= 2007 in music =

This is a list of notable events in music that took place in the year 2007.

== Specific locations ==
- 2007 in American music
- 2007 in British music
- 2007 in Canadian music
- 2007 in Irish music
- 2007 in Japanese music
- 2007 in Norwegian music
- 2007 in Scandinavian music
- 2007 in South Korean music

== Specific genres ==
- 2007 in classical music
- 2007 in country music
- 2007 in heavy metal music
- 2007 in hip-hop
- 2007 in jazz
- 2007 in Latin music
- 2007 in progressive rock
- 2007 in rock music

== Albums released ==
- List of 2007 albums

== Events ==
=== January ===
- January 1 – George Shearing is knighted for services to music in The Queen's New Year Honours List. Evelyn Glennie becomes a Dame. Imogen Cooper, John Rutter and Rod Stewart are appointed CBE.
- January 12 – In an experiment initiated by The Washington Post columnist Gene Weingarten, violinist Joshua Bell plays incognito busker at the Metro subway station L'Enfant Plaza in Washington, D.C.; of the 1,097 people who passed by, only seven stop to listen and only one recognizes Bell.
- January 19–February 4 – The Big Day Out festival takes place in Australia and New Zealand, headlined by Tool and Muse.
- January 20 - Justin Bieber posted his first YouTube video performing Ne-Yo "So Sick" under the name Kidrauhl.
- January 30
  - Following rumours that The Police will reunite for a tour after 23 years to mark the 30th anniversary of the release of "Roxanne", the band announce that they will perform at the opening of the 49th annual Grammy Awards on February 11 and subsequently announce The Police Reunion Tour.
  - Timbaland plagiarism controversy: rumours circulate that Timbaland may have appropriated his ringtone Block Party and the related beat to Nelly Furtado's "Do It".
  - Lebanese-born UK popstar Mika's music career begins after signing to Universal Records UK.

=== February ===
- February 7 – Avril Lavigne release the lead single from her third album The Best Damn Thing Girlfriend.
- February 11 – the 49th Grammy Awards are presented at the Staples Center in Los Angeles. Christina Aguilera performs "It's a Man's Man's Man's World", a tribute to the Godfather of Soul James Brown. Dixie Chicks, along with producer Rick Rubin, became the biggest winners of the night with five awards, including the big three: Record of the Year, Album of the Year and Song of the Year, while Carrie Underwood wins Best New Artist. Red Hot Chili Peppers won four awards for their 2006 rock hit "Dani California" and the album Stadium Arcadium. Shakira performed for the first time ever at the Grammys with the biggest hit of 2006, "Hips Don't Lie" featuring Wyclef Jean. The Police reunited and performed for the first time in the 21st century.
- February 16 – Chris Cornell leaves Audioslave because of "musical differences".
- February 20 – Christina Aguilera began her second leg of her Back to Basics Tour in the US. The tour would go on to become the highest-grossing tour for a female artist in 2007.
- February 26 – Gramophone magazine reports on its website a confession by William Barrington-Coupe that he released recordings by other pianists under the name of his wife Joyce Hatto. Barrington-Coupe claims that Hatto was unaware of the deception.
- February 27 – American rock parody band Tenacious D release their movie, Tenacious D in The Pick of Destiny on DVD.
- February 28 – It is announced that the American early 1980s punk band Circle Jerks have released a new song, titled "I'm Gonna Live", also to be heard on their Myspace page. Rumors spread that the band is gearing up to release a follow-up to 1995's Oddities, Abnormalities and Curiosities.

=== March ===
- March 1 – Angela Hacker is voted by viewers the 2007 champion of the televised singing competition Nashville Star. Her prize is a record deal with Warner Bros. Records.
- March 2 – Soilwork hires Daniel Antonsson. He was a session musician for the band in 2006.
- March 12
  - Matchbook Romance announce they are going on indefinite hiatus after ten years, as all members decided to go their separate ways.
  - Grandmaster Flash and the Furious Five, R.E.M., The Ronettes, Patti Smith and Van Halen inducted in Rock and Roll Hall of Fame.
- March 13 – Elliot Yamin releases his song wait for you becoming Number 13 on the Top 100 Billboard and being viewed over 60 Million times.
- March 16 – Bad Religion reveal their new album will be called New Maps of Hell.
- March 21 – Toshimitsu Deyama announces that he has been recording with Yoshiki after a gap of ten years.
- March 25 – Elton John plays Madison Square Garden for the 60th time, to celebrate his 60th birthday. The concert sets the record for most performances by an artist at the venue. Longtime songwriting partner Bernie Taupin makes an appearance, as do celebrities Whoopi Goldberg and Robin Williams and former President Bill Clinton. John performs songs from his back catalogue, including "Ballad of a Well-Known Gun" and "Roy Rogers".

=== April ===
- April 2 – Genesis release the first of 5 planned box sets, Genesis 1976–1982. The boxsets and their associated remasters attract criticism from Genesis fans, progressive rock enthusiasts, and audiophiles for their heavy dynamic range compression, being touted as a microcosm of the loudness war.
- April 7 – Joss Stone's third studio album Introducing Joss Stone debuts at number two on the US Billboard 200, becoming the highest debut entry by a British female solo artist on the US chart; the record was previously held by Amy Winehouse's Back to Black, which had debuted at number seven the previous week.
- April 8 – Japanese street musician Koichi Toyama is one of the candidates in the election for governor of Tokyo. He finishes 8th out of a field of 14.
- April 10 – Beyoncé launches The Beyoncé Experience in Tokyo, Japan.
- April 17 – Avril Lavigne releases the best-selling album of the year worldwide The Best Damn Thing.
- April 22 – Patrick Wolf announces his retirement from the music business. However, he later revokes this, saying that he will merely be on hiatus.
- April 27 – 29 – Coachella Valley Music and Arts Festival in Indio, California.
- April 29 – The first precollege music conservatory for the Arab-speaking population of Israel opens in Shfaram.

=== May ===
- May 1 – Ne-Yo returns to music with the release of his second studio album Because of You.
- May 11 – Guitarist Chickn creates a post via MySpace confirming that D.I. will finally release the long-awaited first reunion album On the Western Front on August 7. This would be their first official album featuring new material since 1994's State of Shock.
- May 12 – The 52nd Eurovision Song Contest, held at Hartwall Arena in Helsinki, Finland, is won by Serbian singer Marija Šerifović with the song "Molitva".
- May 15 – Minutes to Midnight by Linkin Park sells more than 600,000 copies in the US and more than 1,000,000 worldwide and is the third best-selling album in the first week.
- May 16 – 20 – The European Festival of Youth Choirs is held in Basel, Switzerland.
- May 19 – The Los Angeles radio station KROQ airs the fifteenth annual Weenie Roast. Bands featured include Linkin Park, Thirty Seconds to Mars, Incubus, Rise Against, Korn, Bad Religion, Social Distortion, Interpol, Queens of the Stone Age, The Bravery, Silversun Pickups, Tim Armstrong, Peter Bjorn and John, Tiger Army, and the Plain White T's.
- May 23 – Jordin Sparks of Arizona wins Season 6 of American Idol. Blake Lewis is named runner-up.
- May 25 – 28 – Salzburg Festival, Evanescence releases a music video of Sweet Sacrifice from album The Open Door.
- May 26 – 27 – Sasquatch! Music Festival
- May 30 – June 5 – The Peel Bay Festival (Isle of Man)

=== June ===
- June 4
  - Mikael Åkerfeldt returns to Bloodbath and the band also hires Per Eriksson.
  - Yoshiki announces that X Japan will reunite for a new tour and a single.
- June 8 – 10 – The annual Download Festival takes place at Donington Park in Leicestershire, England. My Chemical Romance, Linkin Park and Iron Maiden headlined the main stage, the Dimebag Darrel stage by Korn, Mötley Crüe and Billy Talent, and the Tuborg stage by Suicidal Tendencies, Head Automatica and Reel Big Fish.
- June 11 – French electronic duo Justice releases their debut studio album Cross
- June 14 – Daft Punk came back in Paris for a show, ten years after their last performance in the French capital.
- June 22 – Glastonbury Festival (to June 25), with Arctic Monkeys, The Killers, The Who, Shirley Bassey
- June 28 – Spice Girls announce their reunion at The O2 in London in a press conference televised worldwide.
- June 29 – July 1 – Heineken Open'er Festival takes place in Babie Doły military airport, Gdynia, Poland.

=== July ===
- July 1 – The Concert for Diana takes place at Wembley Stadium in London. Performers include Duran Duran, Elton John, Fergie, Joss Stone, Kanye West, Nelly Furtado, Rod Stewart, and Tom Jones.
- July 7 – Live Earth, worldwide series of concerts to initiate action against global warming. Acts include: Sarah Brightman, Linkin Park, Kelly Clarkson, Alicia Keys, Kanye West, Bon Jovi, Fall Out Boy, Shakira, John Mayer, Rihanna, Beastie Boys, Duran Duran, Madonna, Foo Fighters, Red Hot Chili Peppers, The Black Eyed Peas, Spinal Tap, Jack Johnson, Lenny Kravitz, Metallica as well as the reunited bands The Police, Genesis, The Smashing Pumpkins and Crowded House.
- July 7 – 8 – T in the Park, Oxegen 2007
- July 17 – Joe Payne joins Divine Heresy.
- July 27 – Adam Willard leaves The Offspring and is replaced by former Face to Face and Saves the Day drummer Pete Parada.
- July 31 – Korn's eighth studio album, which is Untitled, debuts at number 2 on the Billboard 200, with 123,000 copies sold in its first week. This is the first album without original drummer David Silveria.

=== August ===
- August 4 – 5 – The annual Splendour in the Grass music festival is held in Byron Bay, Australia, headlined by Powderfinger and Arctic Monkeys.
- August 4 – 11 – The Three Choirs Festival is held at Gloucester, with a programme including Benjamin Britten's War Requiem and Mahler's Symphony No 8.
- August 5 – 2007 Karaj Rock Concert incident: 230 Iranian musicians and fans are arrested by the government at an illegal rock concert.
- August 11 – 12 – The eighth annual Summer Sonic Festival is held. Bands that play include: Arctic Monkeys, Avenged Sevenfold, Bloc Party, The Horrors, Interpol, The Offspring, Sum 41, Metallica and We Are Scientists.
- August 16 – Andreas Sydow quits Darkane.
- August 24 – Bryn Terfel's Faenol Festival opens with a concert featuring Girls Aloud. Other artists appearing during the weekend include Rebecca Evans, Carlos Alvarez, and Michael Ball.
- August 24 – 26 – Carling Weekend – Reading and Leeds Festivals
- August 30 – "Gimme More", Britney Spears' comeback single from the Blackout album, makes its official radio debut. Within 24 hours, it is one of the most requested songs on air. The single was certified Platinum by the Recording Industry Association of America, selling 1,000,000 copies shortly after its release.
- August 31 – September 2 – Electric Picnic 2007

=== September ===
- September 3 – My Chemical Romance lead singer, Gerard Way, marries Mindless Self Indulgence bassist, Lyn-Z, backstage at Projekt Revolution in Denver, Colorado
- September 4 – Small Faces and Don Arden plaque unveiled at 52–55 Carnaby Street, London, England
- September 8 – "Weird Al" Yankovic performs his 1,000th live show at Idaho Falls, Idaho.
- September 9 – Britney Spears opens the 2007 MTV Video Music Awards held in the Palms Resort & Casino in Las Vegas, Nevada.
- September 11 - Kanye West releases Graduation, his third studio album.
- September 12 – October 1 – Prague Autumn International Music Festival
- September 20 – 23 – 4th annual Decibel Festival, Seattle
- September 22 – 29 – 35th North Wales International Music Festival is held at St Asaph.
- September 23 – Prashant Tamang wins Season 3 of Indian Idol.
- September 24 – Patrick Watson's album Close to Paradise wins the Canadian Polaris Music Prize for 2007.

=== October ===
- October 1
  - Placebo's drummer Steve Hewitt leaves the band, citing "personal and musical differences" as the cause of the split.
  - The BBC Scottish Symphony Orchestra announces the appointment of Donald Runnicles as its next Chief Conductor.
  - Genesis release the second of 5 planned box sets, Genesis 1983–1998.
  - Jonny Greenwood, guitarist of Radiohead, announces on the band's website that they will release the new album In Rainbows in ten days; consumers can pay whatever price they want.
- October 4 – Fred Mascherino announces his departure from Taking Back Sunday, to pursue his solo career.
- October 15 – Reggae musician Burning Spear is awarded the Jamaican Order of Distinction in the Officer class.
- October 16 – Linkin Park releases their single Shadow of the Day.
- October 22 – X Japan performs for the first time in ten years and announces a concert in Tokyo in spring, followed by a world tour.
- October 24 – The Backstreet Boys released their sixth studio album Unbreakable. It was the first album the Backstreet Boys released as a quartet.
- October 26 – Britney Spears releases her fifth studio album, Blackout, her first studio album in four years. The album debuted at No. 2 on US Billboard Hot 100 making it her first studio album to not debut at #1.
- October 27
  - Interpol, Yo La Tengo, The Whitest Boy Alive, The Horrors, TeddyBears and other bands appear in the Manifest Festival at Mexico City.
  - Singapore Hit Awards 2007 ceremony is held at the Singapore Indoor Stadium.
  - 10th Annual electronic dance music festival Monster Massive, held at Los Angeles Memorial Sports Arena.
- October 31 – Newsboys release their twelfth studio album Go. It is the band's last album with Phil Joel and is their first album with Paul Colman.

=== November ===
- November 1 – The 2007 MTV Europe Music Awards take place at the Olympiahalle in Munich, Germany
- November 6 – Chris Brown comes back with the release of his second studio album Exclusive
- November 9 – Carnatic vocalist Sikkil Gurucharan and Western Classical pianist Anil Srinivasan première tracks from their collaborative album Colour of Rain.
- November 12 – OneRepublic breaks the Top 40 Radio airplay record in the US with "Apologize".
- November 20 – The first Rock Band video game is released for the Xbox 360 and PlayStation 3.
- November 25 – Natalie Gauci becomes the winner of Australian Idol 2007 at the Sydney Opera House, beating Matt Corby to the title. Gauci's winning single "Here I Am" will debut at Number 2 – the first Australian Idol single not to reach Number 1.
- November 27 – Harmonia reunite for their first concert since 1976 in Berlin.

=== December ===
- December 2 – Spice Girls open their reunion tour in Vancouver, Canada.
- December 8–9 – The Los Angeles radio station KROQ airs the eighteenth annual Acoustic Christmas. Bands that played are: Linkin Park, Bad Religion, Angels & Airwaves, Rise Against, Avenged Sevenfold, Serj Tankian, Paramore, Modest Mouse, Jimmy Eat World, Spoon, Feist, The Shins, Silversun Pickups and Muse.
- December 9 – Evanescence finish touring for The Open Door, and part ways with hired musicians, Will Hunt and Troy McLawhorn.
- December 10
  - Led Zeppelin reunite in London for their first show in 25 years.
  - Celine Dion makes the final performance of her 5-year engagement at Caesars Palace in Las Vegas, Nevada.
- December 15 – Leon Jackson is named winner of the fourth series of The X Factor UK. Rhydian Roberts is named runner-up, while Same Difference and Niki Evans finish in third and fourth place respectively.

== Bands formed ==
- See Musical groups established in 2007

== Returning performers ==
- Kevin Ayers (first studio album since 1992)
- Britney Spears (first studio album since 2003)
- Bruce Springsteen and the E Street Band (first studio album since 2002)
- Buck-O-Nine (first studio album since 1999)
- Buffalo Tom (first album since 1998)
- Duran Duran (first album since 2004)
- The Eagles (first studio album since 1979)
- Rush (first studio album since 2002)
- Wu-Tang Clan (first studio album since 2001)
- Linkin Park (first studio album since 2003)

== Bands disbanded ==
- See Musical groups disestablished in 2007

== Bands re-formed ==
- See Category:Musical groups reestablished in 2007

== Bands on hiatus ==
- Allister (hiatus)
- Damiera (on hiatus in April 2007, reformed with new members in June 2007)
- Dimension Zero
- The Early November (indefinite hiatus)
- Evanescence (indefinite hiatus)
- Gerling (indefinite hiatus)
- Los Hermanos (indefinite hiatus)
- Matchbook Romance (indefinite hiatus)
- Nickel Creek (hiatus)
- Sparta (indefinite hiatus)
- Yourcodenameis:milo (indefinite hiatus)
- Train (hiatus)
- Outkast (indefinite hiatus)

== Best-selling albums globally ==
The best-selling records in 2007 according to IFPI:

Position	Album title	Artist
1	The Best Damn Thing	Avril Lavigne
2	Carnival Ride	Carrie Underwood
3	Back to Black	Amy Winehouse
4	Noël	Josh Groban
5	Long Road Out of Eden	Eagles
6	Minutes to Midnight	Linkin Park
7	As I Am	Alicia Keys
8	Call Me Irresponsible	Michael Bublé
9	Life in Cartoon Motion	Mika
10	Not Too Late	Norah Jones

== Best-selling albums in the US ==
Billboard's Top Sellers 2007.

Position	Album title	Artist
1	Daughtry	Daughtry
2	Konvicted	Akon
3	The Dutchess	Fergie
4	Hannah Montana	Various Artists
5	Some Hearts	Carrie Underwood
6	All the Right Reasons	Nickelback
7	FutureSex/LoveSounds	Justin Timberlake
8	High School Musical 2	Various Artists
9	Now 23	Various Artists
10	Minutes to Midnight	Linkin Park
11	B'Day	Beyoncé
12	Graduation	Kanye West
13	Me and My Gang	Rascal Flatts
14	Love	The Beatles
15	The Sweet Escape	Gwen Stefani
16	Hannah Montana 2	Various Artists
17	Awake	Josh Groban
18	Not Too Late	Norah Jones
19	Taylor Swift	Taylor Swift
20	Kingdom Come	Jay-Z

== Top Hits on record ==
Singles which have ranked within Top 25 within the Billboard Hot 100 Hits

- "1973" – James Blunt
- "4 in the Morning" – Gwen Stefani
- "Apologize" – Timbaland featuring OneRepublic (#2)
- "Ayo Technology" – 50 Cent featuring Justin Timberlake and Timbaland (#5)
- "A Bay Bay" – Hurricane Chris (#7)
- "Bartender" – T-Pain featuring Akon (#5)
- "Beautiful Girls" – Sean Kingston (#1)
- "Beautiful Liar" – Beyoncé and Shakira (#3)
- "Because of You" – Ne-Yo (#2)
- "Bed" – J. Holiday (#5)
- "Beggin'" – Madcon (#79)
- "Big Girls Don't Cry" – Fergie (#1)
- "Big Things Poppin' (Do It)" – T.I. (#9)
- "Break It Off" – Rihanna featuring Sean Paul (#9)
- "Bubbly" – Colbie Caillat (#5)
- "Buy U a Drank (Shawty Snappin')" – T-Pain featuring Yung Joc (#1)
- "Can't Help but Wait" – Trey Songz (#14)
- "Clumsy" – Fergie featuring T-Pain (#5)
- "Crank Dat (Soulja Boy)" – Soulja Boy Tell 'Em (#1)
- "Cupid's Chokehold" – Gym Class Heroes featuring Patrick Stump (#4)
- "Cyclone" – Baby Bash featuring T-Pain (#7)
- "Dance Floor Anthem (I Don't Wanna Be in Love)" – Good Charlotte (#25)
- "Destination Calabria" – Alex Gaudino and Crystal Waters (#8)
- "Don't Matter" – Akon (#1)
- "Don't Stop the Music" – Rihanna (#3)
- "Duffle Bag Boy" – Playaz Circle featuring Lil Wayne (#15)
- "Everything" – Michael Bublé
- "Falling Down" – Duran Duran featuring Justin Timberlake (#25)
- "Famous Last Words" – My Chemical Romance
- "Get It Shawty" – Lloyd (#16)
- "Gimme More" – Britney Spears (#3)
- "Girlfriend" – Avril Lavigne (#1)
- "Give It To Me" – Timbaland featuring Justin Timberlake and Nelly Furtado (#1)
- "Glamorous" – Fergie featuring Ludacris (#1)
- "Go Getta" – Young Jeezy featuring R. Kelly (#18)
- "Good Life" – Kanye West featuring T-Pain (#7)
- "Grace Kelly" – Mika
- "Hate That I Love You" – Rihanna featuring Ne-Yo (#7)
- "Here (In Your Arms)" – Hellogoodbye (#14)
- "Home" – Daughtry (#5)
- "How Far We've Come" – Matchbox Twenty (#11)
- "How Long" – The Eagles
- "Hypnotized" – Plies featuring Akon (#14)
- "I Tried" – Bone Thugs-n-Harmony featuring Akon (#6)
- "Ice Box" – Omarion (#12)
- "If Everyone Cared" – Nickelback (#17)
- "I'll Stand By You" – Carrie Underwood (#6)
- "I'm a Flirt" – R. Kelly featuring T.I. and T-Pain (#12)
- "I'm So Hood" – DJ Khaled featuring Trick Daddy, Rick Ross, Plies and T-Pain (#19)
- "Irreplaceable" – Beyoncé (#1)
- "It's Not Over" – Daughtry (#4)
- "Keep Holding On" – Avril Lavigne (#17)
- "Kiss Kiss" – Chris Brown feat. T-Pain (#1)
- "Last Dollar (Fly Away)" – Tim McGraw (#13)
- "Last Night" – Diddy featuring Keyshia Cole (#10)
- "Let It Go" – Keyshia Cole featuring Missy Elliott and Lil' Kim (#7)
- "Like a Boy" – Ciara (#19)
- "Like You'll Never See Me Again" – Alicia Keys (#12)
- "Lip Gloss" – Lil Mama (#10)
- "Lost Without U" – Robin Thicke (#14)
- "Love Like This" – Natasha Bedingfield featuring Sean Kingston (#11)
- "Love Song" – Sara Bareilles (#4)
- "LoveStoned/I Think She Knows" – Justin Timberlake (#17)
- "Low" – Flo Rida ft. T-Pain
- "Make Me Better" – Fabolous featuring Ne-Yo (#8)
- "Makes Me Wonder" – Maroon 5 (#1)
- "Map of the Problematique" – Muse (#9)
- "Me Love" – Sean Kingston (#14)
- "Never Again" – Kelly Clarkson (#8)
- "No One" – Alicia Keys (#1)
- "On the Hotline" – Pretty Ricky (#12)
- "Our Song" – Taylor Swift (#16)
- "Over You" – Daughtry (#18)
- "Paralyzer" – Finger Eleven (#6)
- "Party Like a Rockstar" – Shop Boyz (#2)
- "Piece of Me" – Britney Spears (#18)
- "Pop, Lock & Drop It" – Huey (#7)
- "Potential Breakup Song" – Aly & AJ (#17)
- "Push It to the Limit" – Corbin Bleu (#14)
- "Rockstar" – Nickelback (#11)
- "Same Girl" – R. Kelly and Usher (#20)
- "Sensual Seduction" – Snoop Dogg (#7)
- "Sexy Lady" – Yung Berg featuring Junior (#18)
- "Shadow of the Day" – Linkin Park (#15)
- "Shawty" – Plies featuring T-Pain (#9)
- "Shawty Is a 10" – The-Dream featuring Fabolous (#17)
- "Shut Up and Drive" – Rihanna (#15)
- "Sorry, Blame It on Me" – Akon (#7)
- "So Small" – Carrie Underwood (#17)
- "Stronger" – Kanye West (#1)
- "Summer Love" – Justin Timberlake (#6)
- "The Sweet Escape" – Gwen Stefani featuring Akon (#2)
- "Sweetest Girl (Dollar Bill)" – Wyclef Jean featuring Niia, Akon and Lil Wayne (#12)
- "Take You There" – Sean Kingston (#7)
- "Tattoo" – Jordin Sparks (#8)
- "Teardrops on My Guitar" – Taylor Swift (#13)
- "This Ain't a Scene, It's an Arms Race" – Fall Out Boy (#2)
- "This Is My Now" – Jordin Sparks (#15)
- "This Is Why I'm Hot" – Mims (#1)
- "Thnks fr th Mmrs" – Fall Out Boy (#11)
- "Throw Some D's" – Rich Boy featuring Polow da Don (#6)
- "Umbrella" – Rihanna feat. Jay-Z (#1)
- "Until the End of Time" – Justin Timberlake and Beyoncé (#17)
- "Wait For You" – Elliott Yamin (#13)
- "Waiting on the World to Change" – John Mayer (#14)
- "Wake Up Call" – Maroon 5 (#19)
- "Walk Away (Remember Me)" – Paula DeAnda (#19)
- "The Way I Are" – Timbaland featuring Keri Hilson and D.O.E. (#3)
- "What Goes Around... Comes Around" –Justin Timberlake (#1)
- "What I've Done" – Linkin Park (#7)
- "What Time Is It?" – High School Musical cast (#6)
- "When You're Gone" – Avril Lavigne (#24)
- "Who Knew" – Pink (#9)
- "With Every Heartbeat" – Robyn featuring Kleerup (#29)
- "With Love" – Hilary Duff (#24)
- "With You" – Chris Brown (#2)
- "You" – Lloyd featuring Lil Wayne (#9)

Billboard Year-End Hot 100 singles of 2007

=== Other international hits ===
- "4 Mots sur un piano" – Patrick Fiori, Jean-Jacques Goldman and Christine Ricol
- "ABC" – Jin
- "Afortunada" – Francisca Valenzuela
- "Amaranth" – Nightwish
- "Baheb Nuoa Kalamak" – Amal Hijazi
- "Bajo el mismo Cielo" – Kany García
- "¡Basta Ya! – Marco Antonio Solís
- "Chak De India" – Sukhwinder Singh, Salim Merchant, Marianne D'Cruz
- "Der Regen fällt" – LaFee
- "Double Je" – Christophe Willem
- "Dziękuję" – Doda
- "Hoy Que Te Vas" – RBD
- "Garçon" – Koxie
- "Invincible" – Muse
- "It Only Reminds Me Of You" – MYMP
- "Jacques a dit" – Christophe Willem
- "La débâcle des sentiments" – Stanislas
- "Like Only a Woman Can" – Brian McFadden
- "Maximum" – Murat Boz
- "No Te Veo" – Casa de Leones
- "Oshiri Kajiri Mushi" – Uruma Delvi
- "Quiero" – Ricardo Arjona
- "Rise Up" – Yves Larock
- "Shaka Beach: Laka Laka La" – Uverworld
- "Tu Amor No Es Garantía" – Anaís
- "Un Corazón" – Chelo
- "Upside Down" – 6 Cycle Mind

== Classical music ==
=== Instrumental works ===
- Kalevi Aho – Oboe Concerto
- Lera Auerbach – Symphony No. 1 "Chimera"
- Brice Pauset – Vier variationen, for flute, percussion, piano and string trio
- Michael Daugherty – Deus ex Machina
- Lorenzo Ferrero – Fantasy Suite, for flute, violoncello and piano
- Sofia Gubaidulina
  - Ravvedimento, for cello and four guitars
  - In Tempus Praesens, concert for violin and orchestra
- Nigel Hess – Piano Concerto
- Wojciech Kilar – Symphony No. 5 Advent Symphony, for choir and orchestra or instrumental ensemble
- Claude Ledoux – Canto a due for B♭ clarinet and cello
- Karlheinz Stockhausen
  - Balance, for flute, English horn, and bass clarinet
  - Glück (Bliss), for oboe, English horn, and bassoon
  - Hoffnung (Hope), for violin, viola, and cello
  - Glanz (Brilliance), for oboe, clarinet, bassoon, trumpet, trombone, tuba, and viola
  - Treue (Fidelity), for E-flat clarinet, basset horn, and bass clarinet
  - Erwachen (Awakening), for soprano saxophone, trumpet, and cello
- Martijn Padding – And Trees Would Sing, for counter tenor/high tenor and trombone quartet

=== Electronic music ===
- Karlheinz Stockhausen – Cosmic Pulses, electronic music

==== Vocal music with electronic music ====
- Karlheinz Stockhausen –
  - Havona, for bass voice and electronic music
  - Orvonton, for baritone and electronic music
  - Jerusem, for tenor and electronic music
  - Urantia, for soprano and electronic music

==== Instrumental music with electronic music ====
- Keith Kirchoff – The Adventures of Norby, for piano and electronics
- Karlheinz Stockhausen –
  - Havona, for bass voice and electronic music
  - Orvonton, for baritone and electronic music
  - Uversa, for basset-horn and electronic music
  - Nebadon, for horn and electronic music
  - Jerusem, for tenor and electronic music
  - Urantia, for soprano and electronic music
  - Edentia, for soprano saxophone and electronic music
  - Paradies (Paradise), for flute and electronic music

=== Opera ===
- Unsuk Chin – Alice in Wonderland
- Ryan Conarro, William Todd Hunt – Arctic Magic Flute
- Vladimir Cosma – Marius et Fanny
- Victor Davies – Transit of Venus
- Anthony Davis – Wakonda's Dream
- Jonathan Dove – The Adventures of Pinocchio
- Lorenzo Ferrero – Le piccole storie: Ai margini delle guerre
- Philip Glass – Appomattox
- Ricky Ian Gordon – The Grapes of Wrath
- Hans Werner Henze – Phaedra
- James MacMillan – The Sacrifice
- Richard Mills – The Love of the Nightingale
- Fabio Vacchi – Teneke

=== Ballet ===
- Lorenzo Ferrero – Franca Florio, regina di Palermo

== Musical film ==
- Aadavari Matalaku Arthale Verule, Telugu-language film starring Venkatesh and Trisha, with music composed by Yuvan Shankar Raja.
- Across the Universe a musical which tells a love story during war times, using adapted versions of music from The Beatles. It was widely released October 12, 2007.
- Anita O'Day: The Life of a Jazz Singer, documentary, directed and produced by Robbie Cavolina and Ian McCrudden
- August Rush
- Duniya, Kannada-language film written and directed by Soori, with songs by V. Manohar and score by Sadhu Kokila
- Les Chansons d'Amour, directed by Christophe Honoré and starring Louis Garrel, Ludivine Sagnier, Clotilde Hesme and Chiara Mastroianni, with music by Alex Beaupain
- Music and Lyrics
- The musical, Sweeney Todd, was adapted as a major motion picture (under the title Sweeney Todd: The Demon Barber of Fleet Street) by Tim Burton featuring Johnny Depp, Helena Bonham Carter, Christopher Lee, Alan Rickman and Sacha Baron Cohen in key roles. It was released December 21, 2007.
- Hairspray – an adaptation of the Tony Award-winning 2002 Broadway musical of the same name, itself adapted from John Waters' 1988 comedy film. It was released July 20, 2007.
- The film Once, a self-proclaimed modern musical which goes on to win the Academy Award for Best Song for the song "Falling Slowly"
- Piano, solo, biopic about the life of jazz pianist and composer Luca Flores
- Secret

== Musical theater ==
- 110 in the Shade (Schmidt and Jones) -- Broadway revival
- Curtains (Music: John Kander Lyrics: Fred Ebb Book: Rupert Holmes) – Broadway production opened at the Al Hirschfeld Theatre on March 22 and ran for 511 performances
- Legally Blonde (Music and Lyrics: Nell Benjamin and Laurence O'Keefe Book: Heather Hach) - Broadway production opened at the Palace Theatre on April 29 and ran for 595 performances
- Matador (Danish musical) (Music: Bent Fabricius-Bjerre Lyrics: Clemens Telling) – opened at the Copenhagen Opera House on June 10
- Ruža na asfaltu (Music: Darko Hajsek Lyrics: Hajsek and Ladislav Prežigalo Book: Igor Weidlich) - opened at the Komedija Theatre, Zagreb, on October 27
- Siddhartha (Book: Hsing Yun) - opened at the Waterfront Cebu, Cebu City, Philippines, on June 6

== Musical television ==
- Miss Marie Lloyd – Queen of The Music Hall starring Jessie Wallace and Richard Armitage
- High School Musical 2 starring Zac Efron, Vanessa Hudgens, and Ashley Tisdale premiered on the Disney Channel, it went on to become one of the most successful television movies ever.

== Births ==
- January 1 – Miguel Gallego Arámbula, first son of the Latin superstar Luis Miguel
- January 10 – Maléna, Armenian singer and winner of Junior Eurovision Song Contest 2021
- January 28 – Alaya High, American singer, rapper and child actress
- February 4 – Melody, Brazilian singer
- February 21 – Leeseo, South Korean singer (IVE)
- March 15 – Maiú Levi Lawlor, represented Ireland at Junior Eurovision Song Contest 2021
- March 18 – Nettspend, American rapper and songwriter
- March 26 – Gavin Magnus, American singer, rapper, actor, model and social media star
- April 10 - YNW BSlime, American rapper and singer, Brother of YNW Melly
- May 22 - Slayr, American rapper, singer, and record producer
- June 6 - Aubrey Anderson-Emmons, American actress, singer and musician
- July 10 – Viki Gabor, Polish singer and winner of Junior Eurovision Song Contest 2019
- July 12 – Ty Myers, American country music singer-songwriter and guitarist
- July 17 – Nell Smith, Canadian singer-songwriter and collaborator with The Flaming Lips (d. 2024)
- July 18 – JD McCrary, American singer-songwriter, actor and dancer
- July 29 – Lil Tay, American-Canadian singer
- July 31 - Angelica Hale, American singer-songwriter, musician and actress
- September 15 – Nathan Glenn and Alex Jacob Robertson, twin sons of Orli Shaham and David Robertson
- October 7 – Sabrina Sakaë, first daughter of Thalía and Tommy Mottola
- October 30 – Christian Li, Australian violinist
- November 21 – Kevin AMF, Mexican singer
- December 6 – Yoonchae Jeong, South Korean singer, dancer and member of Katseye
- December 29 – Arwin, Swedish actor and singer

== Deaths ==
=== January–February ===
- January 1
  - Julius Hegyi, American conductor, 83
  - Tad Jones, American music historian, 54 (injuries from a fall)
  - Del Reeves, American country singer, 74
- January 3 – János Fürst, Hungarian conductor and violinist, 71
- January 6 – Pete Kleinow, American guitarist (The Flying Burrito Brothers), 72
- January 8 – Mercedes Murciano, Cuban singer (Miami Sound Machine), 49
- January 12 – Alice Coltrane, American jazz multi-instrumentalist, 69
- January 13 – Michael Brecker, American jazz saxophonist, 57 (leukemia)
- January 16 – Thornton "Pookie" Hudson, American singer (The Spaniels), 73
- January 17 – Uwe Nettlebeck, German producer and multi-instrumentalist (Faust), 67
- January 18 – Brent Liles, American punk bassist (Social Distortion), 43 (road accident)
- January 19 – Denny Doherty, Canadian singer (The Mamas & the Papas), 66
- January 21
  - Mina Foley, New Zealand coloratura soprano, 76
  - U;Nee, South Korean singer, rapper, dancer, and actress, 25 (suicide)
- January 22 – Disco D, American music producer and composer, 26 (suicide by hanging)
- January 28 – Karel Svoboda, composer, 68
- January 31 – Kirka Babitzin, Finnish singer, 56
- February 1
  - Whitney Balliett, American journalist and jazz critic, 80
  - Gian Carlo Menotti, composer, 95
- February 4 – Ilya Kormiltsev, Russian songwriter, 47 (spinal cancer)
- February 6
  - Billy Henderson, American vocalist (The Spinners), 67
  - Frankie Laine, American singer, 93
- February 8 – Joe Hunter, American pianist (The Funk Brothers), 79
- February 12 – Eldee Young, American bassist (Young-Holt Unlimited), 71
- February 15 – Ray Evans, American songwriter, 92
- February 18 – John "Bam Bam" Lane, American drummer (Bill Haley & His Comets), 76
- February 19 – Janet Blair, American actress and singer, 85
- February 22 – Edgar Evans, Welsh operatic tenor, 94
- February 23
  - Donnie Brooks, American pop singer, 71
  - Ian Wallace, British drummer (King Crimson), 60
- February 24 – Bryan Balkwill, English pianist and orchestral conductor, 84
- February 28 – Billy Thorpe, British-born Australian rock performer, 60

=== March–April ===
- March 7 – Frigyes Hidas, Hungarian composer, 88
- March 9 – Brad Delp, American singer (Boston), 55 (suicide)
- March 11 – Betty Hutton, American singer and actress, 86
- March 19 – Luther Ingram, American singer, 69
- March 30 – Marcel Merkès, French operatic tenor, 86
- April 5 – Mark St. John, American guitarist (Kiss, White Tiger), 51
- April 9 – Egon Bondy, Czech songwriter (The Plastic People of the Universe), 77
- April 10
  - Walter Hendl, American conductor, composer, and pianist, 90
  - Dakota Staton, American jazz vocalist, 74
- April 14 – Don Ho, Hawaiian musician, 76
- April 17 – Kitty Carlisle, American singer, 96
- April 20 – Andrew Hill, American jazz pianist, 75
- April 25 – Bobby "Boris" Pickett, American singer, 69
- April 26 – San Fadyl, American drummer (The Ladybug Transistor), 31
- April 27 – Mstislav Rostropovich, Russian cellist and conductor, 80
- April 30
  - Zola Taylor, American vocalist (The Platters), 69
  - Grégory Lemarchal, French singer, 23 (cystic fibrosis)

=== May–June ===
- May 6 – Đorđe Novković, Croatian songwriter, 63
- May 8 – Carson Whitsett, American keyboard player, songwriter, and producer (The Imperial Show Band), 62
- May 20 – Ben Weisman, American pianist, 95
- May 27 – Izumi Sakai, Japanese singer (Zard), 40
- June 1 – Tony Thompson, American singer (Hi-Five), 31 (freon overdose)
- June 2 – John Pyke, American drummer (Ra Ra Riot), 23
- June 4 – Freddie Scott, American singer, 74
- June 8 – Nellie Lutcher, American jazz and pop singer and pianist, 94
- June 13 – Oskar Morawetz, Canadian composer, 90
- June 18 – Hank Medress, American singer (The Tokens), 67
- June 24 – Natasja, Danish reggae singer, 33 (car accident)
- June 29 – George McCorkle, American guitarist (The Marshall Tucker Band), 60

=== July–August ===
- July 2
  - Beverly Sills, American operatic soprano, 78
  - Hy Zaret, American lyricist, 98
- July 3 – Boots Randolph, American saxophonist, 80
- July 4 – Bill Pinkney, American vocalist (The Drifters), 81
- July 5 – George Melly, British Jazz vocalist, 80
- July 8 – Jindřich Feld, Czech composer, 82
- July 11 – Rod Lauren, American singer, 67
- July 12 – Robert Burås, Norwegian rock guitarist and songwriter of Madrugada, 31
- July 15 – Kelly Johnson, British guitarist (Girlschool), 49
- July 23 – Ron Miller, American songwriter and producer, 74
- July 29 – Trevor Hudson, American bassist (Bottom of the Hudson), 27 (car accident)
- July 28 – Theo Altmeyer, German classical tenor, 76
- August 4 – Lee Hazlewood, American singer and songwriter, 78
- August 10 – Anthony Wilson, British record executive (Factory Records), 57
- August 12 – Merv Griffin, American singer, television producer and land developer, 82
- August 16 – Max Roach, American jazz drummer, 83
- August 30 – K. P. H. Notoprojo, Javanese gamelan and rebab player, and composer, 98

=== September–October ===
- September 3 – Carter Albrecht, American keyboardist (Edie Brickell & New Bohemians), 34 (shot)
- September 6 – Luciano Pavarotti, Italian tenor, 71
- September 9 – Hughie Thomasson, American guitarist, 55 (heart attack)
- September 10 – Thomas Hansen, Norwegian musician, 31 (drug-related)
- September 11
  - Willie Tee, American singer/songwriter, 63
  - Joe Zawinul, Austrian keyboardist (Weather Report), 75
- September 12 – Bobby Byrd, American soul singer, 73
- September 15
  - Generoso Jiménez, Cuban trombone player, 90
  - Aldemaro Romero, Venezuelan composer, pianist and conductor, 79
- September 25 – Patrick Bourque, Canadian bassist (Emerson Drive), 29
- October 9 – Jacqueline "Lady Jaye" Breyer, British experimental musician (Psychic TV), 38
- October 16 – Toše Proeski, Macedonian singer, 26 (car accident)
- October 17 – Teresa Brewer, American singer, 76
- October 18 – Lucky Dube, South African reggae musician, 43 (shot)
- October 20 – Paul Raven, British bassist (Killing Joke) 46 (heart attack)
- October 24 – Petr Eben, Czech composer, 78
- October 28 – Porter Wagoner, American country singer, 80
- October 30 – Robert Goulet, American singer, 73

=== November–December ===
- November 2 – Witold Kiełtyka, Polish drummer, 23 (bus accident)
- November 6 – Hank Thompson, American country singer and guitarist, 82
- November 11 – John Petersen, American drummer (The Beau Brummels, Harpers Bizarre), 65
- November 12 – Peter "Cool Man" Steiner, Swiss singer, 90
- November 14 – Craig Smith, American conductor, 60
- November 16 – Grethe Kausland, Norwegian singer, 60 (lung cancer)
- November 19
  - Paul Brodie, Canadian saxophonist, 73
  - Kevin DuBrow, American singer, (Quiet Riot), 52
  - Wiera Gran, Polish singer, 91
- November 20 – Ernest "Doc" Paulin, American jazz musician, 100
- November 23 – Frank Guarrera, American singer, 83
- November 24 – Casey Calvert, American guitarist (Hawthorne Heights) 26 (drug overdose)
- November 27 – Cecil Payne, American saxophonist, 84
- November 28
  - Fred Chichin, French musician, (Les Rita Mitsouko), 53
  - Ashley Titus, South African rapper, 37 (heart condition)
- November 29 – Jim Nesbitt, American country singer, 75
- November 30 – Patrick Mason, American bassist Arsonists Get All the Girls, 21
- December 3 – Sergio Gómez, Mexican singer (K-Paz de la Sierra), 34, (murdered)
- December 4 – Pimp C, American rapper (UGK), 33 (drug-related)
- December 5 – Karlheinz Stockhausen, German avant-garde composer, 79
- December 12 – Ike Turner, American guitarist, 76
- December 16
  - Dan Fogelberg, American singer/guitarist, 56
  - Harald Genzmer, German composer and teacher, 98
- December 21 – Ruth Wallis, American singer, 87
- December 22 – Joe Ames, American singer (Ames Brothers), 88
- December 23
  - Oscar Peterson, Canadian jazz pianist, 82
  - Evan Ferrell, American bassist (Rogue Wave), 33
- December 25 – Pat Kirkwood, English actress and singer, 86
- December 26
  - Joe Dolan, Irish singer, 68
  - Les Humphries, German singer (Les Humphries Singers), 67

== See also ==
- 2007 in country music
- 2007 in British music
- 2007 in hip hop music
- 2007 in heavy metal music
- List of 2007 albums
- Timeline of musical events
