= Mirna Khayat =

Lebanese music video director)

Mirna Khayat (Arabic: ميرنا خياط; born 1973) is a Lebanese music video director.

== Career ==
Khayat has worked with Amal Hijazi, Pascale Machaalani, George Wassouf, Mayssam Nahas and Nancy Ajram.

Khayat's breakthrough came in 2003 when she was chosen to work with Amal Hijazi for Hijazi's music video "Romansyia", which showed Hijazi has a young star who had fallen in love. Mirna went to direct Hijazi's other music videos such as "Bedawwar A Albi" and "Mistanie Eiy" which also gained favourable reviews.

In 2005, Mirna Khayat returned to the music scene with Amal Hijazi's "Baad Sneene"and later "Baheb Noa Kalamak". In 2007, Khayat directed Nancy Ajram's Gulf song, "Meshtagel Leh". She has also directed some hit music videos such as Melissa's "Leil ya Leil ", "Kam Sana", and "Garahtak".

In recent years, Khayat has directed the biggest music video hit "Byehsidouni" for George Wassouf.
