= 2007 in classical music =

== Events ==
- January 1 — George Shearing is knighted for services to music in the Commonwealth New Year Honours List. Evelyn Glennie becomes a Dame. Imogen Cooper and John Rutter are appointed CBE.
- February – A lightning strike severely damages the ageing organ at Llandaff Cathedral, which has to be replaced.
- February 26 – Gramophone magazine reports on its website a confession by William Barrington-Coupe that he released recordings by other pianists under the name of his wife Joyce Hatto, claiming that she was unaware of the deception.
- April 29 – The first precollege music conservatory for the Arab-speaking population of Israel opens in Shfaram.
- May 16–20 – The European Festival of Youth Choirs is held in Basel, Switzerland.
- 4–August 11 – The Three Choirs Festival is held at Gloucester, with a programme including Benjamin Britten's War Requiem and Mahler's Symphony No 8.
- 24 August – The Faenol Festival in North Wales, masterminded by Bryn Terfel, opens with a concert featuring Girls Aloud. Other artists appearing during the weekend include Rebecca Evans, Carlos Alvarez, and Michael Ball.
- September 13 – The Porter completion of the Overture in G minor by Charles Ives is premiered in Madison, Connecticut, performed by the Orchestra New England conducted by James Sinclair.
- September 22–29 – The 35th North Wales International Music Festival is held at St Asaph.
- November 9 – At the Hindu Novemberfest, Carnatic vocalist Sikkil Gurucharan and Western Classical pianist Anil Srinivasan première tracks from their collaborative album Colour of Rain.

== New works ==
The following composers' works were composed, premiered, or published this year, as noted in the citation.

=== A ===
- Kalevi Aho – Oboe Concerto
- Lera Auerbach – Symphony No. 1 "Chimera"

=== D ===
- Michael Daugherty – Deus ex Machina

=== F ===
- Lorenzo Ferrero – Fantasy Suite, for flute, violoncello and piano

=== G ===
- Sofia Gubaidulina
  - Ravvedimento, for cello and four guitars
  - In Tempus Praesens, concert for violin and orchestra

=== H ===
- Nigel Hess – Piano Concerto

=== K ===
- Wojciech Kilar – Symphony No. 5 Advent Symphony, for choir and orchestra or instrumental ensemble

=== L ===
- Claude Ledoux – Canto a due for B♭ clarinet and cello

=== P ===
- Martijn Padding – And Trees Would Sing, for counter tenor/high tenor and trombone quartet
- Brice Pauset – Vier variationen, for flute, percussion, piano and string trio

=== S ===
- Karlheinz Stockhausen – Klang
  - Balance, for flute, English horn, and bass clarinet
  - Glück (Bliss), for oboe, English horn, and bassoon
  - Hoffnung (Hope), for violin, viola, and cello
  - Glanz (Brilliance), for oboe, clarinet, bassoon, trumpet, trombone, tuba, and viola
  - Treue (Fidelity), for E-flat clarinet, basset horn, and bass clarinet
  - Erwachen (Awakening), for soprano saxophone, trumpet, and cello

=== Opera premieres ===
- Alice in Wonderland (Unsuk Chin, David Henry Hwang; June 30)
- Appomattox (Philip Glass, Christopher Hampton; October 5)
- Frau Margot (Thomas Pasatieri, Frank Corsaro; June 2)
- Monkey: Journey to the West (Chen Shi-Zheng, Damon Albarn; 28 June)

=== Ballet ===
- Lorenzo Ferrero – Franca Florio, regina di Palermo

== Albums ==
- Haydn Piano Sonatas – Fazıl Say
- P. D. Q. Bach and Peter Schickele: The Jekyll and Hyde Tour – Peter Schickele

== Musical films ==
- War/Dance
- Water Flowing Together

== Deaths ==
- January 1 – Julius Hegyi, American conductor, 83
- January 3 – János Fürst, Hungarian conductor and violinist, 71
- January 21 – Mina Foley, New Zealand coloratura soprano, 76
- January 28 – Karel Svoboda, Czech songwriter and composer, 68 (suicide)
- December 5 – Karlheinz Stockhausen, German avant-garde composer, 79
- December 16 – Harald Genzmer, German composer and academic, 98

== Major awards ==
=== Classical Brits ===
- Singer of the Year — Anna Netrebko
- Musician of the Year — Leif Ove Andsnes
- Young British Classical Performer — Ruth Palmer
- Album of the Year — Paul McCartney – Ecce Cor Meum
- Soundtrack of the Year — Planet Earth – George Fenton
- Critics' Award — Freiberg Baroque Orchestra/RIAS Kammerchoir/Rene Jacobs - Mozart/La Cler
- Lifetime Achievement In Music — Vernon Handley

=== Grammy Awards ===
- See 50th Grammy Awards

== See also ==
- 2007 in music
