= Habibi Oud =

2001 single by Amal Hijazi

Single by Amal Hijazi

from the album Akher Gharam
- Released: 2001
- Recorded: 2000
- Genre: Arabic pop
- Length: 4:02
- Label: Dilara Master Production
- Producers: Dilara Master Production, Music Master

Amal Hijazi singles chronology
"Akher Gharam" (2001)	"Habibi Oud" (2001)	"Ghanniet" (2002)

"Habibi Oud" (Return my Darling) is an Amal Hijazi single from her debut album Akher Gharam.

The ballad is about loyalty in a relationship and it was a big success in Lebanon where it debuted at number one. It is Hijazi's third consecutive number one single in that country, after "Akher Gharam" and "Rayyah Balak". In addition, "Habibi Oud" was a number hit in countries like Syria, Jordan and Egypt, becoming one of Hijazi's greatest hits.

As one of Hijazi's most popular songs, the song was prominent in all of her concerts.

Two different scenes of the music video of "Habibi Oud" exist. At first, Hijazi is singing on a platform, as if in a private performance as she sings about her lover. Other scenes show her singing solo in front of a band of dancers behind various colourful backgrounds.

Even years after its release, "Habibi Oud" is still considered to be one of Hijazi's most artistic songs, according to most critics.
