= Einak =

Single by Amal Hijazi

from the album Zaman
- Released: 2002
- Recorded: 2002
- Genre: Arabic Pop
- Length: 3:39
- Label: Dilara Master Production
- Producer(s): Music Master, Dilara Master Production

Amal Hijazi singles chronology
"Ghanniet" (2001)	"Einak" (2002)	"Zaman" (2002)

"Einak" (Your Eyes, Arabic: عينك عينك) is a song recorded by the international raï star Faudel and Lebanese singer Amal Hijazi. The song was released in 2002, being a major hit of the year and a prominent release from Hijazi's second album Zaman. It was the video of the song that made it a hit and started an unusual public fascination with Hijazi. In the video, she is seen dancing and lying next to Faudel and she sings about her love. In addition, Hijazi had returned with a completely new look of blonde, short hair that also helped her to attract attention.

Even years after its release, "Einak" remains milestone in Hijazi's career and the singer has frequently sung it in a number of concerts.
