= Waylak Min Allah =

Waylak Min Allah ويلك من الله
- Amal Hijazi

Studio album by Amal Hijazi
- Released: 2010
- Genre: Arabic Pop
- Label: Rotana Records
- Producer: Rotana

Amal Hijazi chronology
Keef el Amar (2008)	Waylak Min Allah ويلك من الله (2010)

Singles from Waylak min Allah
- 1. "Waylak min Allah"; 2. "Be'younak Za'al"

Waylak min Allah (Arabic: ويلك من الله, English: Be careful from God) is the sixth studio album by Lebanese artist Amal Hijazi. It was her first album after a hiatus, during which she focused on raising her first child, Karim. The album was released in late 2010 by Rotana Records.

Hijazi spoke out against "people's attack on the cover photo," due to her wearing a hijab; she insisted that "The album is very strong and very beautiful."lit.

Hijazi collaborated with a number of lyricists and musicians, including poet Karim Al Iraqi. The title track and the first single, "Waylak min Allah," was written by Marcel Medawar (lyrics) and Omit Sayan (music), and it deals with the story of a husband who deceives his wife's love.

To promote the album, Hijazi performed at the New Year's Eve at Casino du Liban.

== "Waylak min Allah" music video ==
The music video for the title track was directed by Fadi Haddad. It was shot on 16mm film and on location in Amsheet, Beqaa Valley, Chtaura, and Jounieh. The narrative follows a woman (played by Hijazi) who discovers that her lover is a foreign agent working against Lebanon.

== Track listing ==
1. Bakhaf (I'm afraid)
2. Ktir A'aleik (It's much for you)
3. Kifak (How are you?)
4. Biya'amelni (He treats me)
5. A'ayno Aalay (His eyes are on me)
6. Chou Baddak (What do you want?)
7. Albi Me'azzab (My heart is hurt)
8. Ma Tsammine (Don't call me)
9. Bent Sghayara (A little girl)
10. Bi 3younak Za'al (In your eyes is sadness)
11. Helefna Bi Hobbena (We swore on our love)
12. Waylak Min Allah (Be careful from God)
