= Iwan (singer) =

Lebanese singer (born 1980)

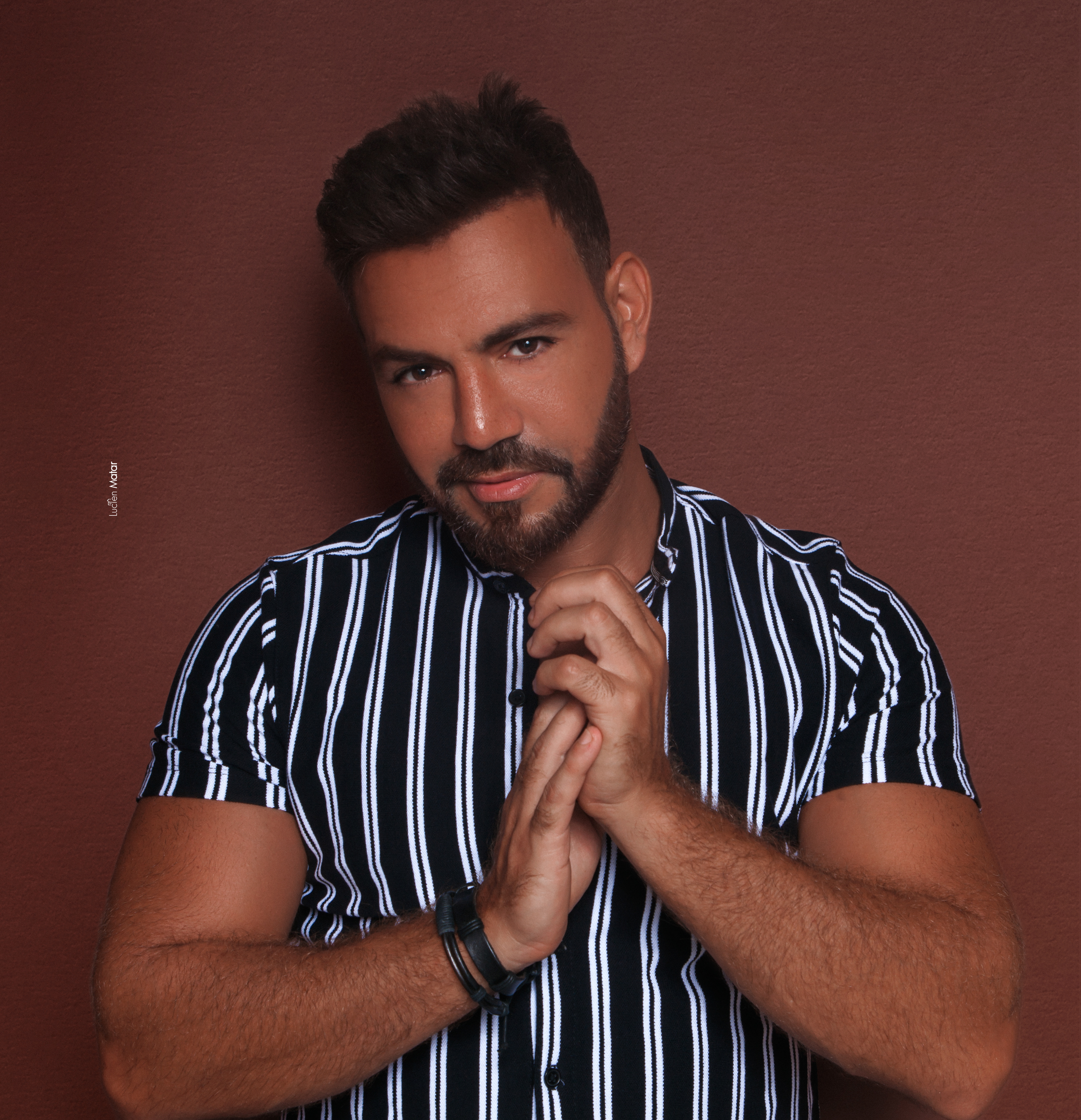
- Iwan in 2020

Background information
- Born: Mohammed Marwan Baassiri; 16 August 1980 (age 46); Beirut, Lebanon
- Genre: Arabic pop
- Occupations: Singer; songwriter
- Instrument: Vocals
- Years active: 2003–present
- Labels: Melody Music (2003–2012); Mazzika (2015–present)

Mohammed Marwan Baassiri (Arabic: محمد مروان بعاصيري; born 16 August 1980), known as Iwan (إيوان), is a Lebanese singer. He started his musical career as a songwriter by composing music for other artists. In 2003, Iwan started his own solo singer, enjoying widespread success in the Middle East and introduced Iwan to the Arabic public as a talented singer. He has released three albums: the debut Alby Sahran (2004) and Erga' Leya (2007) and Ya 100 Nawart (2017).

== Early life ==
Iwan was born on August 16, 1980, in Beirut, Lebanon, to a Muslim family. He is the eldest son of his Syrian-Lebanese mother, Dahouk, and his Palestinian father Marwan. He has two brothers, Mazen and Haitham and one sister, Rasha. Iwan holds a degree in Hotel Management from the Lebanese University. It was said that he is also preparing for his Master of Business Administration (MBA) degree.

== Musical career ==
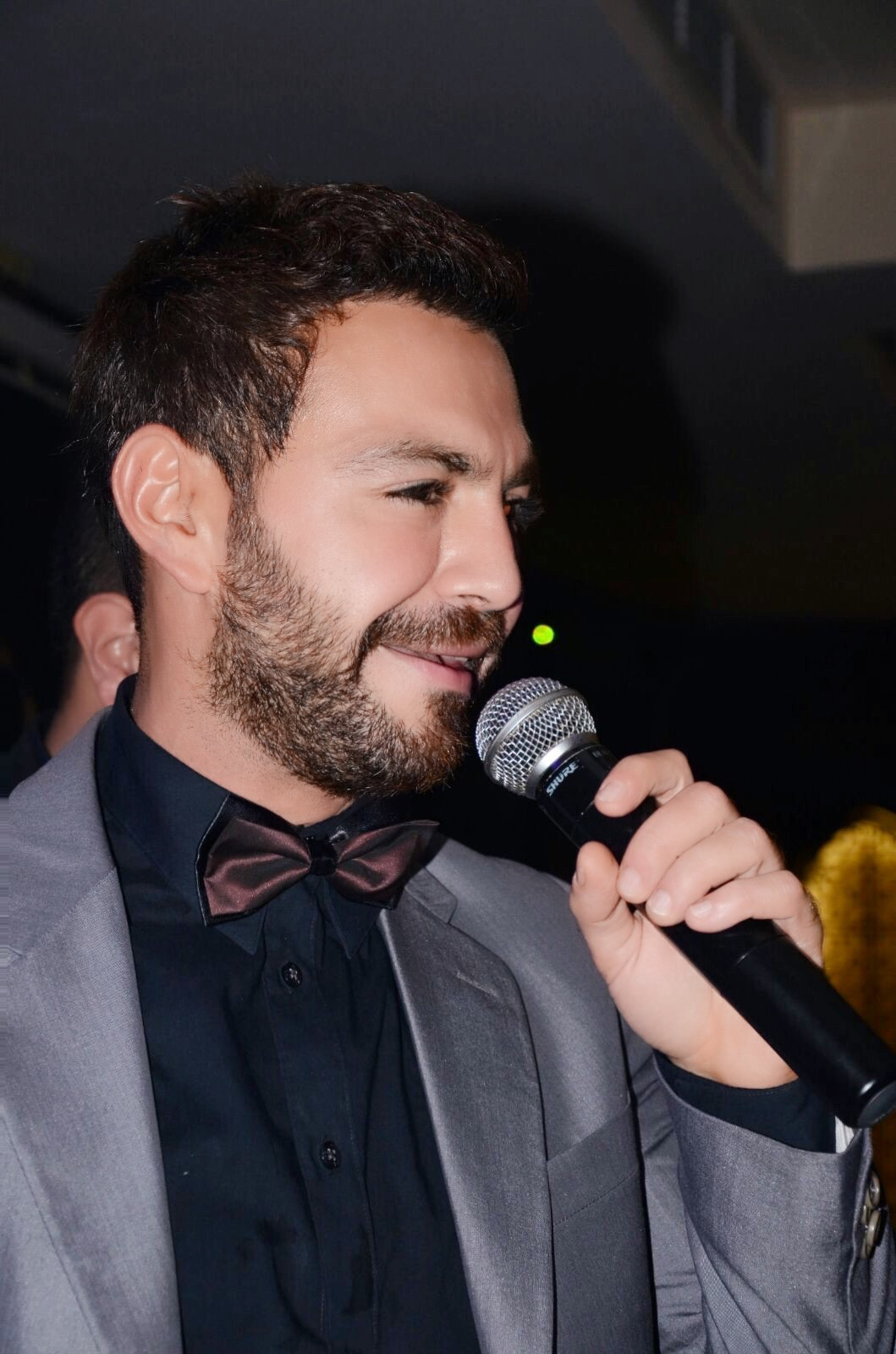
Iwan in 2016

Iwan started singing at school and university. After performing his military service, he started composing songs for other singers like Bassima, Fares Karam, Carole Samaha, Reeda, Ghadi, Nisreen, Maria, and Noura Rahal. Later in 2003, he wrote the lyrics of his first song, "Oul Inshallah", which is the remake of "Deste Mou Ta Matia" by the Greek singer Despina Vandi, then he shot his first video clip for this song with Lebanese director Walid Nassif, the song became one of the biggest hits in the Middle East in that year and introduced Iwan as a new image in the Arab pop scene.

In 2004, Iwan released his second single, "Zanby Ehi?", the song was written and composed by Iwan himself and increased his success especially in Egypt. later in November 2004, he released his debut Alby Sahran with two singles from it, "Alby Sahran" and "Ahlan Wa Sahlan". Iwan won the platinum record for the sales of this album, and won at the same year the Arabian Music Awards that was held in Dubai for the best new Arab male artist over all.

In 2006, Iwan released two single "Wala fil Ahlam" and "Libnani" which was written and composed by Iwan himself, the songs where directed by Jad Shwery and made a success especially "Libnani" which was released after the 2006 war in Beirut, the song and its clip were about the beauty of Lebanon's nature, culture and musical icons.

In August 2007, Iwan's second album was released, titled Erga' Leya and few weeks later, a video of the album's first single "Khadtaha", directed by Yehia Saadeh, was released exclusively on Melody Music channels, the clip was a big success but the song did not make the same impact compared to his previous songs.

In 2008, he released a single with Amal Hijazi called "Khalina Ne'oul", which became a quick hit in Lebanon and other Arabic countries.

In 2009, Iwan starred his first movie, Haflet Zefaf, which was released in summer of 2009

In March 2010, Melody released a single by Iwan, titled "Akbar Kizab". the song was composed by Iwan and it was a success. In 2011 Iwan Released in Ashofak which was sung in The Khaleeji Dialect for the first time by Iwan and at the end of 2011 he released another single called Adini Ganbak, sung in the Egyptian dialect after a few months in 2012 he left melody records. In 2014 iwan released a new single titled Maghayer Alaya, which he wrote. In February 2015 Iwan Released Saet Safa which was an Islamic song and Iwan's first religious single and it was his first time working with Alam El Phan (Mazzika). In Ramadan 2016 Iwan released Al Akaber which was the theme song for the Tunisian drama Al Akaber. In November 2017 after an absence for almost ten years From releasing studio albums Iwan Released his third studio album called Ya 100 Nawart with Mazzika also known as Alam El Phan the first single was released in February 2017 during valentine's Day which was called Yaez Alaya the song was a success, the album was a success he has released three music videos from Ya 100 Nawart which 1)Aweya which are has gained more than 1 million views and is a hit and it was shot in Athens Greece. 2) Ala ElBal Youmati was released during Christmas 2017 3) Ya 100 Nawart music video was released in March 2018 directed by Jean saad. In 2019 Iwan released three more music videos baftekar elkheir and Atalny Rado And Yaez Alaya From Ya 100 Nawart Album. In October 2020 Iwan revealed his readiness in the coming period to release two songs, the first in the Egyptian dialect, and the other in Iraqi, which will be presented separately and not as part of an entire album.

== Personal life ==
Iwan got married in secret in 2008 and got divorced at the end of 2009 and refused to talk about this subject with the media.

He shares his birthday with American pop icon Madonna and it is said that he is a huge fan. He performed a cover version of "Justify My Love" in concert in Beirut in 2013 which sparked controversy.

== Discography ==
- 2004: Albi Sahran
- 2007: Erga' Leya
- 2017: Ya 100 Nawart

== Filmography ==
- 2009: Haflet Zefaf
