= Keef el Amar =

Studio album by Amal Hijazi
- Released: 31 March 2008
- Recorded: 2007/2008
- Genre: Arabic pop music, Music of Lebanon
- Label: Rotana; Awakening (distributor)

Amal Hijazi chronology
Baya al Ward (2006)	Keef el Amar (2008)	Waylak Min Allah (2011)

Keef el Amar (How's the moon?) is Amal Hijazi's fifth studio album it has been released on March 31, 2008. The first video clip, "Ahla Ma Fel Eyyam", has been released in the same day. A romantic ballad song in the Egyptian dialect, the song was composed by Nour, written by Ahmed Ali Mousa and arranged by Tarek Tawakoul.

In addition the album includes "Nefsy Tefhamny" ("I Wish You Could Understand Me"), which Hijazi released as a single in mid-2007.

Amal stated that this album will be her most diverse yet and fans have been eagerly awaiting it.

The album became a huge success throughout the Middle East and Hijazi went on tour for number of musical concerts in Egypt and in the Gulf countries.

The photograph for the album cover was taken by David Abdullah and was designed by George Yousif.

The album's first single, "Haseebak Terenn" was released in early 2008.

== Track listing ==
#	Title	Composer	Arranger	Lyrics
1	"Alby Nadaak"	Nader Nour	Tareq Toukel	Ahmed Ali Moussa
2	"Keef El Amar"	Haitham Zayyad	Tony Saba	Hassan Menjad
3	"Haseebak Terenn"	Haitham Zayyad	Tony Saba	Mohamed Mouafi
4	"Aainy Aalaik"	Jean Saliba	Nasser El As'ad	Ahmad Madi
5	"Malait Aalayya Donyeti"	Nader Nour	Walid Sheraqi	Rabi' El Seyoufi
6	"Ahla Ma Fel Ayyam"	Nader Nour	Tarek Toukel	Jamal El Khouli
7	"Deq El Mayy"	Haitham Zayyad	Tony Saba	Ahmed Madi
8	"Bansa Rouhy"	Haitham Zayyad	Tony Saba	Ahmad Madi
9	"Nefsy Tefhamny (Gheyabak Taal)"	Haitham Zayyad	Tony Saba	Ramy El Yousif
10	"Mestaagel Laih"	Mahmoud Khayami	Michel Fadel	Nasser El Gil
