= Shatha Hassoun =

Musical artist

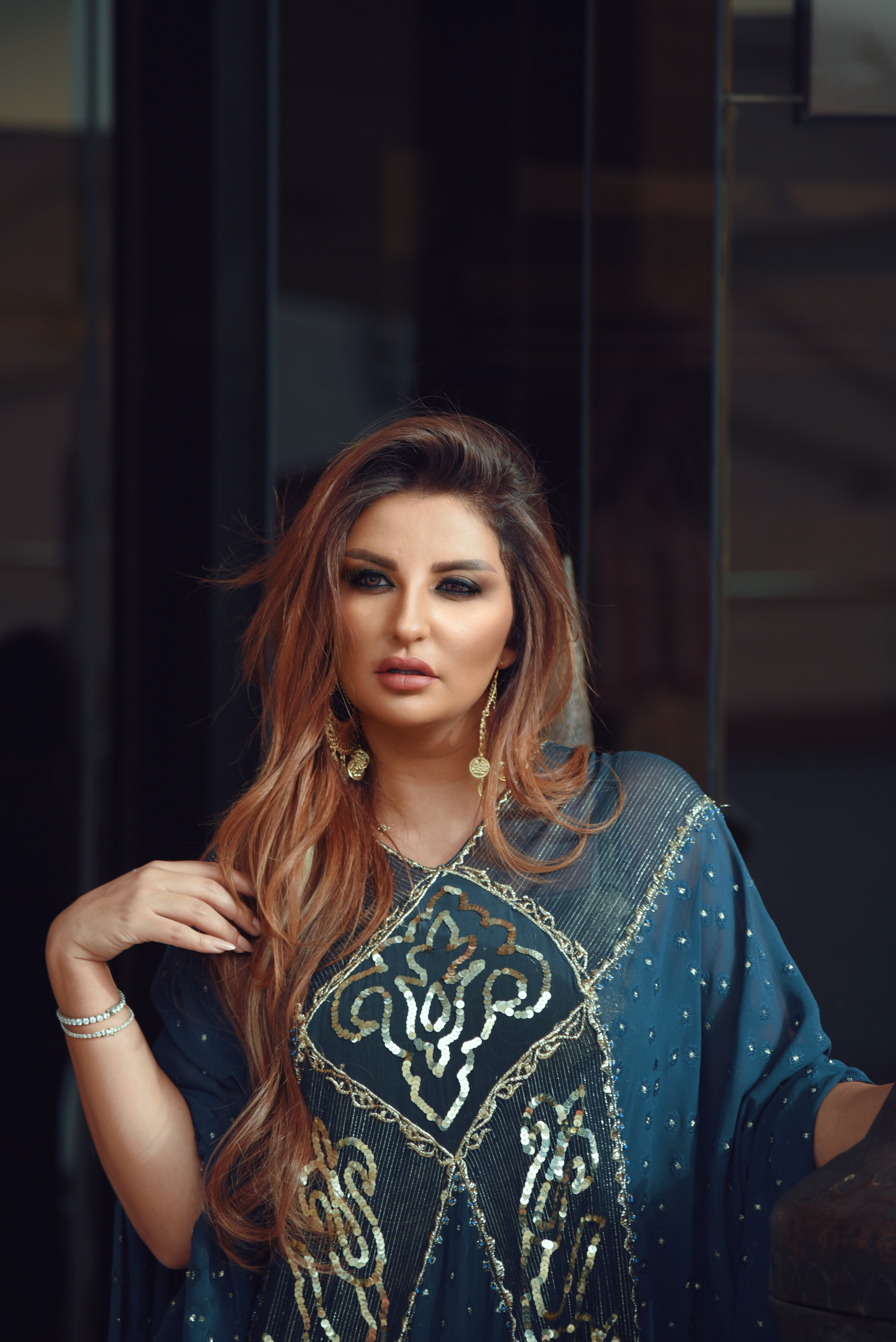
- Hassoun performing in 2021
- Born: Shatha Amjad Al-Hassoun شذى أمجد الحسون; 3 March 1981 (age 45); Casablanca, Morocco
- Occupations: Singer, songwriter, dancer, musician, actress, writer
- Years active: 2007–present
- Musical career
- Genres: Iraqi music, Arabic, World
- Label: Rotana Music Group
- Website: shathahassoun.me

Shatha Amjad Al-Hassoun (Arabic: شذى أمجد الحسون; born 3 March 1981), better known as Shatha Hassoun (Arabic: شذى حسون), is a Moroccan-Iraqi singer, who rose to fame as the winner of the 4th season of the pan-Arab television talent show Star Academy Arab World, and an occasional actor. Hassoun was the first Arab woman to win the competition. She is a popular singer across the Arab world and has been referred to as the "daughter of Mesopotamia".

== Early life ==
Hassoun's father is a well-known Iraqi reporter from Hillah. Her mother is Moroccan and is a history teacher from Safi. Growing up, Hassoun divided her time between Morocco and France. She studied English Literature in Casablanca and continued her university studies in Tangier, where she joined the program of Hotel and Tourism Management. She then continued her studies in France, where she gained her master's degree.

Her family, which includes her parents and one brother, resides in Morocco while she currently lives in Dubai.

== Career ==
Hassoun has sung in many languages including Arabic, English, French, Spanish, Italian and German.

=== Star Academy 4 ===
Hassoun participated in the fourth season of Star Academy Arab World. Although she grew up in Morocco and had never visited Iraq by the time of the show, she nevertheless represented her father's nation in the competition. She "eagerly took the mantle of Iraqiness in emotional renditions of classic songs about Iraq" and became the focus of discourse in the media about national unity and pride among Iraqis.

In 2007, Hassoun won Star Academy 4, making her the first female winner. Her performance of Lebanese singer Fairouz's song "Baghdad" earned her 54.8% of the vote, which enabled her to reach the finals. Along with the four finalists, Hassoun won the competition by receiving 40 percent of the votes. Around one out of every four Iraqis cast a vote for her. According to media scholar Marwan Kraidy:

"Hassoun’s rushing on stage on learning of her victory, in a blue sequin dress under flying confetti, falling on her knees in tears, arms extended, holding a body-sized Iraqi flag, overcome by emotions, became an iconic image that consecrated her as a symbol of Iraq."

She was also critiqued by other elements of Iraqi society who accused her of "indecency" and transgression of "honor" and religious norms for women.

=== Aftermath of Star Academy ===
Soon after winning the competition, Hassoun released her first single entitled "Rooh." It was written and composed by Lebanese songwriter Nikola Saada Nikhla. It was the first song to ever debut at number one on Rotana's PEPSI Top 20 charts; it stayed at number for two weeks then peaking again at number one.

The second major song she released, "Asmallah Asmallah" or "Ebin Bladi", was written and composed by the Iraqi poet, Karim Al Iraqi as a gift to the Iraqi people and to the Iraqi national football team, which won the Asian Cup 2007. It has been suggested that this was "a sort of second national anthem" for Iraq.

"Oushaq" was written and composed by the Lebanese singer Marwan Khoury.

Hassoun also revived several traditional Iraqi songs; "Allela 7elowa" and "Aleik As'al" as a duo with Ilham al-Madfai. She also released an Iraqi song, "Mza'elni", that was written by Amar Almarhon and composed by Mohand Mehsen, and "Lo alf mara," which was the first song composed by Melhem Barakat for a non-Lebanese artist. Hassoun has also worked with the Iraqi poet Karim Al Iraqi to produce new Iraqi songs (Al Iraqi similarly worked with the likes of Kadim Al Sahir). Hassoun has also collaborated with Salah Al-Sharnoby, Ramy Ayach, Assi El Helani, Abadi Aljawher and George Wassouf.

=== Acting ===
Apart from vocal performance, Hassoun has participated in an Iraqi-Syrian-Egyptian television series called Rasael Men Ragol Mayet ("Letters from a Dead Man") alongside Syrian actor Ghassan Masoud and many Iraqi actors. The series addresses various problems in Iraqi society between 1979 and 2005. Directed by Hassan Hosny, it was filmed in Syria and aired exclusive on Al-Baghdadia TV in the month of Ramadan 2008.

=== 2009–present ===
In late July 2009, Hassoun went to her country's capital Baghdad and sang two big charity concerts for the children of Iraq, the first one in Al-elowea club and second one in Hunting Club. She held a press conference in Baghdad where she talked about her joy to be among the Iraqi and Arab singers who visited Baghdad despite the unstable security situation at that time.

Mosab has worked on an album that plans to include songs in multiple Arabic dialects, including Jordan.

Hassoun has toured across North America, Syria, Lebanon, Jordan, Kuwait, Sweden and Egypt.

In 2010, she held a concert in Dubai alongside Fares Karam.

== Awards ==
- 2007 Murex D'or Award – Best Uprising Artist (held in Casino du Liban)
- 2008 DG Festival Award – Best Rising Female Singer
- 2008 Art Festival Award – Best Rising Female Singer
- 2009 Murex D'or Award

== Discography ==
=== Singles ===
Title	Year release
"Smallah Smallah"/"Ebin Bladi"	2007
"ROUH"	2007
"Eshaq"	2008
"Aleik As'al"	2008 (commercial)
"Allela 7elowa"	2008
"Mza'elni"	2009
"Law Alf Marra"	2009
"Ba3 7waya"	2010
"Wa'ed Argoob"	2010
"Shofi baink o baina"	2010
"Alsaa'aa"	2010
"Sha3lha"	2011

=== First Album ( Wajh Thani ) ===
Title	Year release
"Mo Kader"	2011
"Mno el Ma3nda Madi"	2011
"Alaa eldeen"	2011
" Ya 3ma"	2011
"khaloh"	2011
"khalk hn"	2011
"T3al A5tobni"	2011
"Ma Abeek"	2011
" Tsadg wala matsadeg"	2011
"Wajh Thani"	2011
"Sha3lha"	2011
" Al Kalam el Jare7"	2011

== Filmography ==
=== Television ===
- Rasael Men Ragol Mayet (Letters from a Dead Man) – 2008
