= Metropolis Symphony =

Musical work composed by Michael Daugherty

Metropolis Symphony for Orchestra (1988–93) by American composer Michael Daugherty is a five-movement symphony inspired by Superman comics. The entire piece was created over the span of five years with separate commissions for each movement. Individual movements may be performed separately; however, it is preferred that the 41 minute symphony be performed in its entirety. Metropolis Symphony was premiered by the New Hampshire Symphony Orchestra, James Bolle conducting, in November 1993, at the Palace Theater in Manchester, New Hampshire. A connective narrative between movements was written and read by Jack Larson, who had played Jimmy Olsen on television in The Adventures of Superman. The orchestral version without narration was premiered by the Baltimore Symphony Orchestra, David Zinman conducting, in January 1994, at the Meyerhoff Concert Hall in Baltimore, Maryland.

A new recording conducted by Giancarlo Guerrero and performed by the Nashville Symphony Orchestra was nominated in six categories for Grammy Awards of 2011. It won in the Best Orchestral Performance, Best Engineered Album, Classical and Best Classical Contemporary Composition categories.

== Movements ==
The symphony has five movements:

1. Lex (1991)
  - Duration: 9 minutes
  - Commissioned by the Baltimore Symphony Orchestra, David Zinman, Music Director
  - Instrumentation: piccolo, 2 flutes, 2 oboes, English horn, 2 clarinets, bass clarinet, 2 bassoons, contrabassoon; 4 horns, 4 trumpets, 3 trombones, tuba; timpani, strings
2. Krypton (1993)
  - Duration: 7 minutes
  - Commissioned by the New Jersey Symphony Orchestra, Leighton Smith, Conductor
  - Instrumentation: piccolo, 2 flutes, 3 oboes, E flat clarinet, clarinet, bass clarinet, 2 bassoons, contrabassoon; 4 horns, 4 trumpets, 3 trombones, tuba; 4 percussion; piano; strings
3. MXYZPTLK (1988)
  - Duration: 7 minutes
  - Commissioned by Cleveland Chamber Symphony, Edwin London, Music Director
  - Instrumentation: 2 flute solo (II. doubles pic), 2 oboes, 2 clarinets, 2 bassoons; 2 horns, 2 trumpets, trombone; 1 or 2 percussion; synthesizer; strings
4. Oh, Lois! (1989)
  - Duration: 5 minutes
  - Commissioned by Cleveland Chamber Symphony, Edwin London, Music Director
  - Instrumentation: 2 flutes, 2 oboes, 2 clarinets, 2 bassoons; 4 horns, 3 trumpets, 3 trombones; timpani, 2 percussion; synthesizer; strings
5. Red Cape Tango (1993)
  - Duration: 13 minutes
  - Commissioned by the Albany Symphony Orchestra, David Allan Miller, Music Director
  - Instrumentation: piccolo, 2 flutes, 2 oboes, English horn, 2 clarinets, bass clarinet, 2 bassoons, contrabassoon; 4 horns, 4 trumpets, 3 trombones, tuba; timpani, 4 percussion; piano; strings

Publisher: Peermusic Classical

== Discography ==
Metropolis Symphony - Michael Daugherty: Metropolis Symphony/Bizarro Baltimore Symphony Orchestra, David Zinman, Conductor London/Decca Argo 452-103-2

Metropolis Symphony - Michael Daugherty: Metropolis Symphony/Deus ex Machina Nashville Symphony Orchestra, Giancarlo Guerrero, Conductor Naxos American Classics 8.559635
