= Nefsy Tefhamny =

"Nefsy Tefhimny"

Single by Amal Hijazi
- Released: 2007
- Recorded: 2007
- Genre: Arabic Pop, Gulf dialect
- Length: 3:47
- Label: Rotana
- Songwriter: Ramy Youssef
- Producer: Haitham Zyed

"Nefsy Tefhimny" ("I Wish You Could Understand Me") is an Amal Hijazi single released in mid-2007. The song was specially written for Hijazi by Ramy Youssef.

The song was somewhat a mixture of Khaleeji dialects and music with Western beats. It was sung in the Khaleeji accent.

The video of the song was directed by the famed Tony Kahwaji. Hijazi appeared with yet another different look, wearing an extremely short skirt, a white blouse and black coat and gloves, a style similar to an air hostess.
