= Zaman (album) =

Zaman زمان
- Album cover

Studio album by Amal Hijazi
- Released: 2002
- Genre: Arabic Pop
- Length: 48:33
- Producer: Dilara Master Productions

Amal Hijazi chronology
Akher Gharam (2001)	Zaman زمان (2002)	Bedawwar A Albi (2004)

Alternative covers

Singles from Zaman
- 1. "Einak"; 2. "Zaman"; 3. "Romansyia"; 4. "Oulhali"

Zaman (Arabic: زمان, English: Long Time Ago) is the second album by the Lebanese singer Amal Hijazi, considered one of the top-selling Arabic pop records of all time.

The album features music in various styles, from modern pop songs like "Comme ci, Comme ça", "Einak", and "Romansyia", to classical love ballads such as the title track "Zaman" (a cover of the 2001 Turkish song by Bendeniz) and "Oulhali".

As of May 2025, the title track "Zaman" has over 12 million views on YouTube.

== Track listing ==
The album consists of 12 tracks:

No.	Title	Writer(s)	Producer(s)	Length
1.	"Ideely (Arabic: إدعيلي "Pray for me")"	Mohamad Mustafa; Mohamad Rifai	Dilara Master Productions	3:48
2.	"Zaman (Arabic: زمان "Long time ago")"	Ben Diniz; Elias Nasser	Dilara Master Productions	4:11
3.	"Einak Einak (Arabic: عينك عينك "Your Eyes")"	Tarek Abou Jaoude; Tony Abi Karam; Nabil El Kahlidi	Dilara Master Productions	3:59
4.	"Weely Wah (Arabic: ويلى واه)"	Omar; Rafi	Dilara Master Productions	4:19
5.	"Ya Allah (Arabic: يا الله "O God")"	Elias Nasser; Nasser El Assasd	Dilara Master Productions	4:44
6.	"Zein Al-Rouh (Arabic: زين الروح)"	Boudi Naom; Toni Abi Karam	Dilara Master Productions	3:19
7.	"Romansyia (Arabic: رومانسيه "Romance")"	Fawzi Ibrahim; Mohamed Rifai; Mohamed Rahim	Dilara Master Productions	4:07
8.	"Al-Hawa (Arabic: الهوا)"	Azar Habib; Elias Nasser	Dilara Master Productions	3:34
9.	"Oulhali (Arabic: قولهالى "Say it to me")"	Mohamad Rifai; Nasser El Assasd	Dilara Master Productions	3:26
10.	"Albi Dhowa (Arabic: قلبي ضوى)"	Azar Habib; Elias Nasser	Dilara Master Productions	4:39
11.	"Comme ci, Comme ça ("Like This, Like That")"	Elias Nasser; Tarek Abou Jaoude	Dilara Master Productions	4:28
12.	""Mali Meel" (Arabic: مالي ميل)"	Jean Salida; Toni Abi Karam	Dilara Master Productions	3:53

== Singles ==
- "Zaman"
- "Romansyia"
- "Oulhali"
- "Einak Einak"
- Zaman (Featuring Bendeniz)

== See also ==
- Zaman (Song)
- Faudel
