= 2007 Karaj Rock Concert incident =

The 2007 Karaj Rock Concert incident refers to the crackdown of an Iranian rock concert in 2007 by police which led to the imprisonment of 230 Iranian musicians and fans.

Rock groups in Iran are only allowed to perform with a licence from the Ministry of Culture, although this has not prevented numbers of underground formations sprouting up in recent years.
