= Omar and Rafi =

Lebanese-Iraqi boy band

Omar and Rafi (Arabic: عمر ورافي) are a Lebanese-Iraqi boy band. They rose to stardom throughout the Middle East in the year 2000, when they renewed and recorded an old Iraqi song called "Hayra" in a style that was spread all over the Middle East. Omar and Rafi then signed for EMI Production that produced their work between 2001 and 2004. The outcome was two albums, "W Ana F Beirut" and "Gharamy". Most of Omar's and Rafi's songs are their own music, lyrics and arrangement, they have hardly collaborated with any songwriters and music makers.

Al Amir Omar Mohammad-Ali Hamdan (الأمير عمر محمد علي حمدان Born October 28, 1971) is a Lebanese singer, Composer, Television Personality, and Clubbing Expert. Started singing at 13 years old in the State of Kuwait, where he lived for 21 years with his father, mother, and two siblings (Grace and Ali) before going back to Lebanon to study music at The Holy Spirit University of Kaslik.

Omar began his career in the 1990s when he appeared as a contestant on the talent show broadcast "Studio El Fan", on which he received the 5th position in his category "Classic Arabic Songs". During that time he was performing as a professional oriental club singer in Lebanon in 1996.
