= Bedawwar A Albi =

Bedawwar A Albi بتدور ع قلبي

Studio album by Amal Hijazi
- Released: 2004
- Recorded: 2003–2004
- Genre: Arabic pop
- Label: Rotana
- Producer: Stallions Records

Amal Hijazi chronology
Zaman (2002)	Bedawwar A Albi بتدور ع قلبي (2004)	Baya al Ward (2006)

Singles from Bedawwar A Albi
- 1. "Bedawwar A Albi"; 2. "Mistanie Eiy"

Bedawwar A Albi (Arabic: بتدور ع قلبي, English: Searching for My Heart) is the third studio album by the Lebanese singer Amal Hijazi released in 2004. It was her first album under the label Rotana. Produced by Stallions Records with a sponsorship deal with Pepsi and Future Television, the album saw a huge drop in sales compared to her previous album Zaman but it was also because of lack of promotion in countries like Lebanon, Egypt, UAE, and Jordan. Despite everything that happened, Bedawwar A Albi managed to become one of the highest selling albums of 2004 in Lebanon despite the hot competition from the albums of other singers like Elissa and Nancy Ajram. In addition, the album released two number one hit singles "Bedawwar A Albi" and "Mistanie Eiy" .

== Production ==
In early 2004, rumors began to circulate that Hijazi had, in fact, left her previous production company Dilara Master Production and cancelled her sponsorship deals with Music Master and Panasonic. In addition, there were rumors about Hijazi producing her own album under the sponsorship of Pepsi. In an interview later, prior to the release of Bedawwar A Albi Hijazi candidly stated that he had left Dilara Master Production and was now signed to the label Rotana. Hijazi also confirmed that her upcoming album be produced by Stallions Records under a full sponsorship of international names like Pepsi and Future Television.

Hijazi once again teamed up with the Turkish composer and singer Bendeniz for the production of the album's main song Bedawwar A Albi. In addition, Hijazi collaborated with the songwriter Elias Naser and the arranger Jean Marie Riachi. Late in February 2004, Hijazi was almost done recording her third, much-awaited studio album.

== Chart performance ==
Upon its initial release, Bedawwar A Albi received mixed to positive reviews from critics. Songs like "Bedawwar A Albi", "Omri w Sneene", "Alaa Keiffak" and "Keef" became one of Hijazi's greatest ballads and reached high demand from fans in her concerts. In addition, "Mistanie Eiy" was a huge radio hit, while other songs like "Esaal Aliyya" and "Ma Habitsh Gheral" were minor disco hits. Despite the poor marketing and advertisement by Rotana, "Bedawwar A Albi" managed to become a number one best-selling album all around the Middle East.

== Track listing ==
1. "Mestanni Eih" (Arabic: مستني إيه "What Are You Waiting for?")
2. "Aah Ya Habibi" (Arabic: آه يا حبيبى "Oh My Darling")
3. "Bedawwar A Albi" (Arabic: بتدور ع قلبى "Searching for My Heart")
4. "Aah Ya Nari" (Arabic: آ ه يا نارى "Oh, The Fire Within Me")
5. "Ala Keaifak" (Arabic: على كيفك "The Way You Like It")
6. "Isaal Aliee" (Arabic: إسأل على) "Check Up On Me")
7. "Omrei Wa Snieni" (Arabic: عمري وسنيني "My Lifetime and Years")
8. "Ma Habitsh Ghairak" (Arabic: ما حبتش غيرك "I Have Never Loved Anyone But You")
9. "Keaf" (Arabic: كيف "How")
10. "Chou Ally Sar" (Arabic: شو اللى صار "What Happened?")
