= Noura Rahal =

Syrian singer (born 1973)

Noura Rahal نورا رحال
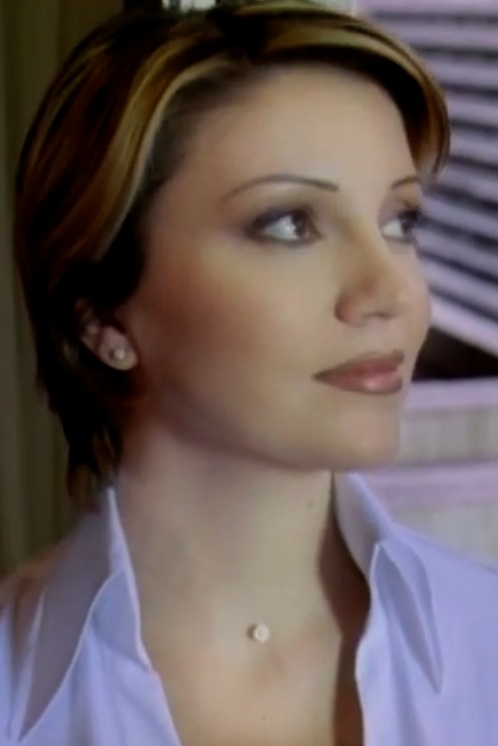
- Noura Rahal, in the "Sid El Alam" music video, 2019

Background information
- Born: 1973 (age 52–53); Damascus, Syria
- Genres: Syrian music, Arabic music
- Years active: 1999–present

Noura Rahal (Arabic: نورا رحال; born 1973) is a Syrian singer from Damascus, who has also had brief acting stints.

Rahal was born in Damascus to a Lebanese-born Syrian Christian father originally from Al Zabadani and a Syrian Christian mother.

== Personal life ==
Rahal married a Greek businessman, with whom she had two sons. She later married again in 2012.

She survived breast cancer due to an early diagnosis in 2007.
