= Rayyah Balak =

2001 single by Amal Hijazi

Single by Amal Hijazi

from the album Akher Gharam
- Released: 2001
- Recorded: 2000
- Genre: Arabic pop
- Length: 4:02
- Label: Dilara Master Production
- Producer(s): Dilara Master Production, Music Master

Amal Hijazi singles chronology
"Halan" (2000)	"Rayyah Balak" (2001)	"Akher Gharam" (2001)

"Rayyah Balak" "(Put your mind at ease)" is a song recorded by the Lebanese star Amal Hijazi in 2000 and released as a single in 2001. The song was a considerable success in its native Lebanon and also managed to reach the number one spot in a number of countries such as Egypt, Syria, Jordan and Morocco.
