= Akher Gharam =

Akher Gharam آخر غرام

Studio album by Amal Hijazi
- Released: 2001
- Recorded: 2000–2001
- Genre: Arabic pop
- Label: Dilara Master Production
- Producers: Dilara Master Production, Music Master, George Youssef

Amal Hijazi chronology
Akher Gharam آخر غرام (2001)	Zaman (2002)

Alternative covers
- Akher Gharam: Ultra Platinum Deluxe Edition

Singles from Akher Gharam
- 1. "Rayyah Balak"; 2. "Akher Gharam"; 3. "Habibi Oud"; 4. "Ghanniet"

Akher Gharam (Arabic: آخر غرام, English: Last Love) is the debut album by the Lebanese singer, Amal Hijazi. It spawned the number one hit singles "Habibi Oud", "Ghanniet" and "Akher Gharam". The album was released in mid-2001, produced by Dilara Master Production and distributed internationally by Music Master. The album's title track was generally considered Hijazi's signature song until it was replaced by her international single "Zaman" in 2002. The album also spent six months on the Top Twenty Charts and became the highest selling debut album ever released by an Arabic artist. The song "Akher Gharam" in addition became a #1 Lebanese hit. In addition, Hijazi's previous single "Rayyah Balak" was included in the album due to popular demand.

== Overview ==
=== Album history ===
After achieving success on the Arabian charts with her single and video clip of "Rayyah Balak" Dilara Productions gave Hijazi the green light to record this full-length album. After the success of the lead single, "Akher Gharam", the album quickly gained a number one position on charts in various countries and becoming one of the highest selling albums of the 2000s Lebanon. Hijazi's amazing and fabulous success made her sign a contract for a duo with the raï superstar Faudel.

=== Singles ===
"Akher Gharam" was the album's lead single. Its release had a major impact on Hijazi's career and significantly increased sales of the album. It peaked at number one in countries like Lebanon, Syria, Morocco, Tunisia and Jordan. In addition, it enjoyed significant success in the Persian Gulf region and was especially popular in the UAE, Bahrain and Qatar.

"Ghanniet", another single also enjoyed similar success thanks to its massive radio airplay and video broadcast on almost all major music channels in the Middle East.

After the songs "Akher Gharam" and "Ghanniet" had their runs globally, Hijazi decided to release the ballad "Habibi Oud" from her album, which also became a prominent single for Hijazi.

== Track listing ==
1. "Rayyah Balak" (Arabic: ريح بالك "Put Your Mind at Ease") – 3:25
2. "Wainak" (Arabic: وينك "Where Are You?") – 4:33
3. "Habibi Oud" (Arabic: حبيبي عود "Return my darling") – 4:02
4. "Keef Ma Badak" – (Arabic: كيف ما بدك "As You Like") – 3:37
5. "Ala el Mose'a" (Arabic: علّى الموسيقى "Turn Up the Music") – 4:48
6. "Ashqr" (Arabic: أشقر "Blond") – 4:02
7. "Zalem" (Arabic: ظالم "Unfair") – 4:32
8. "Maghroom" (Arabic: مغروم "In Love") – 3.45
9. "Nefsak" (Arabic: نفسك "You Wish") – 5:47
10. "Ghanniet" (Arabic: غنيت "I Sang") – 4:46
11. "Akher Gharam" (Arabic: آخر غرام "Last Love") – 5:06
