= Koxie =

Koxhie كوخيێ
- Village
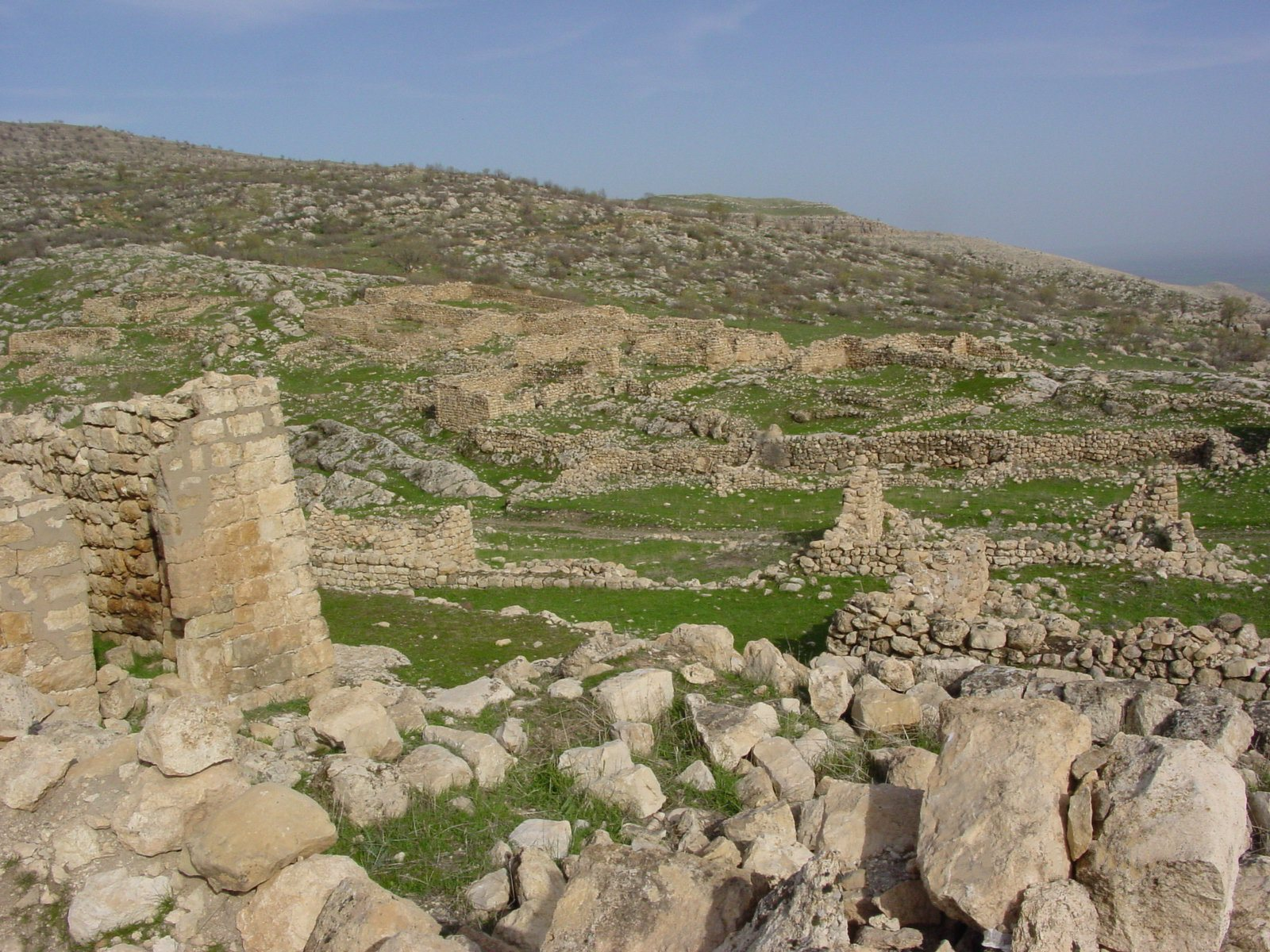
- Koxhie village in the mountainous region of Shikhan
- Interactive map of Koxhie
- Location of Koxhie in the Kurdistan Region Koxhie (Iraqi Kurdistan)
- Coordinates: 36.513°N 43.093°E
- Country: Iraq
- Region: Kurdistan Region
- Governorate: Nineveh
- District: Shekhan District

Population (2024)
  - Total: Displaced
- Demonym: Koxhiean
- Time zone: UTC+3 (AST)
- ISO 3166 code: IQ-NI

Koxhie (Kurdish: كوخيێ, romanized: Koxhî) is a mountainous village in Nineveh Governorate, Kurdistan Region, Iraq, within the Shikhan District (Ain Sifni).

== Houses ==
Most houses are built from plaster and stone, and clay is also used for thermal insulation. Roofs are covered with wooden planks and then coated with clay.

== Population ==
Most of the village's residents were displaced and migrated to the center of Shekhan District and nearby villages. The area is inhabited by Muslim Kurds and Yazidi Kurds. The village is characterized by rugged mountainous terrain, and due to these harsh conditions, residents use donkeys and other pack animals for transportation, as well as agricultural tractors.

== Climate ==
Summer temperatures in the Shikhan area do not exceed 46 °C, while winters are relatively cold due to the mountain ranges stretching across northern Iraq. The temperature rarely drops below 5 °C.

== Gallery ==
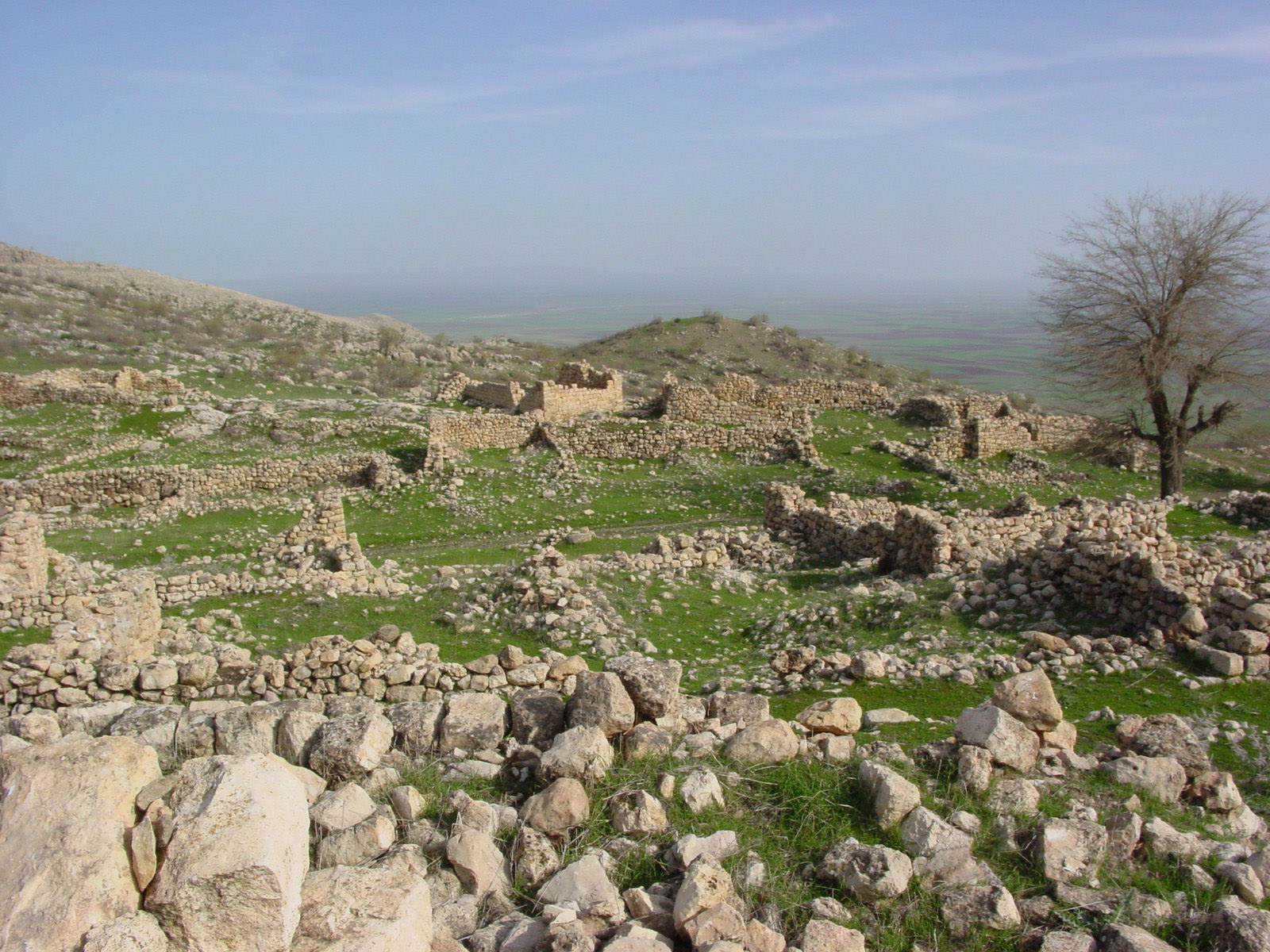

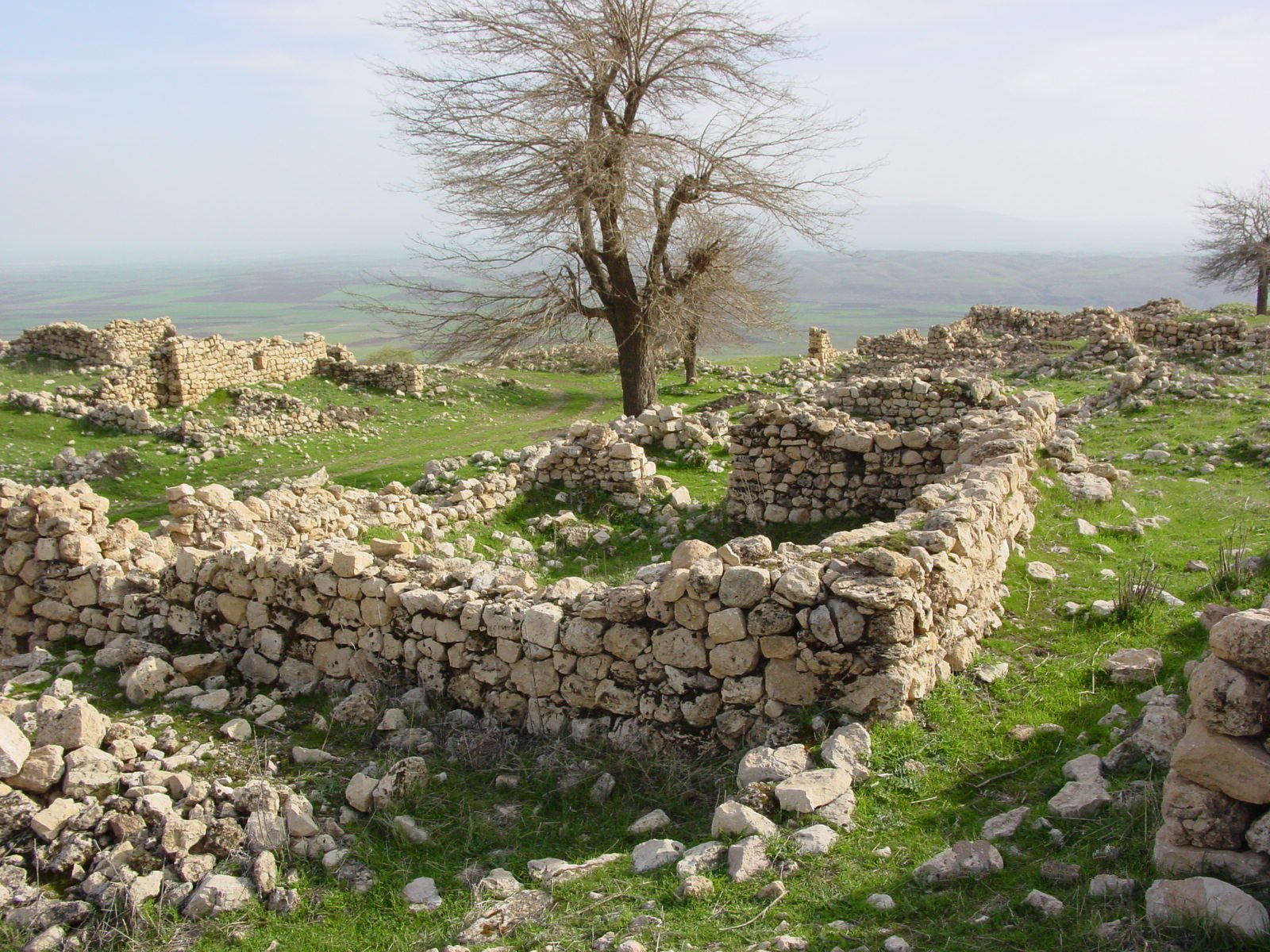

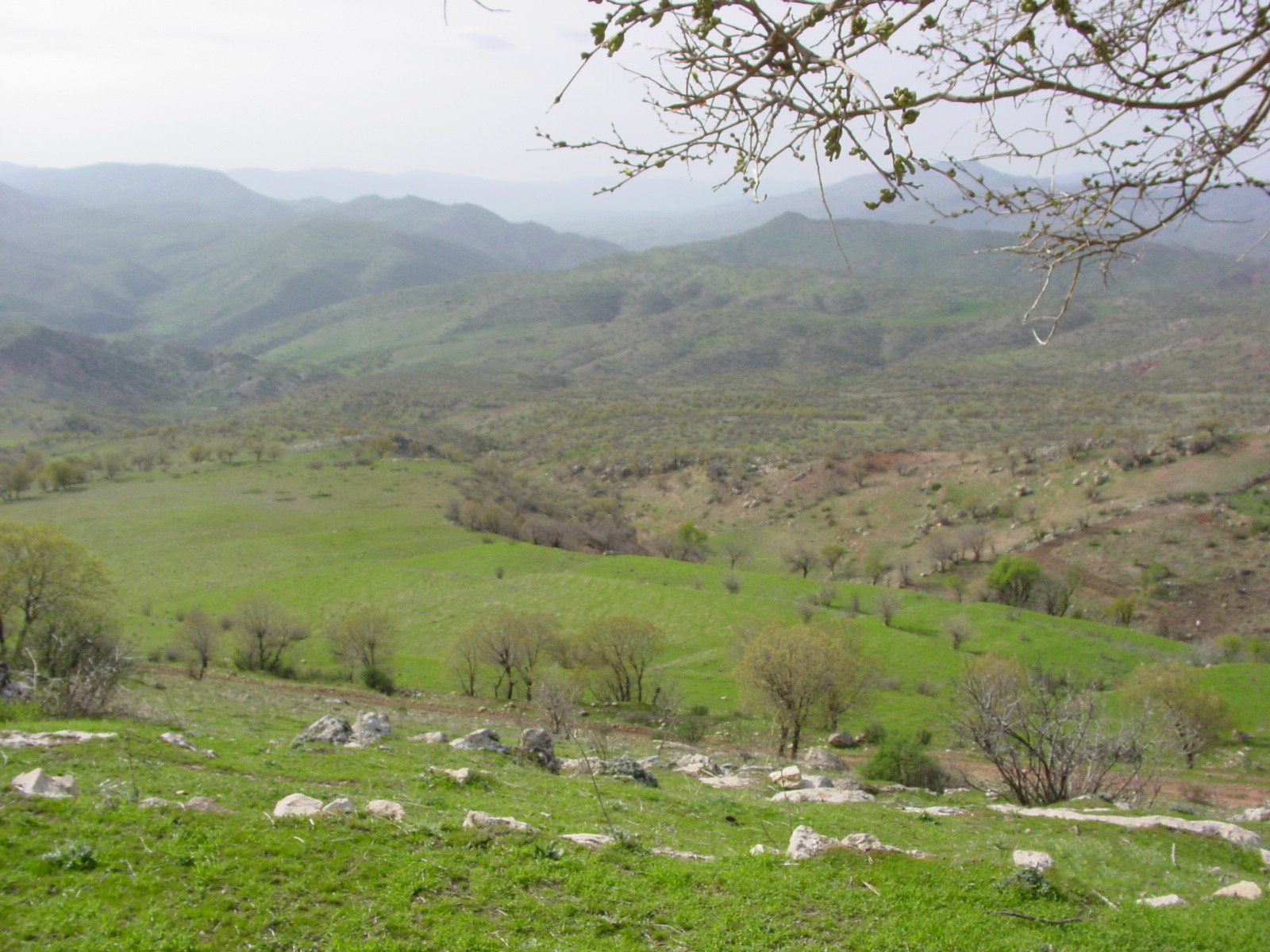

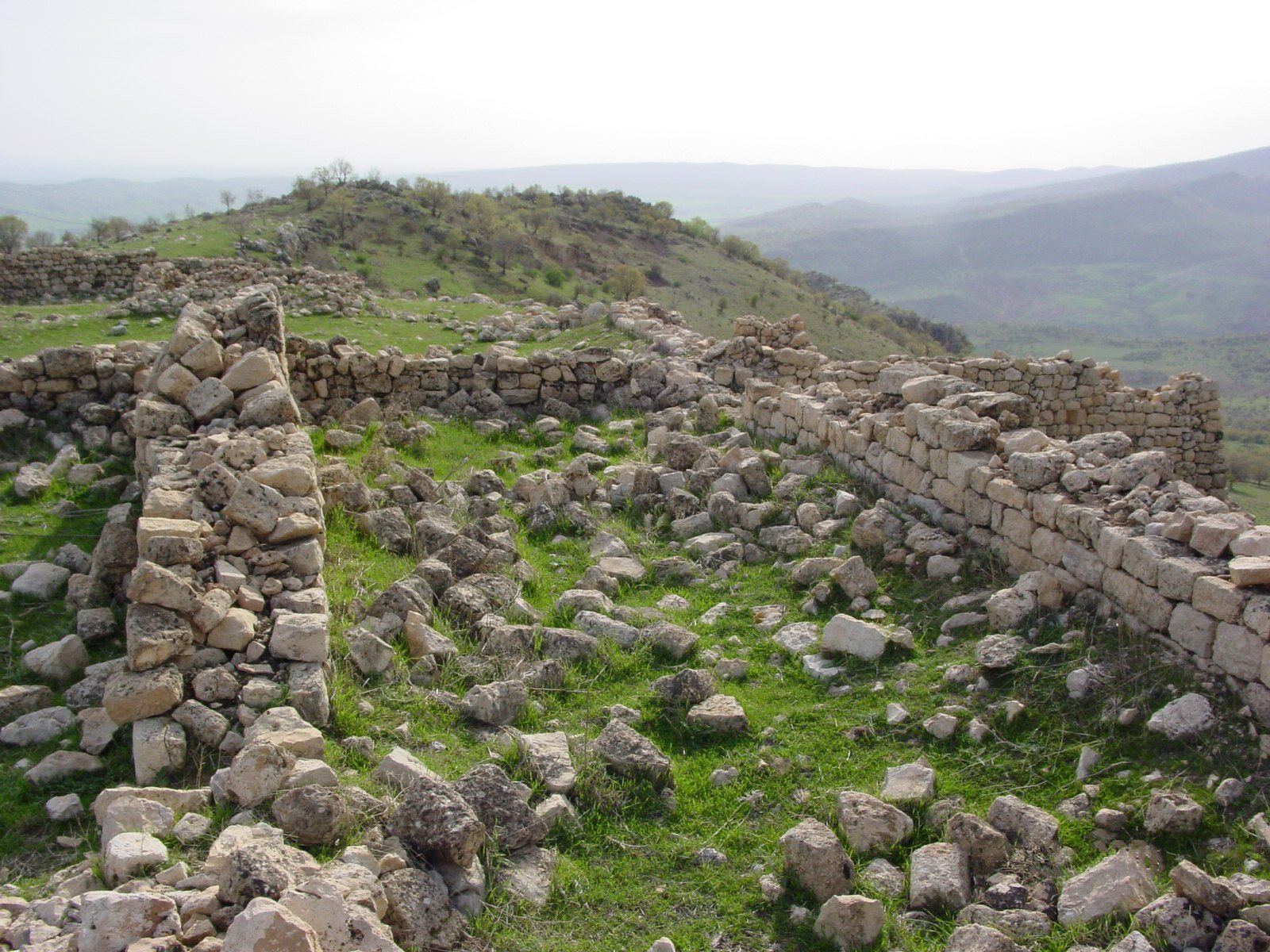

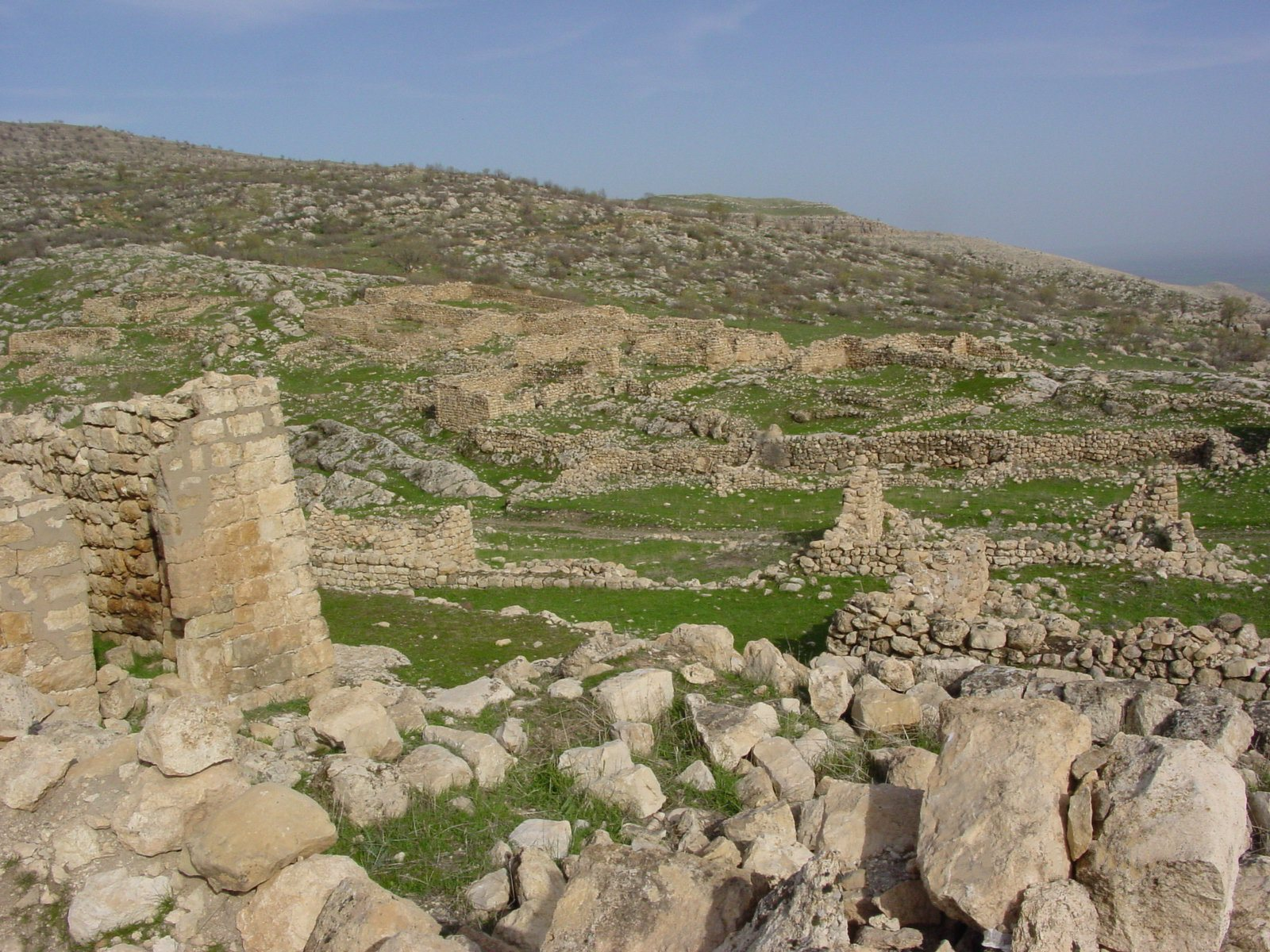

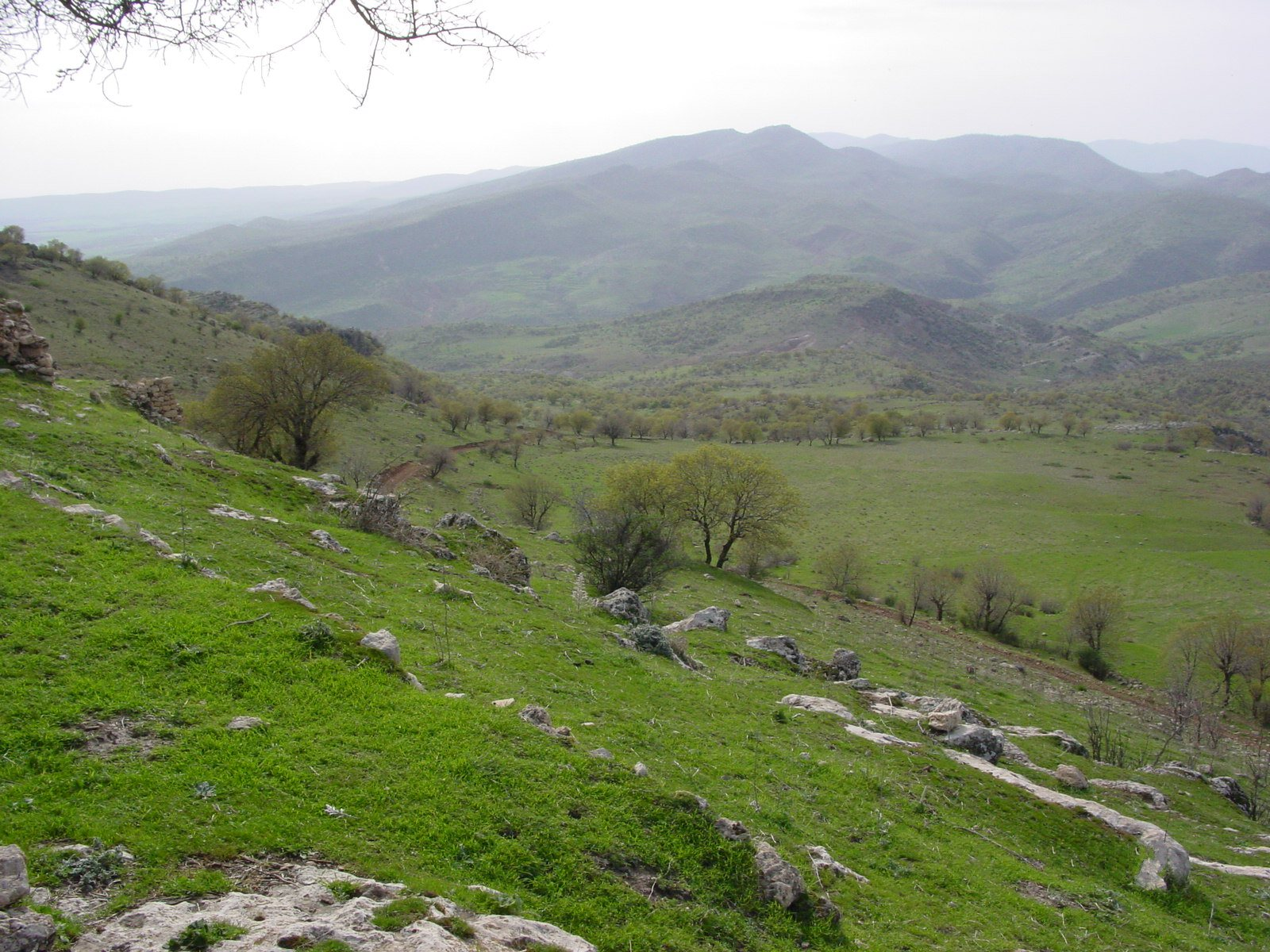
