= Keith Kirchoff =

- Education: New England Conservatory of Music and the University of Oregon
- Occupations: Pianist, composer, conductor, concert curator, and teacher
- Years active: ? - present
- Website: keithkirchoff.com//

Keith Kirchoff is a pianist, composer, conductor, concert curator, and music teacher who has performed in the United States and Europe. He has degrees from the New England Conservatory and the University of Oregon. Kirchoff performed over 100 new works and has performed the Boston premiere of Charles Ives's Emerson Concerto and the world premiere of Matthew McConnell's Concerto for Toy Piano.

== Awards ==
He has won many awards including:

- The 2006 Steinway Society Piano Competition
- The 2005 John Cage Award
- The Silver Lake International Piano Concerto Competition
- The Saint Paul Piano Teachers Association Competition
