= Faenol Festival =

Coordinates: 53.20126°N 4.1949°W

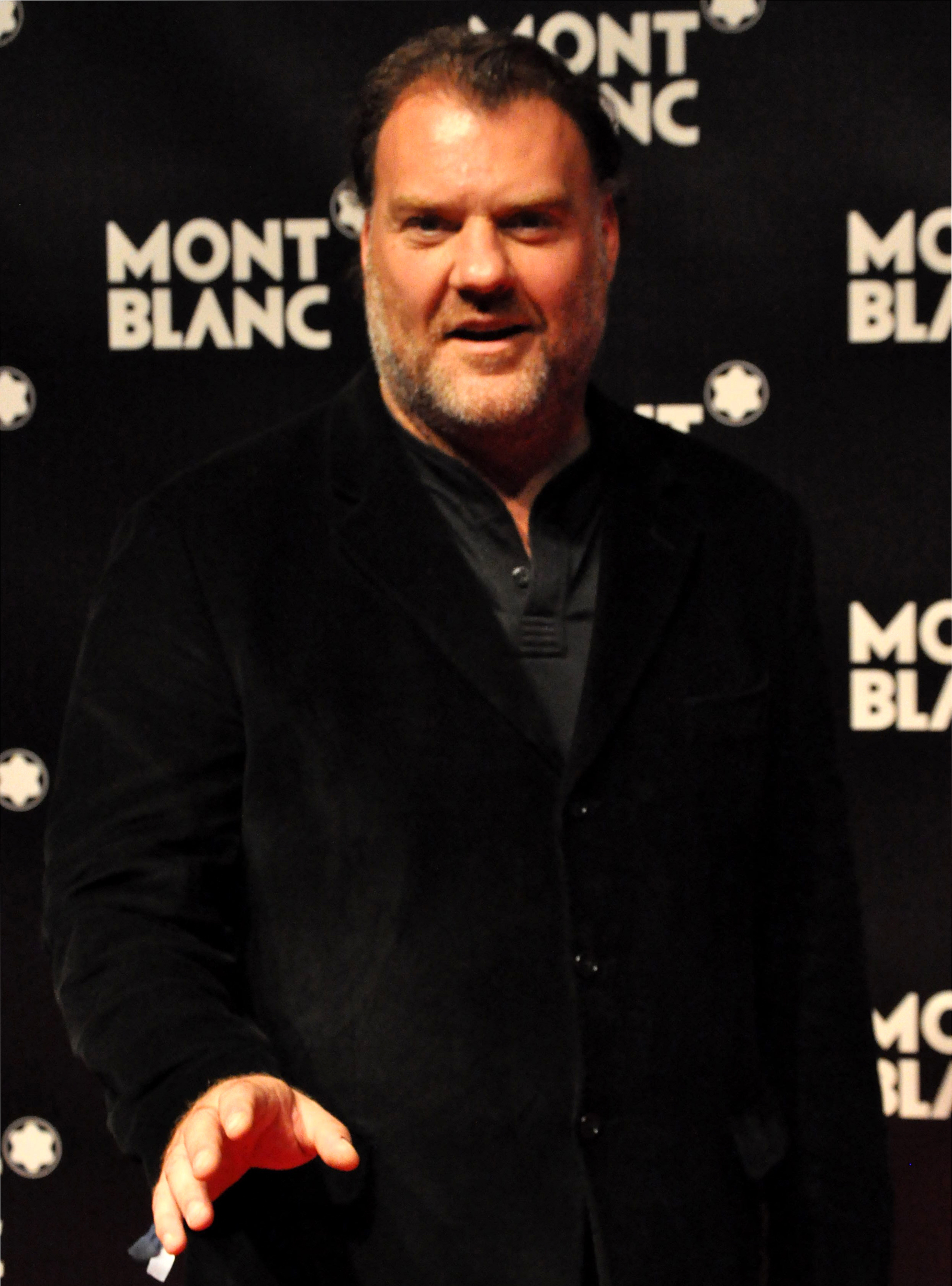
Bryn Terfel in New York, 2010

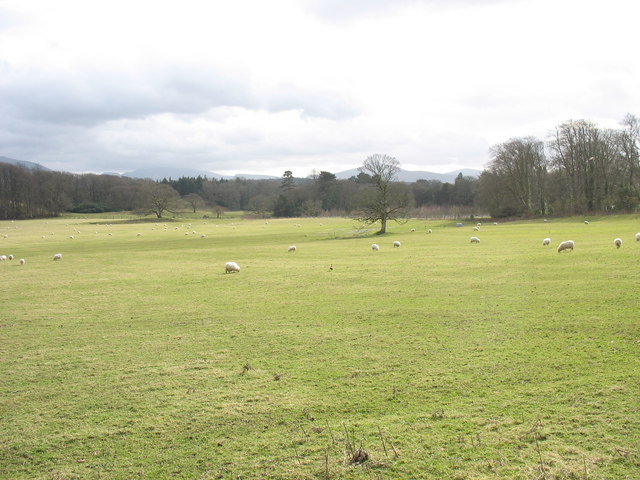
Parc Faenol, site of the festival

The Faenol Festival (Welsh: Gŵyl y Faenol) was a music festival organised by Welsh singer Bryn Terfel, originally held annually on the Faenol Estate (Welsh: Y Faenol), near Y Felinheli in Gwynedd, north Wales.

The festival was launched in 2000 and traditionally took place on August Bank Holiday weekend. It included both classical and Welsh popular music.

In 2006 the four-day festival was attended by over 35,000 people, a record figure for the event.

Cancelled in 2009, the festival was offered £250,000 of match funding over three years by the Welsh Assembly Government from 2010, but was cancelled in early August 2010 because of poor ticket sales. Scheduled headline act Westlife performed at Venue Cymru on 28 August 2010 instead.

There was no festival in 2011, with Bryn Terfel saying "I prefer people to see the loss of the festival rather than try again and possibly fail again .... Perhaps there is a need to restructure the festival."

In 2012 the Festival returned as part of the Southbank Centre's Festival of the World. It ran at the Festival Hall, London, on 4–7 July, and was designed as part of the run-up to the London 2012 Olympics.
