= Amal Hijazi =

Lebanese actress and singer (born 1977)

Amal Hijazi أمل حجازي
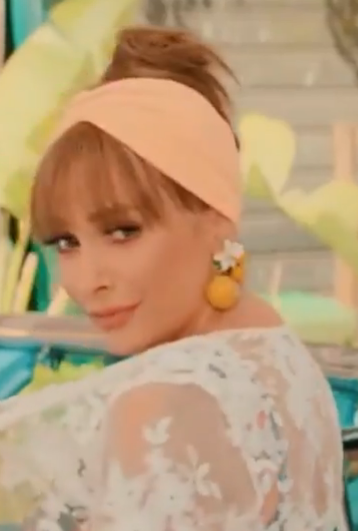

Background information
- Born: Amal Mahmoud Hijazi أمل محمود حجازي; 20 February 1977 (age 49); Beirut, Lebanon
- Genres: Arabic pop music; Islamic; Lebanese
- Occupations: Actress; singer
- Years active: 2000–2017
- Labels: Dilara Master (2000–2001); Music is My Life (2002–2003); Stallions Records (2004); Rotana (2004–2014)
- Website: www.amalhijazy.com

Amal Mahmoud Hijazi (Arabic: أمل محمود حجازي; born 20 February 1977) is a Lebanese actress and singer. Hijazi released her first record in 2001 and made her breakthrough a year later with her second album. In 2017 the BBC reported that her 2002 album Zaman was "one of the best selling Arabic pop records of all time".

She released her debut album, Akher Gharam, in 2001, followed by her second album, Zaman in mid-2002. The latter included four number one hit singles, "Zaman", "Oulhali", "Einak" and "Romansyia". Her third album Bedawwar A Albi was released in early 2004 followed by the release of her fourth album Baya al Ward in 2006.

In 2007 she released "Nefsy Tefhamny" and she released her fifth studio album, Keef el Amar, in 2008.

In September 2017 she announced that she was retiring from popular music and in December that year she released a song in honour of prophet Muhammad.

== Early life ==
Amal Hijazi was born in Beirut, Lebanon, to a Shia family originally from Kfarfila, a town in the Nabatieh Governorate, southern Lebanon. She has five siblings, and her father died when she was ten years old. She lived in France for ten years during the Lebanese Civil War, studied Architecture and graduated in 2001.

== Career ==
=== 2000–2003: Rise to fame ===
Her first single Halan ("Right Away") was released in 2000 and acted as a catalyst for Hijazi to establish herself as a female artist in Lebanon. Hijazi's managers asked her to record another. Hijazi's second single Rayyah Balak ("Put Your Mind at Ease") was released a year later, for which she also shot a music video. On the same year her debut album Akher Gharam was released followed the lead single of the same name. The album was produced by Dilara Master Production and distributed by Music Master.

Hijazi released her second studio album in 2002 Zaman (Long Ago). The title track, "Zaman" (cover of the Turkish song "Zaman" from Bendeniz, released in 2001) is still considered to be Hijazi's signature song.

Hijazi was invited by the Jordan River Foundation to hold a concert under the patronage of Queen Rania Al-Abdullah.

In 2003, she re-sang "Zaman" with Turkish singer Bendeniz for her album "Demedim Mi". A music video was released for the song and aired on Turkish as well as Arabic channels

=== 2006–2008: Baya al Ward and Keef el Amar ===
After an absence that lasted for more than two years, Hijazi released her fourth, studio album, Baya al Ward in 2006. The album generated negative reviews due to its bold lyrical content and unusual artwork. Hijazi had returned with a look that generated controversy when she appeared with short hair and clothes that "promoted homosexuality and lesbianism" according to critics.

A shirt Hijazi wore in the music video for the song Baya al Ward led to accusations that Hijazi was promoting homosexuality. Hijazi denied the allegations, clarifying she did not know what the symbols on the shirt meant. In the video, Hijazi cuts her hair off and drowns herself at the end out of depression over the man who left her.

In 2007, Hijazi released a new single, "Nefsy Tefhamny" which was a traditional and modern Khaleeji song. In 2008, Hijazi's released her fifth album Keef el Amar, which includes the single "Nefsy Tefhamny".

=== 2009–2017: Waylak Min Allah and Fen el Dameer ===
The album's second single "Albi Nadak" was released in 2009, a year later. Hijazi has stated that she has dedicated the song to motherhood and appears in the clip as a pregnant woman, the video was directed by Salem al Turk.

Amal Hijazi came out with the new album Waylak Min Allah, with a single from it released with the same title. The single has reached No. 1 in Lebanon and the story line of the video related to her husband betraying her love and also the country. The words mainly deal with his betrayal of her love and the time they spent together in the past, and reminiscence about time lost. At the end of 2011, Amal filmed a new video clip for her song "Ba'ayounak Za'al" followed by another video clip for the song "Be a'melni" early on 2012.

As the Arab revolutions began and the violation of human rights increased, Amal released her single "Fen el Dameer" "Where is the Conscience" in April 2013. The song lyrics dealt immediately with situation of the Arab World.

Hijazi filed a lawsuit against the music production company, Rotana, following their failure to stick to the terms and conditions of their contract.

=== 2017–present ===
Hijazi retired from artistic life in 2017. She contained to release occasional songs, primarily with religious themes. In 2025, she publicly shared that she had stopped wearing the hijab.

== Personal life ==
Hijazi married Mohammed al-Bassam in 2008; they have two children, Karim and Lareen. Hijazi was diagnosed with cancer in the 2010s, although she only communicated publicly about her chemotherapy treatments in 2025. Hijazi is a Shia Muslim.

== Controversies ==
=== Relationships with other singers ===
==== Elissa ====
Other than the heavy controversies behind her latest album, Hijazi has also been accused of imitating the popular Lebanese singer Elissa, especially in the video of Hijazi's hit song, "Bedawwar A Albi" ("Searching for my heart"). Hijazi however denied the accusations stressing that each of the singers has her own unique style. Hijazi added that her song was filmed long before Elissa's "Hubbak Waja" and had been airing on different satellite channels sometime in 2004.

Unlike the rumors, Hijazi stressed that she is not enemies with Elissa, stating, "We are merely two people who do not mix with one another, and if we by chance meet we just say 'hello.'" Hijazi also stated that she does not compete with any specific singer, but rather is inspired by the success of others and strives to always do her best.

In 2004, however, Hijazi put everything aside and made a personal visit Elissa to give her condolences after the latter lost her father to cancer. Elissa welcomed Amal with open arms and expressed her gratitude towards Amal's attempt to stand by her side at such a troublesome time.

==== Nancy Ajram ====
There were rumors of Hijazi criticising Nancy Ajram of singing on stage while pregnant. Hijazi has however denied the allegations stating, "All what I said is that I don't find it fit for a pregnant singer to perform on stage. I didn't hit on Nancy at all."

==== Nawal Al Zoghbi ====
Hijazi recently accused Nawal Al Zoghbi of stealing her contract with the Kuwaiti optical company, Fashion Look. Hijazi claimed that Al Zoghbi had instructed one of her business managers to request a lower fee from the company owner for producing the advertisement, thereby stealing the commercial. She stated that she had seen the contract that Al Zoghbi had signed with the company and discovered that she had been paid less than the initial offer.

=== Banning in Kuwait ===
In April, Hijazi expressed her shock at being banned from entering Kuwait despite her continuous efforts to travel there. The singer had submitted numerous requests to obtain a visa for both holding concerts for her Kuwaiti fans and for leisure, but all attempts were rejected. The singer stated that she was told that Kuwaiti officials had ordered for her ban without giving her any justifications. Hijazi noted that she will not let the matter be until she is able to find out the real reasons behind her ban.

== Image and fashion ==
In 2002, after the release of her album Zaman rumours arose that Hijazi was involved in a number of cosmetic surgeries due to her new look. Hijazi however denied the statements saying that she only had one plastic surgery and that was rhinoplasty. She added, "I refuse to insert silicon or any other thing into my body, and greatly fear the negative side effects too many plastic surgeries may have."

In 2005, Hijazi was especially chosen by the Lebanese designer Joe Raed as the model for his new line of wedding dresses to be released this summer season. Ra'ed revealed that he chose Amal for her good-natured qualities and her beauty.

Hijazi was named 8th Arab Sexiest Woman Alive in 2008, ahead of artists like Elissa, Nancy Ajram and Najwa Karam. In addition, Hijazi managed to receive twice as many votes as the Egyptian singer Sherine.

== Discography ==
Albums

- Akher Gharam (2001), Dilara Master Production
- Zaman (2002), Dilara Master Production
- Bedawwar A Albi (2004), Rotana Records
- Baya al Ward (2006), Rotana Records
- Keef el Amar (2008), Rotana Records
- Waylak Min Allah (2010), Rotana Records

Songs

- 2000: "Halan"
- 2002: "Zaman"
- 2002: "Weyli Wah" Ft. Omar and Rafi
- 2004: "Mistanie Eiy"
- 2005: "Bedawwar a Albi"
- 2005: "Jnoon Bihobak" with Rayan
- 2005: "Ba'ad Sneen"
- 2006: "Baya al Ward"
- 2007: "Baheb Nuoa Kalamak"
- 2007: "Nefsy Tefhamny"
- 2008: "Khalina Ne'oul" Ft. Iwan
- 2008: "Ahla Ma Fel Eyyam"
- 2009: "Deq El Mayy"
- 2009: "Alby Nadak"
- 2009: "Keef El Amar"
- 2010: "Waylak Min Allah"
- 2012: "B3younak Za3al"
- 2012: "Be3amelni"
- 2013: "Fen El Dameer"
- 2015: "El Layli"
