= Karim Al Iraqi =

Iraqi poet (1955–2023)

- Native name: كريم العراقي
- Born: February 18, 1955; Baghdad, Hashemite Kingdom of Iraq
- Died: September 21, 2023 (aged 68); Abu Dhabi, United Arab Emirates
- Occupation: Poet, writer,
- Language: Arabic

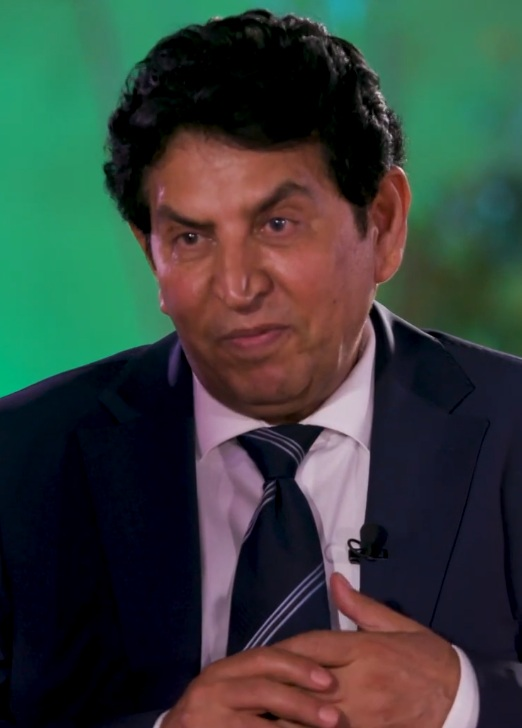
Karim Al Iraqi during a guest appearance on Al-Fujairah TV, May 13, 2019

Karim Al Iraqi (Arabic: كريم العراقي; 18 February 1955 – 1 September 2023) was an Iraqi poet. He published a wide variety of work including plays, essays, operettas, folk poetry, and songwriting.

Al Iraqi was born on 18 February 1955, and died of cancer in Abu Dhabi on 1 September 2023, at the age of 68.
