= Deus ex Machina (Daugherty) =

- by Michael Daugherty
- Genre: piano concerto
- Commissioned by: Charlotte, Nashville, New Jersey, Rochester and Syracuse Symphony Orchestras
- Performed: 16 March 2007: Blumenthal Arts Center

Deus ex Machina is a piano concerto by the American composer Michael Daugherty. The 33-minute work was jointly commissioned by the Charlotte, Nashville, New Jersey, Rochester and Syracuse Symphony Orchestras. It won the 2011 Grammy for Best Classical Contemporary Composition for a recording by soloist Terrance Wilson and the Nashville Symphony Orchestra under the baton of Giancarlo Guerrero.

Deus ex Machina was recorded and released on Naxos along with a work from earlier in Michael Daugherty's career, the Metropolis Symphony. The album was nominated for a total of 5 Grammys.

== Program note ==
The title refers to the Latin phrase, "god from the machine." Each of the three movements of the piano concerto is a musical response by the composer to the world of trains:

1. Fast Forward (Di andata veloce)
2. Train of Tears
3. Night Steam

== Instrumentation ==
Instruments used: piano, piccolo, two flutes, two oboes, English horn, two clarinets, bass clarinet, two bassoons, contrabassoon, four horns, three trumpets, three trombones, tuba, timpani, percussion and strings.

== Performance history ==
The world premiere performance was on March 16, 2007 at the Blumenthal Performing Arts Center, Belk Theater, Charlotte, North Carolina. It was premiered by the Terrence Wilson with the Charlotte Symphony, conducted by Giancarlo Guerrero. In 2010, an arrangement of Deus ex Machina by Bill Locklear was used by the Dutch Fork High School under the direction of Jon Brady and field direction of drum major Clark Cothran. The band placed 10th at the Bands of America Regional in Towson, MD.

== Discography ==
- DAUGHERTY, M.: Metropolis Symphony / Deus ex Machina (T. Wilson piano, Nashville Symphony, Guerrero conductor) 2009, Naxos.

== Accolades ==
In addition to Best Classical Contemporary Composition, it won in the categories of Best Orchestral Performance and Best Engineered Album, Classical.

== See also ==
- The Futurist Manifesto
- Assassination of Abraham Lincoln
- O. Winston Link
