= Baheb Nuoa Kalamak =

2007 single by Amal Hijazi

Single by Amal Hijazi

from the album Baya al Ward
- Released: Early 2007
- Recorded: Rotana
- Genre: Arabic Pop
- Length: 3:22
- Label: Rotana
- Songwriter(s): Ahmed Darwish

"Baheb Nuoa Kalamak" ("I love what you say") is an up-tempo Arabic pop song written by Ahmed Darwesh and chosen for Amal Hijazi's album, Baya al Ward, released in early 2007. The music video for the track was directed by Mirna Khayat, who was chosen over Yahia Sa’adeh.

== Synopsis ==
The song and video portray Hijazi as a young aristocratic girl on a car journey with her father, an elderly man. Seeing her lover's face besides a nearby mirror, she begins to daydream of him, and begins to sing as we see shots of her lover painting a portrait dedicated to her.

Hijazi is then seen sitting with her father and some other relatives who are busy talking. Hijazi expresses that she is extremely bored with them, and excuses herself, leaving the restaurant to meet her lover, who shows Hijazi her portrait.

The two young lovers dance and skip around, and at the end of the song as it is revealed she has left her father to join her lover.

== Chart performance ==
Baheb Nuoa Kalamak topped charts throughout the Arab World. It ranked #5 in the Pepsi Top Ten and was voted as one of the most popular videos aired on Rotana.
