= Claude Ledoux (composer) =

Belgian composer

Claude Ledoux is a Belgian composer, born in 1960. For many years now, the composer has explored the idea of "musical crossing borders" as he attempts to reflect our fragmented world in his musical processes. As a result, his works has been marked by interactions between contemporary sounds and popular musics, non-European idioms and technology. His recent works, accordingly, demonstrate this interest in the "cultural porosity" in which emotion arises from geographical and historical encounters, linking spirituality to the most sensual aspects of our material existence.

== Biography - early years ==
Passionated by science and art, Ledoux began at 17 y.o. his studies in painting and graphic Art at the Fine Arts School, coupled with music at the Conservatoire de Liège. There, he met Jean-Louis Robert, Philippe Boesmans, Frederic Rzewski, Henri Pousseur and decided for a musical career. He also carried out research into electronic music at the CRFMW studio (today Centre Pousseur) where he met Tristan Murail at the occasion of seminars.

Afterwards, Ledoux pursued his education abroad, notably in Hungary (at Béla Bartók seminar), in Italy (in Bolzano and Venice) where he participated in seminars by György Ligeti, and finally in Paris where he lived for few years on the occasion of IRCAM courses. At the same time, he studied composition with Iannis Xenakis at the University of Paris I.

== Competitions won ==
As a composer he won several competitions (including Lille, Paris and Lausanne). In 2003 he received the Musical Prize from the Civitella Ranieri Foundation of New York for his recent works. Afterwards, his music has been performed in many towns in Europe - For instance : Brussels [Ars Musica], Liege [Royal Philharmonic of Liege], Paris [Radio-France, Présences, L’Itinéraire, Intercontemporain...], Strasbourg [Musica], Berlin [WDR, Philharmonie]), Turkey [Ankara Radio Symphony orchestra), in Ukraine and Russia, more recently at the ISCM Ljublijana (at the orchestral opening concert 2015 with the Slovenian Radio Orchestra]. He has also performed in North America (Colorado Symphony orchestra and the Montreal Symphony Orchestra) and Asia (Vietnam, China, Japan). Latterly, Claude Ledoux has been composer in residence at the Ensemble Musiques Nouvelles (Belgium: 1998–2000), subsequently at the Castello of Umbria (Italy: 2003), the Brussels Bozar (2008–2009), Kitara Hall (Japan: 2009), and in Ars Musica (Brussels: 2012).

== Asian researches ==
Due to his passion for Asian sounds, he travelled in several eastern countries in order to undertake researches and to learn the traditional art of music. In 1992, he first went through India where he learned traditional musics from the Himalayan slopes to the Rajasthan desert. In 1996, he received a grant from the SPES Foundation to pursue his studies about oriental music in Vietnam, Cambodia and Indonesia. Afterwards, he travelled many times in Japan (from 2004 until now) where he went deeper into the knowledge of traditional musical practices and instruments of that country which counts as one of the most important for the composer. More recently he made also researches in China.

== Main musical activities ==
In 2009, Claude Ledoux composed the compulsory work for the semi-final of the Queen Elisabeth Competition. Later, in 2012, he served as artistic director of the Ars Musica Festival. in that framework, he composed "Ayl" for Clarinet and orchestra, based on an Armenian traditional tune. Afterwards, he wrote an important number of works with an Eastern dimension : "Crossing Edges" for erhu and orchestra, "Echoes of Crossing Edges" for the Shanghai Sinfonietta, "Eurydice effacée", commissioned by the Muromachi Ensemble (Tokyo), a Shakuhachi concerto for Reison Kuroda. In 2016 he composed the compulsory concerto for the Final of the Queen Elisabeth Competition, piano, "A Butterfly's Dream" - based on the Chinese Zhuangzi (book) - and his "Trois Itinérances" was premiered at Tokyo. Recently, "Noema" - Saxophone concerto - was premiered at the Saxophone International Contest of Dinant 2019. Moreover, "Tomoe", a fifty minutes "Rappresentatione" for Soprano, Baryton, Japanese Biwa/singer and baroque ensemble, was performed at the Festival de Wallonie (2020).

Some of his works are recorded on the labels Cyprès, Paraty, Harmonia Mundi, Sub Rosa, WBM.

== beside composition ==
Claude Ledoux earned a Master in "Art and Sciences of Music" (musicology and communication) from the University of Liège. Artistic Director (and founding member) of LAPS, a new ensemble that combines laptops with acoustic instruments, the composer has also written numerous articles on composition, analysis and contemporary music. Nowadays he also works as a musical journalist as well as a Musical Analysis professor at the CNSMDP - Conservatoire National Supérieur de Musique de Paris (France) and Composition professor at Arts2 - Visual/Music Art School, Music Conservatory of Mons (Belgium). He also taught these subjects at the Universities of São Paulo and Campinas (Brazil: 2008–09) and at the Shanghai Conservatory (China: 2014–15).

He is also member of The Royal Academies for Science and the Arts of Belgium since 2005.

== List of principal works ==
Orchestra :

- Desert Song and Dance for String orchestra - 2025
- Noema for alto saxophone and chamber orchestra - 2019
- Shakuhachi Konzert for shakuhachi and orchestra - 2016
- A Butterfly's Dream for piano and orchestra - 2016
- Crossing Edges for erhu and orchestra - 2014
- Spazio dei Sospiri - 2011
- Les Levants de Tiwanaku - 2008
- De memoire et d'oubli - 2005
- Adagio for strings - 2005
- Frissons d'Ailes for violin and orchestra - 2004
- Le Cercle de Rangda for piano and orchestra - 1999
- Musique concertante pour l'embarquement de Cythere for clarinet, tuba, piano and orchestra - 1986
- Evanescence for large orchestra - 1985

Chamber ensemble (with conductor) :

- LAPS Upgrade for amplified instruments and three laptops - 2015
- LAPS Init & PLS Ap Download for amplified instruments and three laptops - 2015
- A terra Sem Mal for amplified ensemble and electronics - 2011
- Sanaalijal for flute and ensemble - 2006
- Bell(e)...s for piano and ensemble - 2004
- Punch for 13 players - 2002
- Chat experiment for 7 players and electronics - 1998
- Torrent for cello and ensemble - 1995
- Etude aux Levants de Tiahuanaco for 7 players - 1992
- Liaisons pour Synonymes for sax and 9 players - 1986
- Liaisons for oboe/ English horn and 9 players - 1985

Chamber Music :

- FujiDaiko Echo for Noh voice and string quartet - 2021
- Erotique-Lancinante for fl, cl, vl, cello and piano - 2018
- Heavy Funk for four hands piano - 2011
- Suoni delicati - Harp septet - 2010
- Mensagem Ao Mar for piano trio - 2009
- V... for violin and piano - 2008
- Las Lagrimas de un Angel (An Angel's Tears) - 3rd string quartet - 2008
- Canto a due for B♭ clarinet and cello - 2007
- Piano quintet - 2005
- Play Time - 2nd string quartet - 2004
- Kyoko's Dance for violin and piano - 2002
- Bribes for soprano, alto flute, cello, piano - 2000
- Les Ruptures d'Icare L - 1st string quartet - 1993
- Miroirs de la transparence for violin, trombone and piano - 1993
- Un ciel fait d'herbes II for clarinet, violin, cello and piano - 1990
- Et le reve s'en fut... for clarinet, violin, percussion and piano - 1982

Solo instrument (or solo instrument and live electronics) :

- Entre-vagues for accordion - 2021
- Deux regards croisés for piano solo - 2020
- Japanese e-mails (for Sachiko Nomura, for Dai Fujikura, for Toshio Hosokawa, ...) piano solo cycle - work in progress) - 2015 / ...
- Dance with Rihanna (and Ligeti behind the door) for piano solo - 2012
- Album to the Youth - piano pieces for young pianist - 2012
- Zap's INIT for electric guitar - 2008
- Vertical Study for piano - 2007
- O Loli's dream for 5 strings viola - 2006
- Courbes d'etoiles I-V for piano - 1996–2004
- Shinjuku's blues for piano and live electronics - 2003
- Dolphin tribute (to Eric Dolphy) for bass clarinet (Bb) and live electronics - 2002
- L'aimer for violin - 1995
- Le Songe trouble de l'orchidee for cello - 1994
- 12 Studies for cello - 1994
- Les Ephemerides ininterrompues for piano - 1984

Vocal music :

- FujiDaiko Echo for Noh voice and string quartet - 2021
- Tomoe for voice/biwa, Soprano, baryton, baroque ensemble - 2020
- 3 Itinérances for soprano, alto saxophone (or bass clarinet) and piano - 2016/2020
- Eurydice Effacée for Japanese instruments, baroque instruments and tenor - 2014
- Notizen-Fragment I & II for voice and organ - 2013
- Passio secundum Lucam for soprano, mixed choir, organ and electronics - 2007
- Cri de blog for 5 singers - 2007
- Un ciel fait d'herbes I for alto (or contralto), clarinet and piano - 1990
- Ricciolina, chamber opera - 1985
