= 2025 in classical music =

This article is for major events and other topics related to classical music in 2025.

== Events ==
- 1 January
  - At the 2025 Vienna New Year's Concert, the Vienna Philharmonic Orchestra and Riccardo Muti perform the Ferdinandus-Walzer of Constanze Geiger, the first music by a female composer ever performed in the Vienna Philharmonic's Neujahrskonzert. The orchestra and conductor featured the same Constanze Geiger selection in the 30 December 2024 and 31 December 2024 performances at the Musikverein of the same programme.
  - The new all-female ensemble La Philharmonica gives its inaugural concert at the Ehrbarsaal, Vienna, with a programme of music by Leopoldine Blahetka, Gisela Frankl, Constanze Geiger, Joseph Hellmesberger Jr., Mathilde Kralik, Johann Strauss II, Maria Anna Stubenberg, and Josephine Amann-Weinlich.
- 6 January – The Moab Music Festival simultaneously announces the appointment of Tessa Lark as its next artistic director, and the retirement of its founding directors Michael Barrett and Leslie Tomkins.
- 9 January – The Luxembourg Philharmonic Orchestra announces the appointment of Martin Rajna as its next chief conductor, effective with the 2026–2027 season, with an initial contract of four seasons.
- 10 January – The Houston Symphony announces the appointment of Gary Ginstling as its next executive director and chief executive officer, effective 3 February 2025.
- 13 January – News reports confirm the destruction of Belmont Music Publishers, the publisher of the works of Arnold Schoenberg, with losses on the order of 100,000 scores and parts, as a result of the Palisades Fire.
- 14 January – Sony Music Entertainment announces its acquisition of Supraphon.
- 15 January
  - The Singapore Symphony Orchestra announces the appointment of Hannu Lintu as its next music director, effective with the 2026–2027 season, with an initial contract of three seasons. In parallel, the orchestra announces that Hans Graf is to stand down as its music director at the close of the 2025–2026 season.
  - The 19th century barge that served as the concert venue for Bargemusic is towed from its long-standing slip at Fulton Ferry Landing for scrappage at Staten Island, after evaluation and judgment that the barge was no longer viable to continue as a concert venue.
- 16 January
  - The Ernst von Siemens Musikstiftung announces its 2025 prizes:
    - Sir Simon Rattle is announced as the recipient of the 2025 Ernst von Siemens Music Prize.
    - Ashkan Behzadi, Bastien David and Kristine Tjøgersen are announced as the recipients of the 2025 Ernst von Siemens Composer Prizes.
  - The Cincinnati Symphony Orchestra announces the appointment of Robert McGrath as its next executive director and chief executive officer, effective 3 February 2025.
- 17 January – The Seattle Symphony announces the scheduled departure of Krishna Thiagarajan as its president and chief executive director, effective 30 April 2025.
- 24 January
  - Juanjo Mena discloses via social media his diagnosis of early-stage Alzheimer's disease.
  - The Orquestra de la Comunitat Valenciana announces the appointment of Sir Mark Elder as its next music director, effective 1 September 2025, with an initial contract of two years.
  - The first live performance of selections from the opera Morgiane, with music by Edmond Dédé, takes place at the St. Louis Cathedral (New Orleans), under a joint presentation by Opera Lafayette and OperaCréole.
- 27 January
  - The board of the Basque National Orchestra terminates the contract of Robert Treviño contract as its music director, with immediate effect.
  - The John F. Kennedy Center for the Performing Arts announces that Deborah Rutter is to stand down as its president at the close of 2025.
  - The Teatro Municipal de Santiago announces the appointment of Paolo Bortolameolli as the new principal conductor of the Orquesta Filarmónica de Santiago, with immediate effect, with a contract through 2028.
- 28 January – On Site Opera announces that it is to cease operations in the winter of 2025.
- 29 January – Opera Australia announces the departure of Fiona Allan as its chief executive officer, with immediate effect.
- 3 February – Opera Lafayette and OperaCréole jointly present the first complete performance of the opera Morgiane by Edmond Dédé at the Lincoln Theatre (Washington, D.C.)
- 4 February
  - The Royal Liverpool Philharmonic Orchestra announces the appointment of Vanessa Reed as its next chief executive, effective 2 June 2025.
  - New Music USA announces that Vanessa Reed is to stand down as its president and chief executive officer as of 2 May 2025.
- 6 February – Daniel Barenboim discloses via social media his diagnosis of Parkinson's disease.
- 7 February – The 'Joachim-Ma' Stradivarius violin sells for US$11.25 million at auction at Sotheby's, with proceeds from the sale to benefit a student scholarship programme at the New England Conservatory of Music.
- 10 February – The Kaufman Music Center announces the appointment of Anthony Mazzocchi as its next executive director.
- 12 February – The Antwerp Symphony Orchestra announces the appointment of Marc Albrecht as its next chief conductor, effective with the 2026–2027 season.
- 14 February – The Edmonton Symphony Orchestra announces the appointment of Jean-Marie Zeitouni as its next music director, effective with the 2025–2026 season.
- 18 February – The Vienna Radio Symphony Orchestra announces the appointment of Markus Poschner as its next chief conductor, effective with the 2026–2027 season, subject to the settlement of secure funding for the orchestra.
- 24 February – Michael Tilson Thomas announces via his website that his glioblastoma has returned and that he is curtailing his guest-conducting appearances, with his final conducting appearance scheduled for 26 April 2025 in San Francisco.
- 28 February –
  - Christian Tetzlaff announces the cancellation of his planned spring 2025 concert tour of the United States with his string quartet, in protest at US government policies.
  - Graham Parker stands down as chief executive officer of The Louisville Orchestra.
- 4 March – The Aizuri Quartet announces that it is to disband at the close of the 2024–2025 concert season, with its final performance scheduled for 25 April 2025.
- 5 March
  - The Staatsorchester Rheinische Philharmonie announces the appointment of Marzena Diakun as its next chief conductor, the first female conductor to be named to the post, effective with the 2026–2027 season.
  - The Handel and Haydn Society announces that David Snead is to retire from the posts of president and chief executive officer, effective May 2025.
- 6 March
  - Symphony Tacoma announces that Sarah Ioannides is to conclude her tenure as music director of Symphony Tacoma at the close of the 2025–2026 season.
  - The Royal Philharmonic Society Awards are announced at Royal Birmingham Conservatoire:
    - Chamber-Scale Composition: Sarah Lianne Lewis – letting the light in
    - Conductor: Kazuki Yamada
    - Ensemble: Paraorchestra
    - Gamechanger: NMC Recordings
    - Impact: Re:Discover Festival – Streetwise Opera
    - Inspiration: Open Arts Community Choir
    - Instrumentalist: Laura van der Heijden
    - Large-Scale Composition: Katherine Balch – whisper concerto
    - Opera and Music Theatre: Death in Venice – Welsh National Opera
    - Series and Events: The Cumnock Tryst
    - Singer: Claire Booth
    - Storytelling: Classical Africa – BBC Radio 3
    - Young Artist: GBSR Duo
- 10 March – The Norwegian Radio Orchestra announces the appointment of Holly Hyun Choe as its next principal conductor, the first female conductor to be named to the post, effective January 2026.
- 13 March
  - The Deutsches Nationaltheater und Staatskapelle Weimar announces the appointment of Daniel Carter as its next music director, effective with the 2025–2026 season.
  - The Eugene Symphony announces the appointment of Alex Prior as its next music director, effective with the 2025–2026 season, with an initial contract of four years.
  - The first public performance of the complete three-movement opus Míjející půlnoc (Vanishing Midnight) by Bohuslav Martinů takes place in Zlín, 103 years after its composition, with the Bohuslav Martinů Philharmonic Orchestra conducted by Robert Kružík.
  - The first documented public performance of music from the cantata Sémiramis by Maurice Ravel, the 'Prélude et Danse', is given by the New York Philharmonic and Gustavo Dudamel at David Geffen Hall, New York City.
- 19 March
  - Sir András Schiff announces the cancellation of his scheduled 2025–2026 concert appearances in the United States, in protest at US government policies.
  - The first performance of a rediscovered 1920 composition by Darius Milhaud, a setting for soprano and seven instruments of a text by Jean Cocteau composed for the birthday of Audrey Parr and found at the residence of Parr's granddaughter Laetitia Jack, takes place at Cardiff University School of Music.
- 23 March – The first performance of the Violin Concerto of Wilhelm Petersen, composed in the 1940s, takes place at the Gewandhaus, Leipzig, with soloist Linus Roth and the MDR Leipzig Radio Symphony Orchestra, conducted by Constantin Trinks.
- 1 April – Adrien Perruchon becomes principal conductor of the Bucheon Philharmonic Orchestra, the first non-Korean conductor to hold the post.
- 2 April – The municipality of Princeton, New Jersey formally takes ownership of the campus of Westminster Choir College.
- 3 April – The Netherlands Bach Society announces the appointment of Johanna Soller as its next artistic director, the first woman to hold the post, effective 1 May 2025, with an initial contract of five seasons.
- 10 April
  - The London Philharmonic Choir announces the appointment of Madeleine Venner as its chorus director, the first woman to be named to the post, effective with the 2025–2026 season.
  - The Staatstheater Braunschweig announces the appointment of Tobias Wolff as its next Generalintendant (General Director), effective in the autumn of 2026.
- 13 April – The Ukrainian pianist and organist Olena Kohut is killed as a result of a Russian missile attack on Sumy.
- 15 April
  - The Korean National Symphony Orchestra announces the appointment of Roberto Abbado as its new artistic director, effective January 2026, with an initial contract of three years.
  - Opera Colorado announces the appointment of Barbara Lynne Jamison as its next general director and chief executive officer, effective 1 August 2025.
  - Kentucky Opera announces that Barbara Lynne Jamison is to stand down as its general director at the close of the 2024–2025 season.
- 21 April – The Solti Foundation U.S. announces Holly Hyun Choe as the recipient of the 2025 The Sir Georg Solti Conducting Award.
- 23 April – The Philadelphia Orchestra announces the appointment of Ryan Fleur as its new president and chief executive officer, with immediate effect.
- 25 April
  - The Deutsches Symphonie-Orchester Berlin announces the appointment of Kazuki Yamada as its next chief conductor, effective with the 2026–2027 season, with an initial contract of three years.
  - Wolf Trap National Park for the Performing Arts announces the appointment of Daniel Hope as its next artistic advisor, effective with the 2025–2026 season.
- 26 April
  - The South Dakota Symphony Orchestra, conducted by Delta David Gier, presents the first live performance of the opera Giants in the Earth by Douglas Moore since 1974, in a new performing edition.
  - Michael Tilson Thomas conducts the final concert of his career, with the San Francisco Symphony.
- 29 April – The Southwest Florida Symphony Orchestra announces that it is to cease operations permanently at the close of June 2025.
- 1 May – The Delaware Symphony Orchestra announces the appointment of Michelle Di Russo as its next music director, the first female conductor to be named to the post, effective with the 2025–2026 season.
- 5 May The Monte-Carlo Philharmonic Orchestra announces that Kazuki Yamada is to conclude his tenure as its music director at the close of his current contract, in August 2026.
- 6 May
  - Mirga Gražinytė-Tyla conducts the Vienna Philharmonic Orchestra at the Konzerthaus, Vienna in the first subscription series concert in the orchestra's history with a female conductor.
  - The Caramoor Center for Music and the Arts announces the appointment of Gillian Fox as its next president and chief executive officer, effective 9 June 2025.
- 12 May – La Scala announces the appointment of Myung-whun Chung as its next music director, effective in 2027.
- 14 May
  - English National Opera announces the appointment of André de Ridder as its next music director, effective with the 2027–2028 season.
  - The city of Freiburg im Breisgau announces that André de Ridder is to stand down as Generalmusikdirektor (GMD) of the Theater Freiburg at the close of the 2026–2027 season.
  - The National Arts Centre Orchestra announces that Alexander Shelley is to conclude his tenure as its music director at the close of the 2025–2026 season.
- 28 May – The London Mozart Players announce that Flynn Le Brocq is to stand down as its chief executive officer at the end of August 2025.
- 29 May – The Ojai Music Festival announces that Ara Guzelimian is to stand down as its executive director at the close of the festival's 2026 season.
- 30 May – Los Angeles Opera announces the appointment of Domingo Hindoyan as its next music director, effective 1 July 2026, with an initial contract of five years.
- 3 June – The Chicago Symphony Orchestra announces the appointment of Donald Palumbo as the next director of the Chicago Symphony Chorus, effective 1 July 2025, with an initial contract of three years.
- 7 June – The Van Cliburn International Piano Competition announces the medal winners of the 2025 Cliburn Competition:
  - Gold Medal: Aristo Sham
  - Silver Medal: Vitaly Starikov
  - Bronze Medal: Evren Ozel
- 9 June – The Columbus Symphony Orchestra announces the appointment of Maureen O'Brien as its next chief executive officer, effective 15 July 2025.
- 11 June – The Newfoundland Symphony Orchestra announces the appointment of Simon Rivard as its new music director, effective 1 June 2025.
- 12 June – The Opéra de Montréal announces simultaneously the scheduled retirement of Patrick Corrigan as its general director and the appointment of Jean-Pierre Primiani as its new general director, both effective 1 November 2025.
- 13 June
  - The King's Birthday Honours 2025:
    - Alex Beard is made a Knight Bachelor.
    - David Pickard is made an Officer of the Order of the British Empire.
    - Ann Atkinson Sharp, Gabriella Di Laccio, and Angela Dixon are each made a Member of the Order of the British Empire.
  - The Maggio Musicale Fiorentino announces the appointment of Daniele Gatti as its next music director, as of the 2026 season, with an initial contract of 3 years.
- 23 June – The New Zealand Symphony Orchestra announces simultaneously the appointment of André de Ridder as its next music director and the scheduled conclusion of Gemma New's tenure as its principal conductor, both effective in 2027.
- 24 June
  - The Deutsche Oper am Rhein announces the appointment of Ina Karr as its new Generalintendantin (General Managing Director), the first woman to be named to the post, effective with the 2027–2028 season, with an initial contract of five years.
  - The Duisburg Philharmonic announces the appointment of Stefan Blunier as its next Generalmusikdirektor, effective with the 2026–2027 season, with an initial contract of three years.
- 25 June – The Philharmonia Baroque Orchestra announces the appointment of Peter Whelan as its next music director, effective with the 2026–2027 season, with an initial contract of three seasons.
- 27 June – The London Symphony Orchestra announces that Kathryn McDowall is to stand down as its managing director in July 2026.
- 30 June
  - The Czech Philharmonic announces the appointment of Jakub Hrůša as its next chief conductor and music director, effective with the 2028–2029 season, with an initial contract of five seasons.
  - The Governor General of Canada announces the appointment of Michel Cardin as a Member of the Order of Canada.
- 4 July The BBC Singers simultaneously announce the scheduled conclusion of the tenure of Sofi Jeannin as its chief conductor at the close of the 2025–2026 season, and the appointment of Owain Park as its next chief conductor, effective with the 2026–2027 season.
- 9 July – The Gran Teatre del Liceu announces simultaneously the scheduled conclusion of the tenure of Josep Pons as its music director, and the appointment of Jonathan Nott as its next music director, effective with the 2026–2027 season, with an initial contract of five years.
- 15 July – The Ministerium für Wissenschaft, Forschung und Kultur des Landes Brandenburg announces the appointment of Felix Mildenburg as the next chief conductor of the Brandenburg State Orchestra Frankfurt (Brandenburgischen Staatsorchesters Frankfurt), effective 1 August 2026.
- 16 July – The Nashville Symphony announces the re-appointment of Leonard Slatkin as its music advisor, effective with the 2025–2026 season, for a term of three seasons.
- 18 July
  - The Bayreuth Festival announces the appointment of Matthias Rädel as its next general manager.
  - The Minnesota Orchestra announces the appointment of Isaac Thompson as its next president and chief executive officer, effective 14 October 2025.
  - The Oregon Symphony announces that Isaac Thompson is to stand down as its president and chief executive officer (CEO), and that Paul Snyder is to become interim CEO upon the departure of Thompson.
- 21 July
  - The Orchestre national de Cannes announces the appointment of Holly Hyun Choe as its next music director, the first female conductor ever named to the post, effective with the 2026–2027 season, with an initial contract of four seasons.
  - The Un'Estate da RE Festival announces the cancellation of the previously announced concert scheduled for July 27 that was to have featured Valery Gergiev as conductor, in his first Western Europe concert following the 2022 Russian invasion of Ukraine.
- 29 July
  - The Staatstheater Nürnberg announces the appointment of Killian Farrell as its next Generalmusikdirektor, effective with the 2027–2028 season.
  - The Colorado Springs Philharmonic announces the appointment of Chloé Dufresne as its new music director, the first female conductor to be named to the post, effective with the 2025–2026 season, with an initial contract of three seasons.
- 31 July
  - The Bruckner Orchestra Linz announces the appointment of Christoph Koncz as its next chief conductor, effective with the 2027–2028 season, with an initial contract of five years.
  - The Nashville Symphony announces that Alan D. Valentine is to retire from the posts of president and chief executive officer of the orchestra, as of the close of the 2025–2026 season.
- 8 August – Portland Opera announces the appointment of Damian Jeter as its new music director, with immediate effect.
- 15 August – The first performance of the original French-language version of the one-act opera Mariken de Nimègue by Bohuslav Martinů, 92 years after its composition, takes place at the 2025 Bard Music Festival, conducted by Zachary Schwartzman.
- 26 August
  - The Oslo Philharmonic announces that Klaus Mäkelä is to conclude his tenure as chief conductor of the orchestra at the close of the 2025–2026 season.
  - Les Violons du Roy announces that Jonathan Cohen concluded his tenure as its music director at the close of the 2024–2025 season.
- 29 August – The protest group Jewish Artists for Palestine twice disrupts the Proms concert by the Melbourne Symphony Orchestra and Jaime Martín during the first Proms performance of Haunted Hills by Margaret Sutherland, in the wake of the legal dispute between the orchestra's management and Jayson Gillham, preventing an uninterrupted hearing of the Sutherland composition.
- 1 September – The Orchestre national d'Île-de-France announces simultaneously the scheduled conclusion of the tenure of Case Scaglione as its music director at the close of the 2026–2027 season, and the appointment of Pablo González as its next music director, effective with the 2027–2028 season, with an initial contract of four seasons.
- 2 September
  - The Orchestre de Paris announces the appointment of Esa-Pekka Salonen as its new principal conductor, effective with the 2027–2028 season, with an initial contract of five years.
  - The Philharmonie de Paris announces the appointment of Esa-Pekka Salonen to the newly created post of chaire Création et innovation ('creativity and innovation chair'), as of the 2027–2028 season, with an initial contract of five seasons.
  - The Los Angeles Philharmonic announces the appointment of Esa-Pekka Salonen to the new post of creative director, effective in 2026.
- 3 September – The National Arts Centre Orchestra announces the appointment of John Storgårds as its next music director, effective with the 2026–2027 season.
- 10 September – The Festival of Flanders cancels a previously scheduled concert with the Munich Philharmonic and Lahav Shani, citing a lack of 'sufficient clarity' on Shani's opinions regarding the Israeli government with respect to the Gaza conflict.
- 12 September – The Berlin Philharmonic announces that the Munich Philharmonic and Lahav Shani are to perform the concert originally scheduled for the Flanders Festival Ghent instead at the Konzerthaus Berlin on 15 September 2025, in the wake of the annulled invitation by the Flanders Festival Ghent of the originally scheduled concert by these artists on 18 September 2025.
- 13 September – Alison Balsom gives the final performance of her musical career at the Royal Albert Hall as part of the 2025 Last Night of The Proms.
- 17 September – The RTVE Symphony Orchestra announces simultaneously the appointment of Alexandre Bloch as its next chief conductor, effective with the 2026–2027 season, with an initial contract of three seasons, and the scheduled conclusion of the tenure of Christoph König as its chief conductor at the close of the 2025–2026 season.
- 21 September – The first performance of the one-act opera Parabola and Circula, composed in 1929–1930 with music by Marc Blitzstein and libretto by George Whitsett, takes place at the Berlin Philharmonie with the Norrköping Symphony Orchestra conducted by Karl-Heinz Steffens.
- 22 September
  - The Deutsche Oper Berlin announces the appointments of Maxime Pascal and Michele Spotti as co-principal guest conductors, and Titus Engel as 'conductor-in-residence', all effective in the summer of 2026.
  - The Teatro La Fenice announces the nomination of Beatrice Venezi as its next music director for the period of October 2026 to March 2030, without Venezi ever having conducted a full opera production or symphony concert with the company prior to her nomination.
- 24 September
  - The Tokyo Metropolitan Symphony Orchestra announces simultaneously the scheduled conclusion of the tenure of Kazushi Ōno as its music director in April 2026, and the appointment of Pekka Kuusisto as its new chief conductor, effective April 2028, with an initial contract of three years..
  - The Prague Radio Symphony Orchestra announces simultaneously the scheduled conclusionf of the tenure of Petr Popelka as its chief conductor at the close of the 2025–2026 season, and the appointment of Elias Grandy as its next chief conductor, effective with the 2026–2027 season.
  - The National Symphony Orchestra (Ireland) announces the appointment of Alexander Shelley as its next principal conductor, effective with the 2026–2027 season, with an initial contract of three seasons.
  - Portland Opera announces that Sue Dixon is to retire as its general director on 31 December 2025.
- 25 September
  - Kuke Music Holding Limited announces its acquisition of a controlling interest in Naxos Records.
  - The Royal Philharmonic Society awards Víkingur Ólafsson its Royal Philharmonic Society Gold Medal on-stage at the Royal Festival Hall.
- 26 September
  - The Chamber Orchestra of Philadelphia announces its departure from the Kimmel Center for the Performing Arts as a resident ensemble.
  - The musicians of the Vancouver Symphony Orchestra take industrial action, leading to concert cancellations.
- 27 September – The Thailand Philharmonic Orchestra announces the appointment of Carl St.Clair as its new music director.
- 30 September – Garsington Opera announces the appointment of Ben Weston as its new executive director, effective 10 November 2025.
- 6 October – The musicians of the Vancouver Symphony Orchestra reach an agreement with the Vancouver Symphony Society, concluding their industrial action.
- 7 October – The Swedish Radio Symphony Orchestra announces the appointment of Andrés Orozco-Estrada as its next chief conductor, effective with the 2026–2027 season.
- 10 October – The city of Bochum announces the appointment of Aurel Dawidiuk as the next Generalmusikdirektor of the Bochumer Symphoniker and Intendant of the Anneliese Brost Musikforum Ruhr, effective with the 2026–2027 season, with an initial contract of three years.
- 17 October – The originally scheduled season-opening night production of Wozzeck at La Fenice is cancelled, following previously proposed industrial action by the company orchestra's musicians in protest at the appointment of Beatrice Venezi as the company's next music director.
- 21 October
  - The International Chopin Piano Competition announces the results of the 2025 competition:
    - First place: Eric Liu
    - Second place: Kevin Chen
    - Third place: Zitong Wang
  - The London Mozart Players announce the appointment of Chrissy Kinsella as its next chief executive, effective 1 January 2026.
  - The Aspen Music Festival and School announces that Alan Fletcher is to retire as its president and chief executive officer effective 1 January 2027, and subsequently to take the title of president emeritus.
- 24 October – The National Youth Orchestra of Great Britain announces the appointment of Alpesh Chauhan as its new principal conductor and musical advisor.
- 27 October
  - The Sinfonietta de Lausanne announces the appointment of Lucie Leguay as its next music director, the first female conductor to be named to the post, effective with the 2026–2027 season, with an initial contract of three seasons. In parallel, David Reiland is scheduled to stand down as music director of the Sinfonietta de Lausanne at the close of the 2025–2026 season.
  - The Berlin Radio Choir announces the appointment of Yuval Weinberg as its next chief conductor, effective with the 2028–2029 season.
- 28 October – Les Violons du Roy announces the re-appointment of Bernard Labadie as its music director, effective with the 2026–2027 season.
- 1 November – Maria João Pires announces her retirement from concert performance at the award ceremony for the Prémio Europeu Helena Vaz da Silva para a Divulgação do Património Cultural.
- 5 November – Opera Ballet Vlaanderen announces the appointment of Stephan Zilias as its next chief conductor, effective in September 2026.
- 6 November – Houston Grand Opera announces the appointment of James Gaffigan as its next music director, effective with the 2026–2027 season, with an initial contract of five seasons.
- 7 November – The Spokane Symphony announces the appointment of Steve Wenig as its new executive director.
- 11 November
  - The Junge Deutsche Philharmonie announces the appointment of John Storgårds as its new principal conductor and artistic advisor, effective in 2026.
  - The Los Angeles Philharmonic announces the renaming of the mainstage of the Hollywood Bowl as the John Williams Stage.
- 17 November
  - In connection with the recent authentication by Peter Wollny of the Bach Archive, Leipzig, of two previously unidentified organ compositions by Johann Sebastian Bach, the Chaconne in D minor (BWV 1178) and the Chaconne in G minor (BWV 1179):
    - These two compositions are added to the official catalogue of compositions of J. S. Bach.
    - The first live performances of these two works take place at St. Thomas Church, Leipzig, performed by Ton Koopman.
  - Orchestra Lumos announces the appointment of Walker Beard as its next president and chief executive officer, effective 1 January 2026.
- 18 November – English National Opera announces that Jenny Mollica is to stand down as its chief executive officer in the summer of 2026.
- 20 November – The Oregon Symphony announces the appointment of Paul Snyder as its next president and chief executive officer, with immediate effect.
- 26 November – Kari Kriikku announces his retirement from musical performance.
- 27 November – The Ulster Orchestra announces the appointment of Anna Handler as its next chief conductor, effective with the 2026–2027 season, with an initial contract of three years.
- 5 December – The Schleswig-Holstein Musik Festival announces Birke Bertelsmeier as the recipient of its Hindemith-Preis ('Hindemith Prize') for 2026.
- 9 December – The National Arts Centre (Canada) announces the appointment of Annabelle Cloutier as its new president and chief executive officer, with immediate effect, with an initial contract of five years.
- 10 December – The Monte-Carlo Philharmonic announces the appointment of Nathalie Stutzmann as its next music director and artistic director, the first female conductor to be named to the posts, effective with the 2026–2027 season, with an initial contract of four years.
- 12 December – The Teatro di San Carlo presents the world premiere performance of Partenope, the only opera composed by Ennio Morricone, to a libretto by Guido Barbieri and Sandro Cappelletto.
- 15 December – Sabine Meyer gives the final concert of her career in Bern, with the Alliage Quintet.
- 17 December – Detroit Opera announces that Yuval Sharon is to stand down as its artistic director at the close of the 2025–2026 season, two years ahead of his most recent contract.
- 18 December – Tellef Johnson gives the premiere performance of the Piano Sonata No. 5 (Opus archimagicum) by Kaikhosru Shapurji Sorabji, composed in 1934-1035, at South Dakota State University.
- 22 December – The Royal Society of Musicians announces the appointment of Errollyn Wallen as its new president.
- 26 December – The KBS Symphony Orchestra announces the re-appointment of Myung-whun Chung as its music director, effective in January 2026, with an initial contract through December 2028.
- 29 December – New Year Honours 2026:
  - Alice Coote, Richard Farnes, and Max Richter are each made a Commander of the Order of the British Empire (CBE).
  - Richard Morrison is made a Member of the Order of the British Empire (MBE).
- 30 December – Barry Truax is appointed a Member of the Order of Canada.

== New works ==
- John Adams
  - After the Fall (piano concerto)
  - The Rock You Stand On
- Lara Agar – Suntime Bedtime Moontime
- Dieter Ammann – No Templates (viola concerto)
- David Amram – Five American Songs
- Mark Andre – Im Entfalten. Dem Andenken an Pierre Boulez
- Georges Aperghis – Tell Tales
- Rafael Marino Arcaro – Invention in Language of Child
- Matthew Aucoin – Song of the Reappeared (texts by Raúl Zurita)
- Sally Beamish – Field of Stars
- Sir George Benjamin – 'Interludes and Aria' from Lessons in Love and Violence
- Lisa Bielawa – PULSE (violin concerto)
- Kathryn Bostic – Drag
- Rodolphe Bruneau-Boulmier – Caída libre
- Kieran Brunt – The Hologram of St. Cecilia
- Jay Capperauld – Bruckner’s Skull
- John Casken – Mantle (for piano and wind quintet)
- Alice Chance – Iuvenia
- Raven Chacon – inscription
- Imsu Choi – Miro
- Arowah (Anjelica Cleaver) – 'In This World Of War, Peace is What We're Fighting For'
- Anna Clyne – The Eye
- Erland Cooper – Birds of Paradise
- Maria Thompson Corley (music) and T. Lloyd Thompson (text) – The Convex Beauty of Sailing Souls
- Tom Coult – Monologues for the Curious
- Chaya Czernowin – The Divine Thawing of the Core
- Jonathan Cziner – Concerto for Clarinet and Orchestra
- Aftar Darvishi – Likoo
- Olivia Davies – Confluence
- Brett Dean – String Quartet No. 4 ('A Little Book of Prayers')
- Jasdeep Singh Degun – Abbhā (A Tribute to Ustad Vilayat Khan)
- Donnacha Dennehy – Hard Landing
- Bernd Richard Deutsch – Urworte (texts of Johann Wolfgang von Goethe)
- Alma Deutscher – The Euterpides
- Jasper Dommett – King Torques Hollow Acetate
- Hanna Eimermacher – Aura
- Melody Eötvös – Baelō
- Turgut Erçetin – There recedes a silence, faceting beyond enclosures
- Ricardo Ferro – Apsinthos
- Edmund Finnis – Cello Concerto
- Mary Finsterer – Auxilium Christianorum
- Leonard Fu – Popular Dances
- Stacy Garrop – Invictus (piano concerto)
- Nicholas Gawley – Appalachia
- Michael Gordon – The Forest of Metal Objects
- Helen Grime (music) and Zoe Gilbert (text) – Long Have I Lain Beside the Water (for soprano, flute, clarinet, string trio and harp)
- Moni Jasmine Guo – the sound of where I came from 乡音
- Elis Hallik – Oriri
- Hanna Hartman – Advanced Weather Information Processing System
- Jake Heggie (music) and Gene Scheer (text) – Crossing Borders
- Sarah Hennies – The Blue Hour
- Laure M. Hiendl – The deepest continuity is paradoxically that which continually restarts and renews itself
- Timothy Higgins – Market Street, 1920s
- Anders Hillborg – Hell Mountain (Homage to Mahler)
- Sebastian Hilli – 1977: A Violin Concerto
- Natalie Holt – Eyjafjallajökull
- Simon Holt – Acrobats on a loose wire (for flute and string trio)
- Sir Stephen Hough – Nocturne for September 10th 2001
- Stefan Huecke – The Glory of Life (trumpet concerto)
- Oswald Huýnh – Nước
- Mirela Ivičević – Red Thread Mermaid
- Sir Karl Jenkins – 'The Signs Still Point the Way'
- Gordon Kampe (music) and Dieter Sperl (text) – Die Kreide im Mund des Wolfs
- Elena Kats-Chernin – Rainbow Promise
- Victoria Kelly – Stabat Mater
- Alexander Khubeev – Garmonbozla
- Omri Kochavi – Gilufim
- Noriko Koide – Whale
- Roland Kunz – Drei späten Lieder
- Anna Korsun – Vivrisses
- Han Lash – Zero Turning Radius
- Thomas Larcher – returning into darkness (cello concerto)
- James Lee III – Fanfare for Universal Hope
- Philippe Leroux – Paris, Banlieue (Un informe journal de mes rêveries)
- Lei Liang – A Book of Time I
- Allison Loggins-Hull – Grit. Grace. Glory
- Steven Mackey – The Ancestors: ballet in eight tableaux
- Sir James MacMillan – 'Where the Lugar meets the Glaisnock' (euphonium concerto)
- Philipp Maintz – jag die hunde zurück! (for six sopranos and six percussionists, after Ingeborg Bachmann)
- Caroline Mallonee – Lakeside Game
- Colin Matthews – Canon for soprano and piano trio
- David Matthews – Serenade and Tango
- Jessie Montgomery – Chemiluminescence
- Carman Moore – A Village Triptych
- Nico Muhly – Doom Painting
- Thea Musgrave – In memoriam 2022
- Alex Nante – Anāhata
- Angélica Negrón – for everything you keep losing
- Sarah Nemtsov
  - Sephirot
  - from shore to shore
- Olga Neuwirth – Tombeau II: Hommage à Pierre Boulez
- Koka Nikoladze – Masterpiece
- Pavel Zemek Novák – Canto
- Kris Oelbrandt – Passion of Innocence
- Nkeiru Okoye – And The People Celebrated
- Camille Pépin – Fireworks
- Vanessa Perica – String Quartet No. 1 ('No feeling is final')
- Naomi Pinnock – I put lines down and wipe them away
- Sepehr Pirasteh – will the mountains sing for me
- Peggy Polias – Cameo
- Rachel Portman – 'The Gathering Tree' (text by Nick Drake)
- Kevin Puts – House of Tomorrow (text by Kahlil Gibran)
- Ellen Reid – Earth Between Oceans
- Mariam Rezaei – The Scholar's Record
- Joey Roukens – Violin Concerto ('Out of the Deep')
- Christopher Sainsbury – Concertino for Flute
- Fazıl Say – Mandolin Concerto
- Andrea Lorenzo Scartazzini – Enigma
- Enjott Schneider – Kabbala – The Paths of Light
- Sasha Scott – Sly
- Nina Shehkar – Accordion Concerto
- Sean Shepherd – Quadruple Concerto (Concerto for Flute, Oboe, Clarinet and Bassoon)
- Donghoon Shin – Piano Concerto
- Jonathan Shin – Piano Concerto
- Thomas Simaku – Catena IV
- Mark Simpson – ZEBRA (or, 2–3–74: The Divine Invasion of Philip K. Dick)
- Rakhi Singh – 'There is nothing in the sky'
- Carlos Simon (music), Marc Bamuthi Joseph and Courtney Ware (text) – Good News Mass
- Mark Simpson – Zebra (or, 2–3–74: The Divine Invasion of Philip K Dick)
- Zygmund de Somogyi
  - music for the quarter-life crisis (synth étude)
  - IN THE EVENT THAT YOU STAY (Trio for flute, cello, and piano No. 1)
- Gabriella Smith – Rewilding
- Kate Soper – Orpheus Orchestra Opus Onus
- Paul Stanhope – Mahāsāgar
- Dobrinka Tabakova – Concerto for Accordion and Orchestra
- Hawar Tawfig – rIJks
- Karen Tanaka – Echoing Souls
- Conrad Tao – The Hand (for piano and orchestra)
- Christopher Theofanidis – Indigo Heaven (clarinet concerto; composition from 2023)
- Anna S. Þorvaldsdóttir – Before we fall (cello concerto)
- Mark-Anthony Turnage – Sco (guitar concerto)
- Francesca Verunelli – La nuda voce
- Aleksandra Vrebalov – Love Canticles
- Errollyn Wallen
  - Remembering 2012
  - The Elements
- Huw Watkins
  - Concerto for Orchestra
  - Octet
- Mindy Meng Wang – Concerto for Guzheng and Orchestra
- Lotta Wennäkoski – Vents et lyres (recorder concerto)
- Ryan Wigglesworth – for Laura, after Bach
- Jörg Widmann – Cantata in tempore belli
- John Williams – Concerto for Piano and Orchestra
- Ayanna Witter-Johnson – Bacchanale

== New operas ==
- Jasmine Arielle Barnes and Deborah D.E.E.P. Mouton – She Who Dared
- Gerald Barry – Salome
- Charlotte Bray and Colum McCann – American Mother
- Unsuk Chin – Die Dunkle Seite des Mondes (The Dark Side of the Moon)
- Johanna Doderer and Peter Turrini – Der tollste Tag
- Francesco Filidei (music and libretto) and Stefano Busellato (libretto) – Il nome della rosa
- Beat Furrer and Thomas Stangl – Das grosse Feuer
- Damien Geter and Jessica Murphy Moo – Loving v. Virginia
- Detlev Glanert and Carlo Pasquini – Die drei Rätsel
- John Glover and Kelley Rourke – Eat the Document
- Ricky Ian Gordon (music), Lynn Nottage and Ruby Aiyo Gerber (libretto) – This House
- David Hanlon and Stephanie Fleischmann – The Pigeon Keeper
- Jennifer Higdon and Jerre Dye – Woman With Eyes Closed
- Toshio Hosokawa and Yoko Tawada – Natasha
- Huang Ruo and David Henry Hwang – The Monkey King
- Daniel Kessner and Lionelle Hamanaka – The Camp
- Amy Beth Kirsten – Infernal Angel
- Elmar Lampson and Julia Spinola – Wellen (Waves)
- Philippe Manoury (music), Patrick Hahn, Philippe Manoury, and Nicolas Stemann (libretto) – Die letzten Tage der Menschheit
- Paola Prestini and Magos Herrera – Primero Sueño (text by Juana Inés de la Cruz)
- Rebecca Saunders and Ed Atkins – Lash
- Bent Sørensen and Jon Fosse – Asle and Alida
- Miroslav Srnka and Tom Holloway – Voice Killer
- Christopher Theofanidis and Melissa Studdard – Siddhartha, She
- Eric Tuan (music and text), Emily Jiang and Daryl Ngee Chinn (text) – Echoes of Eureka
- Mark-Anthony Turnage and Lee Hall – Festen
- Mark-Anthony Turnage and Rachel Hewer – The Railway Children
- Ludiger Vollmer and Jenny Erpenbeck – Rummelplatz
- Ludiger Vollmer and Martin G. Berger – Frühlings Erwachen
- Jennifer Walshe and Mark O'Connell – Mars
- Michael Wertmüller and Roland Schimmelpfennig – Echo 72

== Recordings ==
- Dominick Argento and Charles Nolte – The Voyage of Edgar Allan Poe (first recording)
- Claudio Arrau – The Ambassador Auditorium Recitals
- Sir Granville Bantock and Marjory Kennedy-Fraser – The Seal Woman (first commercial recording)
- Henriëtte Bosmans – Cello Concertos (first recordings), Poème
- Pierre Boulez – Livre pour quatuor (first recording of full six-movement version, with reconstructed fourth movement completed by Philippe Manoury; Quatuor Diotima)
- Havergal Brian – 'Complete Choral Songs, Volume I' (first recordings)
- Justin Connolly – 'Music for Strings (plus...)' (first recordings)
- Donnacha Dennehy – Land of Winter
- Michael Finnissy – Piano Works
- Ruth Gipps – Orchestral Works, Vol. 3 (including first recording of her Symphony No. 1)
- Sofia Gubaidulina – Figures of Time
- Georg Friedrich Haas – Violin Concerto No. 2 (first recording) / de terrae fine (for violin solo)
- Sir Stephen Hough – Piano Concerto ('World of Yesterday') / Partita / Sonata nostalgica (first recordings)
- Tania León – Horizons (second recording); Raíces (Origins), Stride, Pasaje (first recordings)
- Radu Lupu – The Unreleased Recordings
- Wynton Marsalis – Blues Symphony (Detroit Symphony Orchestra, Jader Bignamini))
- David Matthews – Flute Concerto / Symphony No.11 / Anna: Symphonic Diptych (first recordings)
- Meredith Monk – Cellular Songs
- Joseph Phibbs, Jörgen Dafgård, and Geoffrey Gordon – Music from Malmö, Volume One: Three New Concertos for Bass Clarinet (first recordings)
- Francesco Scarlatti – Daniele (first recording)
- Robert Simpson – Chamber Music, Volume One (first recordings of the String Quartet in D Major; 'Trocknet nicht'!; 'The Cherry Tree', Trio for Clarinet, Cello and Piano; Quintet for Clarinet, Bass Clarinet and Three Double Basses)
- Gregory Spears – Seven Days (first commercial recording)
- Sir Michael Tippett – New Year (first complete recording)
- Verdi – Simon Boccanegra (1857 version, first recording)
- Errollyn Wallen – 'Orchestral Works'

== Deaths ==
- 1 January
  - Jean-Michel Defaye, French pianist, composer, arranger and conductor, 92
  - Nora Orlandi (Joan Christian), Italian pianist, violinist, soprano and composer, 91
- 2 January – Wilhelm Brückner, German luthier, 92
- 7 January – Ayla Erduran, Turkish violinist, 90
- 9 January – Otto Schenk, Austrian opera director and actor, 94
- 11 January – Mario Klemens, Czech conductor, 88
- 13 January
  - Walter Deutsch, Austrian composer, musicologist, pianist, and radio and television presenter, 101
  - Elgar Howarth, British conductor, composer and trumpeter, 89
- 17 January
  - Mary O'Reilly, American-born orchestral violinist active in The Netherlands, 71
  - Herbert Henck, German pianist, 76
- 18 January – Claire van Kampen, British pianist, composer, arranger, and playwright, 71
- 26 January – Kazuyoshi Akiyama, Japanese conductor, 84
- 30 January – İlhan Usmanbaş, Turkish composer, 104
- 3 February – Paul Plishka, American bass, 83
- 5 February – Hans-Peter Lehmann, German opera director, 90
- 9 February – Edith Mathis, Swiss soprano, 86
- 10 February – Maria Tipo, Italian pianist, 93
- 12 February – Denis Wick, British orchestral trombonist, 92
- 16 February – Vladimír Válek, Czech conductor, 89
- 20 February – Ilkka Kuusisto, Finnish opera composer, conductor, choirmaster, and organist, 91
- 25 February
  - Simon Lindley, English organist, choirmaster, conductor and composer, 76
  - Ferenc Rados, Hungarian pianist, 90
- 26 February – James Lockhart, British conductor, 94
- 2 March – Dieuwertje Blok, Dutch classical radio presenter, 67
- 13 March – Sofia Gubaidulina, Tatar-Russian composer, 93
- 17 March – Scott Nickrenz, American violist and arts administrator, 87
- 24 March – Alan Cuckston, British harpsichordist, pianist, conductor, and lecturer, 85
- 26 March
  - Leo Boudewijns, Dutch radio presenter and writer on music, 93
  - Nicolas Kynaston, British organist, 83
- 30 March – Enrique Bátiz, Mexican conductor and pianist, 82
- 31 March – John Nelson, American conductor, 83
- 9 April – Roberto Cani, Italian orchestral violinist, 57
- 10 April – Niklas Eklund, Swedish trumpeter, 56
- 14 April
  - Christian Elliott, Canadian cellist, 41 (death announced on this date)
  - Peter Seiffert, German tenor, 71
- 15 April – Joel Krosnick, American cellist and member of the Juilliard String Quartet, 84
- 16 April – Peter Ablinger, Austrian composer, 66
- 17 April – Erhard Grosskopf, German composer, 91
- 21 April – Martin Longborough, British opera administrator and founder of Longborough Festival Opera, 83
- 24 April – Kari Løvaas, Norwegian soprano, 85
- 25 April – Richard Wernick, American composer and academic, 95
- 29 April
  - Christfried Schmidt, German composer and arranger, 92
  - Bernard Garfield, American orchestral bassoonist, 100
- 1 May – Victor Aviat, French oboist and conductor, 42
- 2 May – Pierre Audi, Lebanon-born arts administrator and stage director (theatre, opera), 67
- 7 May
  - Ronald Corp, British composer and conductor, 74
  - Marinus Komst, Dutch orchestral timpanist, 72
- 11 May
  - Matthew Best, British bass, conductor, composer, arranger, editor and pedagogue, 67
  - Alena Veselá, Czech organist and musical teacher, 101
- 12 May
  - Ernst Mahle, German-Brazilian orchestra composer and conductor, 96
  - Yasunao Tone, Japanese avant-garde composer, 90
- 13 May – David Watkin, British cellist, conductor, musicologist, and pedagogue, 60
- 15 May – Luigi Alva, Peruvian tenor, 98
- 16 May – Jadwiga Rappé, Polish alto, 73
- 22 May – Guy Klucevsek, American accordion player, 78
- 28 May – Per Nørgård, Danish composer, 92
- 29 May – Charles Wadsworth, American pianist, arts administrator, and founder of the Chamber Music Society of Lincoln Center, 96
- 4 June – Rodolfo Saglimbeni, Venezuelan conductor, 62
- 13 June – James Fankhauser, USA-born choral conductor, teacher and tenor resident in Canada, 85
- 17 June
  - Alfred Brendel, Czech-born Austrian pianist, 94
  - Charles Burrell, American orchestral double bassist and the first African-American double bassist of a major American orchestra, 104
- 18 June – Teet Järvi, Estonian cellist, 67
- 26 June – Alan Harler, American choral conductor, 85
- 29 June
  - Stuart Burrows, Welsh tenor, 92
  - Kenneth Freed, American orchestral violist, 64
- 30 June – Gilda Cruz-Romo, Mexican soprano, 85
- 2 July
  - Diana McVeagh, British music scholar, 98
  - Bas Ramselaar, Dutch bassoonist, 64
  - David Fenwick Wilson, American-born Canadian music scholar, organist, conductor, pedagogue and writer, 95
- 6 July – Helena Tattermuschová, Czech soprano, 92
- 7 July – Fox Fehling, American orchestral violinist, 76
- 11 July – Raymond Guiot, French flautist, composer and pedagogue, 94
- 16 July – Gary Karr, American double bassist, 83
- 18 July – Sir Roger Norrington, British conductor and advocate of the Historically informed performance movement, 91
- 19 July – Béatrice Uria-Monzon, French mezzo-soprano, 62
- 21 July – David Rendall, British tenor, 76
- 26 July – Jill Pasternak, American classical radio presenter and harpist, 91
- 27 July – Daniel Lentz, American composer, 83
- 31 July – Robert Wilson, American theatre and opera director, 83
- 11 August – Choo Hoey, Singaporean conductor, 94
- 21 August – Kurt-Hans Goedicke, Germany-born orchestral timpanist active in the UK, 90
- 29 August – Rodion Shchedrin, Russian composer, 92
- 1 September – Lionel Sawkins, Australia-born musicologist resident in the UK, 96
- 6 September – Christoph von Dohnányi, German conductor, 95
- 8 September – John Kitchen, British orchestral violinist, 87 (death announced on this date)
- 14 September – Siegmund Nimsgern, German bass-baritone, 85
- 21 September – Roland Pidoux, French cellist, 78
- 23 September – Dieter Kaufmann, Austrian avant-garde composer, 83
- 27 September
  - Franz Grundheber, German baritone, 88
  - Martin Neary, British choral conductor and organist, 85
- 29 September – Denis Raisain Dadre, French recorder player and Renaissance music specialist, 69 (body found on this date)
- 2 October – Cristian Ganicenco, Romania-born orchestral trombonist resident in the USA, 59:
- 5 October – Louis Lanza, Jr., American orchestral violinist, 89
- 10 October – Bernhard Klee, German conductor, 89
- 14 October – Roberta Alexander, American soprano, 76
- 23 October – Kaja Borris, Dutch soprano, 86
- 24 October
  - Maarten Brandt, Dutch musicologist, 72
  - Benita Valente, American soprano, 91
- 31 October – Eike Wilm Schulte, German bass-baritone, 86
- 9 November – Stefka Evstatieva, Bulgarian soprano, 78
- 11 November – Gary Lakes, American tenor, 75
- 12 November – Juraj Lexmann, Slovak composer and musicologist, 84
- 13 November
  - Sir Donald McIntyre, New Zealand-born bass-baritone, 91
  - Michael Davis, British orchestra leader (London Symphony Orchestra, The Hallé), 80
- 14 November – Matthias Schuke, German organ builder, 70
- 17 November – Grigoriy Korchmar, Russian composer and pianist, 77
- 19 November – Jean-Claude Éloy, French composer and pedagogue, 87
- 21 November – Leon Bates, American pianist, 76
- 27 November – Neil Watson, British orchestral violinist, 97
- 2 December – Margaret Jane Wray, American soprano, 62
- 5 December – Frank Gehry, American architect, 96
- 8 December – Jubilant Sykes, American baritone, 71
- 10 December – Jet (Henriëtte) Röling, Dutch pianist, 86
- 13 December – Anda-Louise Bogza, Romanian soprano, 60
- 15 December – Thomas Johannes Mayer, German baritone, 56
- 17 December – Sir Humphrey Burton, British broadcaster, television producer, author, and arts administrator, 94
- 18 December – Yvonne Naef, Swiss mezzo-soprano, 68
- 19 December – Natalya Boyarskaya, Russian violinist and pedagogue, 79
- 23 December – Justus Zeyen, German pianist, 62 (death announced on this date)
- 24 December – Iurie Mahovici, Moldovan pianist and pedagogue, 63
- 26 December – Robert Massard, French baritone, 100
- 27 December – Gary Graffman, American pianist, pedagogue, and music education administrator, 97
- 28 December – Bruce Crawford, American advertising executive, past general manager of the Metropolitan Opera, and arts administrator, 96
- 29 December – Jan Novotný, Czech pianist, 90
- 30 December – Ulrich Eckhardt, German arts administrator, 91
- 31 December – Peter-Lukas Graf, Swiss flautist and conductor, 96

== Major awards ==
- 2025 Pulitzer Prize for Music: Susie Ibarra – Sky Islands

=== 2025 Musical America Award Winners ===
- Artist of the Year: Barbara Hannigan
- Composer of the Year: Jake Heggie
- Instrumentalist of the Year: Víkingur Ólafsson
- Vocalist of the Year: Angel Blue
- Director of the Year: James Robinson

=== 2025 Grammy Awards ===
- Best Chamber Music/Small Ensemble Performance: Rectangles and Circumstance, Caroline Shaw and Sō Percussion (Nonesuch)
- Best Choral Performance: Ochre (compositions by Ayanna Woods, George Lewis, Caroline Shaw); The Crossing; Donald Nally, conductor (Navona Records)
- Best Classical Compendium: Gabriela Ortiz – Revolución Diamantina, Los Angeles Philharmonic, Gustavo Dudamel, conductor; Dmitriy Lipay, producer (Los Angeles Philharmonic)
- Best Classical Instrumental Solo: Johann Sebastian Bach – Goldberg Variations; Víkingur Ólafsson (Deutsche Grammophon)
- Best Classical Solo Vocal Album: Beyond the Years — Unpublished Songs of Florence Price; Karen Slack, Michelle Cann (Azica Records)
- Best Instrumental Composition: Pascal Le Boeuf – 'Strands'
- Best Opera Recording: Kaija Saariaho – Adriana Mater; Fleur Barron, Axelle Fanyo, Nicholas Phan, Christopher Purves; San Francisco Symphony, San Francisco Symphony Chorus; Esa-Pekka Salonen, conductor; Jason O'Connell, producer (SFS Media)
- Best Engineered Album, Classical: Bruckner – Symphony No. 7 / Mason Bates – Resurrexit; Pittsburgh Symphony Orchestra; Manfred Honeck, conductor; Mark Donahue and John Newton, engineers; Mark Donahue, mastering engineer (Reference Recordings)
- Best Orchestral Performance: Gabriela Ortiz – Revolución Diamantina, Los Angeles Philharmonic, Gustavo Dudamel, conductor (Los Angeles Philharmonic)
- Producer of the Year, Classical: Elaine Martone

=== Gramophone Classical Music Awards 2025 ===
- Chamber: Brahms – Piano Quartets Nos. 2 & 3; Krystian Zimerman, Maria Nowak, Katarzyna Budnik, Yuya Okamoto (Deutsche Grammophon)
- Choral: Johann Sebastian Bach – Mass in B minor; Pygmalion; Raphaël Pichon (harmonia mundi)
- Concept Album: Colouring Book – George Xiaoyan Fu (Platoon)
- Concerto: Elgar – Violin Concerto; Vilde Frang; Deutsches Symphonie-Orchester Berlin; Robin Ticciati (Warner Classics)
- Contemporary: Sir George Benjamin and Martin Crimp – Picture a day like this; Marianne Crebassa, Beate Mordal, Cameron Shahbazi, John Brancy, Anna Prohaska; Mahler Chamber Orchestra; Sir George Benjamin (Nimbus)
- Early Music: The Krasiński Codex; Ensemble Dragma, Ensemble Peregrina; Agnieszka Budzińska-Bennett (Raumklang)
- Instrumental: Paganini – Caprices; María Dueñas (Deutsche Grammophon)
- Opera: Wagner – Der fliegende Holländer; Lise Davidsen, Gerald Finley, Brindley Sherratt, Stanislas de Barbeyrac, Anna Kissjudit, Eirik Grøtvedt; Chorus and Orchestra of Norwegian National Opera; Edward Gardner (Decca)
- Orchestral: The Kurt Weill Album – Konzerthausorchester Berlin, Katharine Mehrling, Joana Mallwitz (Deutsche Grammophon)
- Piano: Brahms – Piano Sonata No 1 / Schubert – Wanderer Fantasy; Alexandre Kantorow (BIS)
- Song: Songs for Peter Pears – Robin Tritschler, Philip Higham, Malcolm Martineau, Sean Shibe (Signum Classics)
- Voice and Ensemble: Contemplation – Huw Montague Rendall; Opéra Orchestre Normandie Rouen; Ben Glassberg (Erato)
- Recording of the Year: Johann Sebastian Bach – Mass in B minor; Pygmalion; Raphaël Pichon (harmonia mundi)
- Lifetime Achievement: Sir Thomas Allen
- Label of the Year: Palazzetto Bru Zane
- Young Artist of the Year: María Dueñas
- Artist of the Year: Sir Simon Rattle
- Orchestra of the Year: Bergen Philharmonic Orchestra
