= Miguel del Águila =

Uruguayan-born American composer

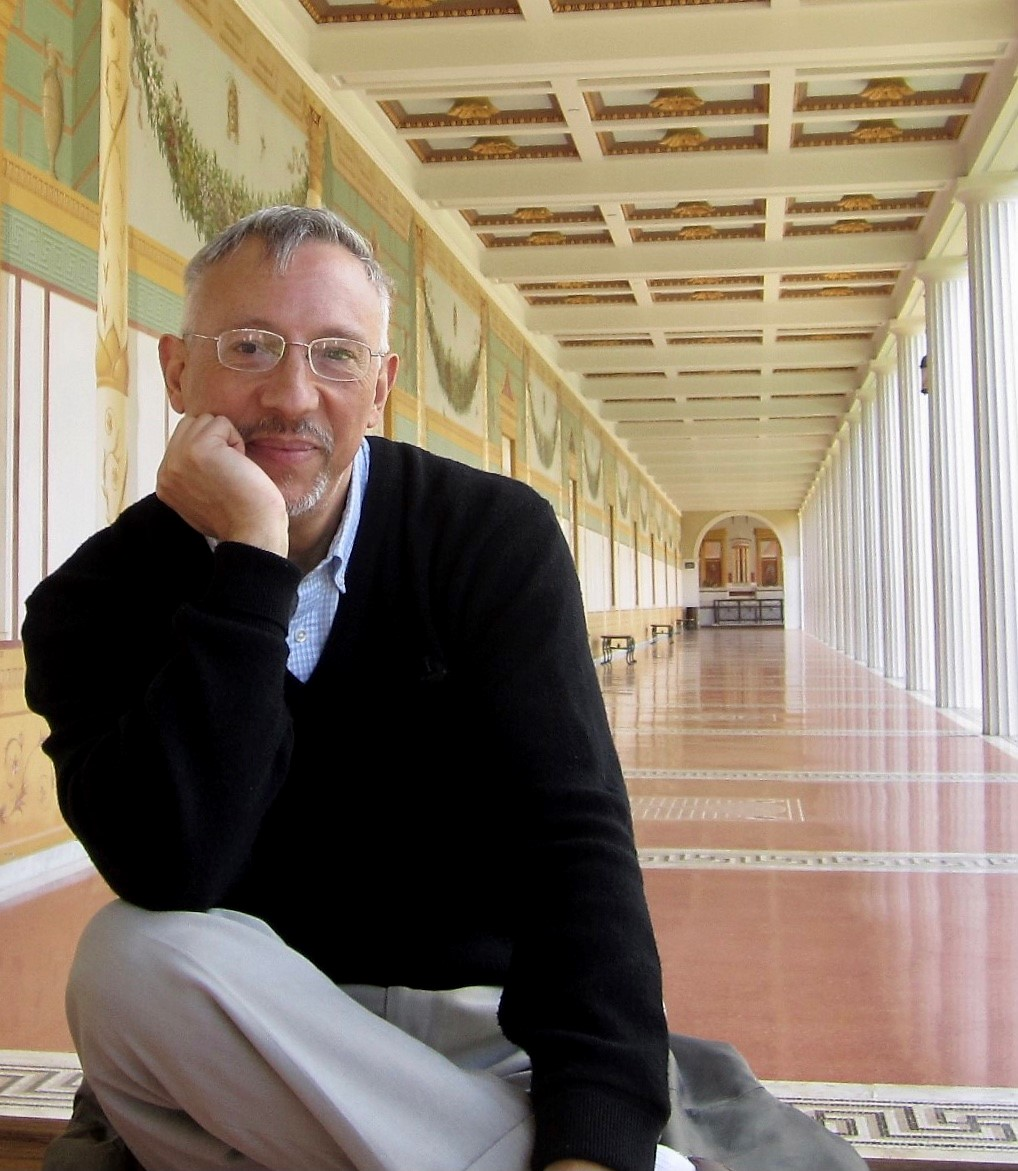
Miguel del Águila Miguel del Aguila composer
- Born: 15 September 1957 (age 69); Montevideo, Uruguay
- Occupation: Composer
- Awards: Kennedy Center Friedheim Award, Latin Grammy nominations (2010, 2015)

Miguel del Águila (born September 15, 1957, in Montevideo) is a Uruguayan American composer of classical music. He has been nominated for the Grammy Awards three times and has received other honors, such as the Kennedy Center Friedheim Award.

== Life ==
In 1978, he moved to California, fleeing Uruguay's 1970s military government. He graduated from the San Francisco Conservatory of Music and studied at the Hochschule für Musik and Konservatorium in Vienna. Early premieres of his works in Vienna's Musikverein, Konzerthaus, and Bösendorfer halls introduced his music and distinctive Latin sound to European audiences.

In 1989, del Águila's work was performed in New York's Carnegie Recital Hall (now Weill Hall), and Lukas Foss conducted the US premiere of Hexen with the Brooklyn Philharmonic. CDs of his works were released on Albany Records and KKM-Austria by 1990, including his Clarinet Concerto, Herbsttag and Hexen.

He returned to the US in 1992, and in 1998 the Los Angeles Times described him as "one of the West Coast's most promising and enterprising young composers." He received the Kennedy Center Friedheim Award in 1995, and was music director of Ojai Camerata until 1999. He was resident composer at the Chautauqua Institution Summer Festival from 2001 to 2005.

Del Águila was among the first composers chosen by "Meet the Composer" and The American Symphony Orchestra League to receive a "Music Alive" Extended Residency grant, which resulted in the 2006 opera Time and Again Barelas, a partnership between the New Mexico Symphony and the National Hispanic Cultural Center in Albuquerque. Joanne Sheehy Hoover of the Albuquerque Journal wrote that the opera displayed "command of an arresting musical vocabulary, marked by a complex yet infectious rhythmic vitality."

In 2008, del Águila received a "Magnum Opus" commission, administered by "Meet the Composer," for performances by the Nashville Symphony, Buffalo Philharmonic, Virginia Symphony, and Winnipeg Symphony orchestras. The resulting tone poem, The Fall of Cuzco, was premiered by the Nashville Symphony, conducted by Giancarlo Guerrero, in November 2009. In 2008–09, del Águila received the Lancaster Symphony's Composer Award. His Choral Suite No. 2 for mixed chorus and orchestra was performed by the symphony, conducted by Stephen Gunzenhauser, in November 2008.

In 2010, del Águila received two Latin Grammy nominations, the first for the Bridge CD Salón Buenos Aires (for Best Classical Album), and the second for his work Clocks (Best Classical Contemporary Composition), performed by Camerata San Antonio. Clocks also received a Copland Foundation Recording Award in 2009. In 2015, he received a third Grammy nomination for his Concierto en Tango (Best Classical Contemporary Composition), commissioned, premiered and recorded by the Buffalo Philharmonic with cello soloist Roman Mekinulov and conducted by JoAnn Falletta.

Recordings of del Águila's over 140 works have been released on 67 CD albums to date by Naxos, Dorian, Telarc, New Albion, Albany, Centaur and Eroica, among others. Peermusic Classical and Theodore Presser have both published his works; many others he has self-published.

== Compositions ==
=== Chamber ===
Chamber works without piano

- Boliviana – guitar and string quartet (20:00)
- Herbsttag (Autumn Day) – flute, bassoon, harp (7:30)
- Hexen – bassoon, string ensemble (12:00)
- Life is a Dream – string quartet (15:00)
- Malambo – bassoon and string quartet (13:00)
- Nostalgica – string quartet, bassoon (19:00)
- Pacific Serenade – string quartet, clarinet (optional saxophone) (16:00)
- Presto a Cuatro – guitar quartet (optional: 4 guitars, 4 strings) (6:00)
- Presto II – string quartet (6:00)
- Submerged – flute, viola, harp (10:00)
- The Day After – four cellos (3:00)
- Wind Quintet No. 2 – flute, oboe, clarinet, horn, bassoon (30:00)
- Procession of Lunatics – four cellos (9:00)

Chamber works with piano

- Broken Rondo – English horn, piano (13:00)
- Caribbean Bacchanal – 2 pianos / 8 hands (13:00)
- Charango Capriccioso – string quartet, piano (14:00)
- Clarinet Concerto – clarinet, piano (17:00)
- Clocks – string quartet, piano (17:00)
- Conga-Line in Hell – chamber ensemble (11:00)
- Conga-Line in Hell – flute, clarinet, harp, piano, percussion, 8 cellos (11:00)
- Conga-Line in Hell – six pianos (13:00)
- Hexen (Witches) – bassoon, piano (12:00)
- Malambo – bassoon and piano (13:00)
- Miami Flute Suite – flute and piano (23:00)
- Pacific Serenade – clarinet and piano (optional saxophone) (16:00)
- Return – violin, piano (15:00)
- Salón Buenos Aires – flute, clarinet, violin, viola, cello, piano (23:00)
- Seducción – flute, clarinet, piano (9:00)
- Seducción Dance – flute, oboe, piano or flute, bassoon, piano (9:00)
- Seducción – violin, piano (7:00)
- Sextet – piano and wind quintet (8:00)
- Silence – violin and piano (10:00)
- Silence – clarinet and piano (10:00)
- Summer Song – oboe, piano (16:00)
- Sunset Song – bassoon, piano (18:00)
- Tango Trio – violin, cello, piano (12:00)
- Tango Trio – clarinet, cello, piano (optional: oboe, cello, piano) (12:00)
- Tango Trio – oboe, bassoon, piano (optional: clarinet, bassoon, piano) (12:00)

=== Orchestral ===
Orchestra

- Back in Time – orchestra (9:30)
- Caribbean Bacchanal – orchestra (13:00)
- Caribeña – orchestra (8:00)
- Caribeña – chamber orchestra (8:00)
- Chautauquan Summer – full orchestra (13:00)
- Salón Buenos Aires – orchestra (20:00)
- Conga – orchestra (12:00)
- Conga-Line in Hell – orchestra (11:00)
- The Fall of Cuzco – full orchestra (20:00)
- The Giant Guitar – full orchestra (7:00)
- Time and Again Barelas Overture – full orchestra (9:00)
- Time and Again Barelas Choral Suite – choir and orchestra (17:00)
- Time and Again Barelas Suite 2 – orchestra, choir, solo tenor (33:00)
- Toccata – orchestra (8:00)

Voice or solo instrument with orchestra

- Broken Rondo – English horn and orchestra (13:00)
- Clarinet Concerto – clarinet and orchestra (25:00)
- Concierto En Tango – cello and orchestra (18:00)
- Concierto En Tango – viola and orchestra (18:00)
- Concierto En Tango – string quartet and orchestra (18:00)
- It Is So Cold Tonight – high voice and orchestra (9:00)
- Islamorada – piano and string orchestra (9:00)
- Hexen – bassoon and string orchestra (12:00)
- Piano Concerto – piano and orchestra (25:00)
- Return To Homeland – violin and orchestra (15:00)
- Time And Again Barelas Choral Suite – choir and orchestra (17:00)
- Time And Again Barelas Suite No. 2 – choir, solo tenor, orchestra (33:00)
- Violin Concerto –violin and orchestra (27:00)

=== Choral and vocal ===
- Agnus Dei – med-high voice and piano (7:00)
- Albuquerque – barbershop quartet (3:00)
- Ave Maria – treble chorus and piano (with optional harp) (5:00)
- Composer Missing – chamber opera for choir and soli (90:00)
- Cuauhtemoc – opera for orchestra, choir, soli (3 hrs.)
- Cuauhtemoc Choral Suite – choir, 3 soli, piano, percussion (35:00)
- Cuauhtemoc Songs – vocal soli and piano (50:00)
- From Darkness To Light – choir, wind quartet, harp (8:00)
- It Is So Cold Tonight – high or medium voice with piano and optional orchestra
- Lacrymosa – medium high voice, piano (7:00)
- Ophelia In Seville – soprano, tenor, chamber instrumental ensemble (16:00)
- Salva Me – choir a cappella (opt. piano) (7:00)
- Time And Again Barelas – Opera in two acts: chorus, vocal soloists, orchestra (150:00)
- Time And Again Barelas Choral Suite (17:00)
- Time And Again Barelas Choral Suite No. 2 – chorus, orchestra, solo tenor (29:00)
- Troubadours – mixed choir with optional piano (10:00)

=== Piano and solo instrument ===
- Conga - piano (10:00)
- Four Hand Etude – piano 4-hands (4:00)
- Half of Me – piano left hand only (8:00)
- Music in a Bottle – piano (10:00)
- Nocturne - piano (8:00)
- Piano Sonata A No.2 - piano (15:00)
- Toccata – piano (5:00)
- Vals Brutal - piano (5:00)
- Tennessee – guitar (11:30)
- Cutting Limes – violin (4:00)

Harpsichord and organ

- Bells with a Mission – solo organ (15:00)
- One of You – solo organ (14:00)
- Pictures from America – harpsichord (13:00)
- Toccata – harpsichord (3:30)

=== Dance, film, and TV ===
- A Conga-Line in Hell – Choreography by Annabella Gonzalez for Annabella Gonzalez Dance Theater (New York)
- Convergence (Silence/Seducción) – Choreography by Brett Weidlich for Dance ART Ensemble/Ventura County Ballet – Focus on the Masters, Ventura, California
- Dansaq – (Presto II) – Choreography by Mari Fujibayashi and Olivia Rosenkrantz for Tapage Dance Ensemble (New York)
- Infinitos Traçados (Charango Capriccioso) – Choreography by Esdras Hernández Villar for São Paulo Dance Company
- Time and Again Barelas Dances – Choreography by David Vega Chavez for New Mexico Ballet Dancers and New Mexico Symphony Orchestra (Albuquerque)
- Clocks – Choreography by Minou Lallemand for Onium Ballet Project and Chamber Music Hawaii (Honolulu)
- Capadocia (Third Season) – HBO Latin America/Argos Productions
- Naturaleza Quieta – a documentary series produced by TV UNAM, Mexico

Chamber arrangements

- L'Enfant Et Les Sortileges (Ravel)
- Lieutenant Kije for 2 pianos 4-hands (Prokofiev)
- Rise and Fall of The City of Mahagonny (Weill)

== Recordings ==
- CD Miguel del Aguila Orchestral Works Albany Augusta Symphony/Dirk Meyer/Guillermo Figueroa Works: Violin Concerto, The Fall of Cuzco, Tensando, The Giant Guitar, Salon Buenos Aires
- CD Barroqueada Extreme Tango Productions CD Eroica Trio Work: Barroqueada for piano trio (violin, cello and piano)
- CD Journeys- Norwegian Radio Orchestra Naxos Norwegian Radio Orchestra/Miguel Hearth-Bedoya work: The Gian Guitar
- CD All Worlds, All Times Bright Shiny Things CD Windsync Quintet Word: Wind Quinteto No.2
- CD Canto del Paraiso Clarinete MEstizo CD Javier Vinasco/Carlos Betancur works: Milonga – for clarinet and piano, Pacific Serenade – for clarinet and piano
- CD Luces Ausentes CD Benjamin Harris Plays Miguel del Aguila works: Malambo - for flute bass and piano, Silence - for bass and piano, Tensando - for violin bass and piano, Presto a Dos – for cello and bass, Luces Ausentes - for flute, violin and bass, Cutting Limes - for solo violin, Invisibles - for solo piano
- CD Tierras Juntas Aria Classics Cuarteto Latinoamericano/Entrequatre work: Presto a 8
- CD Salón Buenos Aires Bridge Records CD 9302 Camerata San Antonio 2010 Grammy nominated for best Classical Album, and best Contemporary Classical Composition Works: Charango Capriccioso – for piano and string quartet Presto II – for string quartet Salon Buenos Aires – for chamber ensemble Life is a Dream – for string quartet Clocks – for piano and string quartet
- CD Built for Buffalo Beau Fleuve / BPO Label Buffalo Philharmonic Orchestra Roman Mekinulov, cello JoAnn Falletta, conductor 2015 Grammy nominated for Best Contemporary Classical Composition Work: Concierto en Tango for solo cello and orchestra
- CD Havana Moon Steinway & Sons Catalogue #: STNS30052 TransAtlantic Ensemble Mariam Adam, clarinet Evelyn Ulex, piano Works: Silence – for clarinet and piano Tango Trio – for violin, clarinet and piano Nocturne – for solo piano
- CD Orion Nocturne Albany Records ASIN: B07FCQRFZ8 Carlos Miguel Prieto, Conductor Louisiana Philharmonic Orchestra Johanna Cox Pennington, English Horn Work: Broken Rondo (Rondó Roto) Concerto for English horn and orchestra
- Del Caribe Soy Naxos (CD 8579016) Nestor Torres, flute Miguel del Aguila, piano Work: Miami Flute Suite – for flute and piano
- CD Garden of Joys and Sorrows Bridge Records (CD 9472) Hat Trick Ensemble Work: Submerged – for flute, viola and harp
- CD Th. Berger - Miguel del Aguila Albany Records CD: TROY066 American Music Ensemble Vienna Wenzel Fuchs, clarinet Hobart Earle, conductor Judith Farmer, bassoon Works: Clarinet Concerto – for clarinet and orchestra Herbsttag – for flute, bassoon and harp Hexen – for bassoon and string orchestra
- CD Summer Song Profil DDD – CD: 8977712 Katsuya Watanabe / David Johnson Works: Summer Song – for oboe and piano
- CD Clocks Hoot/Wisdom Recordings, FAU Piano Quintets of the Americas Cuarteto Latinoamericano / H. Coltman Works: Charango Capriccioso Clocks – for piano and string quartet 2010 Grammy nominated for best Contemporary Classical Composition
- CD Serenata Latina Elias Duo CD: 700261477145 Released 2019 Elias Duo Carlos Elias, violin Andrea Arese-Elias, piano Works: Silence – for violin and piano
- CD Silence Miguel del Aguila/CDBaby CD: 195079615979 Javier Vinasco, clarinet Miguel del Aguila, piano Works: Silence – for clarinet and piano Pacific Serenade – for clarinet and piano Islamorada – for piano Milonga – for clarinet and piano Seducción – for clarinet and piano Estudio Rítmico – for clarinet solo Malambo – for clarinet and piano
- CD Miguel del Aguila Piano Works Miguel del Aguila/CDBaby: Miguel del Aguila, piano Works: Conga – for piano Nocturne – for piano Toccata – for piano Music in a Bottle – for piano Piano Sonata No.2 – for piano Islamorada – for piano Vals Brutal – for piano
- CD Carte Postale Naxos/Atma Classique ACD2 2502 Quatour Alcan Works: Presto II – for string quartet
- CD De Europa a las Américas EAFIT University Recording, Colombia Trio Acuarimántima Work: Disagree! – for clarinet viola and piano
- CD Latinoamericana Modica Music The Annex Quartet Work: Presto II – for string quartet
- CD Piano Dance Telarc CD: 80549 Gloria Cheng, piano Works: Conga – for solo piano
- CD Discoveries 20th Century Music for Wind Quintet Helicon Records HE1030 Borealis Wind Quintet Works: Wind Quintet No.2
- CD Refuge Albany Records (Troy CD 1484) The Divan Consort Work: Seducción – for flute clarinet and piano
- CD Conga-Line in Hell Dorian CD: DOR93230 Camerata de las Americas Joel Sachs cond. / Duane Cochran piano Works: Conga-Line in Hell – for chamber ensemble
- CD Crossing America Eroica Classical Recordings CD JDT 3469 TransAtlantic Ensemble Mariam Adams, clarinet / Evelyn Ulex, piano Works: Pacific Serenade – for Clarinet and Piano
- CD Eco de Violin IUMusic-LAMC Recording Colin Sorgi, violin / Jooeun Pak, piano Works: Seducción – for violin and piano
- CD 4+1 Contemporary Music for String Quartet Universidad EAFIT Recordings Javier Asdrúbal Vinasco, clarinet Cuarteto Q-Arte Works: Pacific Serenade – for clarinet and string quartet
- CD Nostalgica Centaur Records CD: CRC2564 Barrick Stees bassoon / Randall Fusco, piano The Arianna String Quartet Works: Nostalgica – for bassoon and string quartet Sunset Song – for bassoon and piano
- CD Latin Perspective Cubafilin Records Ltd. / state 51 (UK Santiago String Quartet Works: Presto II – for string quartet
- CD Border Crossings Pacific Serenades Recordings CD: 06132-3 Gary Gray, clarinet / Pacific Serenade Ensemble Works: Pacific Serenade – for clarinet and string quartet
- CD Conga-Line in Hell Redwood Recordings Redwood Symphony Orchestra Eric Kujawsky, cond. Works: Conga – for orchestra
- CD Seducción Albany Records (Troy CD 1727) Stephanie Jutt, flute Orlando Pimentel, Clarinet Elena Abend, piano Works: Seducción – for flute, clarinet and piano
- CD Latin American Piano Trios Bridge Records CD 9302 Centaur Records CRC3336 Arcos Trio Work: Tango Trio – for violin, cello and piano
- CD Arpassión Suisa/TrioCorda Recording TrioCorda Harp Trio Zurich Works Sumergida – for three harps
- CD Oboe on the Road Centaur Records CRC2451 Mark Weiger oboe / Robert Conway piano (older first version) Works: Summersong – for oboe and piano
- CD Esprits Nomades White Records CD: USHM81880319 – ASIN B07H3F5XJ9 Released 2018 Trio Manestri Work: Seducción – for violin, flute and piano
- CD 20th Century Dances Scotwood Music – USA James Miltenberger, piano Works: Music in a Bottle – for solo piano Conga – for solo piano
- CD Exchange Latin America New World Records CRI CD: 848 Gary Gray, clarinet Pacific Serenade Ensemble Works: Pacific Serenade – for clarinet and string quartet
- CD Permanent Transitions Metro Records CD: MCD59601 Matthew Greif, guitar Works: Tennessee – for solo guitar
- CD Piano Music of the Americas ACA Digital Recordings CD: CM20021-21 James Miltenberger, piano Works: Piano Sonata No.2 – for solo piano
- CD Four for Tango New Albion NA100CD Cuarteto Latinoamericano Works: Presto II – for string quartet
- CD El Tiempo Global Entertainment Mexico GECDI4111 Onix Ensemble Alejandro Escuer conductor and Flute Mauricio Nader, piano Works: Clocks – for piano and string quartet 2010 Grammy nominated for best Contemporary Classical Composition
- CD From the Americas Rebeat Digital, Austria – Tango Malambo TransAtlantic Ensemble Mariam Adam, Clarinet / Evelyn Ulex, piano Works: Pacific Serenade – for clarinet and piano
- CD East Meets West Sony Austria/ORF LID19924 Odessa Philharmonic Orchestra Hobart Earle, cond. Works: Toccata – for orchestra
- CD Life is a Dream Madison String Quartet Recording Madison String Quartet Works: Life is a Dream – for string quartet Presto II – for string quartet
- CD KaleidosCoping Equilibrium Recordings CD IQ148 Michael Gordon, flute Celeste Johnson, oboe Sean Chen, piano Works: Seduction Dance – for flute, oboe and piano
- CD My Song in the Night Faye Dumont Singers Release Melbourne Women's Choir Works: Ave Maria – for chorus and piano
- CD Mi Chelada Urtext Digital Classics – Mexico Alvaro Bitran, cello Works: The Day After – for eight (or four) cellos
- CD Cello Innovations Centaur Records CD: 3623 Ashley Sandor Sidon /Erik Anderson Jesús Morales, cellos Works: Procesión de Locos – for four cellos
- CD Batata-Coco Conaculta – Mexico Camerata de las Americas Joel Sachs, conductor / Duane Cochran piano Works: Conga-Line in Hell – for chamber ensemble
- CD Arrivals and Departures Mark Records CD ASIN: B07G1WXT63 Lyrique Quintette Works Wind Quintet No.3
- CD Soaring Solo MSR Classics Stephanie Sant’Ambrogio, violin Works: Cutting Limes – for solo violin
- CD Marinka Brecelj Harpsichord KKM Vienna – Austria CD 3032-2 Marinka Brecelj, harpsichord Works: Toccata – for solo harpsichord Cuadros de America – for solo harpsichord
- CD Laberintos Australian National University ANCLAS Recording Duo Deconet Henry Avila, violin / Irma Enriquez, piano Works: Seducción – for violin and piano
