= Miguel Harth-Bedoya =

Peruvian conductor (born 1968)

Miguel Alberto Harth-Bedoya Gonzalez (born 1968) is a Peruvian conductor. He was formerly music director of the Fort Worth Symphony Orchestra from 2000 to 2020 and chief conductor of the Norwegian Radio Orchestra from 2013 to 2020. Starting the Fall of 2023, Harth-Bedoya became the Mary Franks Thompson Director of Orchestral Studies and music director of the Baylor University Symphony Orchestra.

On May 14, 2024, Harth-Bedoya was announced as distinguished resident director of orchestras and professor of conducting at the Rice University Shepherd School of Music. He began as designate in the 2024–25 school year and assumed full responsibilities overseeing the Shepherd School's orchestral programs in the 2025–26 season.

== Biography ==
=== Family and early life ===
Harth-Bedoya was born in Lima. His mother was a choral director for the airline Aeroperu. His sister Maria Luisa Harth-Bedoya is a guitarist.

Harth-Bedoya studied at the Curtis Institute in Philadelphia. He later attended the Juilliard School in New York, where his teachers included Otto-Werner Mueller. He graduated from Juilliard in 1991 with a Bachelor of Music degree and in 1993 with a Master of Music degree, both in conducting. His other conducting teachers have included Gustav Meier and Seiji Ozawa. In his native Peru, Harth-Bedoya helped to establish the Orquesta Filarmonica de Lima and the Compañía Contemporánea de Opera, and worked with both ensembles from 1993 to 1998.

=== Career ===
In the US in his early career, Harth-Bedoya worked with the Norwalk Youth Symphony (Connecticut), with which he made his Carnegie Hall conducting debut. He was music director of the New York Youth Symphony from 1993 to 1997. He also worked as a member of the Juilliard conducting faculty and was a staff conductor with the New York Philharmonic. In 1995, he conducted the Naumburg Orchestral Concerts, in the Naumburg Bandshell, Central Park, in the summer series.

In 1996, Harth-Bedoya became music director of the Eugene Symphony, and held this post until 2002. In 1998, he became assistant conductor of the Los Angeles Philharmonic, appointed by Esa-Pekka Salonen. Salonen subsequently promoted him to associate conductor in 1999, and Harth-Bedoya held this post through 2004. He won the Seaver/National Endowment for the Arts Conductors Award in 2002.

In his Hollywood Bowl debut on Aug. 20–21, 1999, Harth-Bedoya conducted the Los Angeles Philharmonic Orchestra in a program titled "Latin Spectacular". The KCOP-TV production of this concert, as part of its "Live from the Hollywood Bowl" series, won a Los Angeles Emmy Award in the "Live Special Events" category on Jun 19, 2000, at the 52nd Los Angeles Area Emmy Awards ceremony.

In 2000, Harth-Bedoya became music director of the Fort Worth Symphony Orchestra. He was named distinguished guest professor of conducting at Texas Christian University in March 2008. Following several extensions of his Fort Worth contract, in May 2018, the orchestra announced that Harth-Bedoya was to conclude his Fort Worth music directorship at the end of the 2019–2020 season, and subsequently to take the title of conductor laureate of the orchestra. In the US, Harth-Bedoya's work in contemporary music has included conducting the July 2005 premiere of the revised version of Golijov's Ainadamar at Santa Fe Opera, and the world premiere performances of Jennifer Higdon's first opera Cold Mountain, also at Santa Fe Opera, in August 2015.

Outside of the US, Harth-Bedoya was music director of the Auckland Philharmonia Orchestra from 2000 to 2005. In 2007, he established the multimedia Caminos del Inka project for promotion of music from South America, which has included orchestral works of several South American composers, such as Osvaldo Golijov, Enrique Iturriaga, Celso Garrido Lecca, Esteban Benzecry and Jimmy Lopez. Harth-Bedoya first guest-conducted the Norwegian Radio Orchestra (KORK) in November 2010. In February 2012, the KORK announced the appointment of Harth-Bedoya as its 7th principal conductor, effective with the 2013–2014 season. He concluded his chief conductorship of the Norwegian Radio Orchestra at the close of the 2019–2020 season.

== Personal life ==
Harth-Bedoya married his wife Maritza in 2000. The couple have three children. The family resides in Fort Worth, Texas.

== Selected recordings ==
- Edvard Grieg, Piano concerto in A minor op.16, Camille Saint-Saëns, piano concerto n°2 in G minor, Vadym Kholodenko, piano, The Norwegian Radio Orchestra, conducted by Miguel Harth-Bedoya. CD Harmonia Mundi 2016

Cultural offices
Preceded by Samuel Wong	Music Director, New York Youth Symphony; 1993-1997	Succeeded by Mischa Santora
Preceded by Marin Alsop	Music Director, Eugene Symphony; 1996-2002	Succeeded by Giancarlo Guerrero
Preceded by John Giordano	Music Director, Fort Worth Symphony Orchestra; 2000-2020	Succeeded by Robert Spano
Preceded by Thomas Søndergård	Chief Conductor, Norwegian Radio Orchestra; 2013-2020	Succeeded by Petr Popelka
