= Thomas Søndergård =

Danish conductor and percussionist (born 1969)

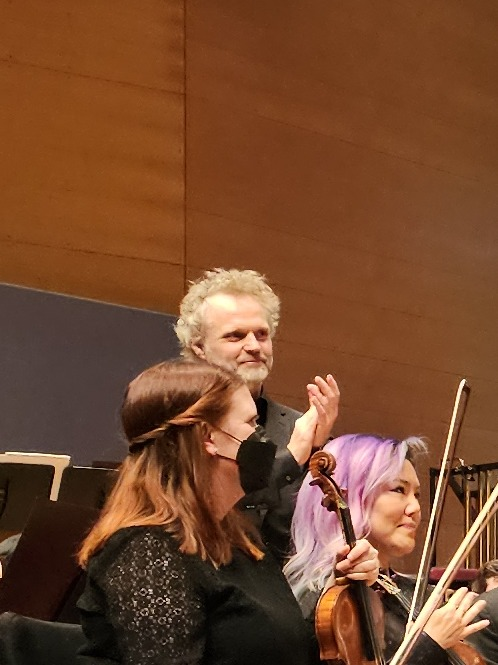
- Søndergård in 2026

Background information
- Born: Thomas Søndergård; 4 October 1969 (age 57); Holstebro, Denmark
- Genre: Classical
- Occupations: Conductor, percussionist
- Member of: Minnesota Orchestra Royal Scottish National Orchestra
- Formerly of: European Union Youth Orchestra Royal Danish Orchestra Norwegian Radio Orchestra BBC National Orchestra of Wales

Thomas Søndergård (born 4 October 1969) is a Danish conductor and percussionist.

== Biography ==
Søndergård studied percussion at the Royal Danish Academy of Music from 1989 to 1992, where his teachers included Gert Mortensen. In the same years, he was a member of the European Union Youth Orchestra. Søndergård joined the Royal Danish Orchestra as a percussionist in 1992. He served on the faculty of the Royal Danish Academy of Music from 2001 to 2002.

Søndergård devoted greater attention to conducting from age 27. After his debut at The Royal Danish Opera with the premiere of Poul Ruders's Kafka's Trial in 2005, he joined Askonas Holt management. In 2009, Søndergård became principal conductor of the Norwegian Radio Orchestra (KORK). He concluded his KORK tenure after the 2011–2012 season.

=== Career in the UK ===
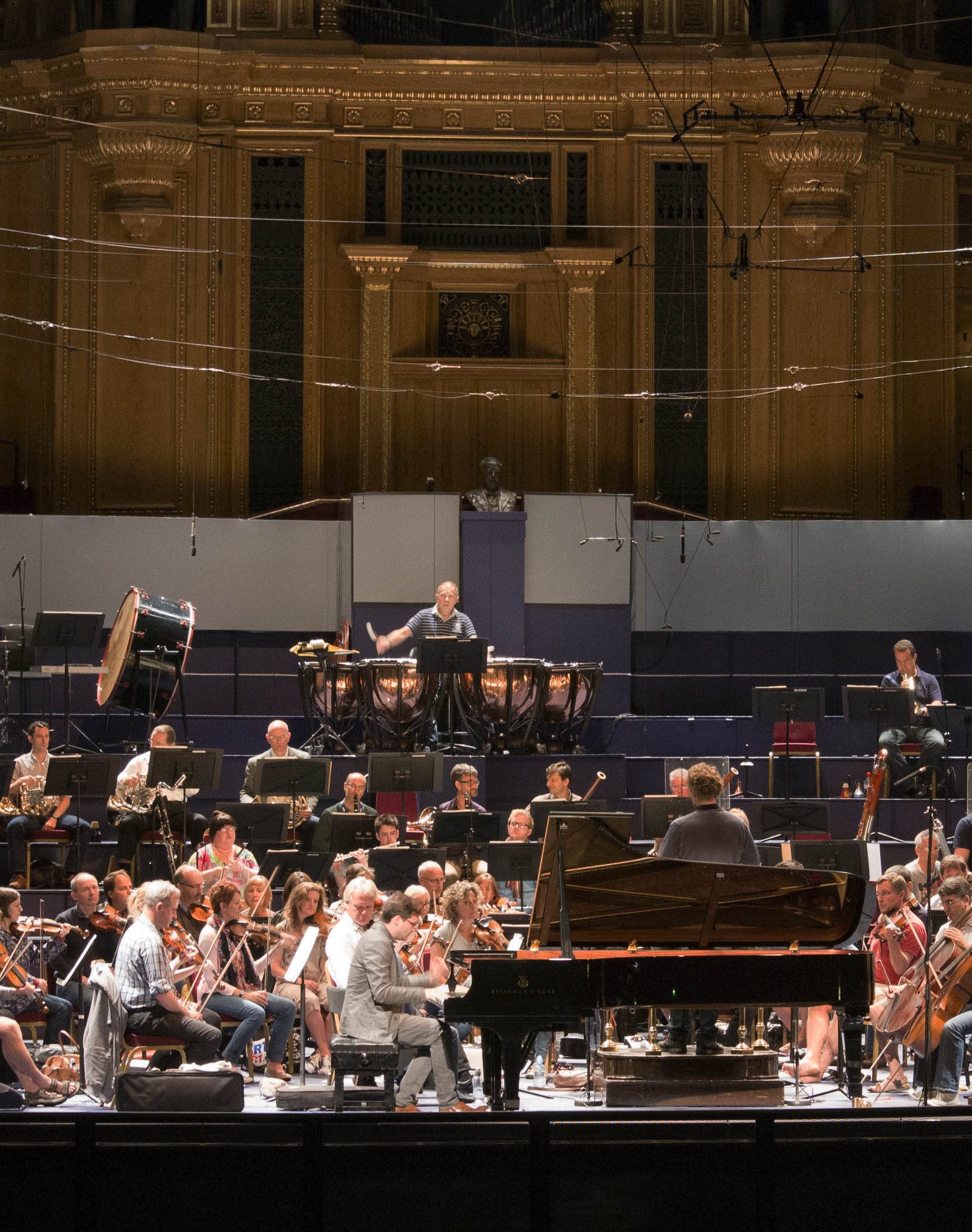
Francesco Piemontesi and Thomas Søndergård rehearsing with the BBC National Orchestra of Wales at Royal Albert Hall, London.

Søndergård first conducted the BBC National Orchestra of Wales (BBC NOW) in December 2009, as an emergency substitute for Thierry Fischer. In July 2011, Søndergård was named the 14th principal conductor of the BBC NOW, effective with the 2012–2013 season, for an initial contract of four years. In February 2016, the BBC NOW announced the further extension of his contract as principal conductor through "at least 2018". Søndergård formally concluded his tenure as principal conductor of the BBC NOW in July 2018.

Søndergård first guest-conducted the Royal Scottish National Orchestra (RSNO) in 2009, as an emergency substitute for Yakov Kreizberg. In October 2011, the RSNO named him its principal guest conductor, effective with the 2012–2013 season, with an initial contract of three years for three programmes per year. In May 2017, the RSNO announced Søndergård's appointment as its next principal conductor, effective with the 2018–2019 season. In February 2021, the RSNO announced the extension of Søndergård's contract as music director through autumn 2024. In April 2023, the RSNO announced a one-year extension of his contract as music director through the 2024–2025 season. Søndergård is schedule to concluded his tenure as RSNO music director at the close of the 2026–2027 season and subsequently to take the title of music director emeritus.

=== Minnesota Orchestra ===
In December 2021, Søndergård first guest-conducted the Minnesota Orchestra. He returned for another guest-conducting engagement in April 2022. In July 2022, the orchestra announced Søndergård's appointment as its music director, effective with the 2023–2024 season, with an initial contract of five seasons.

== Recordings ==
Søndergård has made several recordings for the Linn label and the DaCapo label, including music of Bent Lorentzen, Per Nørgård, and Poul Ruders.

== Personal life ==
In July 2022, Søndergård married his longtime partner, the Swedish baritone Andreas Landin.

Cultural offices
Preceded by Rolf Gupta	Principal Conductor, Norwegian Radio Orchestra; 2009–2012	Succeeded by Miguel Harth-Bedoya
Preceded by Thierry Fischer	Principal Conductor, BBC National Orchestra of Wales; 2012–2018	Succeeded by Ryan Bancroft
