= Leon Bates (pianist) =

American pianist (1949–2025)

- Born: November 3, 1949; Philadelphia, Pennsylvania, U.S.
- Died: November 21, 2025 (aged 76)
- Genre: Classical
- Occupation: Pianist
- Instruments: Piano; violin

Leon Bates (November 3, 1949 – November 21, 2025) was an American classical pianist.

== Background ==
Leon Bates was born in Philadelphia, where by the age of six he had excelled in the study of music, specifically at playing the piano and violin. As a young artist, Bates was an understudy of Irene Beck. He also was a student of Natalie Hinderas at the Esther Boyer College of Music at Temple University in Philadelphia.

While growing up, Leon Bates divided his time between two disparate passions: the pursuit of music and the physically demanding sport of body building. According to Karima A. Haynes, Leon Bates grew up defying stereotypes. Bates claims that the two disciplines have synergistic benefits. "The last piece on the program is the one that is the most demanding and dynamic. You don’t want to run out of energy as you are coming to the piece that demands the most from you. (Haynes qtd Bates 164)."

Bates died on November 21, 2025.

== Career ==
Bates toured the world, performing with many symphonies. In the United States, he has performed with both Philadelphia and Cleveland Orchestras, as well as New York and Los Angeles Philharmonics. He also performed with various symphonies such as Atlanta, Boston, Detroit and the San Francisco Symphonies. In Europe, he has performed with various orchestras including Vienna and Basel Symphonies, the Radio-Orchestra of Dublin, the Strasbourg Philharmonic, Orchestra Sinfonica dell’Accademia Nazionale di Santa Cecilia, the Czech National Symphony Orchestra, Malmö Symphony of Sweden and more. One of his most highly regarded performances was with Lorin Maazel at the Orchestra of France. This concert was in celebration of the 500,000th piano built at Carnegie Hall but was held at La Scala in Milan. He has also composed prominent pieces of music with the accompaniment of Janet Vogt for a method book entitled Piano Discoveries.
