= Lancaster Symphony Orchestra =

The Lancaster Symphony Orchestra (LSO) is a professional regional symphony orchestra based in Lancaster, Pennsylvania. Established in 1947, it has served the region for over 75 seasons, providing classical and contemporary performances, music education initiatives, and community outreach programs. The LSO is currently led by music director Michael Butterman.

== History ==
The Lancaster Symphony Orchestra was founded in 1947 by Louis Vyner, a violist and conductor trained at the Curtis Institute of Music. Vyner, who had worked with Leopold Stokowski and Arthur Rodzinski, conducted the LSO's inaugural performance on May 1, 1947, at J.P. McCaskey High School. The orchestra was initially composed of local musicians, including teachers, professionals from various fields, and talented amateur players.

Efforts to establish an orchestra in Lancaster had been made as early as the early 20th century, with multiple attempts in 1912, the 1920s, and the 1930s, including efforts led by local musician Puzant Barsumian. However, financial constraints and a limited pool of trained musicians prevented long-term success. It was only after World War II that the combination of available talent, community interest, and resources allowed for the creation of a sustainable symphony orchestra.

Vyner's tenure emphasized artistic development and youth engagement. He incorporated musicians from the Philadelphia Orchestra into performances and encouraged young musicians, including Paul Belser, a local dentist and musician who performed with the LSO for over five decades. Vyner also conducted for other Pennsylvania orchestras, including the Reading Symphony Orchestra, and worked with young artists such as pianist André Watts, who made his debut with the LSO at age of ten in 1957.

== Growth and expansion ==
Upon Vyner's retirement in 1979, Stephen Gunzenhauser was appointed as the LSO's second music director, serving for 40 seasons. Gunzenhauser introduced higher professional standards, recruited musicians from the Delaware Symphony Orchestra (where he was also music director), and expanded the orchestra's repertoire to include works by American composers and contemporary artists. During this period, the Lancaster Symphony Chorus was also developed under Dorothy Rose Smith in 1974. Today, the chorus continues under the direction of Dr. William Wright.

The LSO moved from McCaskey High School to the Fulton Opera House in 1965, where it performed for more than 50 years. The venue change improved both acoustics and community engagement, though audience capacity was reduced. After the COVID-19 pandemic, the orchestra relocated to the Gardner Theater at Lancaster Country Day School, where it continues to perform today.

In 2020, a new board of directors and administrative staff took over, with several musicians serving in leadership roles, including Sara Male (associate principal cellist, board chair) and Guy McIntosh (executive director, trumpet section member).

== Music directors ==
- Louis Vyner (1947–1979)
- Stephen Gunzenhauser (1979–2019)
- Michael Butterman (2021–present)

== Notable Programs and Initiatives ==
=== Composer's Awards (1959-2020) ===
Established by Kenneth Bates, the LSO's Composer’s Award was the longest-running composer's prize issued by an American orchestra, spanning 61 years. The award recognized notable composers such as:

- Howard Hanson (1959)
- Gian Carlo Menotti
- Vincent Persichetti
- Virgil Thomson
- Gunther Schuller
- Alan Hovhaness
- Ned Rorem

In total, over 60 American composers received the award before its conclusion in 2020.

=== Women's Symphony Association ===
Founded by Maude Bates, this organization has played a key role in supporting young musicians by funding concerto competitions, scholarships, and educational initiatives.

=== Education & Outreach Programs ===
The Lancaster Symphony Orchestra reaches more than 21,000 individuals annually through various education and outreach programs designed to foster music appreciation and accessibility.

- Educational Concert Series – Free concerts designed specifically for grades 3–8.
- StandPartners Program – LSO musicians mentor local school students.
- Instrument Test Drive – Hands-on introduction to musical instruments for third-grade students.
- Gift of Music – Provides over 200 musical instruments to students in the School District of Lancaster.
- Play it Forward – Supplies musical accessories for public school music programs.
- Library Symphony Passes – Free concert tickets available at Lancaster County public libraries.
- Open Rehearsals – Free access for the public to observe professional rehearsals.
- LSO Neighborhood Series – Free concerts in local communities.
- Rising Stars Concerto Competition (for students in grades 8–12, in partnership with the Women's Symphony Association).

== Present day and future vision ==
Under the leadership of Michael Butterman, the LSO has embraced innovative programming and audience development. The orchestra balances traditional repertoire with contemporary works, aiming to attract new audiences while maintaining its longstanding patrons. Butterman also serves as music director of the Boulder Philharmonic, Shreveport Symphony, and Williamsburg Symphony Orchestra.

The LSO continues to expand its free community concerts, collaborate with local arts organizations, and maintain its commitment to music education. Through these efforts, the orchestra remains a cultural pillar in Lancaster, Pennsylvania, promoting accessible and high-quality orchestral music.

== Sources ==
- Lancaster Symphony Board of Directors Minutes
- Lancaster Symphony Orchestra programs and program notes
- lancastersymphony.org
- Journal of the Lancaster County Historical Society Vol.103, No. 1
- Intelligencer Journal June 14, 1996
