= Petr Popelka =

Czech conductor and composer (born 1986)

Petr Popelka (born 1986) is a Czech conductor and composer.

== Biography ==
Popelka was born in Prague, Czechoslovakia. He studied music and played the double bass at the Prague Conservatory. He continued his studies at the Hochschule für Musik Freiburg, where his teachers included Božo Paradžik. At age 19, Popelka became a member of the Prague Radio Symphony Orchestra, and in 2009 joined the academy of the Bavarian Radio Symphony Orchestra. From 2010 to 2019, Popelka was deputy principal double bassist of the Sächsische Staatskapelle Dresden. Popelka was composer-in-residence at the PODIUM chamber music festival in Mödling, Austria, in 2015.

During his orchestral tenure in Dresden, Popelka developed an increased interest in conducting. His conducting mentors have included Vladimir Kiradjiev, Péter Eötvös, Alan Gilbert, Jaap van Zweden and Johannes Schlaefli. He was a recipient of the Neeme Järvi Prize in 2017. In the 2019–2020 season, he was the first conducting fellow at the NDR Elbphilharmonie Orchestra. From 2020 to 2023, Popelka was chief conductor of the Norwegian Radio Orchestra, his first chief conductorship. He has served as principal guest conductor of the Janáček Philharmonic Orchestra in Ostrava, Czech Republic.

Popelka became chief conductor and artistic director of the Prague Radio Symphony Orchestra as of the 2022–2023 season. Popelka is scheduled to conclude his tenure with the Prague Radio Symphony Orchestra at the close of the 2025–2026 season.

Popelka first guest-conducted the Vienna Symphony in May 2022. In June 2023, the Vienna Symphony announced the appointment of Popelka as its next chief conductor, effective with the 2024–2025 season, with an initial contract of five seasons. In 2025, Popelka first guest-conducted at the Bavarian State Opera in a production of Káťa Kabanová. In June 2026, the Bavarian Ministry of Science, Research and Art announced the appointment of Popelka as its next Generalmusikdirektor (GMD), effective with the 2029–2030 season, with an initial contract of five years. This appointment also encompasses the post of chief conductor of the Bavarian State Orchestra, with this appointment scheduled to take effect in parallel in the 2029–2030 season, with the same initial contract of five years.

== Selected compositions ==
- Labyrinth des Herzens (2015)
- Szenen für Klavierquartett (2015)

Cultural offices
Preceded by Miguel Harth-Bedoya	Principal Conductor, Norwegian Radio Orchestra; 2020–2023	Succeeded by Holly Hyun Choe
Preceded by Alexander Liebreich	Chief Conductor, Prague Radio Symphony Orchestra; 2022–present	Succeeded by incumbent
