= Holly Hyun Choe =

Korean-American conductor (born 1991)

Holly Hyun Choe (born 1991) is a Korean-American conductor.

== Biography ==
Born in Seoul, South Korea, Choe grew up in the Los Angeles area. Choe began to teach herself the clarinet at age 13, and began formal music lessons at age 19. Choe studied music at the Bob Cole Conservatory of Music at California State University, Long Beach. She continued her music studies at the New England Conservatory of Music, where her teachers included Charles Peltz, and earned a Master of Music degree in 2017.

Choe was a conducting fellow with the Dirigentenforum (Conductors Forum) of the German Music Council in 2018. She was an award recipient of the Marin Alsop Taki Concordia Conducting Fellowship in 2019, and a fellow of the Péter Eötvös Foundation Mentoring Program in 2020. She further studied conducting at the Zurich University of the Arts, where her teachers included Johannes Schlaefli. She has served as conductor of the Orchesterverein Wiedikon, from 2018 to 2022, and the University of St. Gallen Alumni Symphony Orchester in Switzerland.

Choe was an assistant conductor with the Tonhalle-Orchester Zürich from 2020 to 2022. From 2022 to 2025, Choe was principal conductor of ensemble reflector, in Germany. Choe and ensemble reflector have recorded commercially for the Solaire label. She was a Dudamel Fellow with the Los Angeles Philharmonic for the 2024–2025 season.

In June 2024, Choe first guest-conducted the Orchestre national de Cannes. In November 2024, Choe first guest-conducted the Norwegian Radio Orchestra (KORK). In March 2025, KORK announced the appointment of Choe as its next principal conductor, effective January 2026, with an initial contract of three seasons. Choe is the first female conductor to be named principal conductor of the Norwegian Radio Orchestra.

In April 2025, the Solti Foundation US announced Choe as the 2025 Recipient of the Sir Georg Solti Conducting Award. In July 2025, the Orchestre national de Cannes announced the appointment of Choe as its next music director, the first female conductor named to the post, effective with the 2026–2027 season, with an initial contract of four seasons.

Choe resides in Germany.

Cultural offices
Preceded by Jonas Ehrler	Conductor / Music Director, Orchesterverein Wiedikon; 2018–2022	Succeeded by Francesco Cagnasso
Preceded by Petr Popelka	Chief Conductor, Norwegian Radio Orchestra; 2026–present	Succeeded by incumbent
