= Allison Loggins-Hull =

American composer and flutist

Allison Loggins-Hull is an American composer and flutist known for her work with the Cleveland Orchestra, Lizzo, Frank Ocean, Hans Zimmer, and as one half of the flute duo Flutronix.

Loggins-Hull was named the Daniel R. Lewis Composition Fellow of the Cleveland Orchestra, a three-season residency, in 2022. The Cleveland Orchestra released an album of her music in 2026, titled Allison Loggins-Hull: The Cleveland Residency, the orchestra's first portrait album of work by a living composer. A second album of her chamber works, Patchwork, was released in 2026 as well, performed by Cleveland Orchestra Musicians alongside Loggins-Hull.

She is the New Jersey Symphony's Resident Artistic Partner. She was named 2026 Susan D. Boyd Composer-in-Residence at the Spoleto Festival USA.

Her work has been commissioned and performed by institutions including The Knights, the Cincinnati Symphony Orchestra, The Seattle Symphony, The Boston Symphony Orchestra, The National Orchestral Institute, Chicago Symphony Orchestra, Toronto Symphony Orchestra, Roomful of Teeth, and Third Coast Percussion.

Loggins-Hull wrote the original score for "Maurice Hines: Bring Them Back", a documentary about Maurice Hines, in which he tells the stories of legendary performers of the Apollo Theater in New York.

She was invited to the flute vault of the Library of Congress alongside her Flutronix duo partner, Nathalie Joachim, to play the Dayton C. Miller collection of flutes. She received a commission from the Library of Congress in 2020 as part of The Boccaccio Project to write a piece for singing flutist for Flutronix.

Loggins-Hull cites an album by Hubert Laws as the origin of her interest in the flute as a child.

== Discography ==
- 2026 Allison Loggins Hull: Patchwork (Cleveland Soloists / Allison Loggins-Hull / Laquita Mitchell) (Composer, Conductor, Flute, Primary Artist, Liner Notes)
- 2026 Allison Loggins Hull: Legacy; Can You See?; Grit. Grace. Glory. (Franz Welser-Möst / Cleveland Orchestra) (Composer)
- 2024 Persist (Ethel / Allison Loggins-Hull) (Primary Artist, Composer, Flute)
- 2022 Through Broken Time (Jennifer Grim) (Composer)
- 2022 Perspectives (Third Coast Percussion) (Composer, credited as Flutronix)
- 2021 Count to Five (Recap) (Composer)
- 2020 Forward Music Project 1.0 (Amanda Gookin) (Liner Notes, Composer)
- 2019 The Lion King [2019] [Original Motion Picture Soundtrack] (Flute)
- 2017 Gnosis (David Virelles) (Flute)
- Where You Been? (Taverna Miller) (Flute)
- 2014 2.0 (Flutronix) (Composer, Primary Artist)
- 2010 Flutronix (Composer, Primary Artist)
