= Vienna Symphony =

Austrian orchestra

- Orchestra
- Former name: Wiener Concertverein, Tonkünstler Orchestra
- Founded: 1900
- Concert hall: Wiener Konzerthaus
- Principal conductor: Petr Popelka
- Website: www.wienersymphoniker.at

The Vienna Symphony (Vienna Symphony Orchestra, German: Wiener Symphoniker) is an Austrian orchestra based in Vienna. It performs at both the Wiener Konzerthaus and the Musikverein Wien, and regularly serves as the opera orchestra at the Theater an der Wien.

== History ==
In 1900, Ferdinand Löwe founded the orchestra as the Wiener Concertverein (Vienna Concert Society). The orchestra was established to create a permanent symphony orchestra in Vienna that would make symphonic music accessible to wider audiences, and it gave its official debut on 30 October 1900 in the Great Hall of the Musikverein under Löwe's direction. In its first season, 1900–1901, the orchestra became the first Viennese orchestra to perform all of Beethoven's symphonies in a cycle.

The orchestra was founded during the period of Viennese modernism and became associated with both the classical-romantic repertoire and new music. In its first decades, it gave premieres or early performances of works that later entered the standard repertoire, including Anton Bruckner's Ninth Symphony, Arnold Schoenberg's Pelleas und Melisande and Gurre-Lieder, Maurice Ravel's Piano Concerto for the Left Hand, Alexander von Zemlinsky's Die Seejungfrau, and Franz Schmidt's Das Buch mit sieben Siegeln.

In 1913 the orchestra moved into the Vienna Konzerthaus. In 1919 it merged with the Tonkünstler Orchestra, and in 1933 it acquired its current name. Despite a decline in concert attendance after the introduction of radio during the 1920s, the orchestra survived until the German annexation of Austria in 1938, after which it was incorporated into the German cultural system. During the Nazi period it was used for propaganda purposes and, depleted by assignments of musicians to wartime work, ceased activity on 1 September 1944.

The orchestra's first post-war concert took place on 16 September 1945, with Gustav Mahler's Symphony No. 3. Under the direction of Josef Krips, the orchestra rebuilt its repertoire after the years of isolation. In 1946 it appeared for the first time at the Bregenz Festival, where it later became orchestra in residence.

The post-war period also marked the beginning of the orchestra's association with Herbert von Karajan. Although Karajan did not hold the title of principal conductor, he worked regularly with the orchestra in the "Karajan Series" concerts and led it on tours in Europe and North America. During the 1950s the orchestra made recordings with conductors including Hermann Scherchen and F. Charles Adler, including early recordings of Mahler symphonies. In 1959, the orchestra performed for Pope John XXIII at Vatican City, leading up to the debut of Wolfgang Sawallisch.

Sawallisch's tenure included a United States tour in 1964 and a combined United States and Japan tour in 1967. It also included the reopening of the Theater an der Wien in 1962. Krips returned as artistic adviser in the period between Sawallisch's departure and the arrival of Carlo Maria Giulini as principal conductor. In 1986, Georges Prêtre became principal guest conductor and served until the arrival of Rafael Frühbeck de Burgos as principal conductor in 1991.

Vladimir Fedoseyev became chief conductor in 1997 and served until 2005. Prêtre and Sawallisch each held the title of Ehrendirigent (honorary conductor) of the orchestra until their deaths. Fabio Luisi was principal conductor from 2005 to 2013.

In October 2011, Philippe Jordan was named the orchestra's next chief conductor, effective with the 2014–2015 season, with an initial contract of five years. In December 2016, the orchestra announced the extension of Jordan's contract as chief conductor through the 2020–2021 season. The orchestra recorded a Beethoven symphony cycle with Jordan. Jordan concluded his tenure as chief conductor at the close of the 2020–2021 season.

Andrés Orozco-Estrada first guest-conducted the orchestra in 2006. In March 2018, the orchestra announced his appointment as its next chief conductor, effective with the 2021–2022 season, with an initial contract of five years. He took the title of chief conductor designate for the 2020–2021 season. Following reports that the orchestra had planned not to extend his initial contract and conflicts with upper-level management, Orozco-Estrada resigned as chief conductor on 12 April 2022, with immediate effect.

Marie Jacquot first guest-conducted the orchestra in 2020. In March 2023, the orchestra announced the appointment of Jacquot as its next principal guest conductor (Erste Gastdirigentin), the first female conductor to be named to the post, effective with the 2023–2024 season. In June 2023, the orchestra announced the appointment of Petr Popelka as its next chief conductor, effective with the 2024–2025 season, with an initial contract of five seasons.

== Recordings ==
The Vienna Symphony has made commercial and archival recordings for labels including Orfeo, Deutsche Grammophon, Sony Classical and the orchestra's own Wiener Symphoniker label. Its recorded legacy includes historical concert documents, symphonic cycles, opera and vocal repertory, and crossover concert releases with internationally known soloists.

Among the orchestra's historical recordings are performances conducted by Herbert von Karajan, George Szell, Hermann Scherchen and Volkmar Andreae, issued by Orfeo in the anthology Vienna Symphony Jubilee 1900–1990. Orfeo has also issued Scherchen's recording of Mahler's Seventh Symphony with the orchestra, and Karajan's recordings with the orchestra of Handel's Concerto grosso Op. 6 No. 12 and Tchaikovsky's Fourth Symphony.

The orchestra has also recorded with prominent instrumental soloists. A Deutsche Grammophon recording of Bach violin concertos includes David Oistrakh with the Wiener Symphoniker. A live recording of Tchaikovsky's Violin Concerto with Anne-Sophie Mutter, Karajan and the Vienna Symphony has also circulated in catalogue listings.

In vocal and crossover repertory, the orchestra appeared with José Carreras, Plácido Domingo and Luciano Pavarotti on The Three Tenors Christmas, recorded live at the Vienna Konzerthaus in 1999 under Steven Mercurio. The orchestra also appeared with Domingo and the Vienna Boys' Choir on recordings conducted by Helmuth Froschauer, and with Domingo, Tony Bennett, Charlotte Church and Vanessa Williams on Christmas in Vienna VII. Another Christmas in Vienna recording features the Wiener Symphoniker with Elīna Garanča, Juan Diego Flórez, Genia Kühmeier and Paul Armin Edelmann, conducted by Karel Mark Chichon.

Under Philippe Jordan, the orchestra recorded its first complete Beethoven symphony cycle for its own Wiener Symphoniker label. The first release in the cycle, Beethoven's First and Third symphonies, was named an Editor's Choice by Gramophone in January 2018, and the release of the Fourth and Fifth symphonies received the same distinction in June 2018. The cycle was also reviewed in The Guardian, which noted that it marked the start of the orchestra's first Beethoven cycle on CD.

== Recent tours ==
The Vienna Symphony maintains an active touring schedule in Austria and abroad. In its 2023–2024 season the orchestra announced 156 concerts in nine countries, including 30 concerts on tour. In September 2022 the orchestra made its first appearance in Bulgaria, giving two concerts at the Ancient Theatre in Plovdiv under Nayden Todorov, with Mario Hossen as violin soloist. Recent tours have included also an Austria tour in January 2023, with concerts in Graz, Salzburg and Bregenz, followed by a guest performance in Baden-Baden with pianist Jan Lisiecki; a Germany tour in February and March 2023 under Jaap van Zweden with pianist Beatrice Rana; and a 2024 Asian tour under Omer Meir Wellber, with concerts in Japan and South Korea and appearances by pianist Hisako Kawamura and violinist Bomsori Kim. During the orchestra's 2024–2025 anniversary season, Petr Popelka led tour concerts including Prague, Dresden, Baden-Baden, Budapest, Munich and Freiburg, with soloists such as Jan Bartoš, Renaud Capuçon, Jan Lisiecki, Anna Vinnitskaya and Alexander Malofeev.

== Chief conductors ==
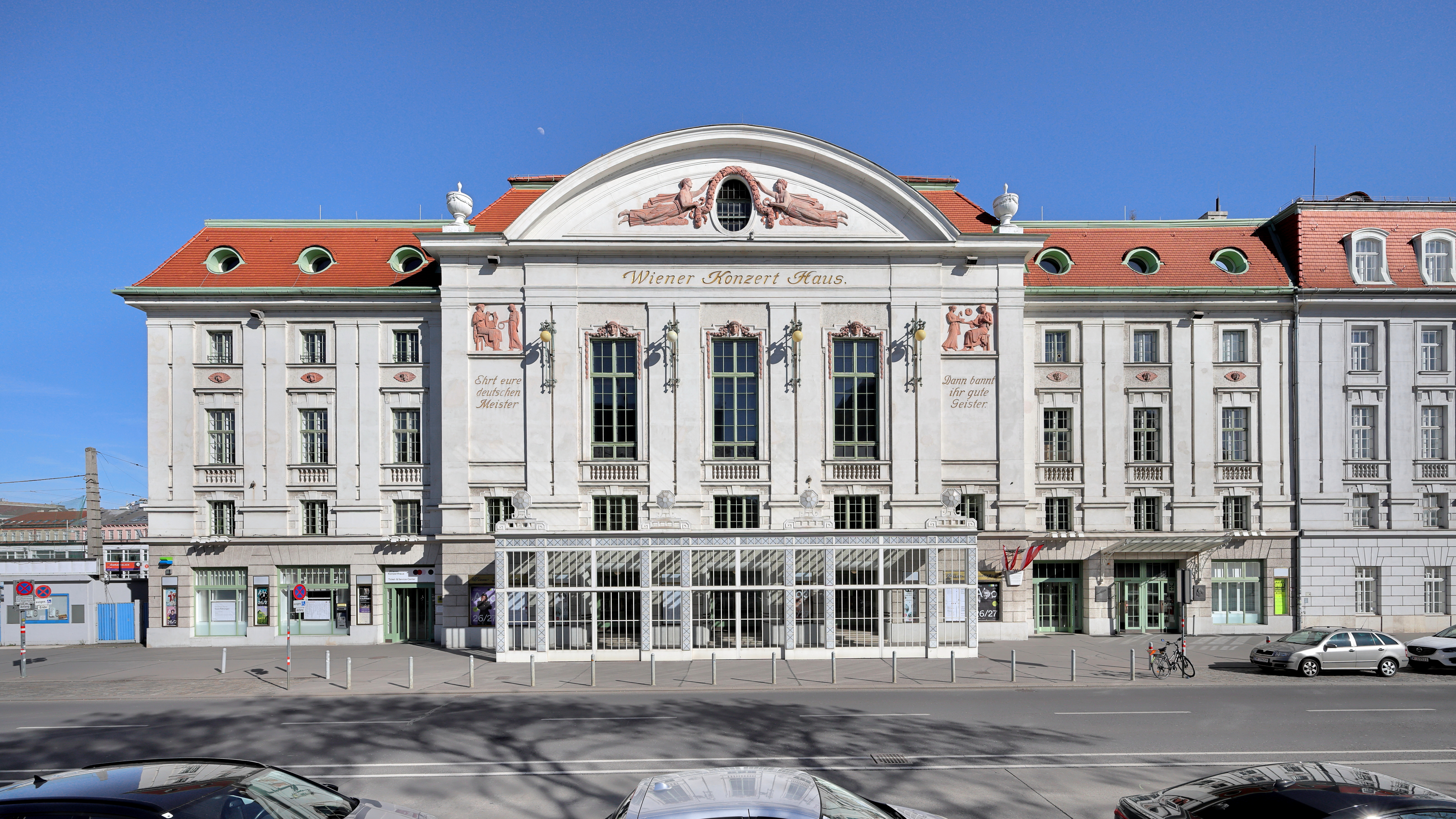
Wiener Konzerthaus

- Ferdinand Löwe (1900–1925)
- Hugo Gottesmann (1929–1933)
- Oswald Kabasta (1934–1938)
- Hans Weisbach (1939–1944)
- Hans Swarowsky (1945–1947)
- Wolfgang Sawallisch (1960–1970)
- Carlo Maria Giulini (1973–1976)
- Gennady Rozhdestvensky (1980–1982)
- Rafael Frühbeck de Burgos (1991–1996)
- Vladimir Fedoseyev (1997–2005)
- Fabio Luisi (2005–2013)
- Philippe Jordan (2014–2021)
- Andrés Orozco-Estrada (2021–2022)
- Petr Popelka (2024–present)

=== Conductors laureate ===
- Georges Prêtre
- Wolfgang Sawallisch

=== Other affiliated conductors ===
- Wilhelm Furtwängler (1927–1930; as director of the Gesellschaft der Musikfreunde)
- Herbert von Karajan (1948–1964; as director of the Gesellschaft der Musikfreunde)
- Josef Krips (1970–1973; artistic advisor)
- Georges Prêtre (1986–1991; principal guest conductor)
- Marie Jacquot (2023–2026; principal guest conductor)
- Elim Chan (2026-present, Artistic Partner)
