= Alex Prior =

British composer and conductor (born 1992)

Alexander Prior (born 5 October 1992) is a British composer and conductor who is the music director of the Eugene Symphony. He studied from the age of 13 to 17 at the Saint Petersburg Conservatory. He was Chief Conductor of the Edmonton Symphony Orchestra from 2017 to 2022, appointed at the age of 23.

In September 2022, the Edmonton Symphony and Prior released a video of Ian Tyson's Four Strong Winds. Alex has also been a champion of music by younger living composers, especially the music of Nicole Lizée, Gabriella Smith, Vivian Fung, and Alissa Cheung.

Prior has received particular critical praise for his performances of the music of Tchaikovsky, Sibelius, and Bruckner.

His YouTube channel has over 1 million followers and over 15 million views.

== Life and career ==
Prior was born in London to a British father and a Russian-Ukrainian mother, who is a direct descendant of Konstantin Stanislavski. Prior began composing at the age of eight and by his early teens had written 40 works, including symphonies, concertos, two ballets, two operas, and a requiem for the children of Beslan. At an early age, he began piano lessons. He later enrolled in the junior department of the Royal College of Music. At 13, he entered the Saint Petersburg Conservatory where he studied composition with Boris Tishchenko and opera and symphonic conducting with Alexander Alexeev (a pupil of Hans Swarowsky). In 2009, at age 17, he graduated with distinction, with two masters degrees in symphonic and operatic conducting, and in composition from the St. Petersburg Conservatory, a feat previously accomplished by only Sergei Prokofiev.

Prior has conducted the San Francisco, Detroit, Dallas, Toledo, Seattle, Queensland, Düsseldorf, and Houston symphony orchestras. Further collaborations include performances with the Brevard Festival Orchestra, the New World Symphony, Gewandhaus Orchestra in Leipzig, Orquesta Sinfónica de Madrid/Orchestra of Teatro Reál, the Swedish Chamber Orchestra, the Spanish Radio Orchestra, the NDR Elbphilharmonie Orchestra, the Deutsche Kammerphilharmonie Bremen, the Badische Staatskapelle Karslsruhe, the Deustche Staatsphilharmonie Rheinland-Pfalz, the German Radio Orchestra in Saarbrücken, Camerata Salzburg, the Estonian Radio Symphony Orchestra, Polish National Orchestra, the Vienna Chamber Orchestra, the Norwegian Radio Orchestra, the Royal Philharmonic Orchestra, the Royal Northern Sinfonia, the Copenhagen and Calgary Philharmonic orchestras, and the Kristiansand, Helsingborg, and Aarhus Symphony Orchestras.

He was appointed as Chief Conductor of the Edmonton Symphony Orchestra at just 23 years of age (with a designate season prior to commencing his full tenure in 2017). Prior invested greatly in the artistic output and community outreach of the orchestra – championing new music, with a focus on programming which reflects the rich diversity and cultural history of the region. By his third season every masters' series concert featured music by female composers.

In March 2025, he was appointed as the music director designate for the Eugene Symphony in Eugene, Oregon. He commenced his first season as music director in October 2025.

=== Other engagements ===
Other operatic engagements include Martinů's Mirandolina at the Bayerische Staatsoper, Verdi's La Traviata with Leipzig Opera, Rusalka at the Tiroler Festspiele in Erl, Hänsel und Gretel at Vancouver Opera, and two productions of Richard Strauss's Elektra – one with Edmonton Opera and the other with Theater Erfurt, where he also led a critically acclaimed production of Weingartner's epic opera "Orestes" – the first performance of this opera in well over 100 years, as well as a completely sold out production of Wagner's The Flying Dutchman. At Frankfurt Opera, where he has a long-lasting ongoing relationship with the orchestra and the company, he has conducted Verdi's Rigoletto, Martinů's Julietta, and in their symphonic series Holst's The Planets. A planned production of Holländer in 2021 was sadly cancelled due to the COVID19 pandemic. Following his debut with Mozart's The Magic Flute at Staatstheater Braunschweig he was invited back to conduct a new production of Verdi's Rigoletto, after which the orchestra awarded him their prestigious and rare "Louis-Spohr-Medal".

Prior's Piano Concerto No. 1 was premiered at the V International Piano Festival in St. Petersburg in September 2006. Prior was runner-up in the 2008 International Prokofiev Composers Competition – his Piano Concerto No. 2 Northern Dances was performed by the State Academic Symphony of St. Petersburg in the Great Philharmonic Hall. In 2006, Prior's ballet Mowgli (based on Rudyard Kipling's The Jungle Book) was commissioned by choreographers Natalia Kasatkina and Vladimir Vassilev of the Moscow State Classical Ballet. The official premiere took place at the Kremlin Theatre in Moscow in February 2008.

In November 2008, he conducted a performance of Rimsky-Korsakov's The Tsar's Bride in St. Petersburg, followed by a performance of Tchaikovsky's The Nutcracker in January 2009.

On 8 January 2010, the Seattle Symphony appointed Prior as an Assistant Conductor.

In Summer 2010, he was a conducting fellow at the Tanglewood Music Center.

In August 2011, he conducted the world premiere of his Triple Concerto, entitled "That which must forever remain unspoken", with the City Chamber Orchestra of Hong Kong.

In 2011, Prior was the principal conductor for the Northwest Mahler Festival in Seattle.

In December 2011, Prior made his debut with the Royal Danish Orchestra and Royal Danish Ballet performing The Nutcracker at the Royal Danish Theatre in Copenhagen. He has subsequently reinvited to conduct Carmen at the Royal Danish Theatre.

== Awards ==
- Louis Spohr Medal, 2016
- 2nd prize at the Leeds conducting competition at the age of 16
- International Prokofiev Composition Competition
- In Russia he was awarded the order of The Blue Cross, for his contribution to the national and international arts scene, and for his charitable work within music.

== Selected compositions ==
- "Horizons: An American Crescendo for Four Soloists and Orchestra", dedicated to John Adams

=== Concertos ===
- 3 Piano concertos St. Petersburg Dances of the North and No.3
- Concerto for 4 soloists and orchestra Velesslavitsa
- Triple Concerto for Piano, Violin and Cello "That which must forever remain unspoken"

=== Symphonies ===
- No.1 Karelian
- No.2
- No.3 "Northern"
- No.4 "Gogol"

=== Operas ===
- The Desert, based on Alexander Pushkin's tales.

=== Ballets ===
- Mowgli

=== Choral ===
- All Night Vigil
- Sounds of the Homeland
- At the North for SATB Choir on Ivan Bunin's poetry

=== Piano Solo ===
- 10 preludes
- Evenings on the Farm near Dikanka
