= Stephen Gunzenhauser =

American music conductor (born 1942)

Stephen Charles Gunzenhauser (born April 8, 1942) is an American conductor of classical music. He was the music director of the Lancaster Symphony Orchestra for 40 years, retiring after the 2019–20 season. In 2005, he founded the Endless Mountain Music Festival, an annual summer music festival held in towns in Pennsylvania and New York. Gunzenhauser has recorded for Naxos and other labels. He is the 5th most recorded American conductor.

== Early life and education ==
Stephen Charles Gunzenhauser was born in New York, on April 8, 1942. He attended the High School of Music & Art. He then studied at the Oberlin College Conservatory of Music, graduating with a Bachelor of Music degree in 1963, and at the Salzburg Mozarteum. He trained further at New England Conservatory of Music in Boston, taking a master's degree in 1965. He held three Fulbright grants and completed his education at the Cologne Hochschule für Musik, where he was awarded an artist diploma in 1968.

== Career ==
In 1967, Gunzenhauser took first prize in the Santiago conducting competition, and from 1967 to 1969 he guest-conducted the Rhenish Chamber Orchestra, Cologne. He was assistant conductor to Igor Markevitch and l'Orchestre National de l'Opera de Monte Carlo (1968−69), and to Leopold Stokowski and the American Symphony Orchestra in New York (1969−70).

Gunzenhauser was music director of the Brooklyn Center Chamber Orchestra (1970−1972), and was artistic director (1974−1982), then administrative director (1982−1987) of the Wilmington Music School. In 1978, he became music director of the Delaware Symphony Orchestra, and became principal conductor (1978−1981). He later served 40 years as the music director of the Lancaster Symphony Orchestra, Pennsylvania, where he retired after the 2019-20 season. During Game 6 of the 1993 NLCS; he was conducting the seventh inning stretch at Veterans Stadium when a fan stole his baton.

In 2005, Gunzenhauser started the Endless Mountain Music Festival. The festival has a 62-piece orchestra made up of an internationally diverse group of musicians. It is held every summer in cities and towns on the Pennsylvania and New York borders, including Canton, Blossburg, Mansfield, Troy, and Wellsboro, Pennsylvania; and Corning and Elmira, New York. Gunzenhauser first had the idea for the festival when he was visiting the region on a trip with his wife, and was impressed with the area’s natural beauty and the gaslit main street of Wellsboro.

== Awards and honors ==
In 1990, the state of Delaware appointed Gunzenhauser as the state's First Cultural Ambassador.

In 1999, the state of Delaware awarded Gunzenhauser the Order of the First State.

== Personal life ==
Gunzenhauser is married to his wife Shelly. They have two daughters.

== Recordings ==
Gunzenhauser has recorded for Naxos and other labels. He is the 5th most recorded American conductor as of 2019. His 1991 cycle of the nine symphonies of Dvořák was praised. In Gramophone, Ivan March wrote of the conductor:

He is certainly a sympathetic Dvořákian, which is immediately revealed in the evocative pastoral opening of the Fifth Symphony. Here the wind playing of the Slovak orchestra is engagingly full of colour, while later Gunzenhauser directs the fine slow movement with a highly communicative expressive feeling. His contouring of the lovely lyrical theme of the first movement of the Fourth is equally appealing.

Recordings conducted by Gunzenhauser include:

Composer	Work	Soloists/chorus	Orchestra
Beethoven	Overtures: Consecration of the House, Coriolan, Egmont, Leonore No. 3, Prometheus, The Ruins of Athens		Slovak Philharmonic
Bloch	Symphony In C-sharp minor		Slovak Philharmonic
Brahms	Violin Concerto	Takako Nishizaki	Slovak Philharmonic
Bruch	Violin Concerto No. 1	Takako Nishizaki	Slovak Philharmonic
Dvořák	Symphonies 1–9, Symphonic Variations		Slovak Philharmonic
Glière	Symphony No. 1, and The Sirens		Slovak Philharmonic
Grieg	Peer Gynt Suites, Lyric Pieces, Sigurd Jorsalfar orchestral music		CSSR State Philharmonic
Mozart	Violin Concertos 3–5	Takako Nishizaki	Capella Istropolitana
Mozart	Sinfonia Concertante	Takako Nishizaki, Ladislav Kyselák	Capella Istropolitana
Orff	Carmina Burana	Eva Jenisová, Vladimir Doležal, Ivan Kusnjer, Slovak Radio Chorus	Slovak Radio Symphony
Paganini	Violin Concertos Nos. 1 and 2	Ilya Kaler	Polish National Radio Symphony
Rubinstein	Symphony No. 2, "Ocean"		Slovak Philharmonic
Saint-Saëns	Symphony No. 3, "Organ"		Slovak Radio Symphony
Schumann	Piano Concerto, and Introduction and Allegro Appassionato	Sequeira Costa	Gulbenkian Orchestra
Taneyev	Symphonies Nos. 2 and 4		Polish State Philharmonic
Vivaldi	The Four Seasons, Concerto alla rustica	Takako Nishizaki	Capella Istropolitana

== Sources ==
- Borland, Carol, ed. (1983). Who's Who in American Music. New York: Bowker. ISBN 0-8352-1725-6.
- Slonimsky, Nicholas; Kuhn, Laura, eds. (2001). Baker's Biographical Dictionary of Musicians. New York: Schirmer. OCLC 1028661730.
