= Michelle Di Russo =

Argentinian-Italian conductor

- Born: 1990 (age 35–36); Argentina
- Education: Arizona State University, University of Kentucky, Pontifical Catholic University of Argentina
- Occupation: Conductor
- Website: https://www.michelledirusso.com

Michelle Di Russo (born 1990) is an Argentinian-Italian conductor based in the United States. She has served as associate conductor of the North Carolina Symphony, and associate conductor of the Fort Worth Symphony Orchestra. She is music director-designate of the Delaware Symphony Orchestra.

== Early life and education ==
Di Russo was born in Argentina to Italian parents. She earned a degree in orchestral conducting and music production of audiovisual media from Pontifical Catholic University of Argentina. She moved to the United States in 2015, where she earned a Master of Music degree in orchestral conducting from the University of Kentucky and a doctoral degree in orchestral conducting from Arizona State University.

== Career ==
In 2021, Di Russo joined the North Carolina Symphony as an assistant conductor, and was promoted to associate conductor in 2022, the latter appointment with a contract of two years. She also served as interim director of orchestras at Cornell for the 2021-2022 academic year. In 2024, Di Russo was appointed Associate Conductor of the Fort Worth Symphony Orchestra.

Di Russo co-founded Girls Who Conduct, an initiative that promotes gender equality in conducting. In 2021, the Georgia Symphony Orchestra partnered with Girls Who Conduct to launch a fellowship for women conductors. Di Russo was a recipient of a 2024 Solti Foundation U.S. Career Assistance Award.

In November 2023, Di Russo first guest-conducted the Delaware Symphony Orchestra. In March 2025, she returned for a second guest-conducting engagement as one of the four finalists for the post of the orchestra's music director. In May 2025, the orchestra announced the appointment of Di Russo as its next music director, effective with the 2025-2026 season. This appointment marks Di Russo's first leadership post. Di Russo is the first female conductor to be named music director of Delaware Symphony Orchestra.

== Awards ==
Di Russo is the recipient of several conducting fellowships:

- Freeman Conducting Fellowship in Chicago Sinfonietta's 2020-2021 Project Inclusion program
- Conducting Fellowship for the 2021 Dallas Opera Hart Institute
- Dudamel Fellowship for the 2023-2024 season with the Los Angeles Philharmonic

Cultural offices
Preceded by David Amado	Music Director, Delaware Symphony Orchestra; 2025–present	Succeeded by incumbent
