= Alex Beard (arts manager) =

Chief Executive of Royal Opera House

Sir Alex Beard CBE
- Born: October 1963 (age 63)
- Education: King's College, London
- Occupation: Chief Executive
- Organization: Royal Ballet and Opera

Sir Alexander Charles Beard CBE (born October 1963) is a British arts manager, currently serving as the chief executive of the Royal Ballet and Opera (RBO) in London.

Previously, Beard was the deputy director of the Tate from 2002 to 2013. He has also worked for Arts Council England and KPMG.

== Early life ==
He was educated at Manchester Grammar School, Westminster School and King's College London (BA, Classics).

After graduating, Beard worked for Arts Council England for seven years (1986–1993) and for KPMG (1985–1986).

== Tate (2002–2013) ==
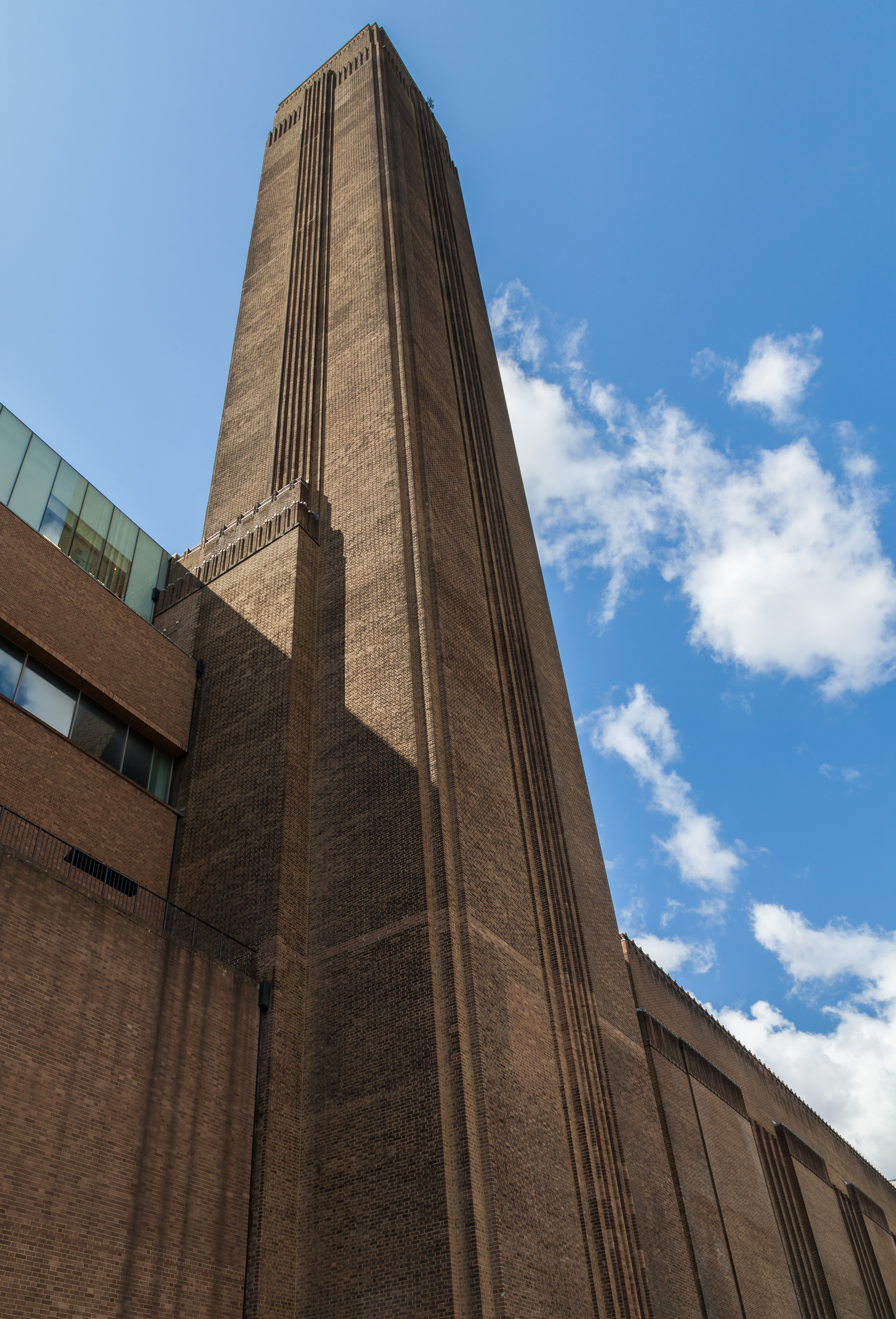
Tate Modern

Beard spent eighteen years with the Tate in a number of roles, including as its Deputy Director from 2002. During his time there, he worked closely on the creation of Tate Modern, while also running the four Tate galleries.

== Royal Ballet and Opera (2013-Present) ==
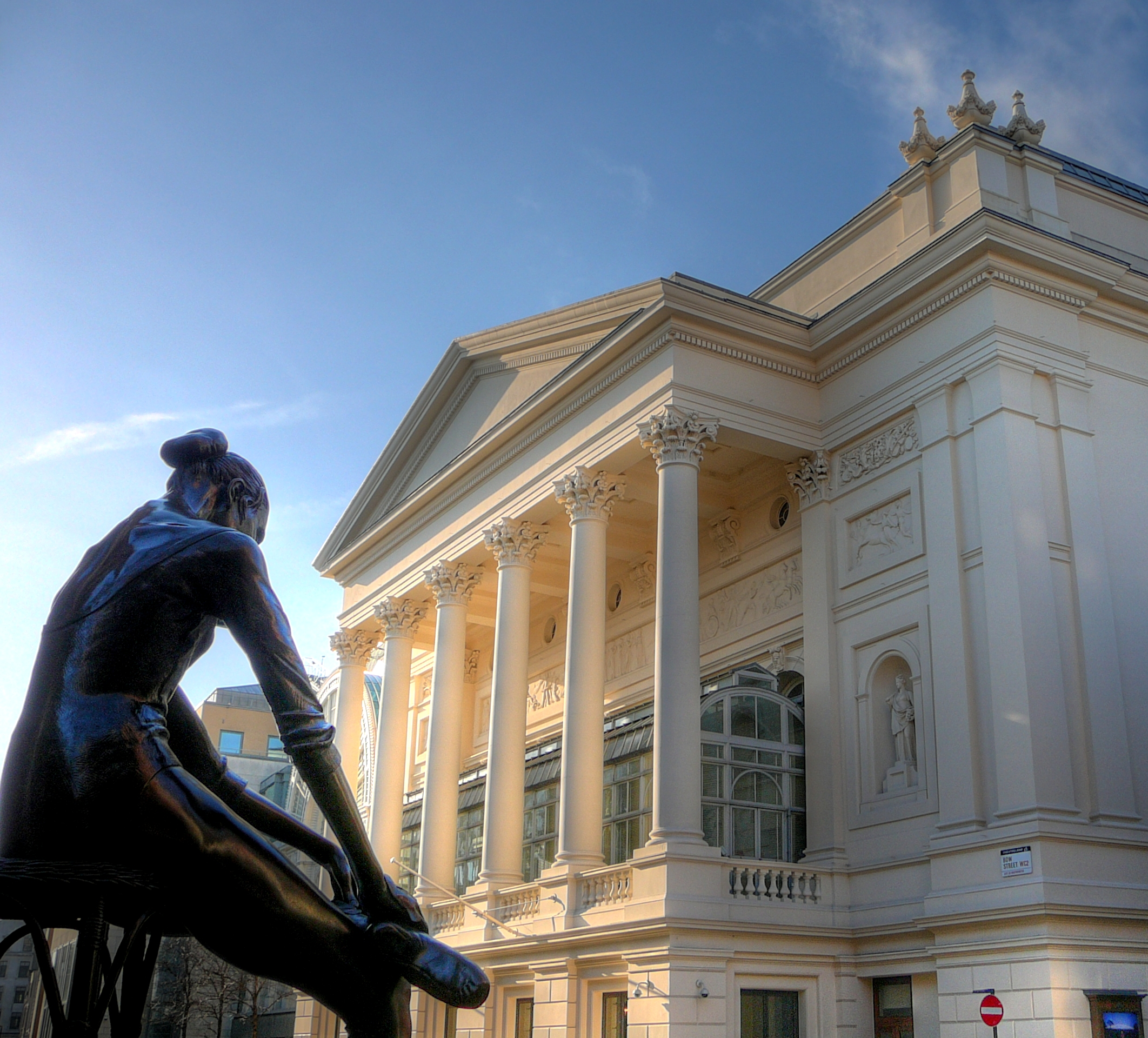
Royal Opera House, Covent Garden

Prior to joining the RBO, he was also a member of the Board of Glyndebourne Productions from 2008 to 2013.

Beard succeeded Tony Hall, who relinquished the post on his appointment as Director-General of the BBC. He took up the post at the RBO in September 2013.

During his tenure as Chief Executive, Beard has overseen a significant transformation of the Royal Opera House:

- He led the delivery of the Open Up project, a major refurbishment of the Royal Opera House to transform the space into an all-day venue. This included the creation of the new Linbury Theatre, which opened in 2019.
- Beard led the organisation through the pandemic, the largest financial challenge in the organisation's history. This included a far-reaching restructuring programme and a major fundraising campaign.
- Across his tenure, the educational role and impact of the RBO has grown significantly, through a suite of new nationwide learning programmes. The organisation now reaches over 140,000 children throughout the UK via its RBO Schools programme.

During his tenure, Beard served as Chair of High House Production Park, an international centre of excellence for the creative industries located at Thurrock in the Thames Gateway.

== Family ==
Alex Beard married Katharine Betty Warde-Aldam in 1993. He has a daughter, Betty Rose Beard, and a son, Alfred John Wells Beard.

== Honours ==
He was appointed a Commander of the Order of the British Empire (CBE) for services to the arts in the 2013 New Year Honours and a Knight Bachelor, again for services to the arts, in the 2025 Birthday Honours.
