= Norwegian Radio Orchestra =

Affiliated with NRK

- Radio orchestra
- Native name: Kringkastingsorkestret
- Short name: KORK
- Founded: 1946; 80 years ago
- Location: Oslo, Norway
- Concert hall: Store Studio, Oslo
- Principal conductor: Holly Hyun Choe
- Website: nrk.no/kork/

The Norwegian Radio Orchestra (Norwegian, Kringkastingsorkestret, abbreviated as KORK) is a radio orchestra affiliated with the Norwegian Broadcasting Corporation (Norsk rikskringkasting AS, or NRK). Its principal base is the Store Studio at the NRK's headquarters in Oslo. The orchestra's current chief administrator is Rolf Lennart Stensø. As of 2018, KORK consists of fifty-nine musicians.

== History ==
KORK was founded in 1946 with twenty-four musicians in the orchestra, from ensembles previously led by Øivind Bergh and Gunnar Knudsen. Øivind Bergh served as its first principal conductor from 1946 to 1976. The orchestra initially secured its reputation in performances of entertainment music and light classics. Sverre Bruland, KORK's second principal conductor from 1976 to 1988, established the orchestra's commitment to presenting contemporary Norwegian music.

Miguel Harth-Bedoya served as principal conductor from 2013 to 2020. In the autumn of 2019, Petr Popelka first guest-conducted KORK. In November 2019, KORK announced the appointment of Popelka as its next principal conductor, effective with the 2020–2021 season. Popelka concluded his KORK tenure at the close of the 2022-2023 season.

In November 2024, Holly Hyun Choe first guest-conducted the orchestra. In March 2025, KORK announced the appointment of Choe as its next principal conductor, effective January 2026. Choe is the first female conductor to be named principal conductor of the Norwegian Radio Orchestra.

KORK has recorded commercially for labels including Pro Musica, Bridge Records, and Finlandia. In addition to concerts and commercial recordings, the orchestra performs every year at the Nobel Peace Prize Concert. KORK has also worked in areas of popular music, such as providing backing to the Eurovision Song Contest in Norway in 1986 and 1996, as well as various activities in rock and jazz.

In 2011, KORK was awarded the Telenor Culture Prize Boundless Communication.

== Principal conductors ==
- Øivind Bergh (1946–1976)
- Sverre Bruland (1976–1988)
- Avi Ostrowsky (1989–1992)
- Ari Rasilainen (1994–2002)
- Rolf Gupta (2003–2006)
- Thomas Søndergård (2009–2012)
- Miguel Harth-Bedoya (2013–2020)
- Petr Popelka (2020–2023)
- Holly Hyun Choe (2026–present)
