= Eugene Symphony =

American symphony orchestra

- Orchestra
- Concert hall: Silva Concert Hall, Hult Center for the Performing Arts
- Music director: Alex Prior
- Website: eugenesymphony.org

The Eugene Symphony is an American orchestra based in Eugene, Oregon. The Eugene Symphony is a resident company of the Hult Center for the Performing Arts and performs in the center's Silva Hall in downtown Eugene and Cuthbert Amphitheater located near Alton Baker Park. Approximately 27,000 people attend Eugene Symphony's classical and pops concert performances each year. In 2025 the Eugene Symphony will begin its 60th performance season.

The current music director is Alex Prior.

The Eugene Symphony was founded in 1965 by a small group of musicians and supporters who first envisioned the orchestra during a rehearsal in the living room of co-founder and oboist Caroline Boekelheide.

== Former music directors ==
Former music directors include:

- Marin Alsop (1989–1996)
- Miguel Harth Bedoya (1996–2002)
- Giancarlo Guerrero (2002–2009)
- Danial Rachev (2009–2017)
- Francesco Lecce-Chong (2017–2024)

== See also ==
- List of symphony orchestras in the United States
