= List of compositions by Michael Daugherty =

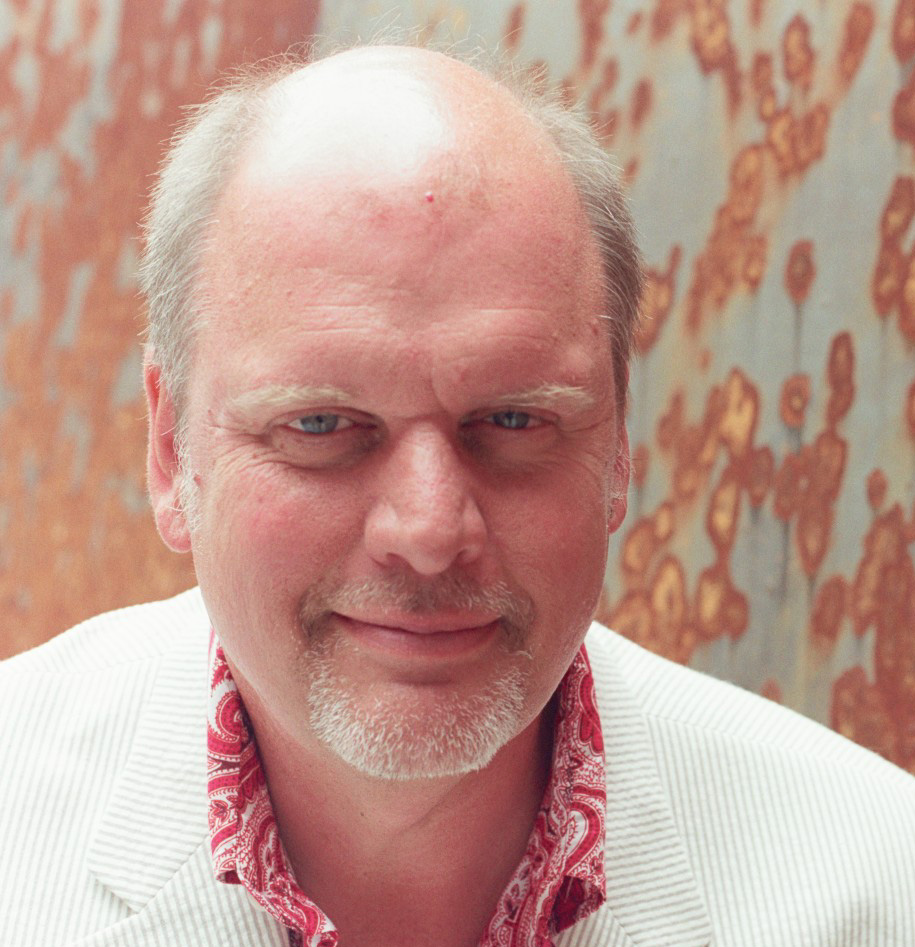
Michael Kevin Daugherty

This is a list of compositions by Michael Daugherty, arranged by musical forces required.

== Compositions ==
=== Orchestra ===
- Dancing in the Streets (2026)
- Fifteen: Symphonic Fantasy on the Art of Andy Warhol (2022)
- To the New World (2019)
- Night Owl (2018)
- Rio Grande (2015)
- American Gothic (2013)
- Lost Vegas (2012)
- Radio City: Symphonic Fantasy on Arturo Toscanini and the NBC Symphony Orchestra (2011)
- Mount Rushmore for chorus and orchestra (2010)
- Letters from Lincoln for baritone and orchestra (2009)
- Achilles Heel from Troyjam (2009)
- Troyjam for Narrator and Orchestra (2008)
- March of the Metro (2008)
- Ghost Ranch (2005)
- Above Clouds from Ghost Ranch (2005)
- Tell My Fortune (2004)
- Time Machine for three conductors and orchestra (2003)
- Pachelbel's Key for youth orchestra (2002)
- Philadelphia Stories (2001)
- Motor City Triptych (2000)
- Sunset Strip (1999)
- Route 66 (1998)
- Leap Day for youth orchestra (1996)
- Metropolis Symphony (1988–1993)
- Flamingo (1991)

=== String orchestra ===
- Octet: Mendelssohn-Daugherty (2002)
- Strut (1989)

=== Concerti with orchestra ===
- Blue Electra for violin and orchestra (2022)
- Tales of Hemingway for cello and orchestra (2015)
- Dreamachine for solo percussion and orchestra (2014)
- Fallingwater for violin and string orchestra (2013)
- Reflections on the Mississippi for tuba and orchestra (2013)
- Passage to Petra for bassoon, strings and percussion (2011)
- Trail of Tears for flute and orchestra (2010)
- Gee's Bend for electric guitar and orchestra (2009)
- Deus Ex Machina for piano and orchestra (2007)
- Bay of Pigs for classical guitar and string orchestra (2006)
- Above Clouds for four horns and orchestra (2005)
- Crystal for flute, alto flute, and chamber orchestra, from Tell My Fortune (2004)
- Once Upon a Castle for organ and orchestra (2003/rev.2015)
- Fire and Blood for violin and orchestra (2003)
- Raise the Roof for timpani and orchestra (2003)
- Tell-Tale Harp for two harps and orchestra, from Philadelphia Stories (2001)
- UFO for solo percussion and orchestra (1999)
- Hell's Angels for bassoon quartet and orchestra (1998–99)
- Spaghetti Western for English horn and orchestra (1998)
- Le Tombeau de Liberace for piano and orchestra (1996)
- Mxyzptlk for 2 flutes and chamber orchestra, from Metropolis Symphony (1988)

=== Symphonic band, concert band, or wind ensemble ===
- Passacaglia in Primary Colors (2023)
- Made for You and Me: Inspired by Woody Guthrie for adaptable band (2020)
- Of War and Peace (2017)
- Rio Grande (2015)
- Winter Dreams (2015)
- Vulcan (2014)
- On the Air (2012)
- Lost Vegas (2011)
- Bells for Stokowski (2002)
- Alligator Alley (2002)
- Red Cape Tango (1999)
- Niagara Falls (1997)
- Bizarro (1993)
- Desi (1991)

=== Concerti with symphonic band or symphonic winds ===
- Reflections on the Mississippi for tuba and symphonic band (2015)
- The Gospel According to Sister Aimee for organ, brass and percussion (2012)
- Raise the Roof for timpani and symphonic band (2007)
- Ladder to the Moon for solo violin, wind octet, double bass and percussion (2006)
- Brooklyn Bridge for clarinet and symphonic band (2005)
- Rosa Parks Boulevard for three trombones and symphonic band (2001)
- UFO for solo percussion and symphony band (2000)
- Dead Elvis for solo bassoon and chamber ensemble (1993)

=== Chorus ===
- Writ in Water for chorus (2018)
- Mount Rushmore for chorus and orchestra (2010)

=== Voice and orchestra or chamber ensemble ===
- This Land Sings: Inspired by the Life and Times of Woody Guthrie for soprano, baritone and chamber ensemble (2016)
- Letters from Lincoln for baritone and orchestra (2009)
- TROYJAM for narrator and orchestra (2008)
- What's That Spell? for two sopranos and chamber ensemble (1995)

=== Voice and wind ensemble or symphonic winds ===
- Songs from a Silent Land for soprano and symphonic winds (2019)
- Labyrinth of Love for soprano and chamber winds, piano, double bass and percussion (2013)

=== Opera ===
- Jackie O (1997)

=== Large chamber ensemble ===
- Steamboat for Trombone Choir (2014)
- The Gospel According to Sister Aimee for organ, brass and percussion (2012)
- Passage to Petra for solo bassoon, strings and percussion (2011)
- Asclepius Fanfare for brass and percussion (2007)
- Ladder to the Moon for solo violin, wind octet, double bass and percussion (2006)
- Timbuktuba for euphonium/tubas ensemble and percussion (1996)
- What's That Spell? for two sopranos and chamber ensemble (1995)
- Motown Metal for brass and percussion (1994)
- Snap! (1987)
- Blue Like an Orange (1987)

=== Small chamber ensemble ===
- Kansas City Confidential for 2 saxophones and piano (doubling harmonica) (2025)
- The Water is Wide for 5 trumpets and organ (2018)
- The Old Man and the Sea for Cello, Violin and Piano (2016)
- The Diaries of Adam and Eve for violin, double bass and optional narrators (2016)
- The Lightning Fields for trumpet and piano (2015)
- Prayer for two horns and piano (2014)
- Steamboat for saxophone quartet (2014)
- Bay of Pigs for acoustic guitar and string quartet (2006)
- Diamond in the Rough for violin, viola and percussion (2006)
- Elvis Everywhere for saxophone quartet and pre-recorded sound or three Elvis Impersonators (2006)
- Regrets Only for violin, cello and piano (2006)
- Walk the Walk for baritone saxophone (or bass clarinet or contrabassoon) and percussion (2005)
- Crystal, from Tell My Fortune for flute, alto flute and piano (2004)
- The High and the Mighty for piccolo and piano (2000)
- Used Car Salesman for percussion quartet (2000)
- Sinatra Shag for solo violin, bass clarinet, cello, piano and percussion (1997)
- Yo amaba a Lucy (I Loved Lucy) for flute and classical guitar (1996)
- Lounge Lizards for two pianos and two percussion (1994)
- Dead Elvis for solo bassoon and chamber ensemble (1993)
- Lex for electric violin, four percussion, timpani, synthesizers and electric bass (1991)
- Firecracker for solo oboe, flute (piccolo), bass clarinet, violin, cello, percussion and piano (1991)
- Viola Zombie for two violas (1991)
- Bounce for two bassoons (1988)

=== Percussion ensemble ===
- Used Car Salesman for percussion quartet (2000)
- Shaken Not Stirred for three percussion and electric bass (1994)

=== String quartet and pre-recorded sound ===
- Paul Robeson Told Me for string quartet and pre-recorded sound (1994)
- Elvis Everywhere for string quartet and pre-recorded sound or three Elvis Impersonators and Baritone Saxophone (1993)
- Sing Sing: J. Edgar Hoover for string quartet and pre-recorded sound (1992)

=== Solo instrument ===
- Viva for violin (2014)
- Buffalo Dance for piano (2012)
- Everybody's Got the Right for piano (2012)
- An Evangelist Drowns for organ (from The Gospel According to Sister Aimee for organ, brass and percussion) (2012)
- Venetian Blinds for piano (2002)
- Monk in the Kitchen for piano (2001)
- Jackie's Song for cello (1996)
- Piano Plus for piano (1985)
