= Route 66 (composition) =

Single-movement composition for orchestra

Route 66 is a single-movement composition for orchestra by the American composer Michael Daugherty. The piece was commissioned by the Kalamazoo Symphony Orchestra and premiered on April 25, 1998, at the Irving S. Gilmore International Keyboard Festival in East Lansing, Michigan under conductor Yoshimi Takeda.

== Style and composition ==
Inspired by the historic American highway U.S. Route 66, the piece combines elements of jazz, Latin music, and orchestral writing in what Daugherty called "a high-octane nostalgic musical romp from Illinois to California along America’s first intercontinental highway, as seen through my rear view mirror." The work lasts roughly 7 minutes in duration and was described by James Manheim of AllMusic as containing "lots of contrapuntal brass and wind material underpinned by fast-moving syncopated percussion."

=== Instrumentation ===
Route 66 is scored for two flutes, piccolo, two oboes, English horn, E♭ clarinet, B♭ clarinet, bass clarinet, two bassoons, contrabassoon, four French horns, four trumpets, three trombones, tuba, timpani, four percussionists (xylophone/glockenspiel; vibraphone; marimba; brake drum/two cowbells/two bongo drums or timbales/sizzle cymbal/medium ride cymbal/splash cymbal/three triangles/three wood blocks), harp, piano, and strings (violins I & II, violas, violoncellos, and double basses).

== Reception ==
Alex Chilvers of Limelight praised Route 66 as "... a big, boisterous Cadillac of a piece, intended to convey the experience of driving from Illinois to California [...] in only seven busy, energetic minutes". Mark Estren of The Washington Post similarly praised Daugherty's writing as "propulsive, accessible yet well constructed and deeply imbued with the spirits of both romanticism and postmodernism." Ivan Hewett of The Daily Telegraph lauded Daugherty as "the orchestral chronicler of American culture" and described the piece, in addition to Daugherty's Sunset Strip, as "winning and affectionate." Hewett continued, "In works such as Route 66 and Sunset Strip he paints the hopes and dreams embodied in Interstate highways, wide-open spaces and all-night bars where Frank Sinatra crooned."

== Discography ==
A recording of the piece, performed by the Bournemouth Symphony Orchestra under conductor Marin Alsop, was released January 4, 2011 through Naxos Records and features Daugherty's other orchestral works Ghost Ranch, Sunset Strip, and Time Machine.

== See also ==
- List of compositions by Michael Daugherty
