= Falling Water =

Falling Water or Fallingwater may refer to:

- Falling Water (TV series), a TV series on the USA Network
- Fallingwater, a house in Pennsylvania designed by Frank Lloyd Wright
- Fallingwater (composition), a concerto inspired by the house in Pennsylvania designed by Frank Lloyd Wright
- Fallingwater (album), a 2005 album by Lisa Miskovsky
- "Fallingwater" (song), a 2018 single by Maggie Rogers
- Falling Water, Tennessee, a census-designated place and unincorporated community in Hamilton County, Tennessee
- Falling Water River, a river located in Putnam County, Tennessee
- Falling Water (sculpture), a 1972 sculpture and fountain by Lin Emery

== See also ==
- Falling Waters (disambiguation)
- Waterfall
