= Ghost Ranch (composition) =

Ghost Ranch is a three-movement orchestral composition by the American composer Michael Daugherty. Inspired by the life and work of artist Georgia O'Keeffe, the title is derived from the name of O'Keeffe's New Mexico summer home, Ghost Ranch. The piece was commissioned by BBC Radio 3, completed in 2005, and premiered February 8, 2006 in Poole, United Kingdom, with the Bournemouth Symphony Orchestra led by conductor Marin Alsop.

== Composition ==
Ghost Ranch is in three movements:

1. "Bone"
2. "Above Clouds"
3. "Black Rattle"

The composition of the piece was designed to musically illustrate the visuals of O'Keeffe's paintings, such as the rattle of animal bones, barking coyotes, and the rigid, vast landscapes of the American West. A performance of the complete work lasts approximately 24 minutes, though the second movement "Above Clouds" is sometimes performed as a standalone piece.

=== Instrumentation ===
Ghost Ranch is scored for two flutes (doubling piccolo), two oboes, English horn, two clarinets, bass clarinet, two bassoons, contrabassoon, four French horns, three trumpets, two trombones, bass trombone, tuba, timpani, three percussionists (I=chimes/glockenspiel/bass drum/small slapstick/large slapstick/small woodblock; II=vibraphone/African rattle/bongos/crash cymbals/tambourine/small triangle/large woodblock; III=glockenspiel/xylophone/piccolo snare drum/suspended cymbal/medium triangle/metal wind chimes/medium woodblock/vibraslap), and strings (violins I & II, violas, violoncellos, and double basses).

== Reception ==
Alex Chilvers of Limelight called the music "harmonically varied and eminently easy on the ear". Mark Estren of The Washington Post also praised the work, specifically regarding the second movement "Above Clouds" as possessing "an especially broad sonic canvas."

== Discography ==
A recording of Ghost Ranch, performed by the Bournemouth Symphony Orchestra under conductor Marin Alsop, was released January 4, 2011 through Naxos Records on a compilation album also featuring Daugherty's other orchestral works Route 66, Sunset Strip, and Time Machine.

== See also ==
- List of compositions by Michael Daugherty
