= Tales of Hemingway =

2015 concerto for cello and orchestra

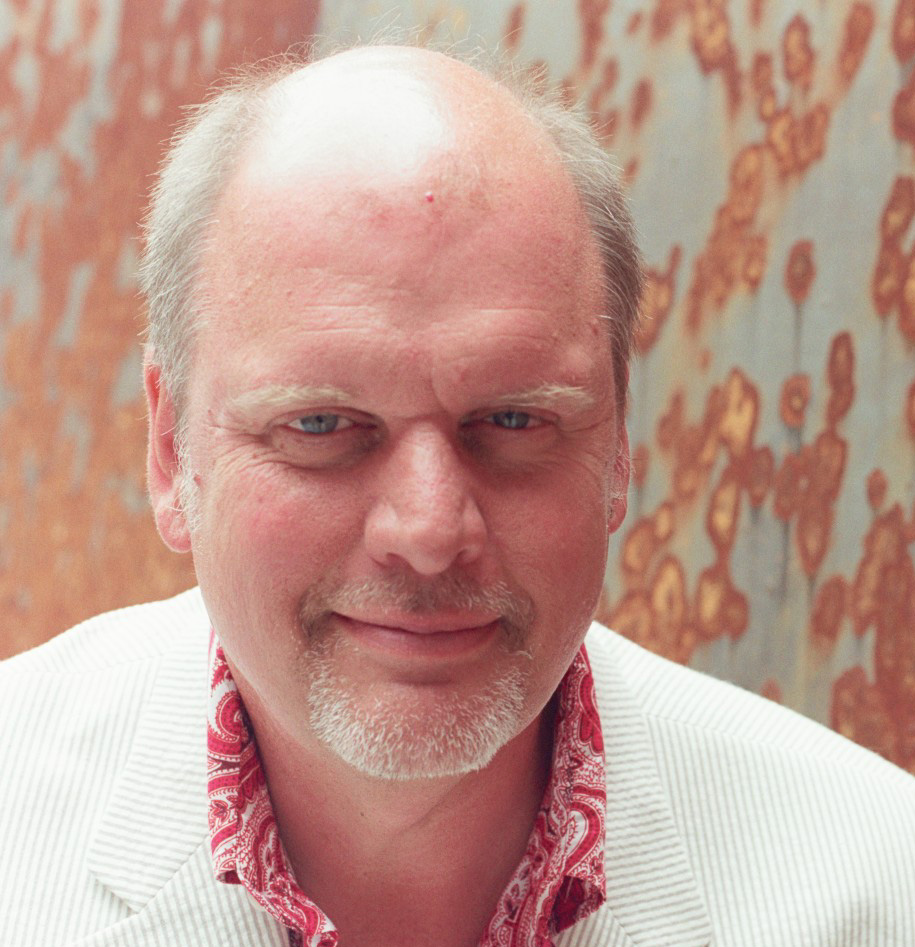
Michael Daugherty

Tales of Hemingway is a concerto for cello and orchestra composed in 2015 by the American composer Michael Daugherty. The music is inspired by the writings of the famous American writer Ernest Hemingway.

== History ==
The concerto was originally commissioned by the Nashville Symphony and a consortium including the Asheville Symphony Orchestra, Detroit Symphony Orchestra, El Paso Symphony Orchestra, Erie Philharmonic, Redwood Symphony and Virginia Symphony Orchestra. The world premiere was given by the Nashville Symphony conducted by Giancarlo Guerrero, with cellist Zuill Bailey on April 17, 2015, at the Schermerhorn Symphony Center in downtown Nashville, Tennessee.

The world premiere performance was reviewed by Nashville music critic John Pitcher. His analysis was that the composer "approached his work as a kind of sonic landscape painter [...] Cellist Zuill Bailey played throughout with a sensuous tone and technical finesse. Music director Giancarlo Guerrero and the NSO provided colorful and dramatic accompaniment." The Midwest premiere was given by the Detroit Symphony Orchestra. Detroit Free Press music writer Mark Stryker described the work as having a "more soulful emotional cast...a breadth of color, texture, dynamics and feeling in the virtuoso solo writing."

== Recording and reception ==
The concerto was recorded in 2015 with the Nashville Symphony and released on the Naxos label. Many critics reviewed the recording very favorably, including a 10/10 for both categories of artistic quality and sound quality from music critic David Hurwitz. Donald Rosenberg of Gramophone wrote:

Tales of Hemingway for cello and orchestra (2015) portrays four of the novelist’s stories in music of sweeping drama and poetry. Daugherty sends the cello soaring and singing with the orchestra as he summons key moments in the Hemingway books. The solo writing calls for an artist of eloquent persuasion, and Zuill Bailey more than meets the score’s demands with playing that combines fervour and poetry.

In February 2017 the piece won three Grammy Awards, for Best Classical Compendium, Best Classical Instrumental Solo and Best Contemporary Classical Composition.

== Music ==
The concerto is composed in four movements, each drawn from a different work by Ernest Hemingway.

1. Big Two-Hearted River (Seney, Michigan, 1925)
2. For Whom the Bell Tolls (1940, Spanish Civil War)
3. The Old Man and the Sea (1952, Cuba)
4. The Sun Also Rises (1926, Pamplona, Spain)

The musical score includes extensive program notes written by the composer, explaining the inspiration for and design of each movement.

=== I. Big Two-Hearted River (Seney, Michigan, 1925) ===
This movement is based on Hemingway's short story about a soldier home from World War I who travels to northern Michigan to work through his PTSD. The program notes in the musical score the composer explains that he created "a leitmotif [symbolizing the idea that] one can be healed by the power of nature through exploring isolated outdoor terrains."

=== II. For Whom the Bell Tolls (1940, Spanish Civil War) ===
The cello represents the main character in this popular Hemingway novel, Robert Jordan. At the conclusion of the movement, the chimes are meant to represent the famous line from the novel: “And therefore never send to know for whom the bell tolls; it tolls for thee.”

=== III. The Old Man and the Sea (1952, Cuba) ===
This movement is an elegy representing the struggle between man and nature which is the main theme of the Hemingway novella.

=== IV. The Sun Also Rises (1926, Pamplona, Spain) ===
This movement uses heavy Spanish musical influences to represent the running of the bulls in Pamplona, Spain which is the setting from the Hemingway novel from which this movement takes its name.
