= Time Machine (composition) =

Orchestral composition

Time Machine for Three Conductors and Orchestra is a two-movement orchestral composition by the American composer Michael Daugherty. The piece was commissioned by the Pittsburgh Symphony Orchestra and premiered on November 24, 2003, with the Pittsburgh Symphony Orchestra led by the conductors Mariss Jansons, Lucas Richman, and Edward Cumming.

== Style and composition ==
The piece has a duration of roughly twenty minutes and is divided into two movements:

1. Past
2. Future

To perform Time Machine, a standard symphony orchestra must be divided into three separate ensembles and led by three conductors simultaneously. Rhythm, tempo, and time signature are frequently juxtaposed between the three ensembles, resulting in an often antiphonal and polymetric sounds. Daugherty described the piece in the score program note, writing:

Time Machine is an adventure in rhythm, sound and space for three conductors and orchestra. Twenty minutes in length, my composition is divided into two movements entitled "Past" and "Future." By dividing the orchestra into three spatially separated orchestras, I represent the three dimensions of space: forward-backward; left-right; up-down. Orchestra I is located stage right, Orchestra II is located stage left and Orchestra III is located center stage. Because I have composed music where multiple tempos and meters occur simultaneously in the three orchestras, three conductors are required. When the three orchestras play simultaneously, they create a three-dimensional music that makes it possible to travel through the fourth dimension of time.

In a pre-premiere interview about the piece, Daugherty convivially added, "It is not a particularly practical idea. I saw it as a challenge. Part of being new is to look at musical expression and to discover new things. Part of what avant-garde music is all about is doing something you are not supposed to do — forbidden music."

=== Instrumentation ===
The work is scored an orchestra comprising for four flutes (fourth doubling piccolo), two oboes, cor anglais, three clarinets (third doubling E♭ clarinet), bass clarinet, four bassoons (fourth doubling contrabassoon), four French horns, four trumpets, three trombones, bass trombone, tuba, timpani, five percussionists, harp, and strings.

== Reception ==
Alex Chilvers of Limelight called Time Machine "an interesting concept" and "dramatic and never dull." Mark Estren of The Washington Post praised the work as "blar[ing] along just wonderfully, from a sonic point of view, providing an effective contrast between 'Past' and 'Future'."

== Discography ==
A recording of Time Machine was released January 4, 2011, through Naxos Records on a compilation album also featuring Daugherty's other orchestral works Route 66, Ghost Ranch, and Sunset Strip. To perform the work, the Bournemouth Symphony Orchestra was led by conductors Marin Alsop, Mei-Ann Chen, and Laura Jackson.

== See also ==
- List of compositions by Michael Daugherty
