= American Gothic (disambiguation) =

American Gothic is a 1930 painting by Grant Wood.

American Gothic may also refer to:

== Music ==
- American Gothic (album), a 1972 album by David Ackles
- American Gothic (EP), a 2008 EP by the Smashing Pumpkins
- "American Gothic", a song by British rock band the Cult on the 2001 album Beyond Good and Evil
- American Gothic (composition), a 2013 orchestral piece composed by Michael Daugherty

== Literature ==
- American gothic fiction, the American form of the gothic literary genre
- American Gothic (novel), a 1974 psychological horror novel by Robert Bloch
- American Gothic (comics), a 2005 Weird West story from 2000 AD magazine
- "American Gothic", a storyline by Alan Moore in the comic Swamp Thing

== Film and television ==
- American Gothic (1988 film), a British-Canadian horror film
- American Gothic (2007 film), a drama-fantasy film written and directed by David Wexler
- American Gothic (1995 TV series), a 1995–96 television series created by Shaun Cassidy
- American Gothic (2016 TV series), a 2016 television series created by Corinne Brinkerhoff and James Frey
- "American Gothic" (Switched at Birth), a 2011 television episode

== Other ==
- American Gothic, Washington, D.C., a photo by Gordon Parks

== See also ==
- American Gothic House, a house in Eldon, Iowa that was the backdrop for the painting
