= Raise the Roof (composition) =

21st-century timpani concerto by Michael Daugherty

Raise the Roof is a one-movement concerto for timpani and orchestra by the American composer Michael Daugherty. The work was commissioned by the Detroit Symphony Orchestra for the opening of the Max M. Fisher Music Center. It was premiered in Detroit, October 16, 2003, with conductor Neeme Järvi leading the Detroit Symphony Orchestra and timpanist Brian Jones. Daugherty later arranged the piece for concert band in 2007; this arrangement was commissioned by the University of Michigan Symphony Band and was premiered under conductor Michael Haithcock at the National Conference of the College Band Directors National Association on March 30, 2007. Raise the Roof is one of Daugherty's most-programmed pieces and has been frequently performed as a concert opener since its publication.

== Composition ==
Raise the Roof has a duration of approximately twelve minutes and is composed in a single movement. The piece has influences of rock and roll and latin rhythms, and utilizes significant portions of extended technique in the solo part, including the use of foot pedals for melodic tuning, playing with an upside-down cymbal on the drumhead, and striking the drums with maraca sticks, wire brushes, and even the player's bare hands. It also employs the use of a medieval plainsong, which is repeated and developed throughout the work. Daugherty has cited architectural marvels as an inspiration for the composition, including the Notre-Dame Cathedral and the Empire State Building.

=== Instrumentation ===
The original orchestral arrangement of the piece is scored for two flutes, piccolo, two oboes, English horn, two clarinets, bass clarinet, two bassoons, contrabassoon, four French horns, three trumpets, two trombones, bass trombone, tuba, timpani, three percussionists, piano, and strings.

The subsequent arrangement for concert band is scored for solo timpani, five flutes (V doubling on piccolo), two oboes, English horn, four clarinets, E-flat clarinet, bass clarinet, two bassoons, contrabassoon, two alto saxophones, tenor saxophone, baritone saxophone, four French horns, three trumpets, three trombones, two euphoniums, two tubas, six percussionists, piano, and two double basses.

== Reception ==
Reviewing the concert band arrangement of the piece, Lawrence Budmen of the South Florida Classical Review praised Raise the Roof, calling it "a joyous romp that adds rock and big band sounds to the classical mix with lovable irreverence."

The concert band version was awarded the American Bandmasters Association's Ostwald Award in 2007.

== Discography ==
Raise the Roof was released on disc through Naxos Records in August 2009, along with Daugherty's other works the MotorCity Triptych and the violin concerto Fire and Blood.

== See also ==
- List of compositions by Michael Daugherty
