= Falling Water (sculpture) =

Sculpture in Oklahoma City, Oklahoma, U.S.

- Aquamobile
- The sculpture in 2019
- Artist: Lin Emery
- Year: 1972
- Medium: Metal sculpture; stone fountain
- Location: Oklahoma City, Oklahoma, U.S.
- 35.470046°N 97.516660°W

Falling Water, also known as Aquamobile, is an outdoor 1972 sculpture and fountain by Lin Emery, installed outside the Bank of Oklahoma building (201 Robert S. Kerr Avenue) in Oklahoma City, in the U.S. state of Oklahoma.

== Description ==
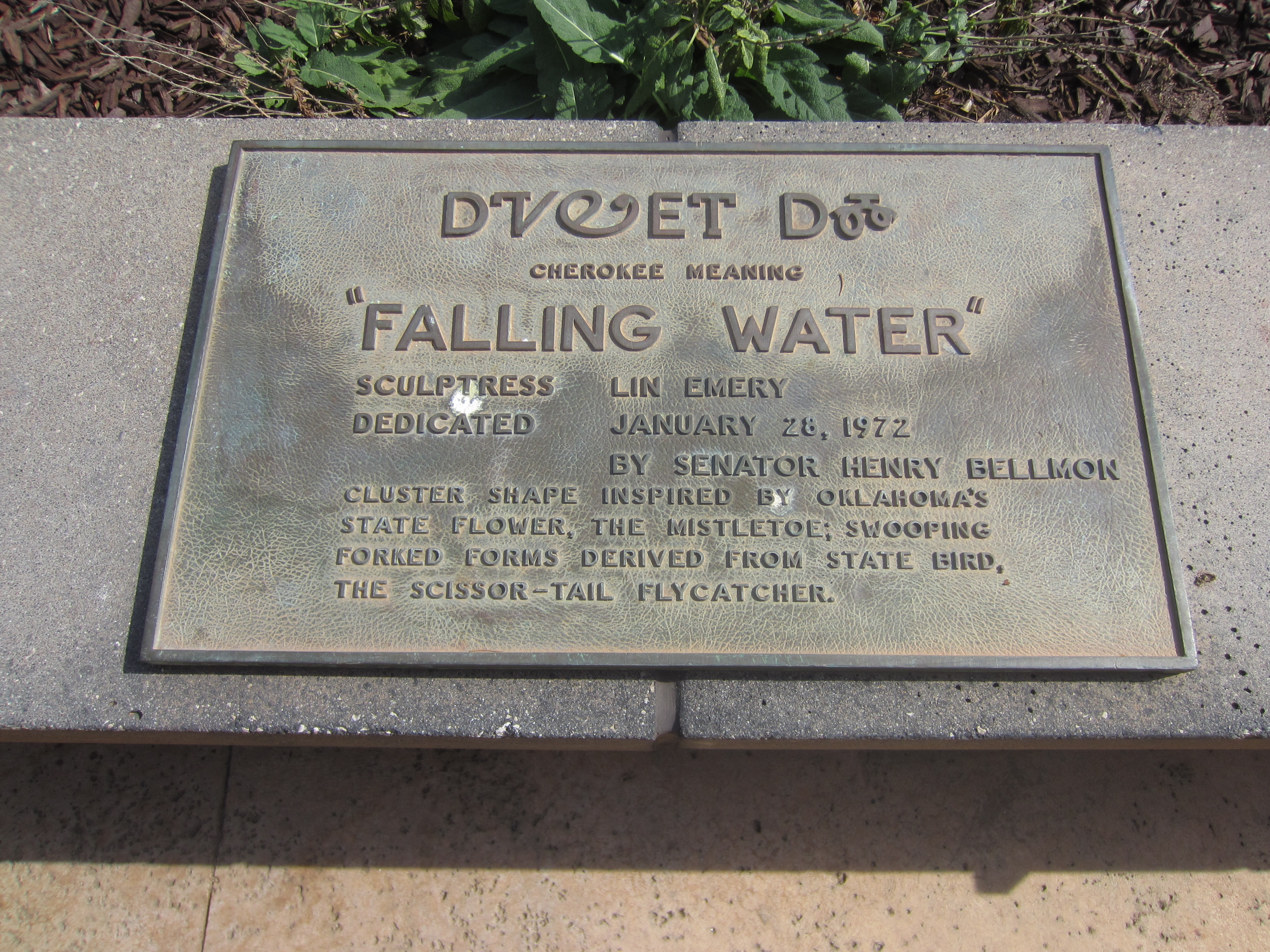
Plaque for the sculpture, 2019

The abstract and kinetic metal sculpture rests in a fountain with a stone basin. The basin's east side has holes which originally supported "Fidelity Bank" lettering.

== History ==
The artwork was dedicated on January 28, 1972. It was surveyed as part of the Smithsonian Institution's "Save Outdoor Sculpture!" program in 1994.

== See also ==
- 1972 in art
