= Falling Waters (disambiguation) =

Falling Waters is a census-designated place in West Virginia.

Falling Waters may also refer to:

- Battle of Falling Waters (1861), or the Battle of Hoke's Run, occurring July 2, 1861 near Falling Waters, Virginia (now West Virginia)
- Battle of Falling Waters (1863), or the Battle of Williamsport, occurring July 6–16, 1863 near Williamsport, Maryland
- Falling Waters State Park, near Chipley, Florida

== See also ==
- Falling Water (disambiguation)
