= Redwood Symphony =

Orchestra in Palo Alto, California

- Orchestra
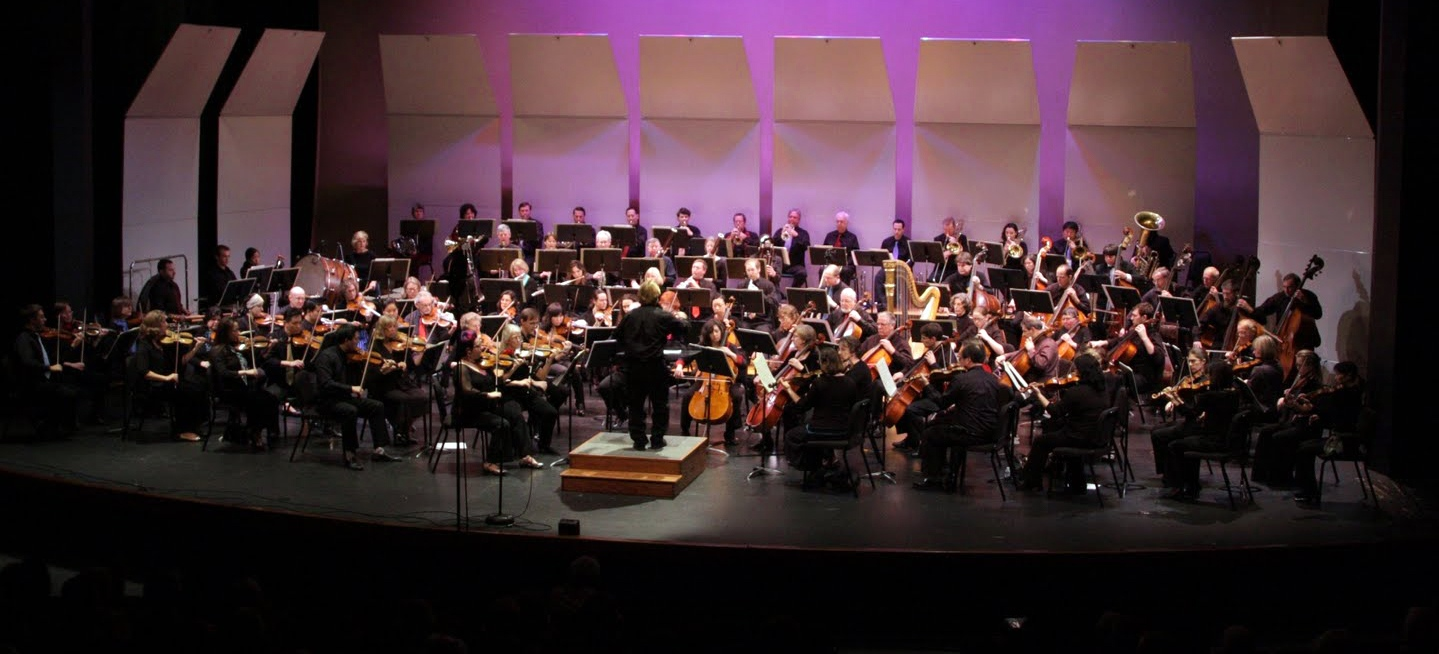
- Redwood Symphony (2012)
- Founded: 1985 (41 years ago) (by Eric Kujawsky)
- Location: Palo Alto, California, U.S.
- Principal conductor: Dr. Eric Kujawsky
- Website: redwoodsymphony.org

The Redwood Symphony is an American orchestra, based in Redwood City, California, in the San Francisco Bay Area. It is the orchestra-in-residence at Cañada College.

The Redwood Symphony is an all-volunteer orchestra that emphasizes contemporary repertoire and alternative approaches to traditional orchestral performances. The orchestra experiments with concert formats and maintains a more informal dress code compared to many traditional symphony orchestras. Its performances have included the complete symphonies of Gustav Mahler, as well as numerous local and world premieres.

== Mission and history ==
The Redwood Symphony was founded in 1985 by Eric Kujawsky as an outgrowth of the Stanford Summer Orchestra, which Kujawsky established while pursuing a Doctor of Musical Arts degree in conducting at Stanford University. The orchestra initially performed at Foothill College before relocating to Cañada College in August 1987.

The orchestra was founded on three premises, with the first being that the San Francisco Peninsula's population of professionals and established musical ensembles provided a potential pool of amateur musicians interested in performing repertoire traditionally associated with professional orchestras. The Redwood Symphony operates primarily as a volunteer ensemble, occasionally employing paid musicians, particularly guest soloists. The orchestra has also released six studio-recorded CDs.

The second premise is that an orchestra, even a community orchestra, should enthusiastically promote contemporary music to keep classical music relevant in an age dominated by pop music. The Redwood Symphony has a strong record not only of premieres but of also doing the first local performances of important works after they've been premiered by the San Francisco Symphony or Cabrillo Music Festival. Besides Mahler symphonies, the Redwood Symphony has performed most of the major orchestral works of Igor Stravinsky and Béla Bartók, as well as music by John Adams, Michael Daugherty, Aaron Copland and other 20th- and 21st-century composers.

The third premise is that the Redwood Symphony would strive to differentiate itself from the competition not in only repertoire, but also in concert format and dress, appealing more to audiences that are new to classical music. Dress is "formal casual"; black with a "splash of color", with jackets and ties generally eschewed. Encores and extra small works are often slipped into the programming, the orchestra is used to demonstrate important points, and comedy bits—including an ongoing series of recorded reminders to turn off cell phones—are interpolated. Unlike other symphonies or venues, The Redwood Symphony is noted for allowing the silent use of mobile devices with lighted screens from within a designated seating area during performances.

The Redwood Symphony is also dedicated to educational outreach, introducing and fostering an appreciation of classical and contemporary music especially by youth. In order to reach newer and younger audiences, the Redwood Symphony offers free admission to most performances for children under 18 when accompanied by an adult. It also features an annual "Meet the Orchestra" night at its "Family Concert," where the orchestra sections divide themselves into separate rooms to meet audience members prior to the main performance. During these sessions, members of the orchestra demonstrate their various instruments, sounds, and techniques, all while answering questions presented. The annual Family Concert also provides the opportunity for a limited number of children in the audience to conduct the Redwood Symphony under the tutelage of Dr. Kujawsky.

Highlights of the Redwood Symphony's history include:

- Notable premieres (see below)
- A complete Mahler symphony cycle (and a nearly complete second cycle), including two different versions of the complete Tenth Symphony.
- John Corigliano's Symphony No. 1 (“Of Rage and Remembrance”) (1993)
- Charles Ives's Symphony No. 4 (1998)
- Michael Daugherty's Metropolis Symphony (2002)
- H.K. Gruber's Frankenstein!! (2004)
- Olivier Messiaen's Turangalila Symphony (2008)
- Mason Bates's Alternative Energy (2016)
- Performances of complete concert operas, including Porgy and Bess, Candide and Don Giovanni.

== Conductor ==
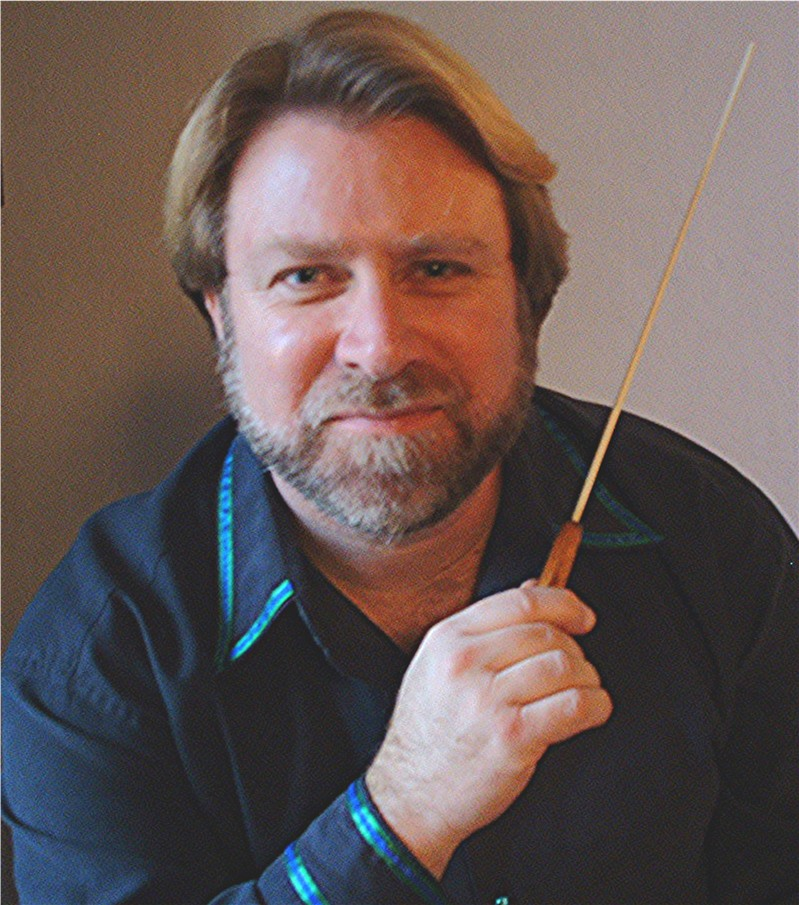
Maestro Eric Kujawsky

The music director and conductor of the Redwood Symphony is Dr. Eric Kujawsky, whose teachers included Samuel Krachmalnick, Paul Vermel and Andor Toth. He has performed with the Aspen Music Festival, several Bay Area orchestras and choruses, and with TheatreWorks in Palo Alto, Ram's Head Productions at Stanford, and the Cañada College Drama Department. Dr. Kujawsky made his Davies Symphony Hall debut with Redwood Symphony and the San Francisco Gay Men's Chorus in June 1996.

== Notable premieres ==
- Concerto for Orchestra ("Jubilee Games") - Oct. 11, 1991 - west coast premiere of Leonard Bernstein's last orchestral work
- Every Good Boy Deserves Favour - Oct. 11, 1992 - Bay Area premiere of a play with actors and orchestra by Tom Stoppard and André Previn
- Serenada Schizophrana - Oct. 2, 2005 - west coast premiere of Danny Elfman's first symphonic work
- Il Sogno - Oct. 8, 2006 - west coast premiere of Elvis Costello’s first orchestral work

== Recordings ==
- Stravinsky: Petrushka / The Soldier's Tale, 1992, Clarity Records

In their first CD, Kujawsky uses his own hybrid of Petrushka, combining the original 1911 version with the composer’s 1947 revision.

- Stravinsky: The Rite of Spring / Les Noces, 1995, Clarity Records

This is the only version of Les Noces available in English.

- Rodeo / Fanfare for the Common Man / An American in Paris, 1998, Redwood Recordings

A rare recording of the complete Rodeo ballet score.

- The Sorcerer's Apprentice / Pictures at an Exhibition / The Creation of the World, 1998, Redwood Recordings

Kujawsky’s Pictures includes some scoring revisions (including contrabass clarinet, extra brass in the finale), and transition from the descending eighth-note passage in Great Gate of Kiev rewritten by George Yefchak.

- Bartók: Concerto for Orchestra, 2000, Redwood Recordings

Both of Bartók’s endings are included. Includes First Rumanian Rhapsody by Enesco.

- Conga Line in Hell, 2002, Redwood Recordings

Includes World Premiere recording of Miguel del Aguila’s Conga-Line in Hell. Also Debussy's "Afternoon of a Faun," Copland's "El Salon Mexico" and Strauss' "Till Eulenspiegel".
