= Niagara Falls (composition) =

Niagara Falls for Symphonic Band (1997) by American composer Michael Daugherty, is his first composition for concert band. It is a 10-minute, single-movement work, that (through evocative timbres) explores the most visited waterfalls in the world. Niagara Falls was commissioned by the University of Michigan Bands in honor of its centennial, and dedicated to H. Robert Reynolds. The premiere was performed by the University of Michigan Symphony Band, under the direction of Reynolds, in October 1997, at Hill Auditorium in Ann Arbor, Michigan.

In 2000, the Cavaliers Drum and Bugle Corps performed a variation of Daugherty's Niagara Falls to a first-place tie with The Cadets Drum and Bugle Corps at the Drum Corps International World Championships in College Park, MD.

The composition served as the soundtrack for the hour-long PBS documentary special Niagara Falls, which first aired on September 11, 2006.

== See also ==
- List of compositions by Michael Daugherty
