= Grammy Award for Best Classical Compendium =

Music award category

- Awarded for: quality classical compendium music albums
- Country: United States
- Presented by: National Academy of Recording Arts and Sciences
- First award: 2013
- Currently held by: Gustavo Didamel (conductor); Dmitriy Lipay (producer) – Ortiz: Revolución Diamantina (2025)
- Website: grammy.com

The Grammy Award for Best Classical Compendium is an honor presented to recording artists for the best compendium album in the classical music genre at the Grammy Awards, a ceremony that was established in 1958 and which was originally called the Gramophone Awards. Honors in several categories are presented at the ceremony annually by the National Academy of Recording Arts and Sciences of the United States to "honor artistic achievement, technical proficiency and overall excellence in the recording industry, without regard to album sales or chart position".

This category was created for the 55th Grammy Awards. According to the category description guide it is intended "for an album collection containing at least 51 percent playing time of newly recorded material of performances (vocal or instrumental) by various soloist(s) and/or ensemble(s) involving a mixture of classical subgenres" It also states that these albums may not be entered in other classical album categories and classical crossover albums might be eligible.

The Grammy is awarded to the artist(s), album producer(s), engineer(s) and mixer(s) if they are responsible for over 51% of playing time of the album, if other than the artist(s).

== Recipients ==
Year^{[I]}	Recipient(s)	Work	Nominees (Performer(s) in parentheses)	Ref.
2013	Antoni Wit (conductor); Aleksandra Nagórko & Andrzej Sasin (producers, engineers/mixers)	Fonogrammi; Horn Concerto; The Awakening of Jacob; Anaklasis	John Schneider (producer) – Bitter Music (Partch); Emmanuelle Haïm (conductor), Daniel Zalay (producer) – Une Fête Baroque (Emmanuelle Haïm)	
2014	Christoph Eschenbach (conductor)	Hindemith: Violinkonzert; Symphonic Metamorphosis; Konzertmusik	Dima Slobodeniouk (conductor), Preben Iwan (producer) – Holmboe: Concerto (Dima Slobodeniouk); Maxim Rysanov (conductor), Manfred Eicher (producer) – Tabakova: String Paths (Maxim Rysanov)	
2015	John Schneider (producer); John Baffa (engineer/mixer)	Partch: Plectra & Percussion Dances	Jeffrey Skidmore (conductor), Colin Matthews (producer) – Britten to America (Jeffrey Skidmore); Manfred Eicher (producer) – Mieczyslaw Weinberg (Giedré Dirvanausakité, Daniil Grishin, Gidon Kremer & Daniil Trifonov); Mike Marshall (producer) – Mike Marshall & The Turtle Island Quartet (Mike Marshall & The Turtle Island Quartet); Paul Daniel (conductor), Andrew Walton (producer) – The Solent – Fifty Years of Music by Ralph Vaughan Williams (Paul Daniel)	
2016	Giancarlo Guerrero (conductor); Tim Handley (producer); Gary Call (engineer)	Paulus: Three Places Of Enlightenment; Veil Of Tears & Grand Concerto	Jim Ginsburg (producer) – As Dreams Fall Apart – The Golden Age of Jewish Stage and Film Music (1925–1955) (New Budapest Orpheum Society); George Manahan (conductor), Judith Sherman (producer) – Ask Your Mama (George Manahan & San Francisco Ballet Orchestra); Paul McCreesh (conductor), Nicholas Parker (producer) – Händel: l'Allegro, Il Penseroso Ed Il Moderato, 1740 (Paul McCreesh); Marina A. Ledin & Victor Ledin (producers) – Woman at the New Piano (Nadia Shpachenko)	
2017	Giancarlo Guerrero (conductor); Tim Handley (producer); Gary Call (engineer)	Daugherty: Tales of Hemingway; American Gothic; Once Upon a Castle	Tõnu Kaljuste (conductor), Manfred Eicher (producer) – Gesualdo (Tõnu Kaljuste); Martyn Brabbins (conductor), Andrew Walton (producer) – Vaughan Williams: Discoveries (Martyn Brabbins); Judith Farmer & Gernot Wolfgang (producers) – Wolfgang: Passing Through (Various Artists); Esa-Pekka Salonen (conductor), Frank Filipetti & Gail Zappa (producers) – Zappa: 200 Motels – The Suites (Esa-Pekka Salonen)	
2018	Giancarlo Guerrero (conductor); Tim Handley (producer) Gary Call (engineer)	Higdon: All Things Majestic, Viola Concerto & Oboe Concerto	Alexandre Tharaud (conductor); Cécile Lenoir (producer) – Barbara (Alexandre Tharaud & Various Artists); Reinbert de Leeuw (conductor); Guido Tichelman (producer) – Kurtág: Complete Works for Ensemble & Choir (Reinbert de Leeuw); Jordi Savall (conductor); Benjamin Bletton (producer) – Les Routes de l'Esclavage (Jordi Savall); Lucy Mauro (pianist and producer) – Mademoiselle: Première Audience – Unknown Music of Nadia Boulanger	
2019	JoAnn Falletta (conductor); Tim Handley (producer); Jonathan Allen (engineer)	Fuchs: Piano Concerto 'Spiritualist'; Poems of Life; Glacier; Rush	Nigel Short (producer) – Gold (The King's Singers); Simon Rattle (conductor); Christoph Franke (producer) – The John Adams Edition; Jerry Junkin (conductor); Donald J. McKinney (producer) – John Williams At The Movies; Peter Oundjian (conductor); Blanton Alspaugh (producer) – Vaughan Williams: Piano Concerto; Oboe Concerto; Serenade to Music; Flos Campi	
2020	Nadia Shpachenko (pianist); Marina A. Ledin & Victor Ledin (producers)	The Poetry of Places	John Morris Russell (conductor); Elaine Martone (producer) – American Originals 1918; Giancarlo Guerrero (conductor); Tim Handley (producer) – Leshnoff: Symphony No. 4 Heichalos, Guitar Concerto, Starburst; Paul Appleby (tenor) & Natalia Katyukova (pianist); Silas Brown & Harold Meltzer (producers) – Meltzer: Songs and Structures; Hannu Lintu (conductor); Laura Heikinheimo (producer) – Saariaho: True Fire; Trans; Ciel d'Hiver	
2021	Isabel Leonard (vocalist); Michael Tilson Thomas (conductor); Jack Vad (producer)	From The Diary Of Anne Frank & Meditations On Rilke	Mark Stone & Christianne Stotijn (performers); Thomas Adès (conductor); Nick Squire (producer) – Adès Conducts Adès; Clément Mao-Takacs (conductor); Hans Kipfer (producer) – Saariaho: Graal Théatre; Circle Map; Neiges; Vers Toi Qui Es Si Loin; José Serebrier (conductor); Jens Braun (producer) – Serebrier: Symphonic Bach Variations; Laments and Hallelujahs; Flute Concerto; Matt Haimovitz; Julian Wachner (conductor); Blanton Alspaugh (producer) – Woolf: Fire and Flood	
2022	Amy Andersson (conductor/producer); Mark Mattson & Lolita Ritmanis (producers)	Women Warriors: The Voices of Change	AGAVE & Reginald L. Mobley (artists); Geoffrey Silver (producer) – American Originals - A New World, A New Canon; Michael Tilson Thomas (conductor); Jack Vad (producer) – Berg: Violin Concerto, Seven Early Songs & Three Pieces for Orchestra; Timo Andres & Ian Rosenbaum (artists); Mike Tierney (producer) – Cerrone: The Arching Path; Chick Corea (artist/producer); Birnie Kirsh (producer) – Plays	
2023	Starr Parodi & Kitt Wakely (artists); Jeff Fair, Starr Parodi & Kitt Wakely (producers)	An Adoption Story	J.P. Jofre & Seunghee Lee (artists); Enrico Fagone (conductor); Jonathan Allen (producer) for Aspire; Yannick Nézet-Séguin (conductor); David Frost (producer) for A Concert for Ukraine; Voces8 (artists); Barnaby Smith & Christopher Tin (conductors); Sean Patrick Flahaven & Christopher Tin (producers) for The Lost Birds	
2024	Alex Brown, The Harlem Quartet, Imani Winds, Edward Perez, Neal Smith & A. B. Spellman (artists); Silas Brown & Mark Dover (producers)	Passion for Bach and Coltrane	Anne Akiko Meyers (artist); Gustaveo Dudamel (conductor); Dmitry Lepay (producer) for Fandango; Christopher Rountree (conductor); Lewis Pecasov (producer) for Julius Eastman, Vol. 3: If You're So Smart, Why Aren't You So Rich?; Peter Herresthal (artist); Tim Weiss (conductor); Hans Kipfer (producer) for Mazzoli: Dark with Excessive Bright; Chick Corea (artist); Chick Corea & Bernie Kirsh (producers) for Sardinia; Andy Akiho (artist); Andy Akiho & Sean Dixon (producers) for Sculptures; The Aaron Diehl Trio & The Knights (artists); Eric Jacobsen (conductor); Aaron Diehl & Eric Jacobson (producers) for Zodiac Suite	
2025	Gustavo Dudamel (conductor); Dmitriy Lipay (producer)	Ortiz: Revolución Diamantina	Andy Akiho & Imani Winds (artists); Andy Akiho, Sean Dixon & Mark Dover (producers) - BeLonging; Curtis Stewart (artist); James Blachley (conductor), Blanton Alspaugh (producer) - American Counterpoints; JoAnn Falletta (conductor); Bernd Gottinger (producer) - Foss: Symphony No. 1; Renaissance Concerto; Three American Pieces; Ode; Sangeeta Kaur, Omar Najmi, Hilá Plitmann, Robert Thies & Danaë Xanthe Vlasse (artists); Michael Shapiro (conductor); Jeff Atmajian, Emilio D. Miler, Hai Nguyen, Robert Thies, Danaë Xanthe Vlasse & Kitt Wakeley (producers) - Mythologies II	
2026	Gustavo Dudamel (conductor); Dmitriy Lipay (producer)	Ortiz: Yanga	Sandbox Percussion (artists); Jonathan Allen, Victor Caccese, Christopher Cerrone, Ian Rosenbaum, Terry Sweeney & Mike Tierney (producers) - Don't Look Down; Will Liverman (artist); Jonathan Estabrooks (producer) - The Dunbar/Moore Sessions, Vol. II; Janai Brugger, Isolde Fair, MB Gordy & Starr Parodi (artists); Nicholas Dodd (conductor); Jeff Fair, Starr Parodi & Kitt Wakely (producers) - Seven Seasons; Christina Sandsengen (artist); Shaun Drew & Christina Sandsengen (producers) - Tombeaux	
2027	TBA on 7 February 2027		Jon Batiste (artist/producer) - Black Mozart; Steven Blier, Joshua Blue, Will Liverman, Joseph Parrish, Alan Williams, Chaz'men Williams, Ali & Jorell Williams (artists); Justin Austin, Steven Blier & Jonathan Estabrooks (producers) - My Brother's Keeper; Sandbox Percussion (artists); David Alan Miller (conductor); Jonathan Allen, Silas Brown, Victor Caccese, Viet Cuong, Ian Rosenbaum & Terry Sweeney (producers) - Renewal: Music of Viet Cuong; Imani Winds (artists); Silas Brown, Mark Dover & Doron Schachter (producers) - Rise; SŌ Percussion (artists); Eric Cha-Beach, Matt Poirier, Josh Quillen, Adam Sliwinski & Jason Treuting (producers) - 25x25	

== See also ==
- Grammy Award for Best Classical Vocal Solo
- Grammy Award for Best Classical Instrumental Solo
- Grammy Award for Best Classical Contemporary Composition
