= John Schneider (guitarist) =

American classical guitarist (born 1950)

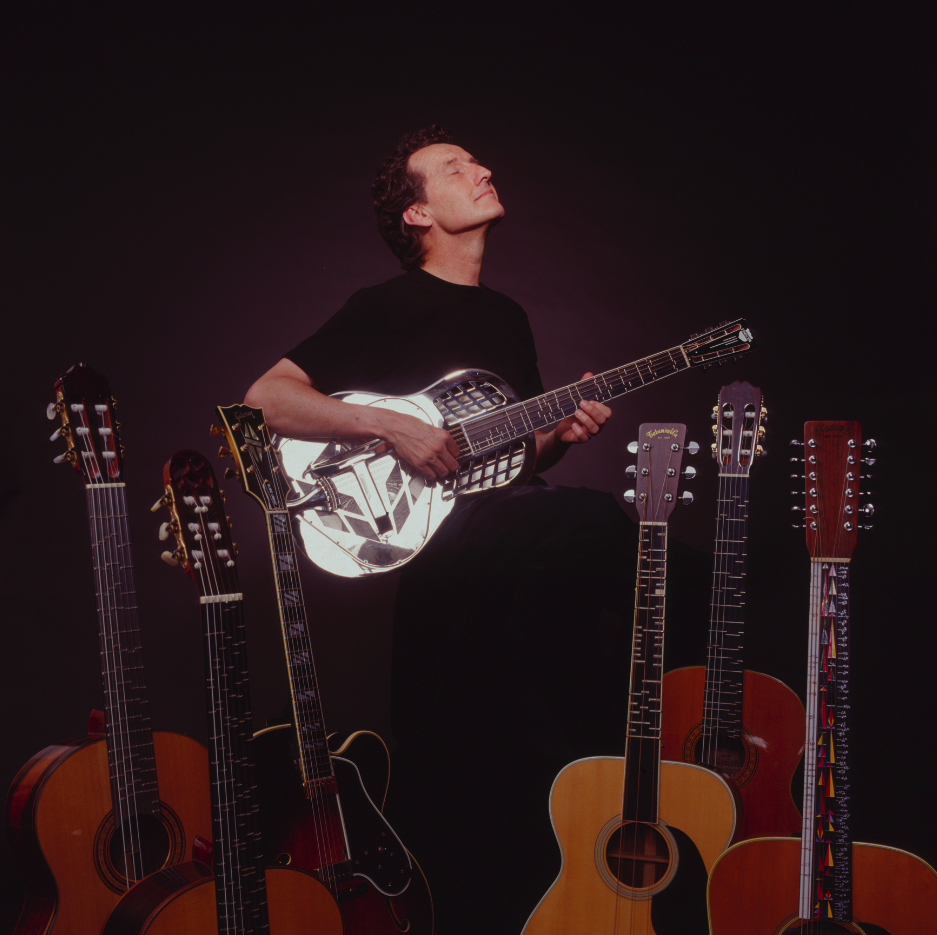
Schneider in 1992, next to his microtonal guitars

John Schneider (born 1950) is a Grammy award-winning and 4-time Grammy nominated American classical guitarist. He performs in just intonation and various well-temperaments, including Pythagorean tuning, including works by Lou Harrison, LaMonte Young, John Cage, and Harry Partch. He often arranges pieces for guitar and other instruments such as harp or percussion.

Schneider was a professor of music at Los Angeles Pierce College, [1980-2020], hosts the KPFK weekly radio program "Global Village", is founder of MicroFest (1997—), and founder of MicroFest Records.

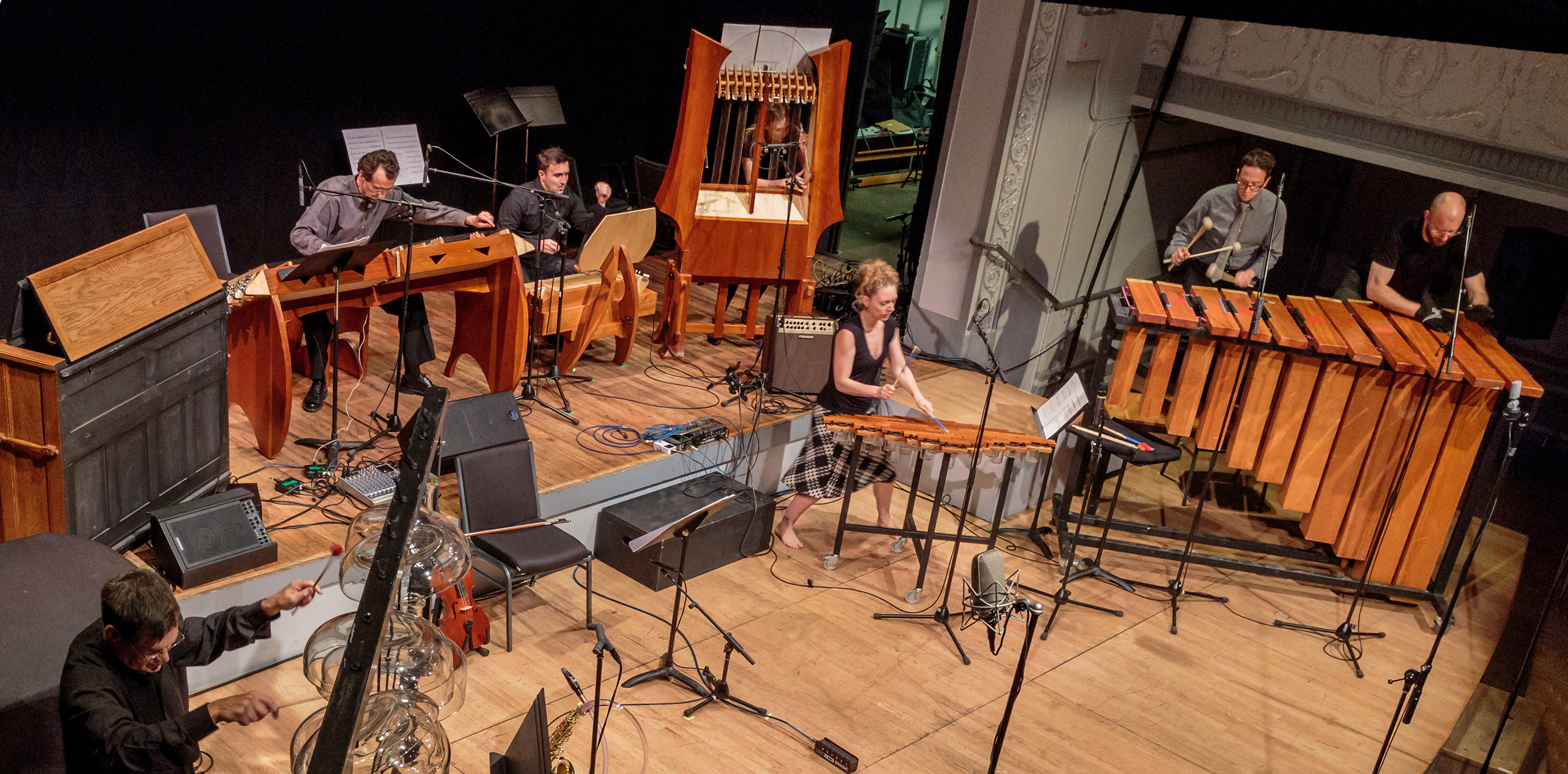
Schneider in a studio in 2016

He is also the founder and musical director of the PARTCH Ensemble, dedicated to the music of Harry Partch. With this ensemble, he won the 2014 Grammy Award for Best Classical Compendium for Partch: Plectra & Percussion Dances (Bridge Records, 2014). He owns two dozen copies of different instruments designed by Harry Partch as well as a collection of guitars with microtonal fretboards.

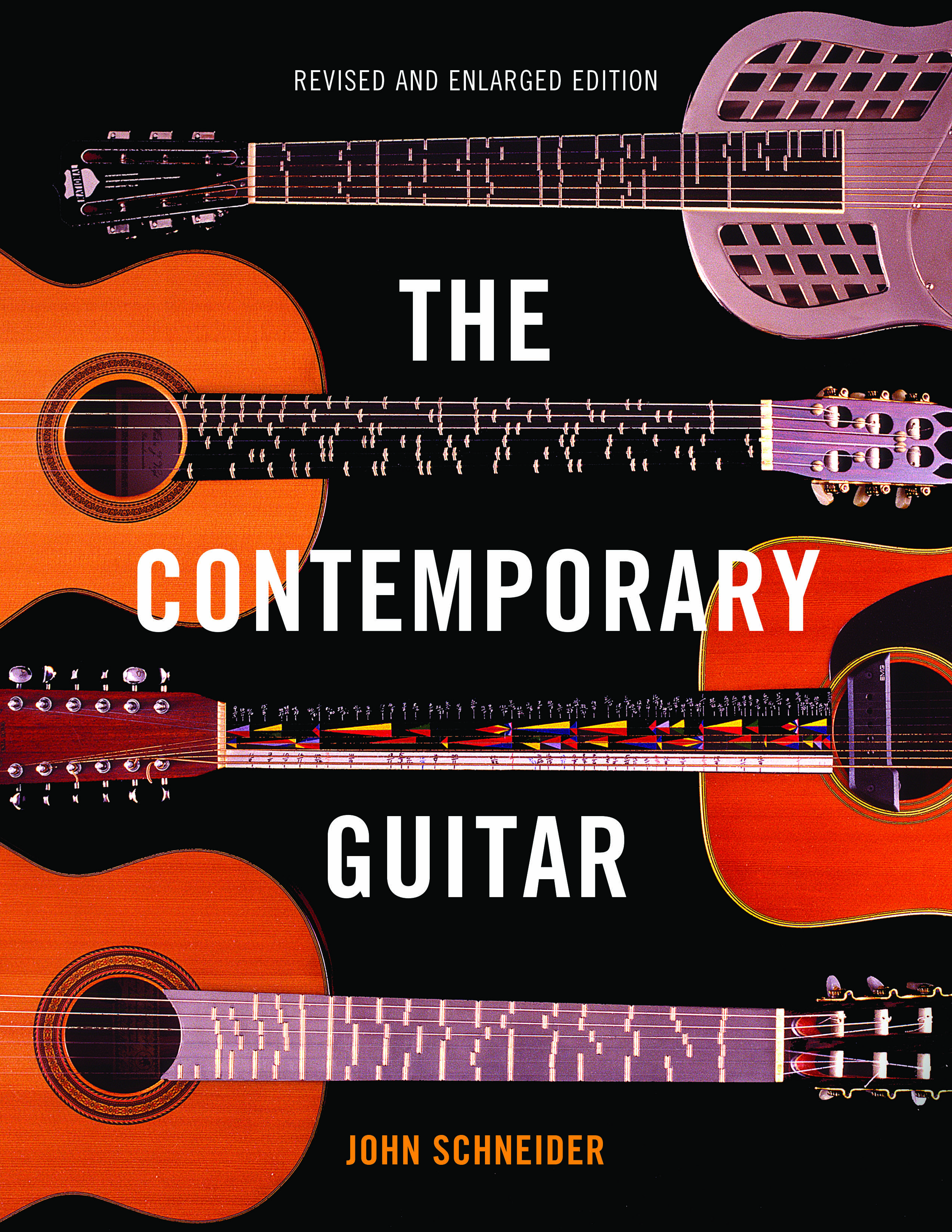
Cover of the 2015 revised version The Contemporary Guitar

In 2015, he published a revised and enlarged edition of his book The Contemporary Guitar, which first appeared in 1985.

== Bibliography ==
- “Global Guitar Music of Lou Harrison.” Mikrotöne: Small is Beautiful V, edited by Á. Castilla-Ávila (Salzburg: Mackinverlag, 2024), 125–134.
- “The Well-Tuned Guitar.” 21st Century Guitar: Evolutions & Augmentations, edited by Richard Perks & John McGrath (New York: Bloomsbury Academic, 2023), 9-23.
- “Essay: Ben Johnston.” Interviews with American Composers: Barney Childs in Conversation, edited by Virginia Anderson (Chicago: University of Illinois Press, 2022), 167–169.
- HARRY PARTCH, 1942, MicroFest Records, 2022 [Grammy® Nominated: Best Album Notes]
- The Contemporary Guitar, Revised & Enlarged Edition. Rowman & Littlefield Publishers, 2015
- “Magnus Andersson: Extreme Guitarist—Part 1,” Soundboard, Vol. 41, No.4 (2016)
- “Magnus Andersson: Extreme Guitarist—Part 2,” Soundboard, Vol. 42, No.1 (2016)
- “The Microtonal Guitars of Harry Partch,” Soundboard Scholar #1, (2015).
- “Tampering with Nature: Playing in Unequal Temperaments,“ & “Pure Magic: Composing & Performing in Just Intonation,” 1001 Microtones. Neumünster: Bockel-Verlag, 2014.
- “Partch’s Guitars,” Soundboard Scholar #1, (2015)
- “Partch: Re-Genesis of a Music,” Kongressbericht “Mikrotonalität: Praxis & Utopie,” Stuttgart 2011. Mainz: Schott Verlag, 2014.
- “Organ Transplants: Recreating Partch’s Chromelodeons,” Reed Organ Society Quarterly 2012, Vol. XXXI, No. 2.
- “Adam del Monte: Classical Duende,” Soundboard, Vol. XXXVII, No.3, (2011)
- “Tim Brady: Electric,” Soundboard Vol XXXVI, No.3 (2010); pp. 71–76.
- “Ben Johnston at Eighty,” Schneider, J. (ed.). 1/1: The Journal of the Just Intonation Network 12, no. 3 (2007).
- “The Persian Passion of Lily Afshar,” Classical Guitar [UK]. Vol. 23, No.7 (March, 2005); pp. 16–19.
- “Just Lou Harrison,” Guitar Review #128, (New York, 2004), pp. 13–23.
- “Just Guitar,” Guitart International #6, April/June 2004; pp. 42–50.
- “Lou Harrison’s Guitars,” Classical Guitar [UK]. Vol. 21, No.10 (June, 2003); pp. 20–23.
- “Radio Soundboard (1978–1997),” Soundboard Magazine, Volume XXVI, 1999 No.2
- “Adam del Monte: Duende in Bach and Albeniz,” Soundboard, Vol. XXV, No.4 (1997)
- “Fine Tuning,” ACOUSTIC GUITAR. May/June, No.24 (1994); pp. 30–38.
- “Bringing Back Barstow,” GUITAR REVIEW. No.95 (Winter 1993); pp. 1–14.
- “A History of the JUST GUITAR,” 1/1. Vol. VII, No.3 (1992); pp. 11–15.
- “David Starobin at Forty,” GUITAR REVIEW No. 90, Summer 1992: pp. 18–22.
- “TOD MACHOVER: Hypercomposer,” GUITAR REVIEW No. 86, Summer 1991.
- “The Divine Giuliani,” Gendai Guitar [Tokyo] Winter 1990.
- “The Divine Giuliani,” Soundboard. Vol. XVI, No.3 (1989); pp. 38–48.
- “Pierre Boulez: a conversation,” GUITAR REVIEW No. 75, 1988: pp. 28–31.
- “Peter Maxwell Davies: a conversation,” GUITAR REVIEW No. 64, 1985.
- “Alois Hába,” Soundboard. Vol. XII, No.2 (1985); pp. 154–158.
- “Julian Carrillo,” Soundboard. Vol. XII, No.1 (1985); pp. 36–39.
- “Igor Stravinsky,” Soundboard. Vol. XI, No.2 (1984); pp. 152–157.
- “SOUNDBOARD ON THE AIR,” Soundboard. Vol. XI, No.1 (1984); pp. 36–39.
- “The Guitar Works of Ned Rorem,” Soundboard. Vol. XI, No.1 (1984); pp. 28–32.
- “Where do you find the Music?,” Soundboard. Vol. X, No.4 (1983); pp. 376–79.
- “Harry Partch,” Soundboard. Vol. X, No.3 (1983); pp. 260–264.
- “Bruno Bartolozzi,” Soundboard. Vol. X, No.2 (1983); pp. 138–41.
- “Peter Maxwell Davies,” Soundboard. Vol. X, No.1 (1983); pp. 43–45.
- “Guitar & Tape: New Horizons,” ASTA National Guitar Symposium 1981. New Jersey: American String Teacher's Ass. 1982.
- “The Microtonal Guitar,” [Parts I–V] Guitar & Lute : Nos. 10 –24, (1981–82).
- “A Conversation with Ernst Krenek,” Soundboard. Vol. VIII, No.4 (1981); pp. 262–65.
- “Toru Takemitsu,” Soundboard. Vol. VIII, No.3 (1981); pp. 169–71.
- “Goffredo Petrassi,” Soundboard. Vol. VIII, No.2 (1981); pp. 92–94.
- “Hans Werner Henze,” Soundboard. Vol. VII, No.4 (1980); pp. 173–77.
- “20th Century Guitar Music,” Soundboard. Vol. VII, No.4 (1980); pp. 175–76.
- “Pierre Boulez,” Soundboard. Vol. VII, No.3 (1980); pp. 126–7.
- “20th Century Guitar: The 2nd Golden Age,” Guitar & Lute : Nos. 10 & 12, (1979–1980).
- “The Contemporary Guitar,” Soundboard. Vol. VII, No.2 (1980); p. 69.
- “Conversation with Julian Bream,” Soundboard Vol. VII, No.1(1979); pp. 108–111.
- “The Well–Tempered Guitar,” Soundboard Vol. V, No.4 (1978); pp. 108–111.
- “The Rational Method of Tone Production,” ASTA National Guitar Symposium 1977. New Jersey: American String Teacher's Ass. 1978.
- “New Instruments Through Frequency Division,” Contact. [London] No.15 (1976).

== Discography ==
- SONIC VOYAGE: New Music for Guitar. El Maestro Records, 1981.
- Lou Harrison: Music for Guitar & Percussion Etcetera [Holland] KTC 1071, 1991.
- JUST WEST COAST : Microtonal Music for Guitar & Harp, Bridge Records BCD 9041, 1993.[chosen "CD of the Year" by CD Review in 1994 & Fanfare's “Classical Hall of Fame” 2003]
- Sasha Matson : RANGE OF LIGHT, NEW ALBION RECORDS NA 092, 1997.
- John Cage • LOU HARRISON • HARRY PARTCH, Cambria Records - CAMBRIA 8806, 2000. [ASCAP Special Achievement Award]
- JUST GUITARS : Music by Harrison, Partch, Riley & Scholtz & Schneider, Bridge Records Bridge 9132, 2003.
- Johnny Reinhard : ODYSSEUS, Pitch Records P-2002-1, 2004.
- MUSIC OF CARLOS CHAVEZ (vol.3) Southwest Chamber Music, Cambria Records, (2005). Grammy nominations for “Best Classical Album” & “Best Small Ensemble” & Latin Grammy nomination for “Best Classical Album”
- MUSIC OF Carlos Chavez (vol.4) Southwest Chamber Music - solo guitar works + string quartets Cambria Records, (2006). Latin Grammy nomination for “Best Classical Album”
- EAR GARDENS : American Festival of Microtonal Music. Music of Reinhard, Riley, Corner & Cage Pitch Records P-200209, 2006.
- ENCLOSURE 8 : Harry Partch. Castor & Pollux w/dancers with Partch, Innova Records DVD, 2007.
- Russel Steinberg & Daniel Pearl: "Stories from My Favorite Planet", www.DanielPearl.org, 2007.
- POR GITARO: Lou Harrison's Suites for Tuned Guitars, Mode Records, mode 195, 2008
- JOHN CAGE: 45' For A Speaker, Tiger Barb Records, 2008.
- William Kraft: Encounters, Cambria Records 1191, 2009. Latin Grammy nomination for “Best Classical Album”
- Harry Partch: Bitter Music – Bridge Records 9349 A/B/C, 2011. Grammy® Award nomination for “Best Classical Compendium”
- COLD BLUE TWO: Polansky “Eskimo Lullaby”, Cold Blue Music CB0036, 2012
- Ben Johnston: Ruminations - Setting of Rumi & Billie Holiday, MicroFest Records M•5, 2014
- Harry Partch: Plectra & Percussion Dances - Bridge Records 9432, 2014. Grammy® Award winner for "Best Classical Compendium" & Grammy® Award nomination for "Best Chamber Music Performance"
- JUST STRINGS: John Luther Adams & Lou Harrison - MicroFest Records, M•F 7, 2015
- BILL ALVES : Guitars & Gamelan - MicroFest Records, M•F 8, 2015
- HOPSCOTCH : The Industry Records, 2017 (voiceover)
- COLOR THEORY : Prism Sax Quartet/Partch/So Percussion - XAS 102, 2017
- Tom Johnson: PLUCKING - MicroFest Records, M•F 9, 2017
- JUST NATIONAL GUITAR : music of Lou Harrison, Terry Riley, et al. MicroFest Records M•F 12, 2019
- Harry Partch: SONATA DEMENTIA - Bridge Records 9525, 2019
- HARRY PARTCH, 1942 - MicroFest Records M•F 20, 2022. Grammy® Award nomination for Best Program Notes
