= Fire and Blood (Daugherty) =

Concerto by Michael Daugherty

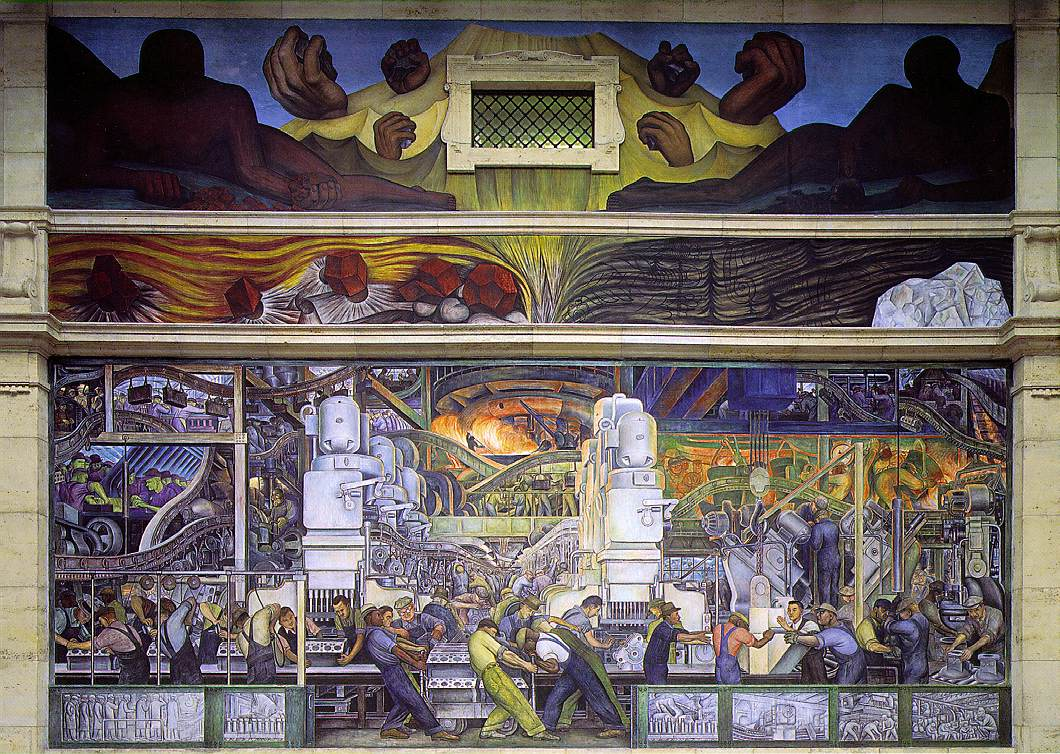
Detroit Industry, North Wall, 1932-33. Detroit Institute of Arts.

Fire and Blood for solo violin and orchestra by composer Michael Daugherty is a 25-minute concerto inspired by Diego Rivera's Detroit Industry Murals and Frida Kahlo's paintings done in Detroit. It was commissioned by the Detroit Symphony Orchestra during Michael Daugherty's time as composer in residence (1999–2003).

== Instrumentation ==
Solo violin; 2 flutes, 2 oboes, 2 clarinets in B♭, 2 bassoons; 2 or 4 horns, 2 trumpets in C; 5 timpani, 2 percussion (I=marimba/glockenspiel/suspended cymbal/piccolo triangle/medium maracas/guiro/small brake drum/large whip; II=marimba/2 crotales/small tam-tam/triangle/large maracas/medium and large brake drums/ratchet); harp; strings

== Movements ==
The piece has three movements:

1. Volcano
2. River Rouge
3. Assembly Line

== Premiere ==
The world premiere performance took place May 3, 2003, at Symphony Hall, Detroit, Michigan; with Ida Kavafian on violin, accompanied by Detroit Symphony Orchestra, under the baton of Neeme Järvi.

== Discography ==
Naxos: Fire and Blood / MotorCity Triptych / Raise the Roof (Kavafian, B. Jones, Detroit Symphony, N. Jarvi)
