= Dead Elvis (composition) =

1993 composition by Michael Daugherty

Dead Elvis, also known as Develvis for Solo Bassoon and Chamber Ensemble (1993) by American composer Michael Daugherty, is a 10-minute, single-movement work inspired by the King of Rock-n-Roll, Elvis Presley. Dead Elvis was commissioned by bassoonist Charles (Chuck) Ullery and The Grand Tetons Festival, and Richard Pittman/Boston Musica Viva. The Chamber Ensemble instrumentation calls for solo bassoon, E flat clarinet, trumpet, bass trombone, violin, contrabass, and percussion. The premiere was performed by The Grand Tetons Chamber Players, Michael Daugherty conducting and Charles Ullery as soloist, in July 1993. The piece also suggests that the bassoon soloist dress as the King.

== Discography ==
1. American Icons - Michael Daugherty: Dead Elvis/Flamingo/Jackie's Song/Le Tombeau de Liberace/Motown Metal/Snap!/What's That Spell?

London Sinfonietta, David Zinman, Conductor; London Sinfonietta, Markus Stenz, Paul Crossley, piano; Dogs of Desire, David Alan Miller; London Sinfonietta, Michael Daugherty, Christopher van Kampen, cello. London/Decca Argo 458-145-2.

2. Absolute Mix - Michael Daugherty: Dead Elvis/Sing Sing: J. Edgar Hoover. Absolute Ensemble, Kristjan Jarvi.
