= Giancarlo Guerrero =

Nicaraguan conductor (born 1969)

- Born: March 14, 1969 (age 57); Managua, Nicaragua
- Education: Baylor University; Northwestern University
- Occupation: Conductor
- Spouse: Shirley Guerrero
- Children: 2 daughters

Giancarlo Guerrero (born March 14, 1969) is a Nicaraguan orchestra conductor, raised in Costa Rica. He is currently music director of the Sarasota Orchestra, and artistic director and principal conductor of the Grant Park Music Festival. Guerrero was formerly music director of the Wrocław Philharmonic at the National Forum of Music, principal guest conductor of the Gulbenkian Orchestra, and music director of the Nashville Symphony.

== Biography ==
Guerrero was born in Managua, Nicaragua. He emigrated to Costa Rica, where he joined the Costa Rica Youth Symphony and the Costa Rican National Symphony Orchestra. He graduated from Baylor University, where he earned a bachelor's degree in 1991, and he earned a master's degree from Northwestern University.

Guerrero was music director of the Táchira Symphony Orchestra in Venezuela. From 1999 to 2004, he was the associate conductor of the Minnesota Orchestra, where he made his subscription debut in March 2000 leading the world premiere of John Corigliano's Phantasmagoria on the Ghosts of Versailles. He was the music director of the Eugene Symphony from 2001 to 2008. In June 2004, Guerrero was awarded the Helen M. Thompson Award by the American Symphony Orchestra League, which recognizes outstanding achievement among young conductors nationwide.

Guerrero became the seventh music director of the Nashville Symphony at the beginning of its 2009–2010 season. He has also served as principal guest conductor of the Gulbenkian Orchestra in Lisbon. From 2011 to 2016, he was the principal guest conductor of The Cleveland Orchestra Miami Residency. Guerrero concluded his tenure as music director of the Nashville Symphony at the close of the 2024–2025 season, and subsequently held the title of music director laureate for the 2025–2026 season.

An advocate of new music and contemporary composers, Guerrero has collaborated with and championed the works of American composers, including John Adams, John Corigliano, Osvaldo Golijov, Roberto Sierra, Jennifer Higdon, Aaron Jay Kernis, Michael Daugherty, and Roberto Sierra. His first recording with the Nashville Symphony, on Naxos, of Michael Daugherty's Metropolis Symphony and Deux Ex Machina, won three 2011 Grammy Awards, including the category of Best Orchestral Performance. In 2018, Guerrero won his sixth GRAMMY Award for a recording of music by Jennifer Higdon.

In 2017, he became music director of the Wrocław Philharmonic at the National Forum of Music. He concluded his NFM Wrocław Philharmonic tenure at the close of the 2023–2024 season.

In January 2024, Guerrero first guest-conducted the Sarasota Orchestra. In August 2024, the Sarasota Orchestra announced the appointment of Guerrero as its next music director, effective with the 2025–2026 season, with an initial contract of five seasons. He held the title of music director-designate in the 2024–2025 season.

In July 2024, Guerrero first guest-conducted at the Grant Park Music Festival. In October 2024, the Grant Park Music Festival announced the appointment of Guerrero as its next artistic director and principal conductor, with immediate effect, with an initial contract of three seasons. On 8 February 2026, Guerrero conducted a bespoke string orchestra in the Super Bowl LX halftime show in an arrangement of Bad Bunny's song 'Monaco', at the invitation of Bad Bunny.

Guerrero resides in Brentwood, Tennessee, a suburb of Nashville, with his wife, Shirley, and their two daughters.

== Awards ==
Guerrero has won six Grammy Awards in his career:

- 2011: Grammy Award for Best Orchestral Performance for Daugherty: Metropolis Symphony; Deus Ex Machina
- 2012: Grammy Award for Best Classical Instrumental Solo for Schwantner: Concerto for Percussion & Orchestra (with the Nashville Symphony Orchestra and soloist Christopher Lamb)
- 2015: Grammy Award for Best Classical Compendium for Paulus: Three Places Of Enlightenment; Veil Of Tears & Grand Concerto (with the Nashville Symphony Orchestra)
- 2016: Grammy Award for Best Classical Compendium and Grammy Award for Best Classical Instrumental Solo for Daugherty: Tales of Hemingway (with the Nashville Symphony Orchestra and soloist Zuill Bailey)
- 2017: Grammy Award for Best Classical Compendium for Higdon: All Things Majestic (with the Nashville Symphony Orchestra)
- 2020: Grammy Award for Best Contemporary Classical Composition for Rouse: Symphony No. 5 (with the Nashville Symphony Orchestra)

Cultural offices
Preceded by Miguel Harth-Bedoya	Music Director, Eugene Symphony; 2002–2009	Succeeded by Danail Rachev
Preceded by Kenneth Schermerhorn	Music Director, Nashville Symphony; 2009–2025	Succeeded by Leonard Slatkin
Preceded by Benjamin Shwartz	Music Director, NFM Wrocław Philharmonic; 2017–2024	Succeeded by Christoph Eschenbach
Preceded by Carlos Kalmar	Artistic Director and Principal Conductor, Grant Park Music Festival; 2024–present	Succeeded by incumbent
Preceded by Bramwell Tovey	Music Director, Sarasota Orchestra; 2025–present	Succeeded by incumbent
