= Fallingwater (composition) =

Concerto by Michael Daugherty

- by Michael Daugherty
- Composed: 2013
- Movements: 4

Premiere
- Date: 20 November 2013

Fallingwater is a 2013 concerto for solo violin and string orchestra by the American composer Michael Daugherty, inspired by four of Frank Lloyd Wright's buildings: Taliesin, Fallingwater, Unity Temple and the Guggenheim Museum. The work was commissioned by the director of the New Century Chamber Orchestra, Nadja Salerno-Sonnenberg, who gave the premiere on November 20, 2013.

== Movements ==
The concerto has four movements:

1. Nightrain
2. On the Level
3. Prairie Psalm
4. Ahead of the Curve

== Discography ==
- From A to Z: 21st Century Concertos. Assad / Bolcom / Daugherty / Zwilich. NSS Music, November 2013.
