= Lin Emery =

American artist (1926–2021)

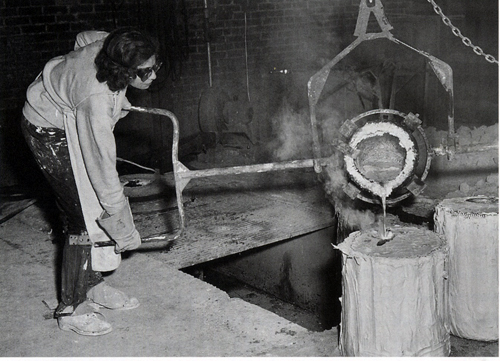
- Lin Emery pouring bronze at the Orleans Workshop, a foundry and ceramic facility that she co-founded in 1963
- Born: Lenore Emery; May 20, 1926; New York City, United States
- Died: March 11, 2021 (aged 94); New Orleans, Louisiana
- Known for: kinetic sculpture, public art
- Notable work: Morrison Memorial, 1966, fountain for the New Orleans Civic Center. Wave, 1985, New Orleans Museum of Art.
- Movement: Kinetic art, Constructivism (art), Modern sculpture

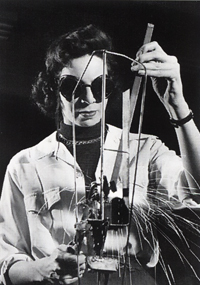
Lin Emery welding at the New York Sculpture Centre in 1954

Lenore Emery (May 20, 1926 – March 11, 2021) was an American visual artist based in New Orleans. She is primarily known for her large-scale wind-powered kinetic sculpture and public artworks that are inspired by the forces of nature. Since 1972, all of her art has been kinetic and activated by water, magnets, motors, and wind. In 1956, she was a charter member of the Orleans Gallery, located at 527 Royal Street, which was the city's first collective artist-run and operated contemporary art space.

== Early life and education ==
Emery's father was Hungarian and died when she was three years old. Although the family home was based in Larchmont, New York, Lin's mother spent the winter season in Florida. This meant shuttling between a fall and springtime school in suburban New York and a winter school in Florida. Between 1935 and 1942, her early childhood education included the Edgewood Rudolf Steiner School, Rye Country Day School, Palm Beach private school, West Palm Beach public school and Ursuline Convent School. She received private lessons in drawing, French, Latin and German. By the age of sixteen, Emery legally changed her first name from "Leonor" to "Lin" and entered college. Her university-level studies between 1942 and 1945 took place at Columbia University, Syracuse University, University of Mexico, the Goodman School of Drama in Chicago, and University of Chicago. After that point she worked for Chicago Sun-Times newspaper. In 1945 she moved to New Orleans and worked as fashion copy writer.

== Artistic training ==
Emery's studies moved overseas to Paris between 1947 and 1950 at Cours de la Civilisation Francaise at the Sorbonne. She also attended evening figure drawing sessions at la Grande Chaumière in the Montparnasse arts district. Around this time she visited New Mexico and exhibited paintings at Harwood Museum, Taos. She returned to Paris in 1949 and studied sculpture in the studio of Ossip Zadkine. Afterward she returned to New Orleans and began working in clay and plaster. From 1951 to 1952 she is enrolled at the New York Sculpture Center, first working in clay and pewter along with classmates Dorothy Dehner and Louise Nevelson. She then learned welding and casting, and exhibited with Herbert Ferver, David Hare, Seymour Lipton and David Smith. Settling back into New Orleans in 1953, she turned her French Quarter apartment into a fully equipped metal working studio.

== Career in the visual arts ==
Lin Emery's early work was figurative. She was commissioned to portray life sized religious figures for many churches in Louisiana and the South. Gradually the inner supports of the figures (welded armatures) were more interesting to her than the representational surfaces, and she created a series of abstract welded sculptures. These were successful in New Orleans and New York, and encouraged her to explore further. Being free in New Orleans to develop in new ways, she began to experiment with motion. First she used water as the motive force, and her "aquamobiles" gained recognition across America. Twenty foot bronze aquamobiles were commissioned in Tulsa, Oklahoma City, New Orleans, New York, and smaller water-propelled works were exhibited in museums throughout the South. Later she used magnets to create motion, and finally chose wind as a more dependable source. Wind driven sculptures for public spaces were commissioned throughout the United States and the Far East.

Between 1955 and 1970, Emery's work entered into wide national circulation. A 1955 feature in Art in America led to a traveling show in American museums in the South. During this period, the evolution of Emery's practice expanded to include magnets and Aquamobiles, which were inspired while she washed a spoon doing the dishes. She also exhibited at the Pennsylvania Academy of Fine Arts, as well as venues in Hong Kong and Manila. During this time she also shared skills with other artists, and received her first major public fountain commissions, including the 1966 Morrison Memorial fountain at the New Orleans Civic Center. From 1969 to 1970, she taught at Tulane University School of Architecture, and received private instruction in the engineering department's water lab and machine shop.

Emery organized the 1976 International Sculpture Conference in New Orleans, which included lectures by Isamu Noguchi, Yaacov Agam, Hilton Kramer, Beverly Pepper, Irving Sandler, Seymour Lipton and George Sugarman. In 1984, she was commissioned by the World's Fair. Lin Emery is represented by the Arthur Roger Gallery.

== Theft of Lin Emery sculpture ==
In 2010, thieves broke into Emery's studio, and "...stole some tools, copper pipe, and a huge 13-segment sculpture called the Morrison Aquamobile." It is likely that the thieves stole the materials and the sculpture to sell for scrap metal.

== Selected honors and awards ==
2012 Opus Award, Ogden Museum of Southern Art, New Orleans, LA
2005 S. Simon Sculpture Award, National Academy Museum, NY
2004 Honorary Doctorate, Loyola University of the South
2001 Governor's Arts Award, Louisiana
1998 Osaka Prefecture, Japan: Grand Prize for Public Sculpture, Osaka, Japan
1990 Lazlo Aranyi Award of Honor for Public Art
1988 Distinguished Louisiana Artist Award, N.O.C.C.A., New Orleans, LA
1984 Louisiana Women of Achievement Award
1983 National Endowment for the Arts "Interarts" Grant
1980 Mayor's Award for Achievement in the Arts, New Orleans, LA

== Museum retrospectives ==
2018 Louisiana Art and Science Museum, LA
2017 Hilliard University Art Museum, LA
1996 New Orleans Museum of Art, LA
2010 Leepa-Rattner Museum of Art, FL
