= UFO (Daugherty) =

Composition by Michael Daugherty

UFO (for solo percussion and orchestra (1999), and for solo percussion and symphonic band (2000)) is a composition written by American composer Michael Daugherty for percussionist Evelyn Glennie.

The world of American popular culture inspires much of Daugherty's music – in the present case, the unidentified flying objects that have been an obsession in American popular culture since 1947 (Scott 2003, 35).

== History ==
UFO for solo percussion and orchestra was commissioned by the National Symphony Orchestra through a grant from the John and June Hechinger Commissioning Fund. It was first performed by Evelyn Glennie and the National Symphony Orchestra conducted by Leonard Slatkin at the Kennedy Center, Washington D.C. on April 10, 1999. In 2000, on a commission from Michigan State University, the University of Michigan, Baylor University, the Arizona State University, and the University of North Texas, Daugherty adapted the orchestral part for symphonic band. This version was premiered by the Michigan State University Symphony Band conducted by John Whitwell, with solo percussionist Allison Shaw, on October 7, 2000, at Michigan State University, East Lansing, Michigan (Scott 2003, 41), and by Evelyn Glennie, solo percussion and the North Texas Wind Symphony conducted by Eugene Migliaro Corporon on April 19, 2001, in Denton, Texas.

== Instrumentation ==
In five movements with a total duration of about 40 minutes, the concerto is scored for piccolo, 2 flutes, 2 oboes, English horn, B♭ clarinet, E♭ clarinet, bass clarinet, 2 bassoons, contrabassoon, 4 horns, 4 trumpets, 3 trombones, tuba, and strings.

The symphonic band version is scored for piccolo, 4 flutes, 2 oboes, English horn, E♭ clarinet, 4 B♭ clarinets, bass clarinet, 2 bassoons, contrabassoon, soprano, alto, tenor, and baritone saxophones, 4 horns, 4 trumpets, 2 trombones, bass trombone, 3 euphoniums, 2 tubas, and contrabass.

== Movements ==
The concerto has five movements:

1. Traveling Music
2. Unidentified
3. Flying
4. ???
5. Objects

== Discography ==
1. American Classics - Michael Daugherty: Philadelphia Stories/UFO for solo percussion and orchestra
  Evelyn Glennie - solo percussion
  Colorado Symphony Orchestra, Marin Alsop, conductor
2. UFO - Music of Michael Daugherty: Desi/Motown Metal/Niagara Falls/Red Cape Tango/UFO for solo percussion and symphony band
  Evelyn Glennie - solo percussion
  North Texas Wind Symphony, Eugene Migliaro Corporon, conductor
