= Bells for Stokowski =

Bells for Stokowski for Orchestra and for Symphonic Band by American composer Michael Daugherty, is a 14-minute, single-movement tribute to one of the most prominent 20th-century conductors, Leopold Stokowski. Bells for Stokowski for Orchestra (2001) stands alone as a concert piece; however, it is also the last movement of the three-movement work, Philadelphia Stories. (Note: In the liner notes for Naxos 8.559165, Daugherty refers to Philadelphia Stories as "...my third symphony.") Philadelphia Stories was commissioned by the Philadelphia Orchestra in celebration of the orchestra's centennial under the direction of Wolfgang Sawallisch. The premiere was performed by the Philadelphia Orchestra at the Academy of Music in Philadelphia, under the direction of David Zinman, in November 2001.

A consortium, including universities from several states, commissioned the piece. The premiere was performed by the University of Michigan Symphony Band at the Michigan Theater in Ann Arbor, Michigan, under the direction of Michael Haithcock, on October 2, 2002. One year later, it was performed by the Arizona State University Wind Ensemble, conducted by Gary Hill, at the College Band Directors National Association (CBDNA) National Conference in Minneapolis, Minnesota, on March 27, 2003. It was also performed at the Midwest Band and Orchestra Clinic on December 18, 2003, by the Indiana University Wind Ensemble conducted by Ray Cramer.

== Discography ==
- Naxos American Classics - Michael Daugherty: Philadelphia Stories/UFO for Solo Percussion and Orchestra (Evelyn Glennie, percussion; Colorado Symphony Orchestra, Marin Alsop, conductor)
- Raise the Roof - Michael Daugherty: Asclepius/Raise the Roof/Bells for Stokowski/Brooklyn Bridge/Niagara Falls (University of Michigan Symphony Band; Michael Haithcock, conductor)
- Bells for Stokowski (University of Texas Wind Ensemble; Jerry Junkin, conductor)
