= This Land Sings: Inspired by the Life and Times of Woody Guthrie =

2016 song cycle by Michael Daugherty

This Land Sings: Inspired by the Life and Times of Woody Guthrie is a song cycle for soprano singer, baritone singer and chamber ensemble composed in 2016 by the GRAMMY Award-winning American composer Michael Daugherty. The work is an original musical tribute by Michael Daugherty to the singer-songwriter and political activist Woody Guthrie (1912–1967).

Before composing this work, Daugherty pursued research at the Woody Guthrie Center in Tulsa, Oklahoma and drove his car around the backroads of Texas and Oklahoma while listening to recordings of Woody Guthrie. Daugherty decided to organize his composition into 17 vocal and instrumental numbers like a radio broadcast on the Grand Ole Opry. Daugherty stated that his desire was to give "haunting expression, ironic with and contemporary relevance to the political, social and environmental themes from Woody Guthrie's era".

== Instrumentation ==
This Land Sings: Inspired by the Life and Times of Woody Guthrie is scored for soprano singer, baritone singer and a chamber ensemble composed of B-flat clarinet/bass clarinet, bassoon, C trumpet, trombone, percussion (one player), violin, contrabass, optional harmonica and optional radio announcer.

== Origin and performance history ==
The composition was commissioned by Tulsa Camerata and sponsored in part by a grant from the George Kaiser Family Foundation. The world premiere was given by Tulsa Camerata conducted by Michael Daugherty with soprano Annika Socolofsky, baritone John Daugherty (no relation to the composer) and Jason Heilman, optional radio announcer, at the Philbrook Museum of Art in Tulsa, Oklahoma on April 22, 2016.

== Recording ==
This Land Sings: Inspired by the Life and Times of Woody Guthrie was released on the Naxos label in 2020, featuring soprano Annika Socolofsky, baritone John Daugherty and the Albany Symphony Orchestra's new music ensemble Dogs of Desire, under the baton of David Alan Miller.

== Movements ==
This Land Sings: Inspired by the Life and Times of Woody Guthrie is divided into 17 movements. The composer's published score includes notes detailing the work's inspiration and a description of each movement.

=== I. Overture ===
Scored for ensemble alone, this movement incorporates fragments of the old American folk hymn "O My Loving Brother", which Woody Guthrie later borrowed for his iconic American anthem "This Land is Your Land".

=== II. The Ghost and Will of Joe Hill ===
Scored for soprano, baritone and ensemble, and featuring text by Alfred Hayes (1911-1985) and Joe Hill (1879-1915), The Ghost and Will of Joe Hill is a meditation on the final words of the songwriter and labor activist Joe Hill, unjustly executed by firing squad in 1915.

=== III. Perpetual Motion Man ===
Scored for soprano, baritone and ensemble and with words by Michael Daugherty, Perpetual Motion Man is a driving, restless portrayal of Woody Guthrie as a "man on the go", hitching rides in whatever transportation was available to him.

=== IV. Marfa Lights ===
The instrumental interlude Marfa Lights evokes vivid imagery of the Rio Grande and the Texas-Mexico border hills, a site Woody Guthrie would routinely haunt. A solo flugelhorn reflects on the famed ghost lights of Marfa.

=== V. Hear the Dust Blow ===
Incorporating the American folk song "Down in the Valley" and additional words by Michael Daugherty, Hear the Dust Blow for soprano and ensemble reflects on the catastrophic Dust Bowl of the 1930s, a phenomenon that ravaged farm communities across Oklahoma and forced Woody Guthrie to flee Oklahoma alongside thousands of others for the "Promised Land" of California.}

=== VI. Graceland ===
A fervent champion of workers' rights, Woody Guthrie fought tirelessly against rich bosses and powerful landowners, many of whom purchased lavish tombstones in cemeteries like "Graceland" in Chicago. The rollicking Elvis-inspired number Graceland is a tour-de-force for baritone and ensemble, combining portions of Carl Sandburg's "Graceland" (1916) with original text by Michael Daugherty.

=== VII. Forbidden Fruit ===
Possessing a similar jocular bent to fellow storyteller Mark Twain, Woody Guthrie wrote songs full of irony and humor. Forbidden Fruit features soprano, baritone and ensemble in a play on Twain's retelling of the Adam and Eve fable, with additional text by Michael Daugherty.

=== VIII. Hot Air ===
Guthrie abided neither racketeers nor hucksters pedaling false virtue, as he might have encountered in the widely disseminated AM radio broadcasts of Father Charles Coughlin, infamous in the 1930s for his anti-Semitic, fascistic commentary. With words by Michael Daugherty, Hot Air is a biting musical "broadcast" for baritone and ensemble in which the vocalist portrays an AM radio talk show host, "spinning lies from coast to coast".

=== IX. Bread and Roses ===
Woody Guthrie was a lifelong proponent of equal rights. Featuring soprano and bassoon and using as text James Oppenheim's 1911 suffrage poem of the same name, Bread and Roses is a solemn ode to the legions of women who tirelessly fought for the right to vote.

=== X. This Land Sings ===
This Land Sings is an expansion of the instrumental Overture, with the addition of material from the 19th-century folk song "Wayfaring Stranger", brought back later on in the final movement.

=== XI. Silver Bullet ===
Scored for baritone singer and ensemble and with words by Michael Daugherty, Silver Bullet features a "bullet-proof baritone" who sings that owning a gun is a "license to kill".

=== XII. This Trombone Kills Fascists ===
This Trombone Kills Fascists features trombone and percussion, a short instrumental evocation of the words Woody Guthrie painted on the side of his acoustic guitar: "THIS MACHINE KILLS FASCISTS".

=== XIII. Don't Sing Me a Love Song ===
Don't Sing Me a Love Song is anti-romantic music for soprano, baritone and ensemble in which a heartbroken, soon-to-be-abandoned woman tells her lover to pack his bags. Words are by Michael Daugherty.

=== XIV. My Heart is Burning ===
Scored for harmonica and contrabass, My Heart is Burning is a solemn instrumental requiem for the three family members Woody Guthrie lost to a fluke series of tragic fires.

=== XV. I'm Gonna Walk That Lonesome Valley ===
Woody Guthrie was renowned for his covers of traditional American music, such as I'm Gonna Walk That Lonesome Valley. Incorporating only that song's text, Michael Daugherty composes an original melody scored as a duet for baritone and clarinet.

=== XVI. Mermaid Avenue ===
Michael Daugherty here writes instrumental klezmer music depicting the colorful Coney Island Jewish community where Woody Guthrie would reside alongside his second wife, a member of the Martha Graham Dance Company. The vivacious atmosphere is at one point interrupted by sinister music scored in low, hushed tones, as Mermaid Avenue also details the period when Guthrie experienced the early signs of Huntington's disease, to which he would succumb in 1967.

=== XVII. Wayfaring Stranger/900 Miles ===
Wayfaring Stranger/900 Miles is a juxtaposition of two classic American folk songs Woody Guthrie often performed in his myriad travels across the nation. In this final movement scored for full ensemble, the two vocalists conclude with wistful whistling, symbolizing Guthrie's walk down a lonesome road towards a distant horizon.
