= American Gothic (composition) =

Composition by Michael Daugherty

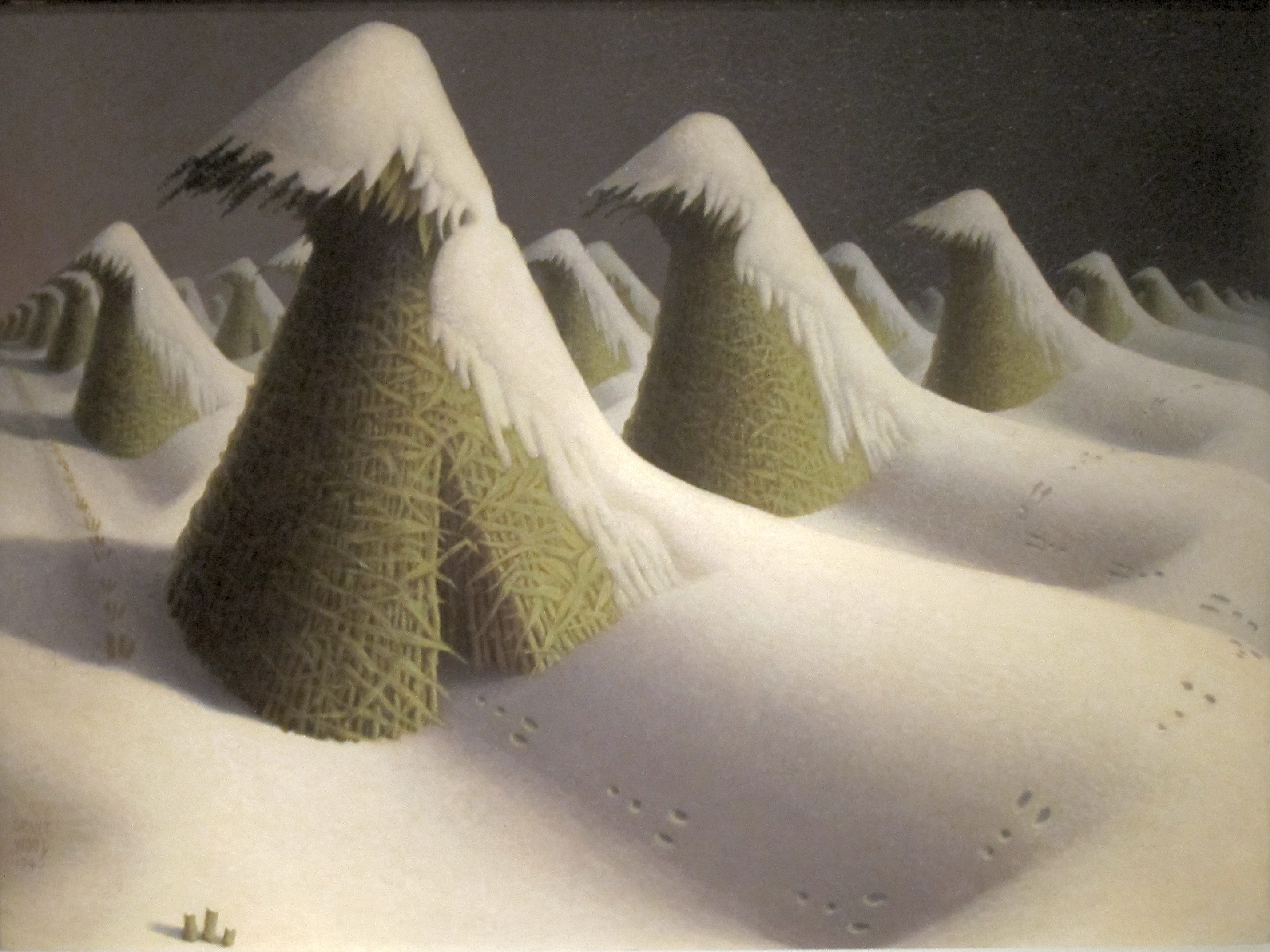
January (1939) Grant Wood, setting of Michael Daugherty's 2nd movement, "Winter Dreams"

American Gothic is an orchestral composition by the American composer Michael Daugherty. The approximately 20-minute work is composed in three movements inspired by the paintings of the Iowan artist Grant Wood (1891–1942). Daugherty is a native of Cedar Rapids, Iowa, where the piece premiered on May 4, 2013, at Cedar Rapids' Paramount Theatre, with Timothy Hankewich, conductor.

== Instrumentation ==
The piece is scored for piccolo, 2 flutes, 2 oboes, English horn, 2 clarinets, bass clarinet, 2 bassoons, contrabassoon, 4 horns, 3 trumpets, 3 trombones, tuba, timpani, percussion (3 players), harp, piano, and strings.

== Movements ==
There are three movements:

1. On a Roll
2. Winter Dreams
3. Pitchfork

== Reception ==
The world premiere of American Gothic received a strongly favorable review, noting the 1,000+ listeners in attendance and the enthusiastic reception of Daugherty's groundbreaking foray into orchestral bluegrass in the third movement.

== Discography ==
- Michael Daugherty -- American Gothic (2014)
