= Limelight (magazine) =

Australian arts and culture magazine

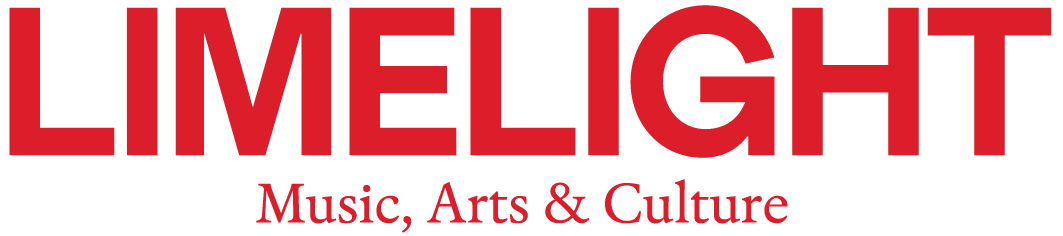
- Editor: Jo Litson
- Digital Editor: Jason Blake
- Editor-at-Large: Clive Paget
- Former editors: Clive Paget, Francis Merson, Katarina Kroslakova
- Staff writers: Maddy Briggs
- Categories: Music, arts, culture
- Frequency: 11 issues per year
- Format: Print, Digital
- Circulation: 9,138 (2012)
- Publisher: Limelight Arts Media Pty Ltd
- First issue: January 1976
- Company: Limelight Arts Media Pty Ltd
- Country: Australia
- Based in: Sydney
- Language: English
- Website: limelight-arts.com.au
- ISSN: 1448-2800

Limelight is an Australian digital and print magazine focusing on music, arts and culture. It is based in Sydney, New South Wales. Originally published in 1976 by the Australian Broadcasting Corporation (ABC), as ABC Radio 24 Hours, or simply 24 Hours, since March 2018 it has been published independently by Limelight Arts Media, owned by music lovers Robert Veel and Bruce Watson.

Limelight publishes its print magazine 11 times per year and circulates a weekly digital music and performing arts newsletter to more than 30,000 subscribers. The Limelight website publishes reviews of orchestral music, chamber music, opera, theatre, dance and film, performing arts news, artist profiles and in-depth features. It is read by more than 1.25 million visitors to its website each year. Limelight's 'eventful' listing service and weekly newsletter keeps readers up to date on performances around Australia.

== History ==
Founded in January 1976, the magazine was originally published under the name ABC Radio 24 Hours, or simply 24 Hours, and relaunched as Limelight in July 2003.

=== Ownership ===
The magazine was originally a subsidiary of the ABC's classical music radio station, ABC Classic FM, and existed primarily to provide program details for the station's listeners. The title 24 Hours came to the inaugural Director of ABC FM, Christopher Symons, "literally in the middle of the night. It also occurred to me... that if we got the magazine and its title established, it would be difficult for management to cut the station back to 18 hours a day".

From 2006 to January 2014 it was published by Haymarket Media Group under licence from the ABC. From February 2014 ownership was transferred from ABC to Arts Illuminated Pty Ltd.

From 2016 to 2018, Limelight was owned by Arts Initiative Australia, an organisation founded by Andrew Batt-Rawden, Natalie Zwar, Andrew Luboski, Toby Chadd, and Claire Stokes. In March 2018 Limelight was purchased by Limelight Arts Media Pty Ltd. In 2018 Cara Anderson was appointed CEO.

=== Content change and relaunch ===
In January 2012, the magazine ceased listing detailed ABC Classic FM radio programs for the forthcoming month. This reflected a decision by ABC management to end forward programming, to allow greater flexibility. Under editor Francis Merson, Limelight was awarded the Relaunch of the Year prize at the 2012 Publishers Australia Excellence Awards. This was in recognition of the magazine's successful relaunch in June 2012, with a new design and greater editorial focus on contemporary music and reviews. Francis Merson also earned runner-up in Editor of the Year category.

== Description and management ==
The magazine publishes articles which include reviews, news, interviews, and artist profiles, as well as event and listening guides, focusing on music and the performing arts. These are published both on its website and in 11 print magazines each year. It still includes highlights from ABC Classic, as the radio station is now called.

As of March 2022 Jo Litson is editor and Cara Anderson is CEO.

== Limelight Awards ==
Between 2007 and 2012, Limelight held the Limelight Awards – the only classical music awards in Australia where the public were invited to vote and help recognise well-loved musicians.

From 2015 or earlier Limelight honoured the "Artists of the Year" in various categories. From 2018 onwards they were divided into "People's Choice" and "Critics' Choice", with one Australian and one international winner in each.

Limelight also names "Recordings of the Year" in several categories and with an overall winner. In 2021 the categories were Orchestral, Chamber, Instrumental, Vocal and Opera Recording of the Year.

== Editors ==
- Francis Merson, 2008–2013; runner-up in the 2012 Publishers Australia Excellence Awards for 'Editor of the Year' (below 20k circulation)
- Clive Paget, 2015–2018; as of March 2022 based in New York City as editor-at-large
- Jo Litson, from late 2018 to present (as of March 2022), having joined the magazine as deputy editor in 2016 and taking over editing as of the November 2017 issue.

== Notable issues ==
=== Acoustics survey ===
The September 2011 issue of Limelight featured an in-depth survey of musicians to reveal the best (and worst) concert hall acoustics in Australia's 20 major concert halls, for orchestral, chamber and vocal music. The survey, which gathered opinions from 200 performers, critics and audience members, ranked the Perth Concert Hall as the best overall venue and the Melbourne Recital Centre as the top venue for chamber music. The Sydney Opera House's Joan Sutherland Theatre (previously known as the Opera Theatre) was found to have the worst acoustics.

=== Australian orchestra ranking ===
Featured in the April 2013 issue of Limelight, a panel of 15 expert critics and professional musicians from around the country were blind-tested to determine Australia's top symphony orchestra. Whenever possible, repertoire was matched to ensure comparable adjudication and a fair result. In the test, each of the 15 judges was sent recordings of each orchestra on separate CDs labelled simply A to F. Ranking the orchestras from 1 to 6, the expert panel voted the Sydney Symphony Orchestra, the Adelaide Symphony Orchestra and the Queensland Symphony Orchestra in the three top spots. The Melbourne Symphony Orchestra was ranked in fourth place.
