= Michael Daugherty =

American composer (born 1954)

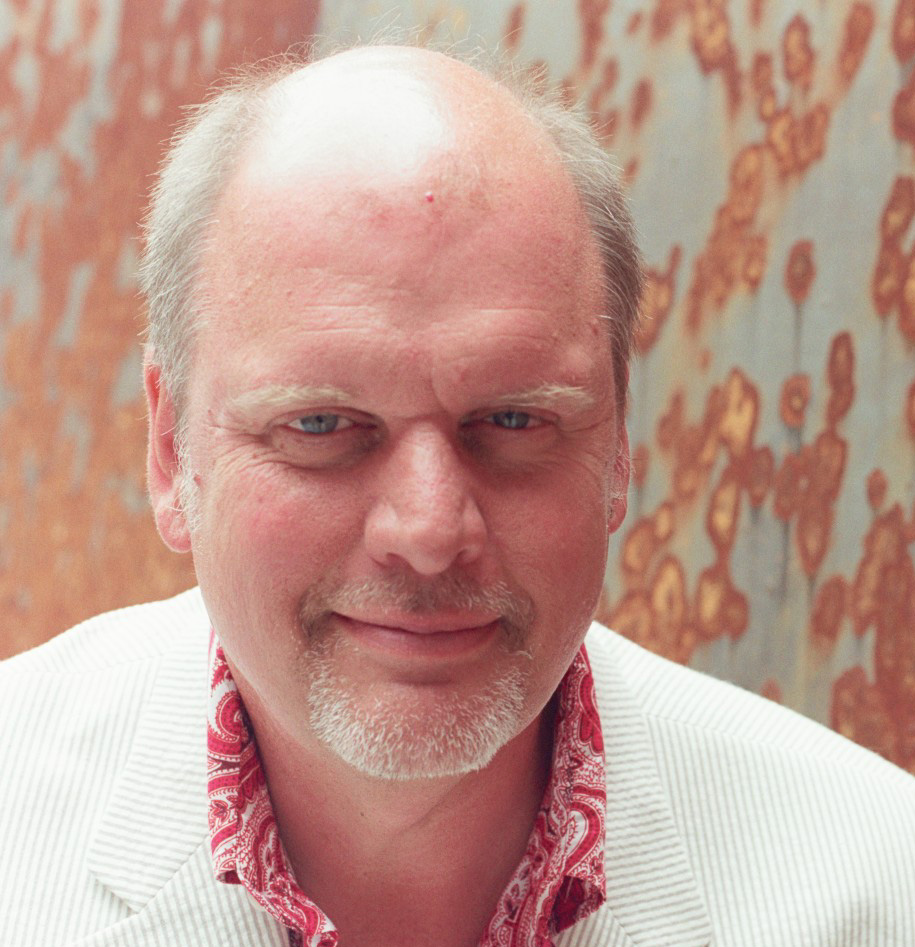
- Michael Kevin Daugherty

Background information
- Born: April 28, 1954 (age 72); Cedar Rapids, Iowa, U.S.
- Genres: Orchestral; Contemporary Classical
- Occupation: Composer
- Website: www.michaeldaugherty.net
- List of compositions by Michael Daugherty

Michael Kevin Daugherty (born April 28, 1954) is an American composer, pianist, and teacher. He is influenced by popular culture, Romanticism, and postmodernism. Daugherty's notable works include his Superman comic book-inspired Metropolis Symphony for orchestra (1988–93), Dead Elvis for solo bassoon and chamber ensemble (1993), Jackie O (1997), Niagara Falls for symphonic band (1997), UFO for solo percussion and orchestra (1999) and for symphonic band (2000), Bells for Stokowski from Philadelphia Stories for orchestra (2001) and for symphonic band (2002), Fire and Blood for solo violin and orchestra (2003) inspired by Diego Rivera and Frida Kahlo, Time Machine for three conductors and orchestra (2003), Ghost Ranch for orchestra (2005), Deus ex Machina for piano and orchestra (2007), Labyrinth of Love for soprano and chamber winds (2012), American Gothic for orchestra (2013), and Tales of Hemingway for cello and orchestra (2015). Daugherty has been described by The Times as "a master icon maker" with a "maverick imagination, fearless structural sense and meticulous ear."

Currently, Daugherty is professor of composition at the University of Michigan School of Music, Theatre & Dance in Ann Arbor, Michigan. Michael Daugherty's music is published by Peermusic Classical, Boosey & Hawkes, and since 2010, Michael Daugherty Music/Bill Holab Music.

== Life and career ==
=== Early years ===
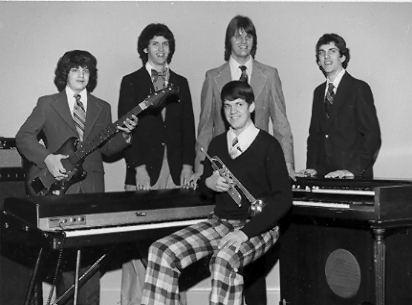
Daugherty brothers: (L-to-R) Tom, Pat, Michael, Tim, and Matt, 1973

Michael Daugherty was born into a musical family on April 28, 1954, in Cedar Rapids, Iowa. His father Willis Daugherty (1929–2011) was a jazz and country and western drummer, his mother Evelyn Daugherty (1927–1974) was an amateur singer, and his grandmother Josephine Daugherty (1907–1991) was a pianist for silent film. Daugherty's four younger brothers are all professional musicians: Pat Daugherty (b. 1956) Leader of the group New York Electric Piano, Tim Daugherty (b. 1958) jazz/pop composer of over 15 CD's featuring original compositions, Matt Daugherty (b. 1960) teacher of Music education in Florida, and Tommy D. Daugherty (b. 1961) engineer and producer for many of the Death Row artists most specifically Tupac Shukar.

At the age of 8, Daugherty taught himself how to play piano by pumping the pedals of the player piano and watching how piano keys moved to Tin Pan Alley tunes such as "Alexander's Ragtime Band". Music was a significant activity in the Daugherty family, especially during the holidays when relatives would participate in jam sessions of popular songs like "Misty" and "Sentimental Journey". Additionally, the Daugherty family would frequently gather around the television in the evening to watch popular variety hours such as The Ed Sullivan Show, The Jackie Gleason Show, and The Tonight Show Starring Johnny Carson. The record collection at the Daugherty home consisted mainly of 'easy listening music' of the fifties and music from Broadway theatre.

During his developmental years, Daugherty's mother encouraged him to paint, draw cartoons, tap dance, and play basketball and his father and uncle Danny Nicol taught him how to play rock and jazz drums. From 1963 to 1967 Daugherty played bass drum in the Emerald Knights and tom-toms in the Grenadier Drum and Bugle Corps where he competed against other Drum and Bugle Corps throughout small Midwestern towns.

From 1968 to 1972, Daugherty was the leader, arranger, and organist for his high school rock, soul, and funk band, The Soul Company. This band performed a variety of Motown charts and music by James Brown, Blood Sweat & Tears, and Sly and the Family Stone. Because accessing sheet music was almost impossible, Daugherty learned to hand-transcribe the music by listening to vinyl recordings. With the help of his father, who drove the band across the state, The Soul Company became a locally popular group that performed at high school proms, dances, and other events.

During the same years, Daugherty was a piano accompanist for the Washington High School Concert Choir, a solo jazz piano performer in nightclubs and lounges, and he appeared on local television as the pianist for the country and western Dale Thomas Show. Daugherty interviewed jazz artists who performed in Iowa, including Buddy Rich, Stan Kenton, George Shearing, and Rahsaan Roland Kirk, and he wrote articles on their music for the high school newspaper. During the summers of 1972–77, Daugherty played Hammond organ at county fairs across the Midwest for various popular music stars such as Bobby Vinton, Boots Randolph, Pee Wee King, and members of The Lawrence Welk Show.

=== Education in the United States and Europe ===
Daugherty studied music composition and jazz at the University of North Texas College of Music from 1972 to 1976. His teachers of composition included Martin Mailman and James Sellars. Daugherty also played jazz piano in the Two O'Clock Lab Band. It was after hearing the Dallas Symphony Orchestra perform the Piano Concerto by Samuel Barber that Daugherty decided to devote his full energies into composing music for the concert stage. In 1974, conductor Anshel Brusilow programmed a new work with the University of North Texas Symphony Orchestra, Daugherty was 20 years of age. After his premiere of Movements for Orchestra, the composition faculty awarded Daugherty a fellowship, which allowed him to continue his musical studies at the university. Daugherty received a Bachelor of Music degree in Composition from North Texas State University in 1976.

That same year, Daugherty moved to New York City where he studied serialism with Charles Wuorinen at the Manhattan School of Music for two years, and received a Master of Music in Composition degree in 1978. To earn money for his studies, Daugherty was employed as an usher at Carnegie Hall and a rehearsal pianist for dance classes directed by the New York City Ballet dancer Jacques d'Amboise.

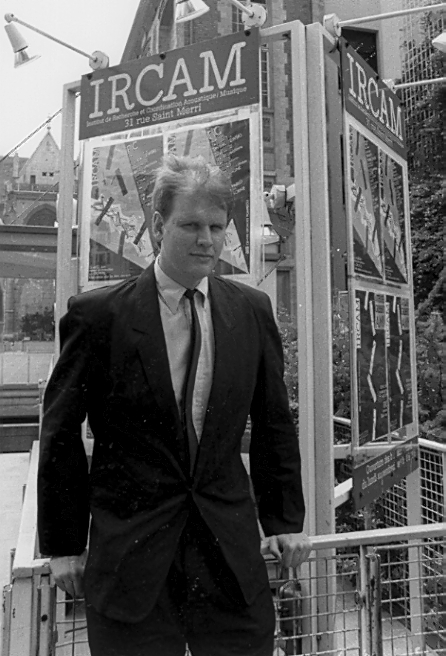
Daughterty at IRCAM, 1979

Daugherty frequently attended "uptown" and "downtown" new music concerts in New York City; this is where he became acquainted with composers such as Milton Babbitt, Morton Feldman, and Pierre Boulez. In 1978, Boulez, then the music director of the New York Philharmonic, invited Daugherty to apply to his recently opened computer music institute in Paris: IRCAM (Institut de Recherche et Coordination Acoustique/Musique). A Fulbright Fellowship enabled Daugherty to move to Paris to study computer music at IRCAM from 1979 to 1980. During his time at IRCAM, he met many composers such as Luciano Berio, Gérard Grisey, Tod Machover, and Frank Zappa. In Paris, Daugherty had the opportunity to hear contemporary music by the leading European composers of the time performed by the Ensemble l'Itinéraire and Boulez's Ensemble InterContemporain. He also attended analysis classes given by Betsy Jolas at the Conservatoire National Supérieur de Musique de Paris.

In the fall of 1980, Daugherty returned to America to pursue doctoral studies in composition at the Yale School of Music. Daugherty studied with Jacob Druckman and other Pulitzer Prize winning composers at Yale, including Bernard Rands and Roger Reynolds. He also studied improvisational notation systems and open form with experimental music composer Earle Brown. Daugherty's composition class at Yale included student composers who would later become unique and important voices in contemporary music: Bang on a Can composers Michael Gordon, David Lang, and Julia Wolfe; along with Robert Beaser, Aaron Jay Kernis, Scott Lindroth, and Betty Olivero.

At Yale, Daugherty wrote his dissertation on the relationship between the music of Charles Ives and Gustav Mahler and the writings of Goethe and Ralph Waldo Emerson. He worked closely on this dissertation with John Kirkpatrick, who was the curator of the Ives Collection at Yale and gave the 1938 premiere of Ives' Piano Sonata No. 2: Concord Sonata. Daugherty also continued his interest in jazz where he worked with Willie Ruff and directed the Yale Jazz Ensemble. It was Ruff who introduced Daugherty to jazz arranger Gil Evans, who, at that time, was looking for an assistant. For the next several years, Daugherty traveled by train from New Haven to Evans' private studio in Manhattan. Daugherty helped Evans organize his music manuscripts and complete projects, including the reconstruction of the lost arrangements of Porgy and Bess, which was originally used for the 1958 recording with Miles Davis.

During the summer of 1981, Daugherty studied composition with Pulitzer Prize–winning composer Mario Davidovsky as a composition fellow at Tanglewood. It was at Tanglewood that Daugherty met the composer/conductor Leonard Bernstein. After hearing Daugherty's music, Bernstein encouraged Daugherty to seriously consider integrating American popular music with concert music.

In the summer of 1982, Daugherty traveled to Germany to attend the Darmstädter Ferienkurse (Internationale Ferienkurse für Neue Musik – Darmstadt International Summer Courses in New Music). Daugherty attended lectures given by composers, including Brian Ferneyhough and Karlheinz Stockhausen, and performances by the Arditti String Quartet. At Darmstadt, Daugherty became friends with Karlheinz's son, the trumpet player Markus Stockhausen. Together they formed an experimental improvisation ensemble (Markus Stockhausen on trumpet and electronics and Daugherty on synthesizers) that, over several years, performed in concert halls and clubs across Europe.

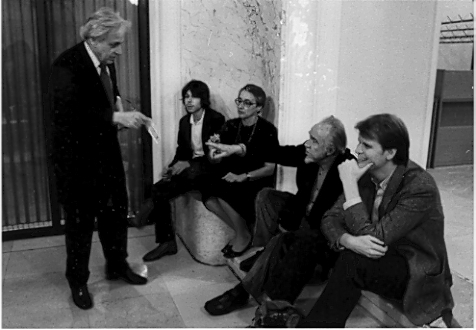
From left to right: György Ligeti, Lukas Ligeti, Vera Ligeti, Conlon Nancarrow, and Michael Daugherty at the ISCM World Music Days in Graz, Austria, 1982

In the fall of 1982, Daugherty was invited by composer György Ligeti to study composition with him at the Hochschule für Musik und Theater Hamburg. In addition to attending Ligeti's composition seminar (which took place at his apartment in Hamburg), Daugherty traveled with Ligeti to attend concerts and festivals of his music throughout Europe. Daugherty met Nancarrow in Graz, Austria, when Ligeti introduced Nancarrow and his music to the European intelligentsia at the 1982 ISCM (International Society for Contemporary Music) World Music Days. During the following two years (1983–84), Daugherty continued to study with Ligeti while employed as a solo jazz pianist in night clubs in Cambridge, England and Amsterdam. To create "original" music, Ligeti encouraged and inspired Daugherty to find new ways to integrate computer music, jazz, rock, and American popular music with concert music. In the fall of 1984, Daugherty returned to America and devoted his career to doing just that.

== Discography ==
=== Recordings on all labels ===
DAUGHERTY, M.: Blue Electra, concerto for violin and orchestra^{1} / Last Dance at the Surf / To the New World^{2} (^{1}Anne Akiko Meyers, violin; ^{2}Elissa Johnston, soprano; David Alan Miller, conductor; Albany Symphony Orchestra); 2025	Naxos 8.559955	Concertos, Orchestral
DAUGHERTY, M.: This Land Sings: Inspired by the Life and Times of Woody Guthrie (Annika Socolofsky, John Daugherty, Dogs of Desire, David Alan Miller); 2020	Naxos 8.559889	Vocal
DAUGHERTY, M.: Dreamachine / Trail of Tears / Reflections on the Mississippi (Evelyn Glennie, Amy Porter, Carol Jantsch, Albany Symphony, David Allan Miller); 2018	Naxos 8.559807	Concertos
DAUGHERTY, M.: Tales of Hemingway / American Gothic / Once Upon A Castle (Zuill Bailey, Paul Jacobs, Nashville Symphony, Giancarlo Guerrero); 2016 Grammy Awards: Best Classical Compendium, Best Classical Instrumental Solo, and Best Contemporary Classical Composition	Naxos 8.559798	Concertos, Orchestral, Concertos
DAUGHERTY, M.: Mount Rushmore / Radio City / The Gospel According to Sister Aimee (Paul Jacobs, Pacific Chorale, Pacific Symphony, Carl St. Clair); 2013	Naxos 8.559749	Choral - Secular, Orchestral, Wind Ensemble/Band Music
DAUGHERTY, M.: Route 66 / Ghost Ranch / Sunset Strip / Time Machine (Bournemouth Symphony, Marin Alsop, Mei-Ann Chen, Laura Jackson); 2011	Naxos 8.559613	Orchestral, Chamber Music, Orchestral
MACKEY, J.: Strange Humors / DAUGHERTY, M.: Raise the Roof / Brooklyn Bridge / SYLER, J.: The Hound of Heaven (Rutgers Wind Ensemble, William Berz); 2010	Naxos 8.572529	Concertos
ROUSE, C.: Wolf Rounds / DAUGHERTY, M.: Ladder to the Moon / MASLANKA, D.: Trombone Concerto (Gary Green, University of Miami Frost Wind Ensemble); 2010	Naxos 8.572439	Orchestral
DAUGHERTY, M.: Fire and Blood / MotorCity Triptych / Raise the Roof (Ida Kavafian, Brian Jones, Detroit Symphony, Neeme Jarvi); 2009	Naxos 8.559372	Orchestral
DAUGHERTY, M.: Metropolis Symphony / Deus ex Machina (Terrence Wilson, Nashville Symphony, Giancarlo Guerrero); 2009 Grammy Awards: Best Orchestral Performance, Best Engineered Album, Classical, and Best Contemporary Classical Composition	Naxos 8.559635	Orchestral, Concertos
DAUGHERTY, M.: Sunset Strip / WILLIAMS, J.: Escapades / ROREM, N.: Lions / ROUSE, C.: Friandises (Branford Marsalis, North Carolina Symphony, Grant Llewellyn); 2009	BIS BIS-SACD-1644	Orchestral
Wind Band Music - DAUGHERTY, M. / BURRITT, M. / GILLINGHAM, D. (Synergy) (John Bruce Yeh, Columbus State University Wind Ensemble, Robert W. Rumbelow); 2009	Naxos 8.572319	Concertos
DAUGHERTY, M.: Philadelphia Stories / UFO (Evelyn Glennie, Colorado Symphony, Marin Alsop); 2004	Naxos 8.559165	Orchestral
LEES, B.: Passacaglia / PERSICHETTI, V.: Symphony No. 4 / DAUGHERTY, M.: Hell's Angels (American Contrasts) (Oregon Symphony, James DePreist); 2002	Delos DE3291	Orchestral, Instrumental
Story of Naxos (The) - The Soundtrack	Naxos Special Projects 9.00124	Orchestral
Harlem Blues (Donald Byrd album)	Landmark LLP/LCD 1516	Jazz

== Teaching ==
Daugherty is an educator of young composers and advocate for contemporary music. As an Assistant Professor of Composition at the Oberlin Conservatory of Music (1986–91), Daugherty organized guest residencies of composers with performances of their music. Daugherty also organized the 1988 Electronic Festival Plus Festival, which took place at Oberlin and featured music from over 50 composers. While teaching composition at Oberlin, Daugherty collaborated with renowned jazz trumpeter Donald Byrd, who taught there from 1987 to 1989. After Daugherty introduced Byrd to the W.C. Handy composition "Harlem Blues", Byrd asked Daugherty to arrange it for a commercial recording made at the Van Gelder Studio located in Englewood Cliffs, NJ for the Landmark label, with Daugherty playing synthesizers.

In 1991, Daugherty was invited to join the composition faculty at the University of Michigan School of Music (Ann Arbor). He replaced Leslie Bassett, who retired. Daugherty was co-chair of the composition department with composer William Bolcom from 1998 to 2001, and chair of the department from 2002 to 2006. At the University of Michigan, Daugherty mentored many young composers, including Clarice Assad, Derek Bermel, Gabriela Lena Frank, Kristin Kuster, David T. Little, Shuying Li, Joel Puckett, Andrea Reinkemeyer, Arlene Sierra, D. J. Sparr and Roger Zare. Daugherty has organized residencies of guest composers with performances of their music, including Louis Andriessen, Michael Colgrass, Michael Torke, Joan Tower, Betsy Jolas and György Ligeti. He has also composed new works, including Niagara Falls (1997) and Bells for Stokowski (2002), for the University of Michigan Symphony Band and its two most recent conductors, H. Robert Reynolds and Michael Haithcock.

Daugherty organized a three-day festival and conference entitled ONCE. MORE., which took place November 2–4, 2010 at Rackham Auditorium, located on the University of Michigan campus. For the first time in 50 years, the original ONCE composers Robert Ashley, Gordon Mumma, Roger Reynolds and Donald Scarvada returned to Ann Arbor to participate in concerts featuring their recent compositions and their works from the original ONCE festival held in Ann Arbor in the 1960s.

Daugherty has served as a final judge for the Broadcast Music Incorporated (BMI) Student Composers Awards, the Gaudeamus International Composers Competition, and the Detroit Symphony Orchestra's Elaine Lebenborn Award for Female Composers. He has also been a panelist for the National Endowment for the Arts and Meet the Composer. Daugherty has served as a composer mentor for reading sessions of young composers' music by organizations such as the American Composers Orchestra, Minnesota Composers Orchestra, Cabrillo Festival of Contemporary Music, Omaha Symphony, and the Young Composers Institute in Apeldoorn (Netherlands).

Daugherty has been Composer-in-Residence with the Louisville Symphony Orchestra (2000), Detroit Symphony Orchestra (1999–2003), Colorado Symphony Orchestra (2001–02), Cabrillo Festival of Contemporary Music (2001, 2006, 2011), Westshore Symphony Orchestra (2005–06), Eugene Symphony (2006), the Henry Mancini Summer Institute (2006), the Music from Angel Fire Chamber Music Festival (2006), the Pacific Symphony (2010), Chattanooga Symphony Orchestra (2012), New Century Chamber Orchestra (2014), and the Albany Symphony Orchestra (2015).

Institutions of higher learning who have invited Daugherty include the University of Texas at Austin, University of Colorado at Boulder, Rice University, Northwestern University, Syracuse University, Indiana University, University of Iowa, University of North Texas, Vanderbilt University, Louisiana State University, Appalachian State University, University of Southern California, Eastman School of Music, The Hartt School, Juilliard School of Music, and Shenandoah University Conservatory of Music.

In 2001, Daugherty was invited to present his music with performances by the United States Air Force Band at the Midwest Clinic "The Midnight Special" in Chicago. Daugherty has participated in the Ravinia Festival Community Outreach program which is designed to promote and encourage new music by student ensembles in the Chicago Public Schools.

== Awards and honors ==
Daugherty received the Kennedy Center Freidheim Award (1989) for his compositions Snap! and Blue Like an Orange, the Goddard Lieberson Fellowship from the American Academy of Arts and Letters (1991), fellowships from the National Endowment for the Arts (1992), the Guggenheim Foundation (1996), and the Stoeger Prize from the Chamber Music Society of Lincoln Center (2000). In 2005, Daugherty received the Lancaster Symphony Orchestra Composer's Award, and in 2007, the Delaware Symphony Orchestra selected Daugherty as the winner of the A. I. duPont Award. Also in 2007, Daugherty was named "Outstanding Classical Composer" at the Detroit Music Awards and received the American Bandmasters Association Ostwald Award for his composition Raise the Roof for Timpani and Symphonic Band. Daugherty received several Grammy awards in the category of Best Contemporary Classical Composition for the Nashville Symphony recordings of Deus ex Machina and Tales of Hemingway for cello and orchestra.
