= Grammy Award for Best Classical Instrumental Solo =

American music industry award

- Awarded for: quality classic instrumental solos
- Country: United States
- Presented by: National Academy of Recording Arts and Sciences
- First award: 2012
- Currently held by: Vikingur Ólafsson – Bach: Goldberg Variations (2025)
- Website: grammy.com

The Grammy Award for Best Classical Instrumental Solo was first awarded during the annual Grammy Awards ceremony in 2012.

It combined the previous categories for Best Instrumental Soloist(s) Performance (with orchestra) and Best Instrumental Soloist Performance (without orchestra).

The restructuring of these categories was a result of the Recording Academy's wish to decrease the list of categories and awards.

The Grammy is awarded to the instrumental soloist(s) and to the conductor when applicable, and to the producer(s) and engineer(s) if they worked on over 50% of playing time of the recording.

== Recipients ==
Year^{[I]}	Recipient(s)	Work	Nominees	Ref.
2012	Giancarlo Guerrero (conductor); Christopher Lamb (with the Nashville Symphony)	Schwantner: Concerto for Percussion & Orchestra	Lan Shui (conductor) and Michala Petri – Chinese Recorder Concertos - East Meets West; Yuja Wang – Rachmaninov: Piano Concerto no. 2 in C minor, Op. 18; Rhapsody on a Theme of Paganini; Leif Ove Andsnes – Rachmaninov: Piano Concertos nos. 3 & 4; Ursula Oppens – Winging It - Piano Music of John Corigliano	
2013	Kim Kashkashian	Kurtág & Ligeti: Music for Viola	Andras Schiff – Bach: Das Wohltemperierte Clavier; Jory Vinikour – The Complete Harpsichord Works of Rameau; Antonio Meneses, Claudio Cruz (conductor) (with the Northern Sinfonia) – Gal & Elgar: Cello Concertos; Hansjörg Albrecht – Holst: The Planets	
2014	Evelyn Glennie (soloist); David Alan Miller (conductor) (with the Albany Symphony Orchestra)	Corigliano: Conjurer - Concerto for Percussionist & String Orchestra	Patricia Kopatchinskaja (soloist), Peter Eötvös (conductor) – Bartók, Eötvös & Ligeti; Gloria Cheng – The Edge of Light; Yefim Bronfman (soloist), Alan Gilbert (conductor) – Lindberg: Piano Concerto No. 2; Leila Josefowicz (soloist), Esa-Pekka Salonen (conductor) – Salonen: Violin Concerto; Nyx; Maria João Pires – Schubert: Piano Sonatas D. 845 & D. 960	
2015	Jason Vieaux	Play	Leon Fleisher – All The Things You Are; Daniil Trifonov – The Carnegie Recital; Xavier Phillips – Dutilleux: Tout un Monde Lointain; Jory Vinikour – Toccatas	
2016	Augustin Hadelich (soloist); Ludovic Morlot (conductor)	Dutilleux: Violin Concerto, L'Arbre Des Songes	Joseph Moog (soloist), Nicholas Milton (conductor) – Grieg & Moszkowski: Piano Concertos; Kristian Bezuidenhout (soloist) – Mozart: Keyboard Music Vol. 7; Daniil Trifonov (soloist) – Rachmaninov Variations; Ursula Oppens (soloist) – Rzewski: The People United Will Never Be Defeated!	
2017	Zuill Bailey (soloist); Giancarlo Guerrero (conductor)	Daugherty: Tales of Hemingway	Leila Josefowicz (soloist), David Robertson (conductor) – Adams: Scheherazade.2; Christian Tetzlaff (soloist), John Storgårds (conductor) – Dvorak: Violin Concerto & Romance; Suk: Fantasy; Kristian Bezuidenhout (soloist) – Mozart: Keyboard Music, Vols 8 & 9; Gil Shaham (soloist), Stéphane Denève (conductor) – 1930s Violin Concertos, Vol. 2	
2018	Daniil Trifonov	Transcendental	Murray Perahia – Bach: The French Suites; Steven Isserlis; Florian Donderer (conductor) – Haydn: Cello Concertos; Maria Lettberg; Ariane Matiakh (conductor) – Levina: The Piano Concertos; Frank Peter Zimmermann; Alan Gilbert – Shostakovich: Violin Concertos Nos. 1 & 2	
2019	James Ehnes (soloist); Ludovic Morlot (conductor)	Kernis: Violin Concerto	Yuja Wang; Simon Rattle (conductor) – Bartók: Piano Concerto No. 2; Christina Day Martinson; Martin Pearlman (conductor) – Biber: The Mystery Sonatas; Joshua Bell – Bruch: Scottish Fantasy Op. 46; Violin Concerto No. 1 in G Minor Op. 26; Craig Morris – Glass: Three Pieces in the Shape of a Square	
2020	Nicola Benedetti (soloist), Cristian Măcelaru (conductor)	Marsalis: Violin Concerto; Fiddle Dance Suite	Yuja Wang - The Berlin Recital; Yolanda Kondonassis (soloist); Ward Stare (conductor) - Higdon: Harp Concerto; Jan Kraybill - The Orchestral Organ; Tessa Lark (soloist); David Alan Miller (conductor) - Torke: Sky, Concerto for Violin	
2021	Richard O'Neill (soloist); David Alan Miller (conductor)	Theofanidis: Concerto for Violin and Chamber Orchestra	Kirill Gerstein (soloist); Thomas Adès (conductor) - Adès: Concerto for Piano and Orchestra; Igor Levit - Beethoven: Complete Piano Sonatas; Augustin Hadelich (soloist); Jakob Hrusa (conductor) - Bohemian Tales; Daniil Trifonov (soloist); Yannick Nézet-Séguin (conductor) - Destination Rachmaninov - Arrival	
2022	Jennifer Koh	Alone Together	Simone Dinnerstein – An American Mosaic; Augustin Hadelich – Bach: Sonatas & Partitas; Gil Shaham, Eric Jacobsen (conductor) – Beethoven & Brahms: Violin Concertos; Mak Grgić – Mak Bach; Curtis Stewart – Of Power	
2023	Time For Three (artist); Xian Zhang (conductor)	Letters for the Future	Hilary Hahn - Abels: Isolation Variation; Daniil Trifonov - Bach: The Art of Life; Mitsuko Uchida - Beethoven: Diabelli Variations; Mak Grgić - A Night in Upper Town - The Music of Zoran Krajacic	
2024	Yuja Wang (soloist); Teddy Abrams (conductor)	The American Project	Robert Black - Adams, John Luther: Darkness and Scattered Light; Andy Akiho - Akiho: Cylinders; Seth Parker Woods - Difficult Grace; Curtis Stewart - Of Love	
2025	Vikingur Ólafsson	Bach: Goldberg Variations	Andy Akiho - Akiho: Longing; Seth Parker Woods (soloist); Christopher Rountree (conductor of Wild Up) - Eastman: The Holy Presence of Joan d'Arc; Mak Grgić - Entourer; Curtis Stewart (soloist); James Blachly (conductor of the Experiential Orchestra) - Perry: Concerto for Violin & Orchestra	
2026	Yo-Yo Ma (soloist); Andris Nelsons (conductor)	Shostakovich: The Cello Concertos	Curtis Stewart (soloist); Michael Repper (conductor) - Coleridge-Taylor: 3 Selections From '24 Negro Melodies'; Mary Dawood Catlin (soloist); Jesús David Medina & Raniero Palm (conductors) - Hope Orchestrated; Adam Tendler (soloist) - Inheritances; Han Chen (soloist); John Jeter (conductor) - Price: Piano Concerto in One Movement in D Minor; Yo-Yo Ma (soloist); Andris Nelsons (conductor) - Shostakovich: The Cello Concertos; Yuja Wang (soloist); Andris Nelsons (conductor) - Shostakovich: The Piano Concertos; Solo Works	
2027	TBA on 7 February 2027		Andy Akiho (soloist); David Danzmayr (conductor) - Akiho: Beneath Lighted Coffers & Concerto for Steel Pans & Orchestra; Sandbox Percussion (artists); David Alan Miller (conductor) - Cuong: Re(new)al; Han Chen (soloist) - Rubinstein: Piano Sonatas Nos. 3 & 4; Curtis Stewart (soloist) - Stewart: 24 American Caprices; Yo-Yo Ma (soloist); Michael Stern (conductor) - Thompson: Breathe/Burn - an Elegy	
