= David Alan Miller =

American conductor (born 1961)

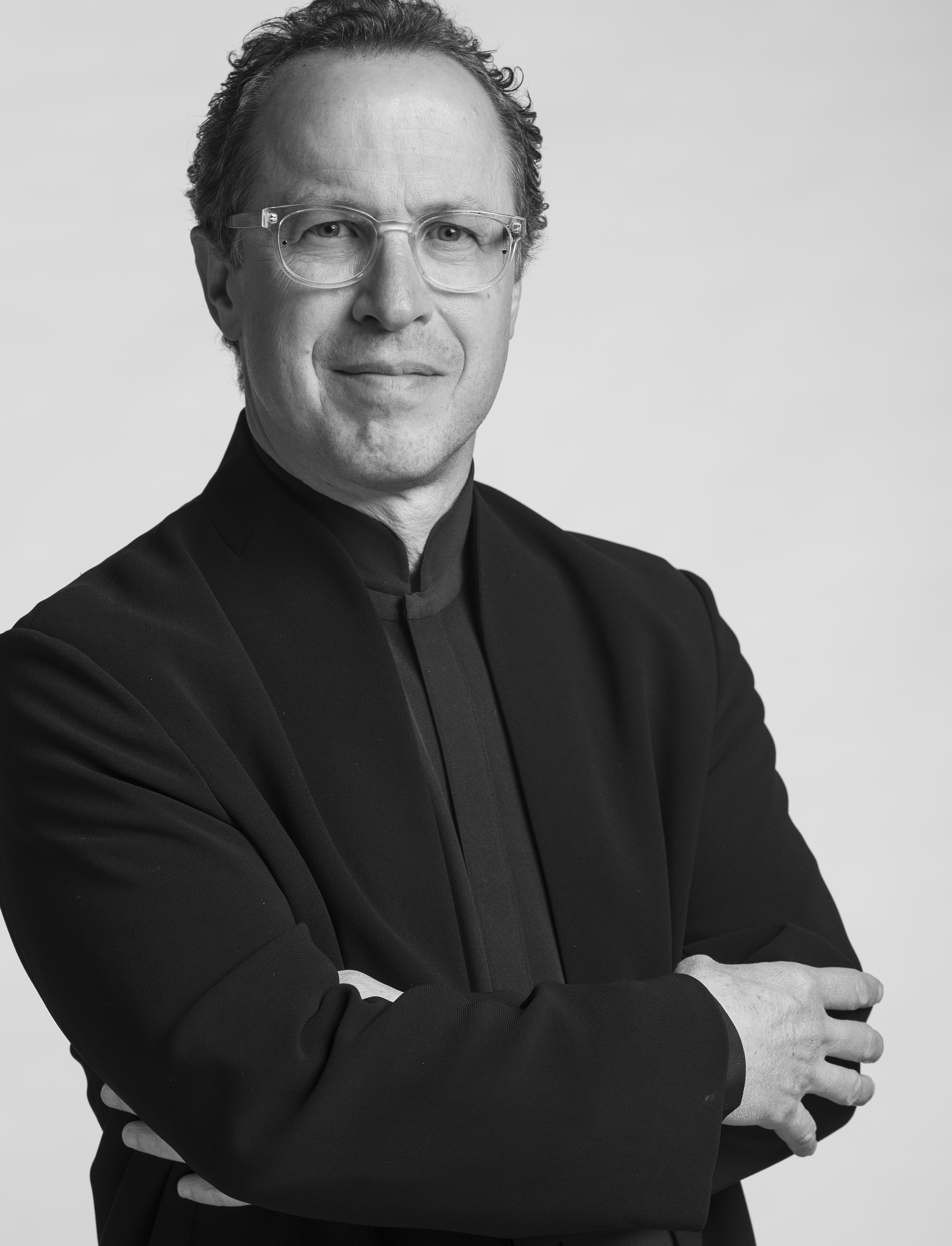
- Miller in 2016

Background information
- Also known as: Cowboy Dave
- Born: 1961 (age 64–65); Los Angeles, California, U.S.
- Genres: Classical; avant-garde rock; funk; folk
- Occupation: Conductor
- Years active: 1982–present
- Labels: Naxos; Albany
- Website: David Alan Miller at the ASO

David Alan Miller (born 1961) is an American conductor. He has served as the music director of the Albany Symphony Orchestra since 1992. Miller was assistant and then associate conductor of the Los Angeles Philharmonic from 1987 to 1992 and music director of the New York Youth Symphony from 1982 to 1988. He is currently also Artistic Advisor to both the Sarasota Orchestra and to The Little Orchestra Society in New York City. He has won two Grammy Awards during his career.

== Early career and education ==
Miller was raised in the Los Angeles area. He graduated with a bachelor's degree from the University of California, Berkeley. He then earned a master's degree in orchestral conducting from The Juilliard School. Miller was appointed Assistant Conductor of the New York Youth Symphony in 1981 and then ascended to the music directorship the following year while he was still a student at Juilliard. He was also a two-term conducting fellow and, later, Associate Director at the Los Angeles Philharmonic Institute.

In 1987, he was appointed Assistant Conductor of the Los Angeles Philharmonic by Music Director André Previn; he was promoted to Associate Conductor in 1990 and held that position for two years. During his tenure with the orchestra, he conducted subscription concerts, an acclaimed family concert series, "Green Umbrella" New Music Group concerts and community concerts, as well as regular programs at the Hollywood Bowl. In the fall of 1987, Miller replaced Previn on only 36-hours notice during a week of regular Philharmonic subscription concerts, earning glowing reviews.

== Albany Symphony Orchestra ==
Miller has been music director and conductor of the Albany Symphony since 1992. Under his leadership, the Albany Symphony has frequently premiered and performed significant works by living American composers. During his tenure, the orchestra has become one of the busiest recording orchestras in the US, and has released more than 30 discs, mainly featuring new or recent American music. He instituted a major annual American Music Festival in 1998, with multiple events featuring new works over five days each May. In the summer of 2017, the orchestra celebrated the bicentennial of the Erie Canal with a one-of-a-kind boat and barge trip, collaborating with community performing groups on seven major world premiere compositions on consecutive nights in communities along the Canal. The trip garnered national attention, including an article in The New York Times. In 2019, the orchestra's American Music Festival, "Sing Out, NY," celebrated New York State's major role in social justice movements, focused specifically on the 100th anniversary of the 19th amendment and the 50th anniversary of the Stonewall Riots. In recognition of the orchestra's commitment to contemporary music and innovative programming, Miller and the Albany Symphony were twice invited to appear at "Spring For Music," an annual festival of America's most creative orchestras at New York City's Carnegie Hall. The orchestra was the only ensemble to perform more than once at this festival. Miller and the orchestra also appeared at "SHIFT: A Festival of American Orchestras" at Washington D.C.'s Kennedy Center in 2018. Miller established a family concert series shortly after his arrival at the Albany Symphony in 1992, and created a "Capital Heritage" commissioning series, for which the orchestra commissions and performs works inspired by New York Capital Region history. The works are performed "on location," in or at the locations that inspired them. "Capital Heritage" presentations have included performances inspired by Tiffany windows throughout the region, a day in the State Capital and a day at the Saratoga battlefield.

== Dogs of Desire ==
Formed by Miller in 1994, Dogs of Desire is an eighteen-member contemporary music ensemble composed of principal members of the Albany Symphony and two female vocalists. The ensemble has commissioned over 150 new works from emerging American composers and gained a national reputation among young composers as a proving ground for emerging talent. Composers who have been commissioned by the Dogs of Desire include: Derek Bermel, Arthur Bloom, Dorothy Chang, Jacob Cooper, Michael Daugherty, Kenneth Eberhard, Reena Esmail, Ted Hearne, David Lang, Loren Loiacono, Todd Levin, David Mallamud, Huang Ruo, Annika Socolofsky, Michael Torke and George Tsontakis. The Dogs and Miller have released CDs of works by Michael Daugherty on Argo and NAXOS, and by David Mallamud on Broadway Records.

== Guest conducting ==
Frequently in demand as a guest conductor, Miller has worked with most of America's major orchestras, including the orchestras of Baltimore, Buffalo, Chicago, Cleveland, Detroit, Houston, Indianapolis, Los Angeles, Milwaukee, Minnesota, Nashville, New York, Philadelphia, Pittsburgh and San Francisco, as well as the New World Symphony, the Boston Pops and the New York City Ballet. He has also returned to the Los Angeles Philharmonic on occasion to conduct them during their summer season at the Hollywood Bowl. Miller conducted the "Casual Classics" series for eight seasons with the Minnesota Orchestra.

Additionally, Miller has appeared frequently throughout Europe, Australia and the Far East as a guest conductor. Miller made his international debut with the RAI Orchestra in Turin, Italy, in the 1999-2000 season. He has also conducted major European orchestras in Berlin, Barcelona, Lisbon, London, Prague, Dresden, Hanover, Halle and Mainz. He has appeared with the Adelaide Symphony, Melbourne Symphony, Hong Kong Philharmonic, Singapore Symphony, National Orchestra of Taiwan, and the Vietnam National Symphony Orchestra; led the Australian Youth Orchestra on its European tour; and conducted the Asian Youth Orchestra on a major tour of the Far East that included concerts in Japan, Korea, Hong Kong and Singapore. In Canada, he has conducted the National Arts Center Orchestra and the Edmonton Symphony.

== Personal life ==
Miller is the father of three children, including orchestra conductor Elias Miller (associate conductor of the Columbus Symphony Orchestra) and livestreamer musician Ari Miller (known as ARIatHOME).

== Awards ==
Miller's recordings have been nominated for a total of nine Grammy Awards, winning two Grammys, and he has been personally nominated for a total of eight. He has also won a number of awards for his innovative programming and his commitment to performing and premiering modern and contemporary American works.

In 1999, Miller won ASCAP's first-ever Leonard Bernstein Award for Outstanding Educational Programming, and in 2001, he won the ASCAP Morton Gould Award for Innovative Programming. In 2003, he received Columbia University's Ditson Conductor's Award. This award is "the oldest award honoring conductors for their commitment to American music, (and) was established in 1945 by the Alice M. Ditson Fund at Columbia. Past recipients include Leonard Bernstein, Eugene Ormandy, JoAnn Falletta, Michael Tilson Thomas and James DePreist." In 2013, Miller won the John R. Edwards award for the nation's strongest commitment to new American music.

Miller received a Grammy Award in January, 2014 along with percussionist Dame Evelyn Glennie for their recording of John Corigliano's Conjurer with the Albany Symphony in the Grammy Award for Best Classical Instrumental Solo category.

Miller was nominated for a Grammy Award in 2015 along with soprano Talise Trevigne for their recording of Christopher Rouse's Kabir Padavali with the Albany Symphony in the Grammy Award for Best Classical Vocal Performance category. Miller was also nominated for a Grammy Award in 2018 for his Harbison, Ruggles & Stucky: Orchestral Works disc recorded with the National Orchestral Institute Philharmonic in the Grammy Award for Best Orchestral Performance category. He was nominated for a Grammy Award in 2019 along with violinist Tessa Lark for their recording of Michael Torke's Sky, Concerto for Violin with the Albany Symphony in the Grammy Award for Best Classical Instrumental Solo category.

Miller jointly won a Grammy Award in 2020 along with violist Richard O'Neill for their recording of Christopher Theofanidis's Concerto For Viola And Chamber Orchestra with the Albany Symphony in the Grammy Award for Best Classical Instrumental Solo category.

Miller was nominated for three Grammy Awards in 2026 for his work on the album Renewal - Music Of Viet Cuong, released by Albany Records. In the Best Classical Instrumental Solo category, Miller was nominated alongside Sandbox Percussion for Viet Cuong's Re(new)al. In the Best Orchestral Performance category, Miller was nominated alongside the Albany Symphony for Cuong's Oribital. In the Best Classical Compendium category, Miller was nominated alongside Jonathan Allen, Silas Brown, Victor Caccese, Viet Cuong, Ian Rosenbaum, and Terry Sweeney.

== Recordings ==
Miller has led many commercial recordings with the Albany Symphony and other ensembles. His extensive discography includes recordings of the works of Todd Levin with the London Symphony Orchestra for Deutsche Grammophon, music by Michael Daugherty, Kamran Ince, and Michael Torke for London/Decca, and of John Corigliano, Christopher Rouse, Michael Daugherty, and Luis Tinoco for Naxos. His recordings with the Albany Symphony include discs devoted to the music of John Harbison, Michael Torke, Viet Cuong, Roy Harris, Morton Gould, Don Gillis, Peter Mennin, and Vincent Persichetti on the Albany Records label. Miller's recordings with other ensembles include his Harmonia Mundi disc of Mel Powell's Pulitzer-Prize winning "Duplicates" with the Los Angeles Philharmonic, as well as projects with the Gulbenkian Orchestra of Lisbon and the National Orchestral Institute Philharmonic.

== See also ==
- Albany Symphony Orchestra
- Capital District
- Media in Albany, New York
