= Split (composition) =

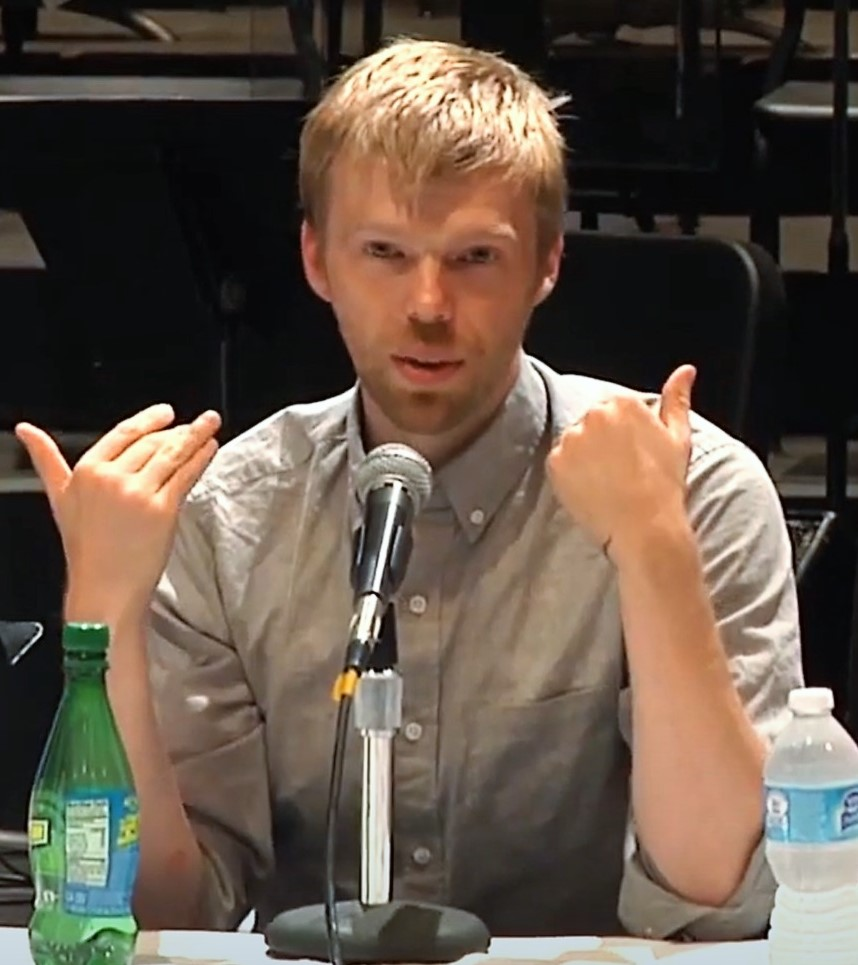
Norman speaks at the 2014 Cabrillo Festival of Contemporary Music

Split is a fantasy for solo piano and orchestra by the American composer Andrew Norman. The work was commissioned by the New York Philharmonic for the pianist Jeffrey Kahane. It was first performed in David Geffen Hall, New York City on December 10, 2015, by the New York Philharmonic and Jeffrey Kahane under the conductor James Gaffigan. A version for two pianos and orchestra premiered in April 2026 in performance by the Boston Symphony Orchestra.

== Composition ==
Split has a duration of roughly 25 minutes and is composed in one continuous movement.

== Reception ==
Split has received a very positive response from music critics. Reviewing the world premiere, George Grella of the New York Classical Review called the piece "a stellar work" and a worthy companion to Norman's 2013 symphony Play, adding, "Split is less manic than playful, and by repeating material that, if stitched together in linear form would make a long, connected line, the piece coheres through an accumulating collection of events." Grella continued, "It was a dazzling listen and great fun throughout. Kahane and the orchestra played with great agility and energy. This is music that showcases smarts as much as chops and the performance made every detail of composition and orchestration clear, even as things happened fast and furiously." Justin Davidson of New York lauded the piece for "a personality that feels, if not exactly unified, at least reassuringly whole." He remarked:

Norman wrote Split for the pianist Jeffrey Kahane, and treated his effervescent personality as a musical ingredient, sprinkling it throughout the score. The piece announces itself with a backwards pow!, a brief reverberation building to a fortissimo snap. Immediately, the piano sounds both assertive and comically lost, strumming a swaggering high-register chord, then plinking it out again and again, each time slower and more tentative. It takes the whack of a slapstick to kick the piece into gear.

Anthony Tommasini of The New York Times called the piece "audacious, exhilarating and, in a way, exhausting" and wrote:

There is constant variety: stretches in which a bout of pointillist-like notes are scattered across the orchestra, like a 12-tone Webern piece turned into music for a video game; episodes in which a briefly wistful piano engages in an almost tender exchange with a solo string instrument. Yet when the strings seem to buttress the piano during quizzical passages, it sounds as if they were just biding their time, plotting how to steal the idea and run with it.

In addition to praising the performance, Tommasini nevertheless added:

Mr. Kahane, true to form, played the daunting piano part with impish command and rich colors. Under Mr. Gaffigan, the orchestra entered readily into the game. But the question remains: Is this now Mr. Norman's style? Can he stick to an approach that results in such intentionally fragmented pieces, however riveting? Maybe, just to try it, he should compose an Adagio for Strings.
