= The Companion Guide to Rome =

Composition by Andrew Norman

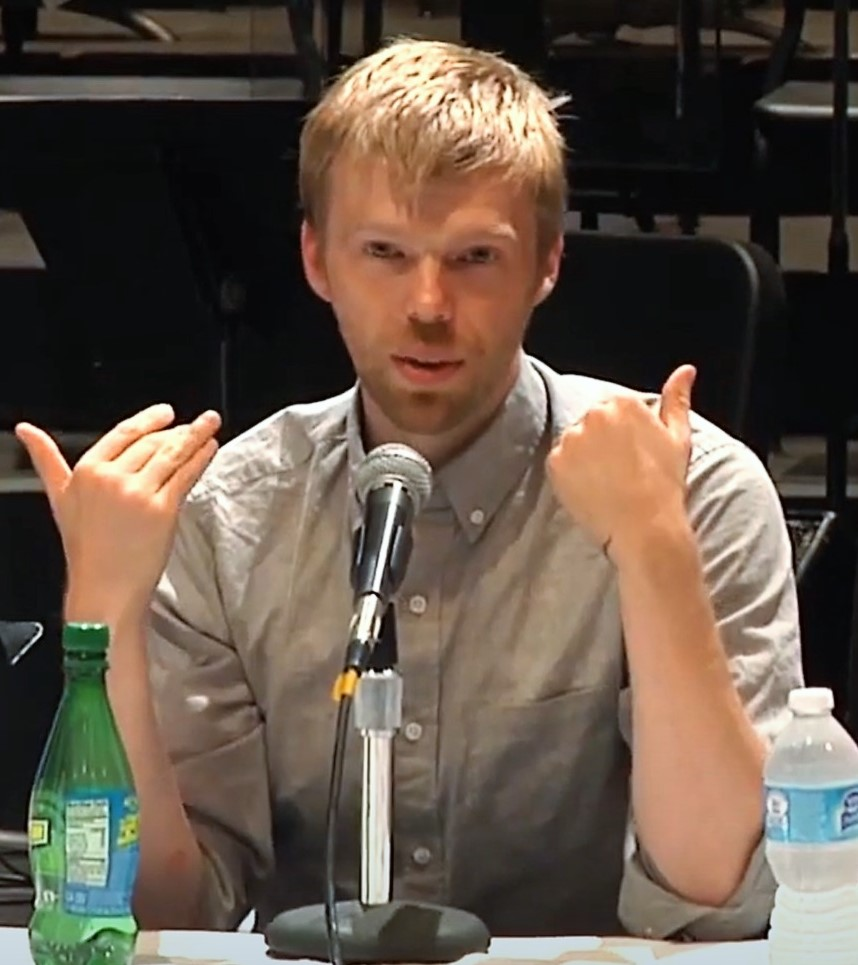
Norman speaks at the 2014 Cabrillo Festival of Contemporary Music

The Companion Guide to Rome is a composition for string trio by the American composer Andrew Norman. The complete work was first performed on May 30, 2010, by the Scharoun Ensemble at Radialsystem V in Berlin. The composition was a finalist for the 2012 Pulitzer Prize for Music.

== Composition ==
=== Structure ===
The Companion Guide to Rome has a duration of roughly 30 minutes and is composed in nine movements:

1. Teresa
2. Benedetto
3. Susanna
4. Pietro
5. Ivo
6. Clemente
7. Lorenzo
8. Cecilia
9. Sabina

The ninth movement, "Sabina," was originally composed as a standalone piece in 2006 for the Janaki String Trio. It can be performed separately or as part of the complete work.

=== Inspiration ===
The title of the work comes from the eponymous 1965 guidebook to Rome by Georgina Masson. The movements thus commemorate nine of Norman's favorite Roman churches mentioned in the text. Norman wrote in the score program note:

Like many of the buildings in Rome, this piece is the product of a long gestation marked by numerous renovations, accretions, and ground-up reconstructions. What has emerged is a collection of portraits—nine in all—of my favorite Roman churches. The music is, at different times and in different ways, informed by the proportions of the churches, the qualities of their surfaces, the patterns in their floors, the artwork on their walls, and the lives and legends of the saints whose names they bear. The more I worked on these miniatures, the less they had to do with actual buildings and the more they became character studies of imaginary people, my companions for a year of living in the Eternal City.

The inspiration for each movement is as follows:

1. Teresa: The Ecstasy of Saint Teresa by Gian Lorenzo Bernini in the Cornaro Chapel, Santa Maria della Vittoria, Rome
2. Benedetto: the Cosmatesque floors in San Benedetto in Piscinula
3. Susanna: a fresco of the Mary in Majesty in the Chiesa di Santa Susanna
4. Pietro: Donato Bramante's Tempietto
5. Ivo: Sant’Ivo alla Sapienza
6. Clemente: Basilica di San Clemente
7. Lorenzo: a part of the Cosmatesque floor in the Basilica Papale di San Lorenzo fuori la mura
8. Cecilia: The statue of St. Cecelia by Stefano Maderno in Santa Cecilia in Trastevere
9. Sabina: Santa Sabina
