= Spiral (Norman) =

Composition by Andrew Norman

- by Andrew Norman
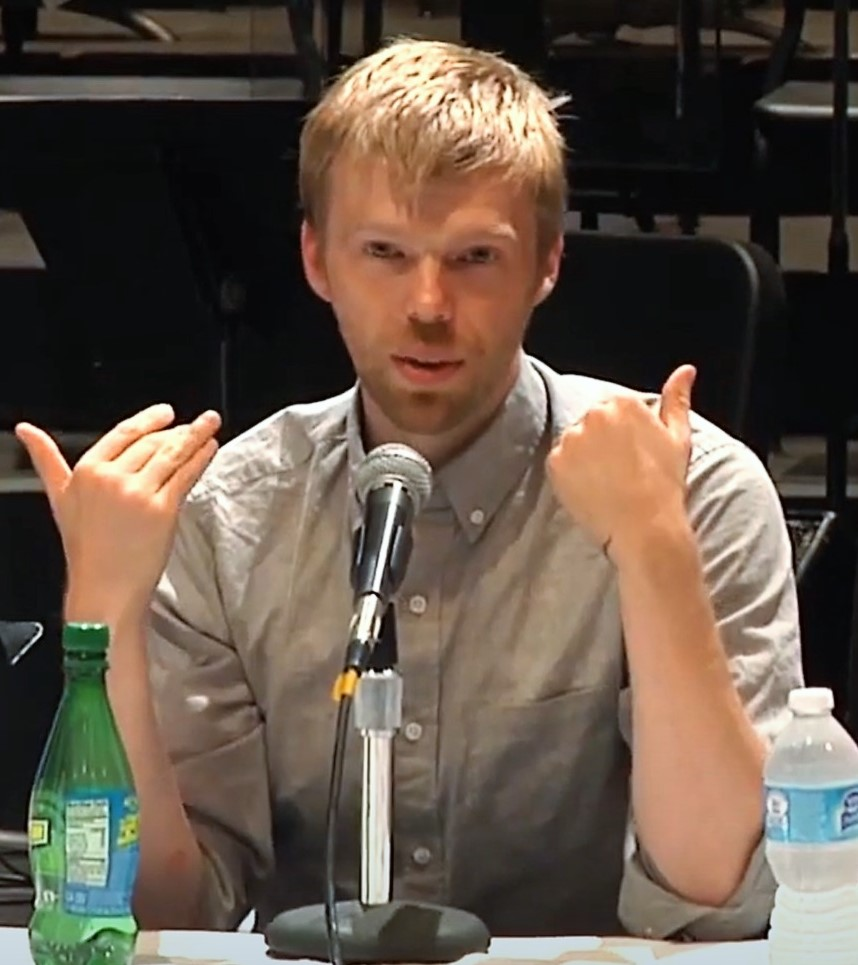
- Norman speaks at the 2014 Cabrillo Festival of Contemporary Music
- Period: Contemporary
- Composed: 2018
- Duration: c. 5 minutes
- Scoring: Orchestra

Premiere
- Date: July 14, 2018
- Location: Berliner Philharmonie
- Conductor: Simon Rattle
- Performers: Berlin Philharmonic

Spiral is a 2018 composition for orchestra by the American composer Andrew Norman. The work was premiered on July 14, 2018 by the Berlin Philharmonic, conducted by Sir Simon Rattle, and was commissioned for one of Sir Simon's last concerts with the orchestra. The piece is scored for a large orchestra and is about five minutes long.

== Commission and premiere ==
Spiral was commissioned by the Berlin Philharmonic Foundation to celebrate Sir Simon Rattle's final season with the orchestra. It was part of their "tapas" series of short commissions, intended as an introduction to contemporary music. The work received its premiere on July 14, 2018 in the Berliner Philharmonie, performed by the Berlin Philharmonic and Simon Rattle.

== Composition ==
Spiral is a short orchestral piece, lasting about five minutes. Norman has described it as "a short piece that traces the transformations of a small number of instrumental gestures as they orbit each other in ever-contracting circles".

The piece's title is a reference to its form, which presents the same thematic material in cycles that become faster as the piece continues. Norman has said that he had been considering the idea of a "spiral-shaped" orchestral piece for some time; his later piece Sustain employs a similar structure, but on a much larger scale.

Norman has also said that certain ideas in the piece were directly inspired by his experiences with Sir Simon and the Berlin Philharmonic. In particular, he cites their "precision" and "unique physical energy".

=== Instrumentation ===
The piece is scored for the following orchestra:

Woodwinds

3 flutes
3 oboes
3 clarinets
3 bassoons

Brass

4 horns
3 trumpets
2 tenor trombones
1 bass trombone
1 tuba

Percussion

Percussion I:

2 crotales
4 high temple blocks

Percussion II:

2 almglockens
4 low temple blocks

Percussion III:

2 pitched gongs
4 log drums

Keyboards

piano

Strings

harp (with 6 pitches tuned a quarter tone flat)

16 violin I
14 violin II
12 violas
10 cellos
8 double basses
