= Grammy Award for Best Contemporary Classical Composition =

Honor presented to composers for quality contemporary classical music compositions

- Awarded for: Quality contemporary classical music compositions
- Country: United States
- Presented by: National Academy of Recording Arts and Sciences
- First award: 1961
- Currently held by: Gabriela Ortiz (Dzonot) (2026)
- Website: grammy.com

The Grammy Award for Best Contemporary Classical Composition is an award presented at the Grammy Awards, a ceremony that was established in 1958 and originally called the Gramophone Awards, to composers for quality works of contemporary classical music. Honors in several categories are presented at the ceremony annually by the National Academy of Recording Arts and Sciences of the United States to "honor artistic achievement, technical proficiency and overall excellence in the recording industry, without regard to album sales or chart position".

The award was first presented in 1961 to Aaron Copland for his Orchestral Suite from The Tender Land Suite. It was not presented from 1967 to 1984. The Grammy is awarded to the composer(s) and the librettist (if applicable) of a classical piece composed in the last 25 years, and released for the first time during the eligibility year. The performing artist, orchestra, ensemble, etc., do not receive a Grammy (except if the performer is also the composer). Since its inception, the award has had several minor name changes. (Note: From 1961 to 1962 the award was known as Best Contemporary Classical Composition; In 1963 it was awarded as Best Contemporary Composition; In 1965 it was awarded as Best Composition by a Contemporary Composer; In 1966 and 1964 it was awarded as Best Composition by a Contemporary Classical Composer; In 1985 it was awarded as Best New Classical Composition; From 1986 to 1994 it was again awarded as Best Contemporary Composition; From 1995 to 2011 it was again awarded as Best Classical Contemporary Composition; In 2012 the category was renamed into Best Contemporary Classical Composition)

Composers John Adams, Samuel Barber, John Corigliano and Jennifer Higdon are tied for the most wins in this category, with three each. Multiple composers have won twice: Michael Daugherty, Krzysztof Penderecki, Christopher Rouse and Igor Stravinsky. In one year, 1962, the award was given to two composers, Laurindo Almeida and Stravinsky.

== Recipients ==
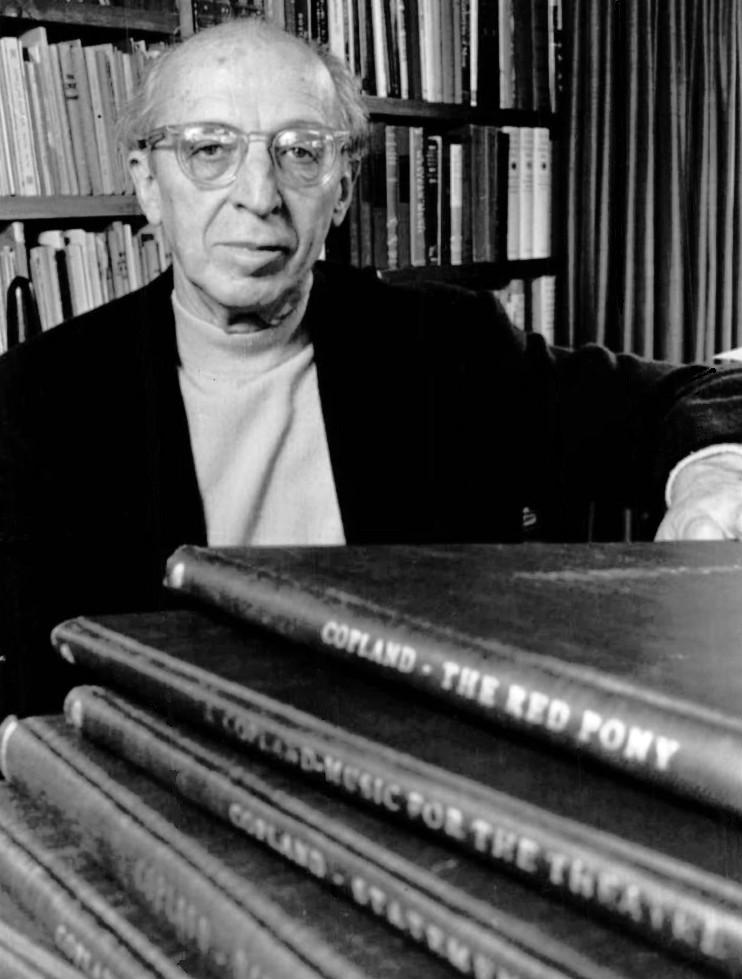
Aaron Copland was the first recipient of the award.

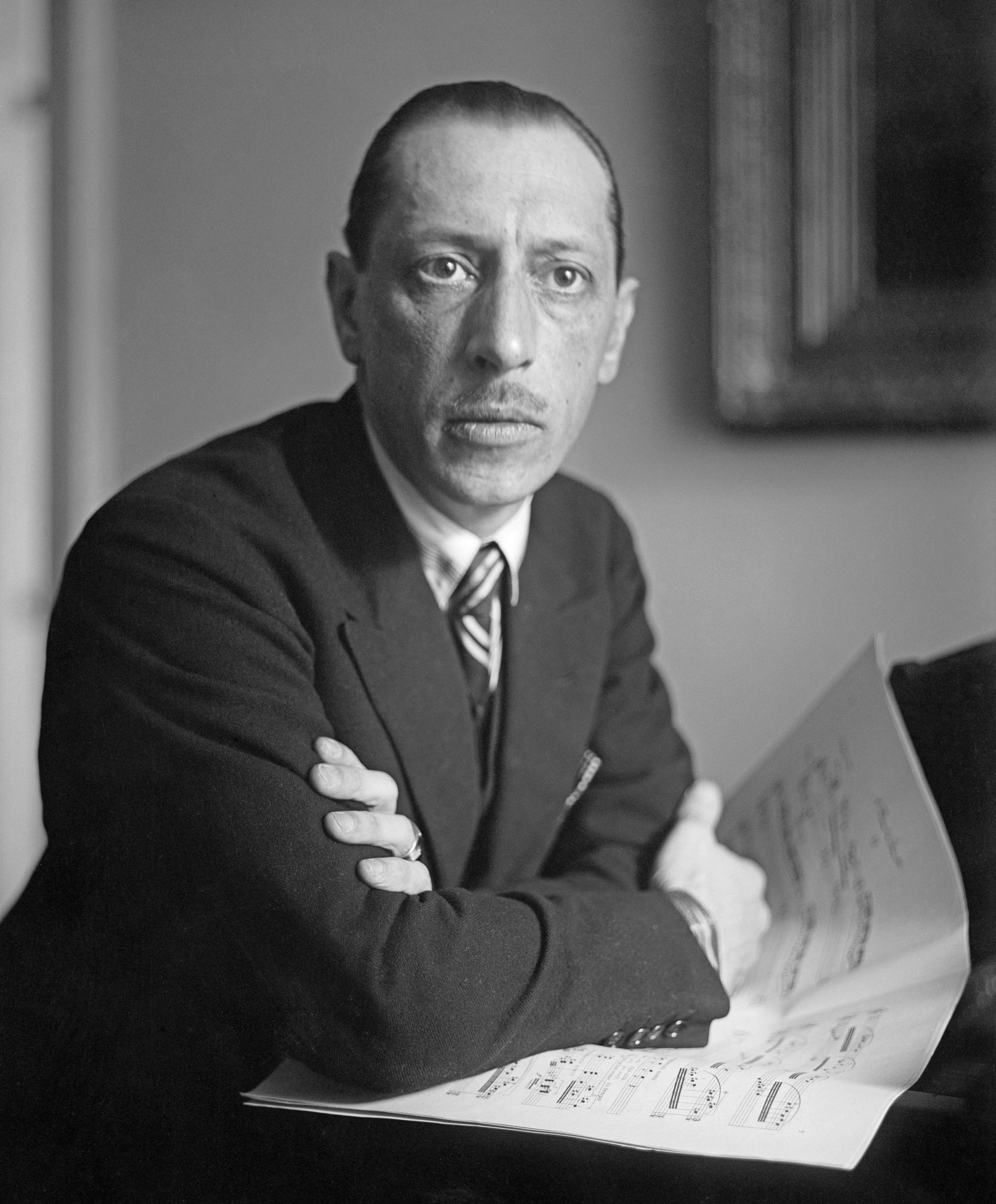
The composer Igor Stravinsky won in 1962 and 1963.

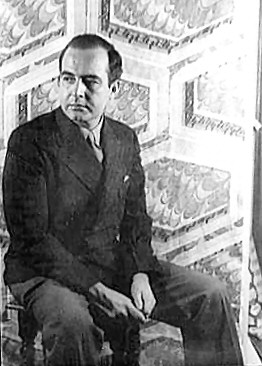
Three-time winner Samuel Barber (photograph by Carl Van Vechten).

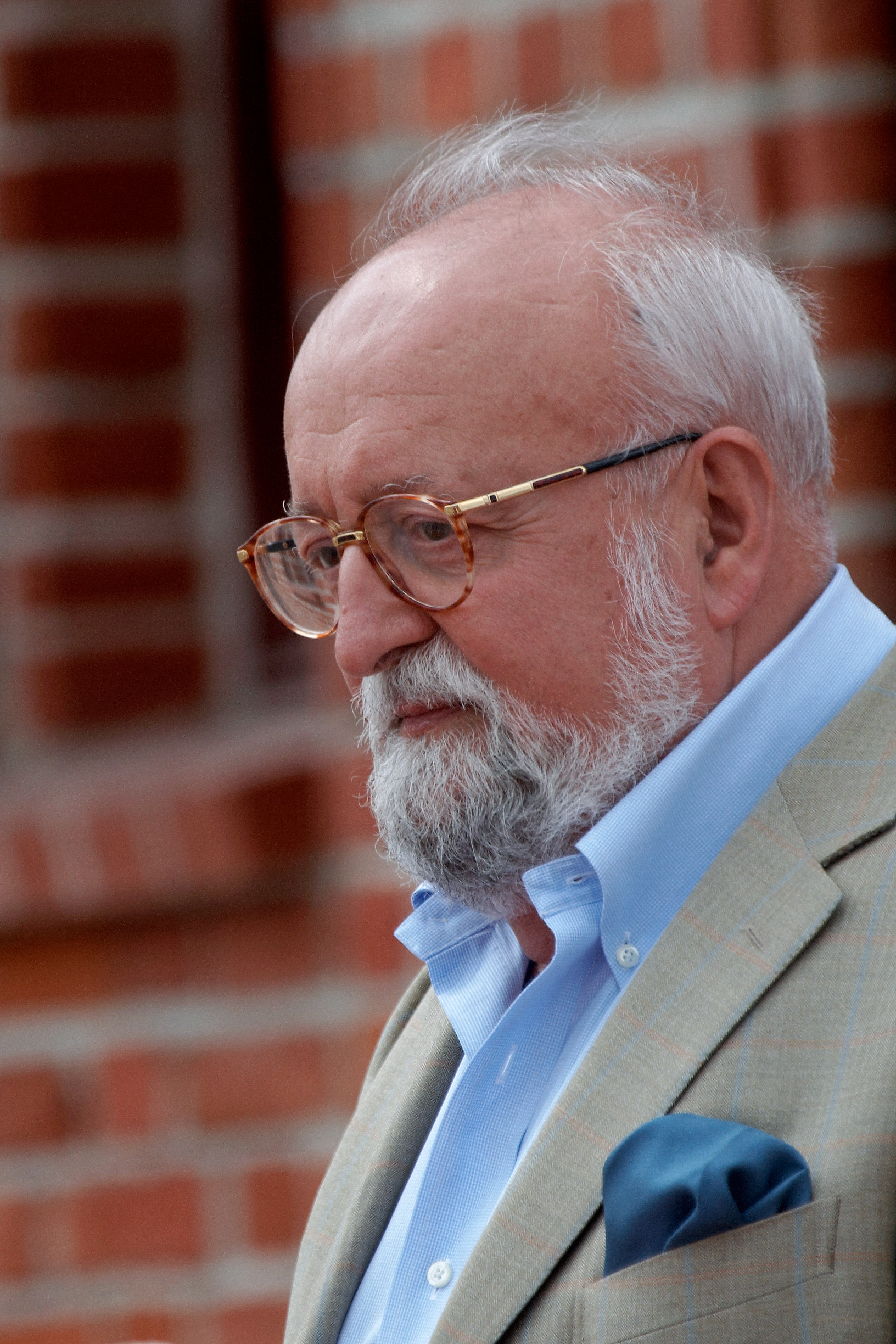
The composer Krzysztof Penderecki, the winner in 1988 and 1999.

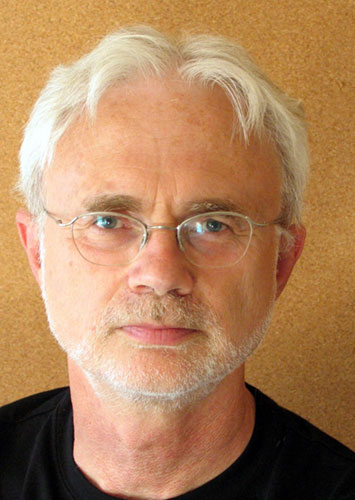
Three-time winner John Adams.

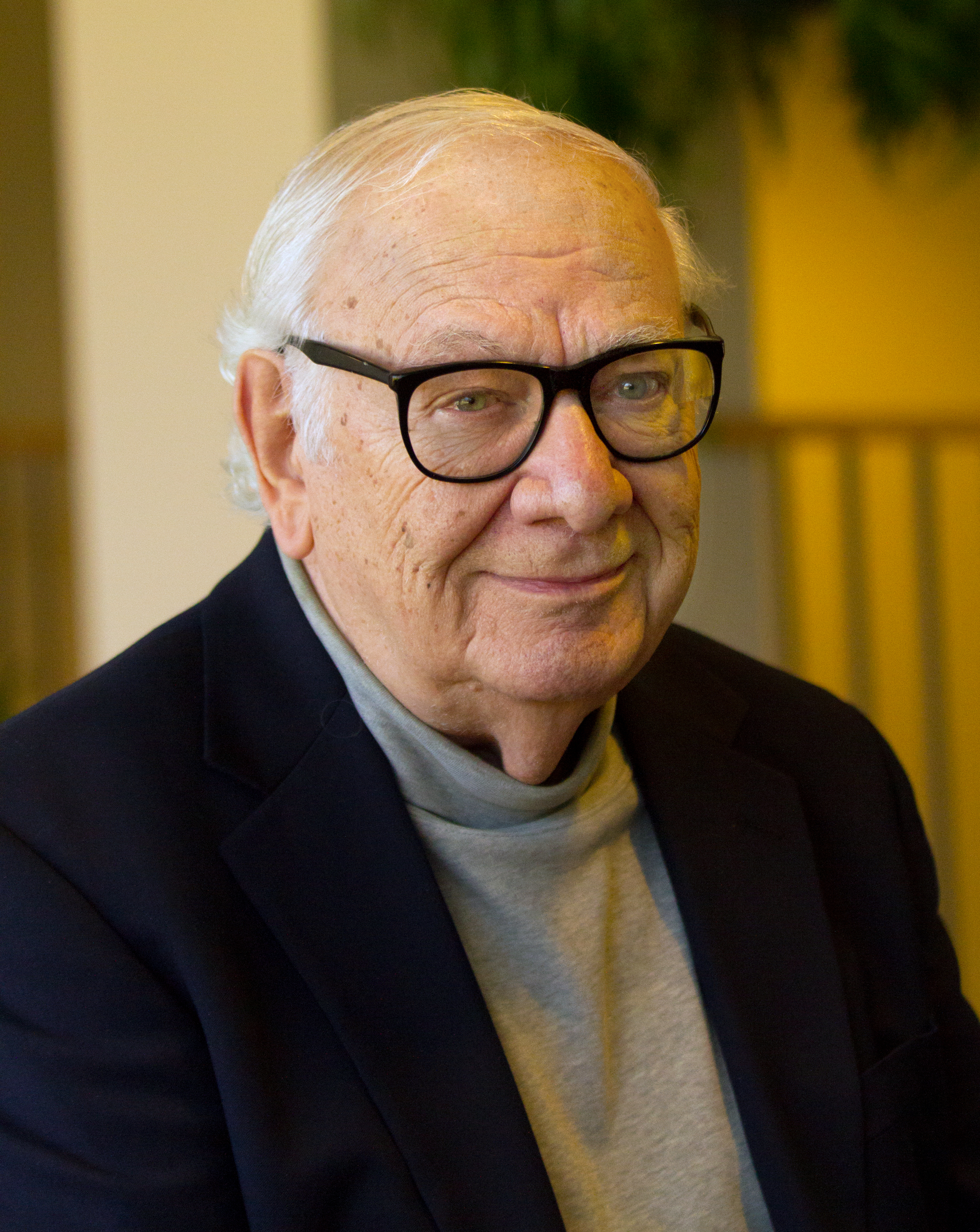
2004 winner Dominick Argento.

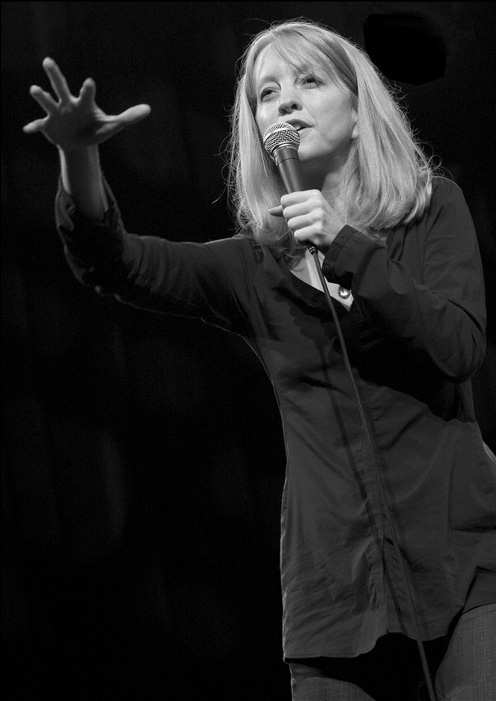
2014 winner Maria Schneider.

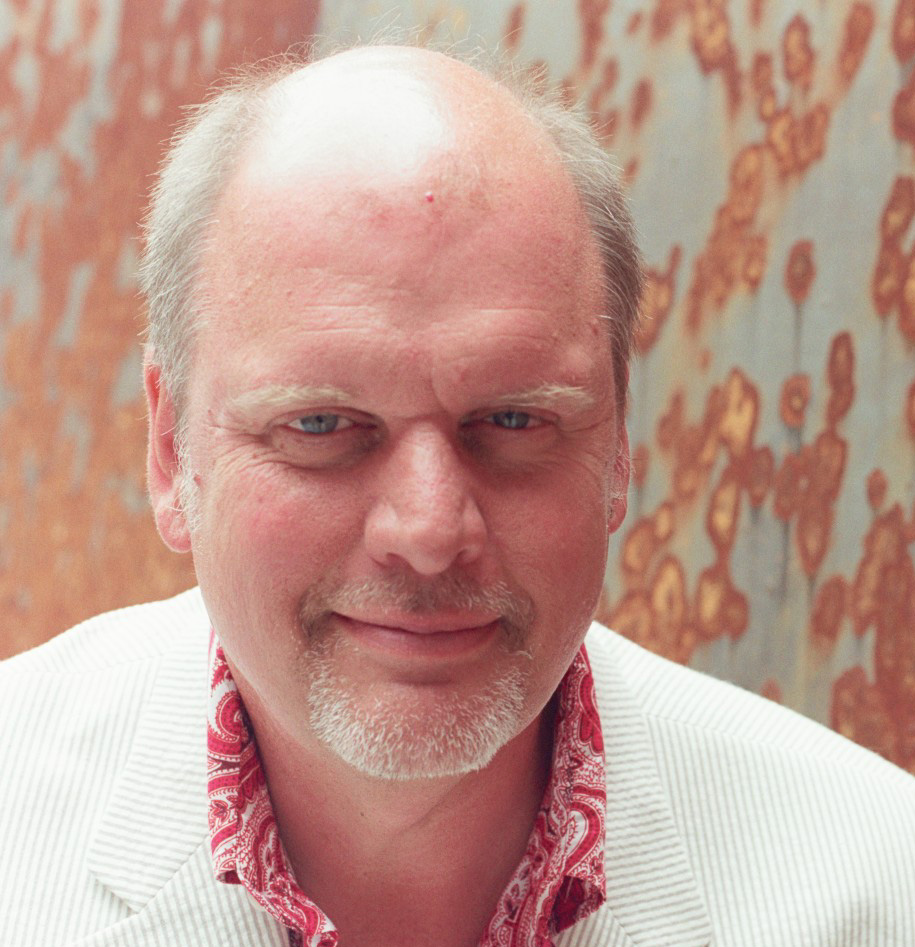
The composer Michael Daugherty who won in 2011 and 2017.

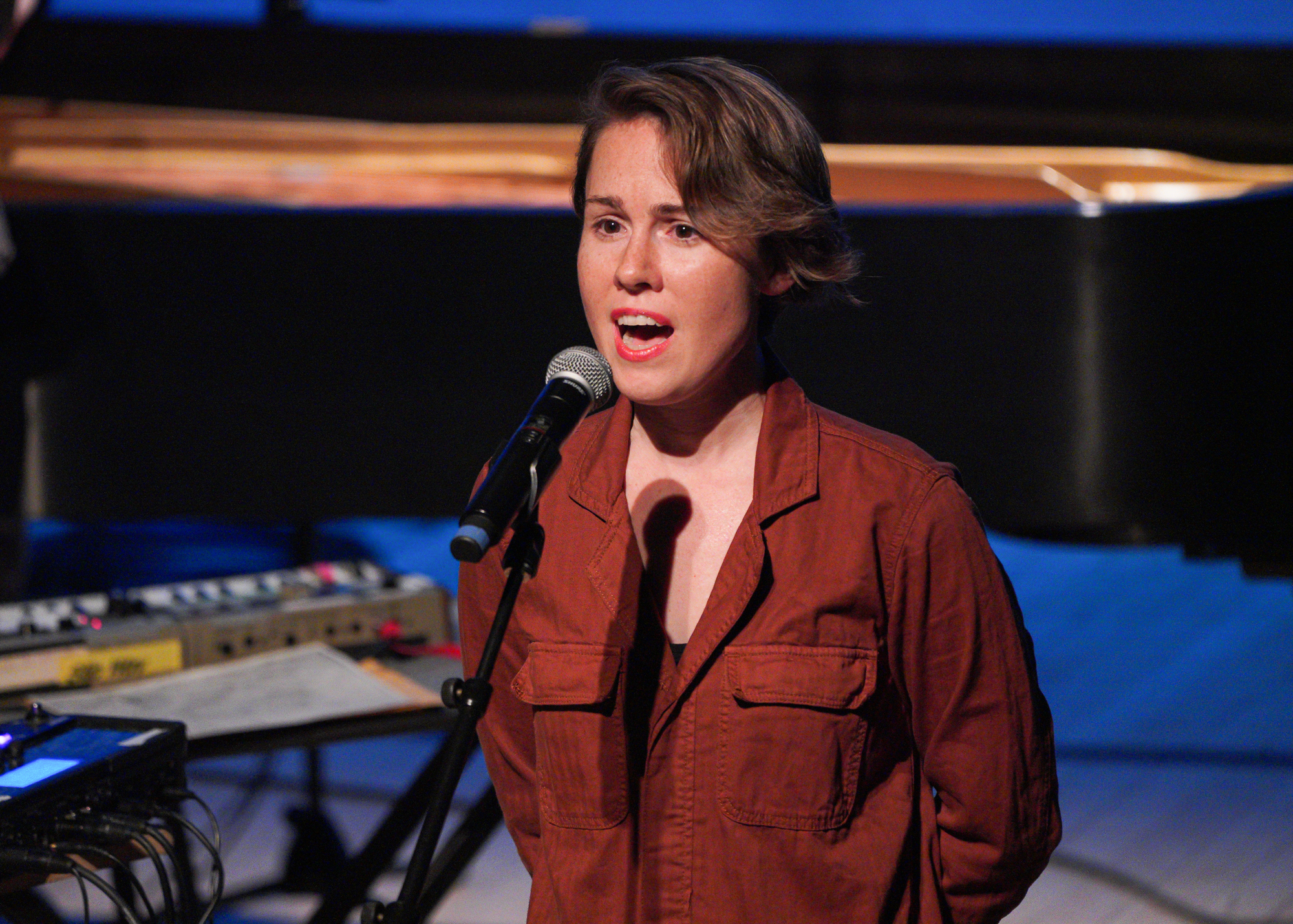
2022 winner, Caroline Shaw

Grammy Award for Best Contemporary Classical Composition
Year	Composer	Work	Nominees
1961	Aaron Copland	Orchestral Suite from The Tender Land	Easley Blackwood Jr. – Symphony No. 1; Paul Hindemith – Sonata For Cello And Piano; Charles Ives – Symphony No. 2; Francis Poulenc – La voix humaine; Roger Sessions – Symphony No. 1; Igor Stravinsky – Threni; Edgard Varèse – Density 21.5
1962	Laurindo Almeida	Discantus	Francis Poulenc – Gloria In G Major; Elliott Carter – String Quartet No. 2; Gunther Schuller – Music For Brass Quintet
1962	Igor Stravinsky	Movements for Piano and Orchestra	Francis Poulenc – Gloria In G Major; Elliott Carter – String Quartet No. 2; Gunther Schuller – Music For Brass Quintet
1963	Igor Stravinsky	The Flood: A Musical Play	Edgard Varèse – Arcana; Aaron Copland – Connotations; Benjamin Britten – Noye's Fludde; Lukas Foss – Song Of Songs; William Walton – Symphony No. 2; Lukas Foss – Time Cycle
1964	Benjamin Britten	War Requiem	Samuel Barber – Andromache's Farewell; John La Montaine – Concerto For Piano; Heitor Villa-Lobos – Cello Concerto No. 2; Dmitri Shostakovich – Symphony No. 4; William Schuman – Symphony No. 8
1965	Samuel Barber	Piano Concerto	Darius Milhaud – A Frenchman In New York; Charles Ives – A Symphony: New England Holidays; Igor Stravinsky – A Sermon, a Narrative and a Prayer; Leonard Bernstein – Symphony No. 3 "Kaddish"
1966	Charles Ives	Symphony No. 4	Leonard Bernstein – Chichester Psalms; Benjamin Britten – Cantata misericordium; David Diamond – String Quartet No. 4; Morton Gould – World War I Suite; William Walton – Variations on a Theme by Hindemith
Award not presented from 1967 to 1984
1985	Samuel Barber	Antony and Cleopatra	Morton Gould – Apple Waltzes; Joseph Schwantner – Magabunda "Four poems of Agueda Pizarro"; Frank Zappa – "The Perfect Stranger"; Vincent Persichetti – Winter Cantata
1986	Andrew Lloyd Webber	Requiem	John Adams – Harmonium; Philip Glass – Satyagraha; George Perle – Serenade No. 3 For Piano And Chamber Orchestra; Robert Starer – Violin Concerto
1987	Witold Lutosławski	Symphony No. 3	Robert Beaser – Mountain Songs: A Cycle Of American Folk Music; Chick Corea – Septet; Philip Glass – String Quartet No. 2, Company; Ellen Taaffe Zwilich – Symphony No. 1
1988	Krzysztof Penderecki	Cello Concerto No. 2	John Adams – The Chairman Dances; Milton Babbitt – Piano Concerto; Joseph Schwantner – A Sudden Rainbow; Roger Sessions – Symphony No. 5; Michael Tippett – The Mask Of Time
1989	John Adams	Nixon in China	Leonard Bernstein and Stephen Wadsworth – A Quiet Place; William Bolcom – Symphony No. 4; Ned Rorem – String Symphony; Karlheinz Stockhausen – Amour
1990	Steve Reich	Different Trains	Sofia Gubaidulina – Offertorium; Witold Lutosławski – Chain 2; Witold Lutosławski – Partita; Arvo Pärt – Passio
1991	Leonard Bernstein	Arias and Barcarolles	John Adams – The Wound-Dresser; Henri Lazarof – Tableaux (After Kandinsky) For Piano And Orchestra; Terry Riley – Salome Dances For Peace; Ellen Taaffe Zwilich – Symphony No. 2
1992	John Corigliano	Symphony No. 1	Elliott Carter – Oboe Concerto; Nicholas Maw – Odyssey; Arvo Pärt – Miserere; Dominick Argento – Te Deum
1993	Samuel Barber	The Lovers	Anthony Davis – X, The Life and Times of Malcolm X; Witold Lutosławski – Piano Concerto; John Tavener – The Protecting Veil; Ellen Taaffe Zwilich – Flute Concerto
1994	Elliott Carter	Violin Concerto	Donald Erb – Cello Concerto; Tōru Takemitsu – A Way A Lone; Michael Tippett – Byzantium; William Bolcom – Orphee-Serenade
1995	Stephen Albert	Cello Concerto	György Ligeti – Piano Concerto; Witold Lutosławski – Symphony No. 4; Olivier Messiaen – Éclairs sur l'au-delà...; Tōru Takemitsu – Fantasma/Cantos
1996	Olivier Messiaen	Concert à quatre	Gunther Schuller – Of Reminiscences and Reflections; Ellen Taaffe Zwilich – Symphony No. 3; John Adams – Chamber Symphony; György Ligeti – Violin Concerto
1997	John Corigliano	String Quartet No. 1	John Adams – Violin Concerto; Colin Matthews – Fourth Sonata; Einojuhani Rautavaara – Symphony No. 7: "Angel of Light"; Gunther Schuller – Four Soundscapes
1998	John Adams	El Dorado	Lowell Liebermann – Concerto No. 2 For Piano And Orchestra; Per Nørgård – Symphony No. 5; Richard Danielpour – Concerto For Orchestra; Aaron Jay Kernis – Second Symphony
1999	Krzysztof Penderecki	Violin Concerto No. 2 "Metamorphosen"	John Adams – Gnarly Buttons; Elliott Carter – 90+; Arvo Pärt – Kanon Pokajanen; George Tsontakis – Ghost Variations
2000	Pierre Boulez	Répons	Aaron Jay Kernis – Air For Violin; John Tavener – Eternity's Sunrise; Thomas Adès – Asyla; Andrew Imbrie – Requiem
2001	George Crumb	Star-Child	Heiner Goebbels – Surrogate Cities; Nicholas Maw – Violin Concerto; Ned Rorem – Evidence Of Things Not Seen; Rodion Shchedrin – Concerto Cantabile
2002	Christopher Rouse	Concert de Gaudí	Poul Ruders – The Handmaid's Tale; John Tavener – Total Eclipse; Pierre Boulez – Sur Incises
2003	John Tavener	Lamentations & Praises	John Adams – Naïve and Sentimental Music; Osvaldo Golijov – Yiddishbbuk Inscriptions For String Quartet; Sofia Gubaidulina – Johannes-Passion; Arvo Pärt – Orient & Occident
2004	Dominick Argento	Casa Guidi	George Rochberg – Symphony No. 5; José Serebrier – Symphony No. 3; György Kurtág – Signs, Games And Messages; Benjamin Lees – Symphony No. 5 "Kalmar Nyckel"
2005	John Adams	On the Transmigration of Souls	Jennifer Higdon – Concerto For Orchestra; Tigran Mansurian – "... and then I was in time again"; André Previn – Violin Concerto; Valentyn Silvestrov – Requiem For Larissa
2006	William Bolcom	Songs Of Innocence And Of Experience	Carlos Franzetti – Corpus Evita; Ned Rorem – Nine Episodes For Four Players; Osvaldo Golijov – Ayre; Peter Boyer – Ellis Island: The Dream of America
2007	Osvaldo Golijov	Ainadamar	Elliott Carter – Boston Concerto; Christopher Theofanidis – The Here And Now; David Del Tredici – Paul Revere's Ride; James MacMillan – A Scotch Bestiary
2008	Joan Tower	Made In America	Joan Albert Amargós – Northern Concerto; David Chesky – Concerto For Bassoon And Orchestra; Jennifer Higdon – Zaka; Peter Lieberson – Neruda Songs
2009	John Corigliano	Mr. Tambourine Man: Seven Poems Of Bob Dylan	Marc-André Dalbavie – Flute Concerto; Michael Gandolfi – The Garden Of Cosmic Speculation; George Tsontakis – Violin Concerto No. 2; Chris Walden – Symphony No. 1, The Four Elements
2010	Jennifer Higdon	Percussion Concerto	George Crumb – The Winds Of Destiny; Arvo Pärt – In Principio; Roberto Sierra – Missa Latina 'Pro Pace'; Yehudi Wyner – Chiavi in Mano
2011	Michael Daugherty	Deus ex Machina	Hans Werner Henze – Appassionatamente Plus; Magnus Lindberg – Graffiti; Arvo Pärt – Symphony No. 4; Rodion Shchedrin – The Enchanted Wanderer
2012	Robert Aldridge	Elmer Gantry	George Crumb – The Ghosts Of Alhambra; Jefferson Friedman – String Quartet No. 3; Steven Mackey – Lonely Motel - Music From Slide; Poul Ruders – Piano Concerto No. 2
2013	Stephen Hartke	Meanwhile - Incidental Music To Imaginary Puppet Plays	Tania León – Inura For Voices, Strings & Percussion; Uģis Prauliņš – The Nightingale; Einojuhani Rautavaara – Cello Concerto No. 2 Towards the Horizon; Steven Stucky – August 4, 1964
2014	Maria Schneider	Winter Morning Walks	Magnus Lindberg – Piano Concerto No. 2; Arvo Pärt – Adam's Lament; Esa-Pekka Salonen – Violin Concerto; Caroline Shaw – Partita for 8 Voices
2015	John Luther Adams	Become Ocean	Anna Clyne – Prince of Clouds; George Crumb – Voices From The Heartland; Stephen Paulus – Concerto For Two Trumpets & Band; Roberto Sierra – Sinfonía No. 4
2016	Stephen Paulus	Prayers and Remembrances	Gerald Barry – The Importance of Being Earnest; Andrew Norman – Play; Joan Tower – Stroke; Julia Wolfe – Anthracite Fields
2017	Michael Daugherty	Tales of Hemingway	Jennifer Higdon – Cold Mountain; Christopher Theofanidis – Bassoon Concerto; Kip Winger – Conversations With Nijinsky; Mason Bates – Anthology of Fantastic Zoology
2018	Jennifer Higdon	Viola Concerto	Zhou Tian – Concerto For Orchestra; Adam Schoenberg – Picture Studies; Tigran Mansurian – Requiem; Richard Danielpour – Songs Of Solitude
2019	Aaron Jay Kernis	Violin Concerto	Jake Heggie – Great Scott; Missy Mazzoli – Vespers For Violin; Mason Bates – The (R)evolution of Steve Jobs; Du Yun – Air Glow
2020	Jennifer Higdon	Harp Concerto	Derek Bermel – Migration Series For Jazz Ensemble & Orchestra; Wynton Marsalis – Violin Concerto In D Major; Andrew Norman – Sustain; Caroline Shaw – Orange; Julia Wolfe – Fire In My Mouth Show
2021	Christopher Rouse	Symphony No. 5	Carlisle Floyd – Prince of Players; Ted Hearne – Place; Thomas Adès – Piano Concerto; Richard Danielpour – The Passion Of Yeshua
2022	Caroline Shaw	Narrow Sea	Andy Akiho - Seven Pillars; Louis Andriessen - The Only One; Clarice Assad, Sérgio Assad, Sean Connors, Robert Dillon, Peter Martin & David Skidmore - Archetypes; Jon Batiste - Movement 11
2023	Kevin Puts	Contact	Andy Akiho - Ligneos Suite; Derek Bermel - Intonations; Sofia Gubaidulina - The Wrath of God; Carlos Simon; Marco Pavé (librettist) - Requiem for the Enslaved
2024	Jessie Montgomery	Rounds	Thomas Adès - Dante; Andy Akiho - In That Space, In That Time; William Brittelle - Psychedelics; Missy Mazzoli - Dark with Excessive Bright
2025	Gabriela Ortiz	Revolución Diamantina	Andrea Cassarubios - Seven for Solo Cello; Valerie Coleman - Revelry; David Lang - Composition as Explanation; Kaija Saariaho - Adriana Mater
2026	Gabriela Ortiz	Dzonot	Christopher Cerrone - Don't Look Down; Donnacha Denehy - Land of Winter; Tania León - Raíces (Origins); Shawn E. Okpebholo - Songs in Flight
2027	TBA on 7 February 2027		Mason Bates - The Amazing Adventures of Kavalier & Clay; Anthony Davis - The Central Park Five; Donnacha Denehy - Violin Concerto; Sarah Kirkland Snider - Forward Into Light; Curtis Stewart - 24 American Caprices
