= Andrew Norman =

American composer (born 1979)

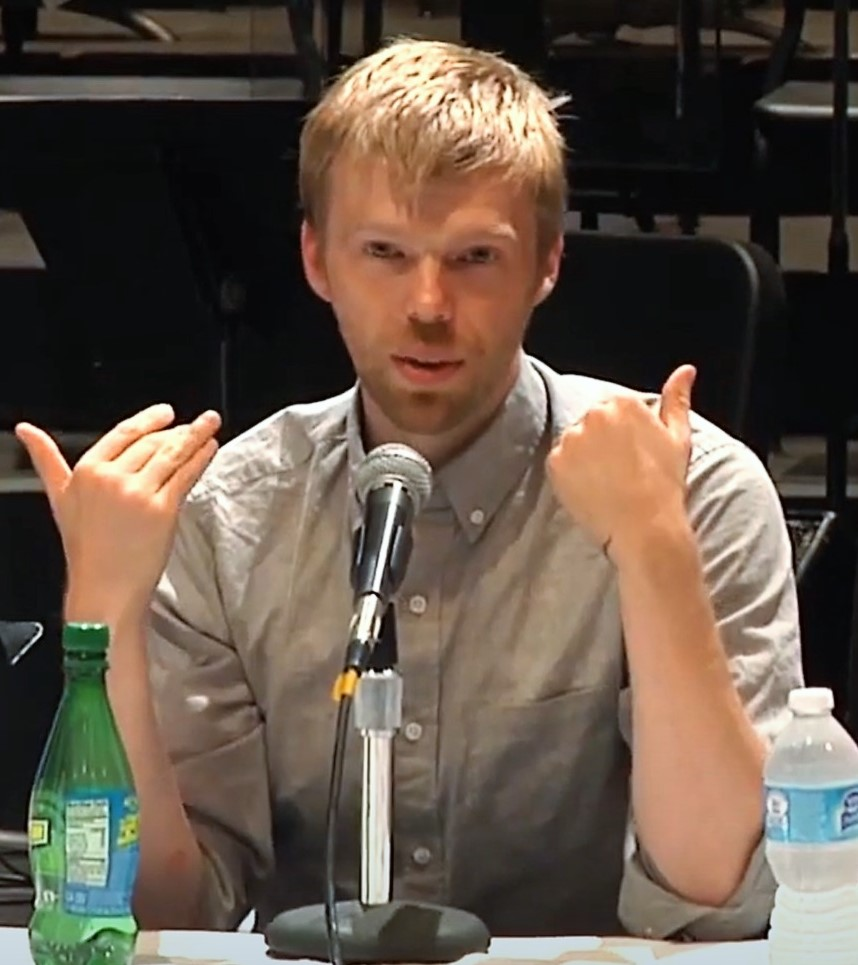
Norman speaks at the 2014 Cabrillo Festival of Contemporary Music

Andrew Norman (born October 31, 1979) is an American composer of contemporary classical music whose texturally complex music is influenced by architecture and the visual arts.

His string trio The Companion Guide to Rome (2010), was a runner-up for the 2012 Pulitzer Prize for Music. While composer-in-residence for the Boston Modern Orchestra Project, he first gained international attention for the orchestral work Play (2013), which was nominated for the 2016 Grammy Award for Best Contemporary Classical Composition and won the 2017 Grawemeyer Award for Music Composition. He received another Grammy nomination for the orchestral work Sustain (2018), a commission from the Los Angeles Philharmonic. Other noted works include the fantasy for piano and orchestra Split (2015) and the opera A Trip to the Moon (2017).

Norman was on the composition faculty of the Juilliard School and is currently teaching at the USC Thornton School of Music.

== Biography ==
Norman studied composition at the University of Southern California's Thornton School of Music and Yale School of Music. Much of his music is influenced by architecture and visual arts, in which he has had a lifelong interest. He was composer-in-residence for the Boston Modern Orchestra Project from 2011 to 2013. Among his most notable works are the 2010 string trio The Companion Guide to Rome, the 2013 symphony Play, the 2015 fantasy for piano and orchestra Split, the 2017 opera A Trip to the Moon, and the 2018 orchestral work Sustain.

His composition The Companion Guide to Rome (inspired by the guidebook of the same name written by Georgina Masson) was a runner-up for the 2012 Pulitzer Prize for Music. A recording of Play by the Boston Modern Orchestra Project was named one of the best classical music recordings of 2015 by David Allen of The New York Times and nominated for the 2016 Grammy Award for Best Classical Contemporary Composition.

Norman won the 2017 Grawemeyer Award for Music Composition for Play, which the music writer Will Robin called "the best orchestral work that the 21st century has seen thus far". In reference to the prize, Norman said in an interview with NPR:

If I get more commissions, great, but maybe I can use this moment to talk about things that are important to me. Like to call attention to the fact that there are problems. For instance, this award has been given to three women out of its 30-year history. And to me that's kind of an issue. And in all honesty, I'm a white man and I get lots of commissions and there are systemic reasons for that, reasons we should all be talking about. There are so many talented composers out there. Rather than giving me another commission, why aren't we giving those people a commission?

In 2018, the Los Angeles Philharmonic commissioned Norman to write Sustain for the beginning of their centennial season. Norman was a finalist for the 2019 Pulitzer Prize for Music for the work. In 2020, it won him a nomination for the Grammy Award for Best Contemporary Classical Composition, and the Los Angeles Philharmonic won the Grammy Award for Best Orchestral Performance for their 2019 recording of the piece. He was a MacDowell Fellow in 2008, 2009, 2011, 2012, and 2014; and served as Carnegie Hall's Debs Composer's Chair for the 2020–2021 season.

Norman is currently on the composition faculty of the Juilliard School. He was an assistant professor of composition at the USC Thornton School of Music from 2013 to 2020, returning as an associate professor in 2023. He is also program director of the Nancy and Barry Sanders Youth Composer program at the Los Angeles Philharmonic. His works are published by Schott Music.

On October 31, 2020, 31 members of the Berlin Philharmoniker performed Norman's composition Sabina (arranged for string orchestra), described as "a sound painting full of iridescent reflections of light", at the Philharmonie in Berlin. The arrangement was commissioned by the Berlin Philharmoniker Foundation.

== List of compositions ==
=== Opera ===
- A Trip to the Moon, a Melodrama for Children (2017)

=== Chamber ===
- Light Screens (2002) for flute and string trio
- Farnsworth: Four Portraits of a House (2004) for four clarinets, flute, violin, piano, and percussion
- Gran Turismo (2004) for violin octet
- Garden of Follies (2006) for alto saxophone and piano
- The Companion Guide to Rome (2010) for string trio
- Try (2011) for large chamber ensemble
- Peculiar Strokes (2011–2015) for string quartet
- Music in Circles (2012) for flute, clarinet, trumpet, violin, viola, and cello
- Mime Mime Mime (2015) for flute, clarinet, violin, cello, piano, and percussion
- Frank's House (2015) for two pianos and two percussion

=== Orchestral ===
- Sacred Geometry (2003)
- Drip Blip Sparkle Spin Glint Glide Glow Float Flop Chop Pop Shatter Splash (2005)
- Unstuck (2008)
- The Great Swiftness (2010) for chamber orchestra
- Apart (2011)
- Play (2013, rev. 2016)
- Suspend (2014) for solo piano and orchestra
- Split (2015) for solo piano and orchestra
- Switch (2015) for solo percussion and orchestra
- Spiral (2018)
- Sustain (2018)

=== Solo ===
- Sabina (2008–09) for violin, viola, or cello
- For Ashley (2016) for solo cello

=== Vocal ===
- Lullaby (2007) for mezzo-soprano and piano
- Don't Even Listen (2010)
