= Sustain (composition) =

Composition by Andrew Norman

- by Andrew Norman
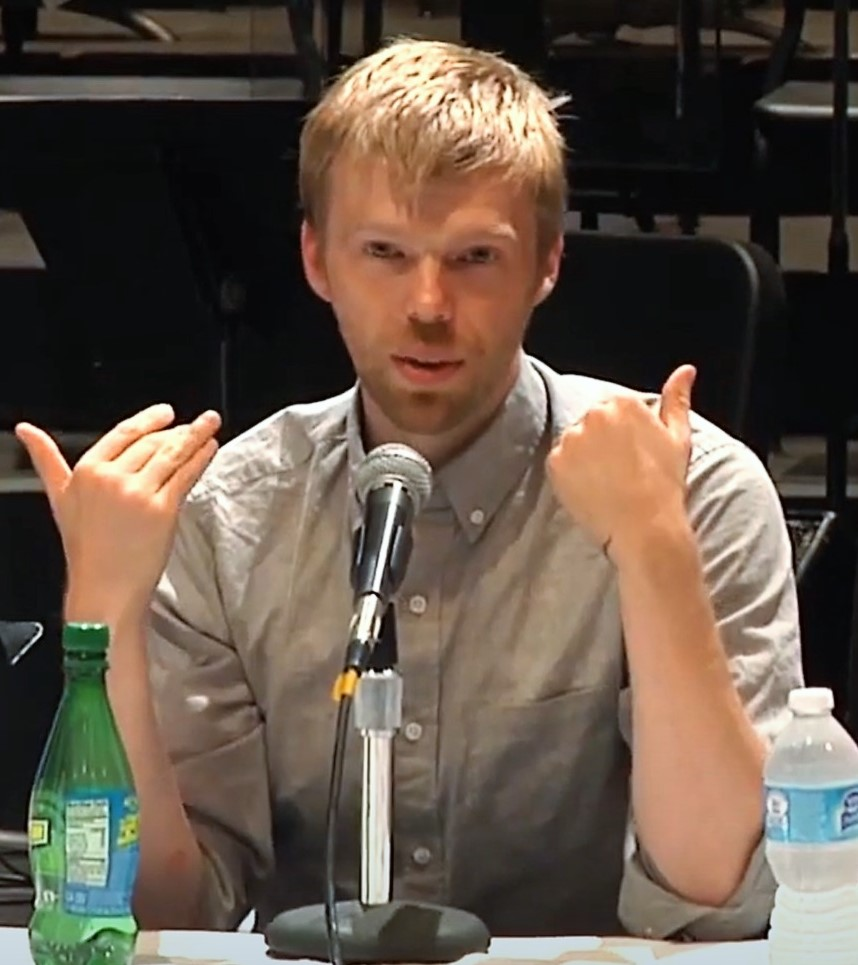
- Norman speaks at the 2014 Cabrillo Festival of Contemporary Music
- Period: Contemporary
- Composed: 2018
- Duration: c. 35 minutes
- Scoring: Orchestra

Premiere
- Date: October 4, 2018
- Location: Walt Disney Concert Hall, Los Angeles
- Conductor: Gustavo Dudamel
- Performers: Los Angeles Philharmonic

Sustain is a 2018 composition for orchestra by the American composer Andrew Norman. The work was premiered on October 4, 2018, by the Los Angeles Philharmonic, conducted by Gustavo Dudamel, as part of their centennial season.

== Composition ==
=== Inspiration ===
Sustain was commissioned by the Los Angeles Philharmonic for their centennial season. Norman has stated that he began by imagining what orchestral music will mean in the future, during the 200th season of the orchestra. Thus, the piece was conceptualized as "one long unbroken musical thought", focusing on the importance of communal listening. However, it eventually came to represent the Earth and the vast scale of geologic time.

Norman has explained in an interview that the title "Sustain" comes partly from his background as a pianist (in reference to the sustain pedal), and that it also relates to the idea that each note in the piece should have its own journey.

=== Structure ===
Sustain's form has been described by Norman as a "contracting spiral". It consists of ten cycles of the same music, becoming faster each time they repeat. Each cycle begins with a distinctive "signal" played by two pianos (tuned a quarter tone apart), followed by waves of sound in the strings. As the winds begin to interrupt, the music becomes more hectic and climactic, after which it fades and the cycle ends. The first cycle lasts approximately seventeen minutes, while the final spans mere seconds. Eventually, the orchestra is left in an unconducted, semi-improvisational section that slowly dies out, leaving the two pianos. The piece concludes with the pianos' signal, after which the strings mime (but do not play) a sustained note on their highest string.

A similar structure was used in Norman's earlier and shorter work Spiral. In describing that work, Norman said that he had been considering the idea of a "spiral-shaped" orchestral piece for some time.

=== Instrumentation ===
The piece is scored for the following orchestra:

Woodwinds

3 Flutes (3rd doubling piccolo)
3 Oboes
3 Clarinets
3 Bassoons

Brass

4 Horns
4 Trumpets
3 Trombones
1 Tuba

Percussion

Timpani

Bass drum
Bell tree
Crotales
Glockenspiel
4 Log drums
2 Suspended pieces of plywood
Tam-tam
4 Temple blocks
Vibraphone

Keyboards

2 Pianos (one tuned a quarter tone down)

Strings

Harp

16 Violin I
14 Violin II
12 Violas
10 Cellos
8 Double basses

== Reception and awards ==
The piece has been described as "sublime" by The New York Times, and as a "masterpiece" by both the Los Angeles Times and The New Yorker.

In 2020, Norman was nominated for the Grammy Award for Best Contemporary Classical Composition for the work, and the Los Angeles Philharmonic won the Grammy Award for Best Orchestral Performance for their 2019 recording of the piece. The composition was also a finalist for the 2019 Pulitzer Prize for Music.

== See also ==
- 2018 in music
- Contemporary classical music
