= Percussion Concerto (Higdon) =

Concerto by Jennifer Higdon

The Percussion Concerto is a one-movement concerto for solo percussion and orchestra by the American composer Jennifer Higdon. The work was jointly commissioned by the Philadelphia Orchestra, the Indianapolis Symphony Orchestra, and the Dallas Symphony Orchestra, with contributions from the Philadelphia Music Project and the Lacy Foundation of LDI, Ltd. The piece was completed in 2005 and is dedicated to the percussionist Colin Currie, for whom the concerto was written. The piece won the 2010 Grammy Award for Best Classical Contemporary Composition. That same year, Higdon won the Pulitzer Prize for Music for her Violin Concerto (2008).

In 2020, a recording of the concerto performed by Currie was selected by the Library of Congress for preservation in the United States National Recording Registry for being "culturally, historically, or aesthetically significant".

== Reception ==
The music critic Gregory Sullivan Isaacs of Theater Jones lauded the Percussion Concerto as "fascinating" and said it "makes wondrous use of percussion in all its wide spectrum of sounds." Tim Smith of The Baltimore Sun also praised the piece, saying, "Higdon unleashes a kinetic storm of urban beats, balanced by passages of Asian-influenced musings that exploit the most seductive qualities of the diverse percussion instruments assigned to the soloist." Smith continued:

Adding an unusual layer to the work is Higdon's decision to treat the orchestra's percussion section as a second protagonist. That means a whole lot of beating going on at times. The result is that the rest of the orchestra, all those strings and things, sometimes seems like an afterthought. But that doesn't much matter in the end, for the concerto is filled with absorbing musical ideas that are taken in interesting, often foot-stomping directions.

Conductor and frequent Higdon collaborator Marin Alsop wrote of the work, "In this concerto, you can hear the essential qualities about Jennifer as a composer and person — the music is direct, immediate and visceral with clear direction and shape, just some of the qualities that also define her as an 'American' composer." Alsop further remarked, "'Accessible' is often a dirty word in the world of art, but Jennifer embraces the concept and explains that a major priority for her is to give listeners a sense of grounding and a feel for where they are in her compositions. She is far less concerned with formality and technique than she is with the final test of a piece: how it sounds."

== See also ==
- List of compositions by Jennifer Higdon
