= Curtis Stewart (violinist) =

American violinist and composer

- Born: Helsinki, Finland
- Genre: Classical
- Occupations: Violinist, composer
- Instrument: Violin

Curtis Stewart is an American violinist and composer.

== Life and career ==
Stewart graduated from the Eastman School of Music and University of Rochester with a degree in mathematics and violin performance and from Lehman College with a master's in music education. He has soloed at Carnegie Hall, Lincoln Center, Kennedy Center, and the 2022 GRAMMY Awards, among many others.

Stewart founded the string ensemble PUBLIQuartet in 2010, was finalist at the Concert Artists Guild Competition in 2013. He taught music at the Fiorello H. LaGuardia High School, and the Juilliard School. He received the Centennial Award from the Eastman School of Music in 2022. He is currently the artistic director of the American Composers Orchestra.

== Selected discography ==
- Of Love (2023)
- Of Power (2021)
- Of Colors (2016)

== Awards and nominations ==
Year	Result	Award	Category	Work	Ref.
2027	Nominated	Grammy Awards	Best Chamber Music/Small Ensemble Performance	Rhythm Nation	
2027	Nominated	Grammy Awards	Best Contemporary Classical Composition	Stewart: 24 American Caprices	
2027	Nominated	Grammy Awards	Best Classical Instrumental Solo	Stewart: 24 American Caprices	
2026	Nominated	Grammy Awards	Best Classical Instrumental Solo	Coleridge-Taylor: 3 Selections From '24 Negro Melodies	
2025	Nominated	Grammy Awards	Best Classical Compendium	American Counterpoints	
2025	Nominated	Grammy Awards	Best Classical Instrumental Solo	Perry: Concerto For Violin & Orchestra	
2024	Nominated	Grammy Awards	Best Classical Instrumental Solo	Of Love	
2022	Nominated	Grammy Awards	Best Chamber Music/Small Ensemble Performance	What is American	
2021	Nominated	Grammy Awards	Best Classical Instrumental Solo	Of Power	
2019	Nominated	Grammy Awards	Best Chamber Music/Small Ensemble Performance	Freedom & Faith	
