= American Composers Orchestra =

Orchestra in New York City (founded 1975)

- Orchestra
- Short name: ACO
- Founded: 1975
- Location: New York City, U.S.
- Music director: Curtis Stewart
- Website: www.americancomposers.org

The American Composers Orchestra (ACO) is an American orchestra administratively based in New York City, specializing in contemporary American music. The ACO gives concerts at various concert venues in New York City, including:

- Zankel Hall at Carnegie Hall
- DiMenna Center
- Mannes School of Music
- Winter Garden at Brookfield Place
- Miller Theatre at Columbia University

== History ==
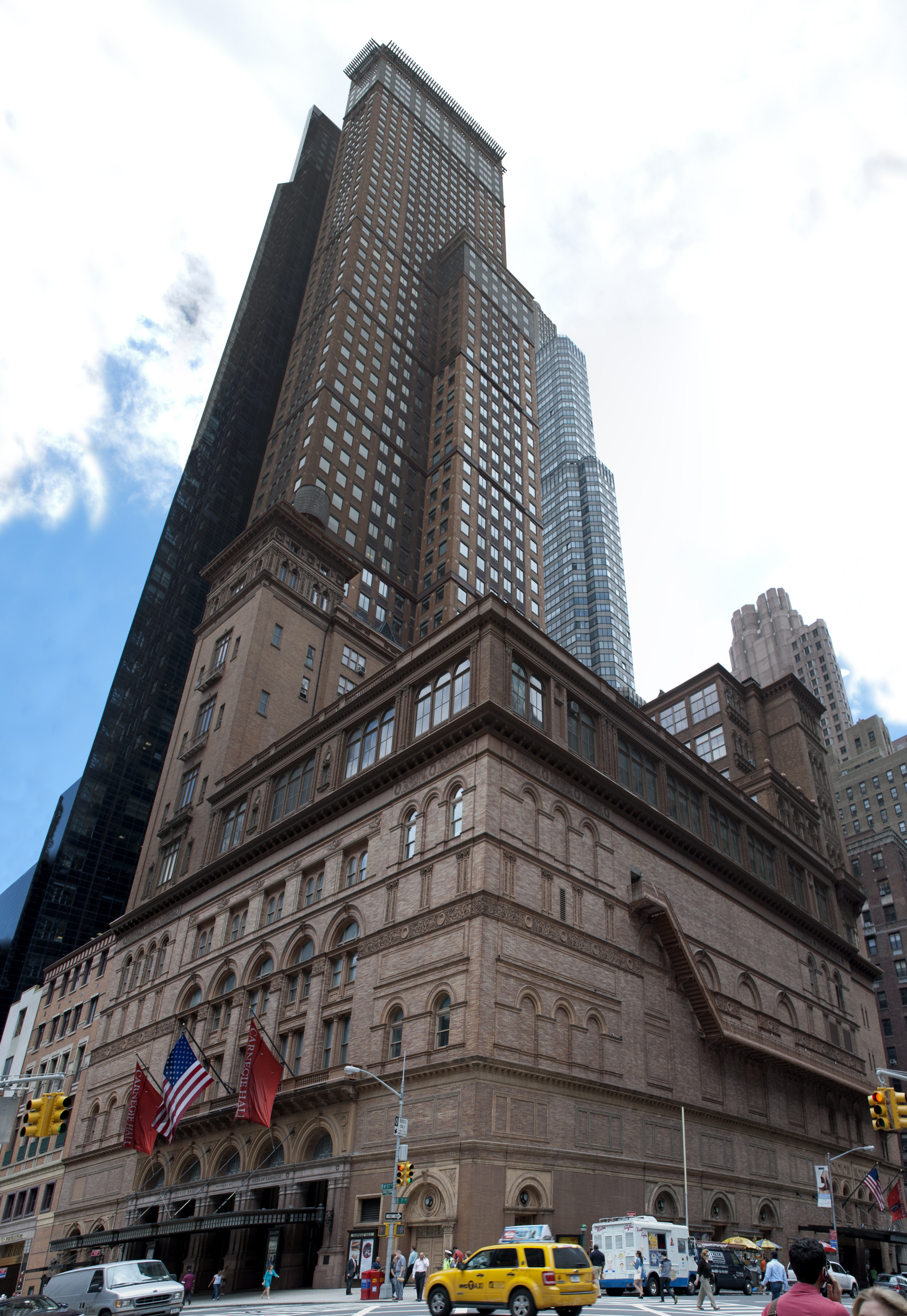
Carnegie Hall, New York City, U.S.

Francis Thorne, Dennis Russell Davies, Paul Lustig Dunkel, and Nicolas Roussakis co-founded the ACO in 1975. The ACO gave its first performance on February 7, 1977, at Alice Tully Hall at Lincoln Center. Davies served as the ACO's founding music director from 1977 to 2002 and now has the title of conductor laureate. In November 2000, Steven Sloane was named the ACO's new music director, effective with the 2002–2003 season. The appointment was unusual in that Sloane had not conducted the ACO prior to his appointment. Sloane's first conducting appearance with the ACO was in March 2002, and his ACO tenure began in November 2002. He held the post through 2006. In 2010, George Manahan became music director, after which, on 1 July 2021, he stepped down and took the title of music director emeritus.

The ACO is the only orchestra in the world solely dedicated to the creation, performance, preservation, and promulgation of music by American composers. ACO has performed music by over 500 American composers, including over 100 world premieres and new commissions. In the 1990s, the ACO added new initiatives such as the Underwood New Music Readings, for young composers to hear their works rehearsed and recorded, and the Sonidos de las Américas festival, focused on Latin-American music. In 2008, ACO expanded on the success of its Underwood New Music Readings to launch EarShot, the first-ever national partnership created to strengthen and support orchestras in their commitment to up-and-coming American composers and their music. Musicians of the American Composers Orchestra have included Eva Gruesser, Steve Lehman, Kelly Hall-Tompkins, Ethan Iverson, and Edward W. Hardy. Robert Beaser was the ACO's composer-in-residence from 1988 to 1993, then had the title of artistic adviser through January 2001, at which time he took the title of artistic director; he now holds the title of artistic director laureate. Derek Bermel was the ACO's composer-in-residence from 2006 to 2009 and from 2013 to 2022, artistic director. In December 2022, the ACO announced the appointment of Curtis Stewart as its next artistic director.

ACO has received a number of honors from the American Academy of Arts and Letters, BMI, and ASCAP for its programming. ACO also received the inaugural MetLife Award for Excellence in Audience Engagement, and a proclamation from the New York City Council. ACO recordings are available on the Argo, CRI, ECM, Point, Phoenix USA, MusicMasters, Nonesuch, Tzadik, and New World labels.

== Music directors ==
- Dennis Russell Davies (1977–2002)
- Steven Sloane (2002–2006)
- George Manahan (2010–2021)
