= Violin Concerto (Kernis) =

2017 violin concerto by Aaron Jay Kernis

Aaron Jay Kernis's Violin Concerto was written between 2016 and 2017 for the violinist James Ehnes on a joint commission from the Toronto Symphony Orchestra, the Seattle Symphony, the Melbourne Symphony Orchestra, and the Dallas Symphony Orchestra, with support of the Norma and Don Stone Fund for New Music. Its world premiere was performed by Ehnes and the Toronto Symphony Orchestra conducted by Peter Oundjian at Roy Thomson Hall, Toronto, on March 8, 2017. Kernis dedicated the piece to James Ehnes "with great admiration and friendship." The concerto later received the 2019 Grammy Awards for Best Contemporary Classical Composition and Best Classical Instrumental Solo.

== Composition ==
The concerto has a duration of roughly 32 minutes and is cast in three movements in the traditional fast–slow–fast form:

1. Chaconne
2. Ballad
3. Toccatini

The first movement follows the eponymous Baroque form of variations over a repeated series of chords. Kernis described the second movement as a "songful, jazzy, French-tinged lyrical middle movement with an angular, wrenching center." The final movement follows the form of a miniature toccata, about which the composer wrote, "the idea of creating a new martini – the Toccatini – helped get me through the post-election torpor of 2016." He added, "It's not atypical to find this type of mashup in my music, with bits of jazz, hints of Stravinsky and Messiaen, machine-music, and wild strings of notes all over the violin. It gives James ever more chances to show his mettle, and it showcases his great ability to shape many thousands of notes with air, joy and intensity."

=== Instrumentation ===
The piece is scored for a solo violin and an orchestra consisting of three flutes (3rd doubling piccolo), three oboes (3rd doubling Cor anglais), three clarinets (3rd doubling bass clarinet), three bassoons (3rd doubling contrabassoon), four horns, three trumpets, two trombones, bass trombone, tuba, timpani, three percussionists, piano (doubling celesta), harp, and strings.

== Reception ==
The violin concerto has received considerable praise from music critics. Melinda Bargreen of The Seattle Times described the piece as a "lengthy, complex and assertive" that "demands almost superhuman agility and stamina" of the soloist. She added, "Dotted with cadenzas that put the soloist back in the forefront, the concerto demonstrated Kernis' command of the complete orchestral palette, from cataclysmic brass passages to otherworldly solo harmonics over hushed strings. He made imaginative and inventive use of percussion, harp and tuba. And in the wildly eclectic third movement, Kernis pushed the soloist toward the frontiers of technique, with double-stop runs and a final cadenza so scarily difficult that audience members were gasping in disbelief." Scott Cantrell of The Dallas Morning News similarly observed, "The solo part demands jaw-dropping virtuosity. I wonder whether any other violin concert has such extensive double-stop writing — playing two strings at once, in rapidly shifting intervals, often at breathtaking speeds. Although there's lovely lyrical writing in the slow movement, much of the solo part scurries and leaps with abandon. The outer movements have unaccompanied cadenzas, the finale including skittering mixes of bowed and plucked notes."

Andrew Mellor of Gramophone was more tempered in his praise, however, remarking, "There’s some entertaining, dazzling, smile-inducing, toe-tapping music here but I can't give you a cast-iron promise that there's much more. Aaron Jay Kernis is the preeminent orchestral showman of the age and his meeting of minds with Heifetz's representative on earth James Ehnes has resulted in a concerto that goes through just about every motion possible."

== Recording ==
A recording of the violin concerto, performed by Ehnes and the Seattle Symphony conducted by Ludovic Morlot, was released through Onyx Classics on October 12, 2018.
