= Viola Concerto (Higdon) =

Viola Concerto by Jennifer Higdon

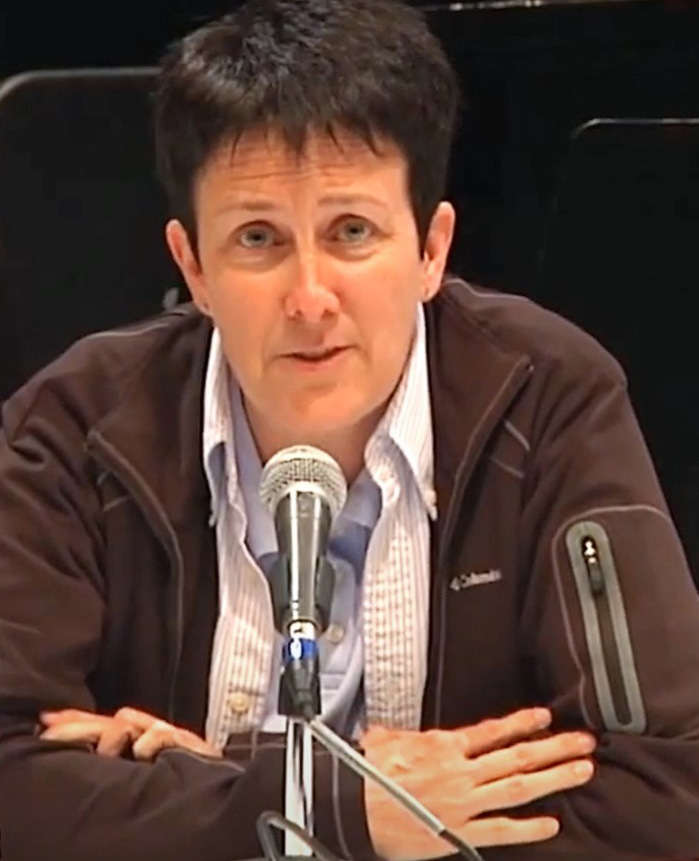
Jennifer Higdon in 2014

The Viola Concerto by the American composer Jennifer Higdon is a concerto for viola and orchestra in three movements. The work was jointly commissioned by the Library of Congress, the Nashville Symphony, the Curtis Institute of Music, and the Aspen Music Festival. It was premiered March 7, 2015 at the Thomas Jefferson Building in Washington, D.C., with conductor Robert Spano leading violist Roberto Díaz and the Curtis Chamber Orchestra. The work won the 2018 Grammy Award for Best Classical Contemporary Composition.

== Reception ==
David Patrick Stearns of The Philadelphia Inquirer praised the Viola Concerto as "unstoppable." Likewise, Lawrence Budmen of the South Florida Classical Review called it "splendidly crafted" and "a significant addition to the solo literature for the instrument." Joan Reinthaler of The Washington Post described Higdon's writing as "completely at home in her own idiom" and wrote, "The first of the concerto’s three movements opened with the deepest tones of the viola, exploring a slow melody, built to a martial, high-energy, brass-driven celebration that, having had its say, took a deep breath and calmed to a gentle string fuzz accompanying a sort of solo violin reminiscence." Reinthaler continued, "The urgent second movement drove the viola to technical challenges that Diaz navigated smoothly but without the bowing bite that the music seemed to imply. And the third movement that began with a broad, hymnlike accompaniment to some solo violin and cello interplay, ended in joyous and jazzy rhythmic counterpoint."

== See also ==
- List of compositions by Jennifer Higdon
