= Play (composition) =

Andrew Norman orchestral work

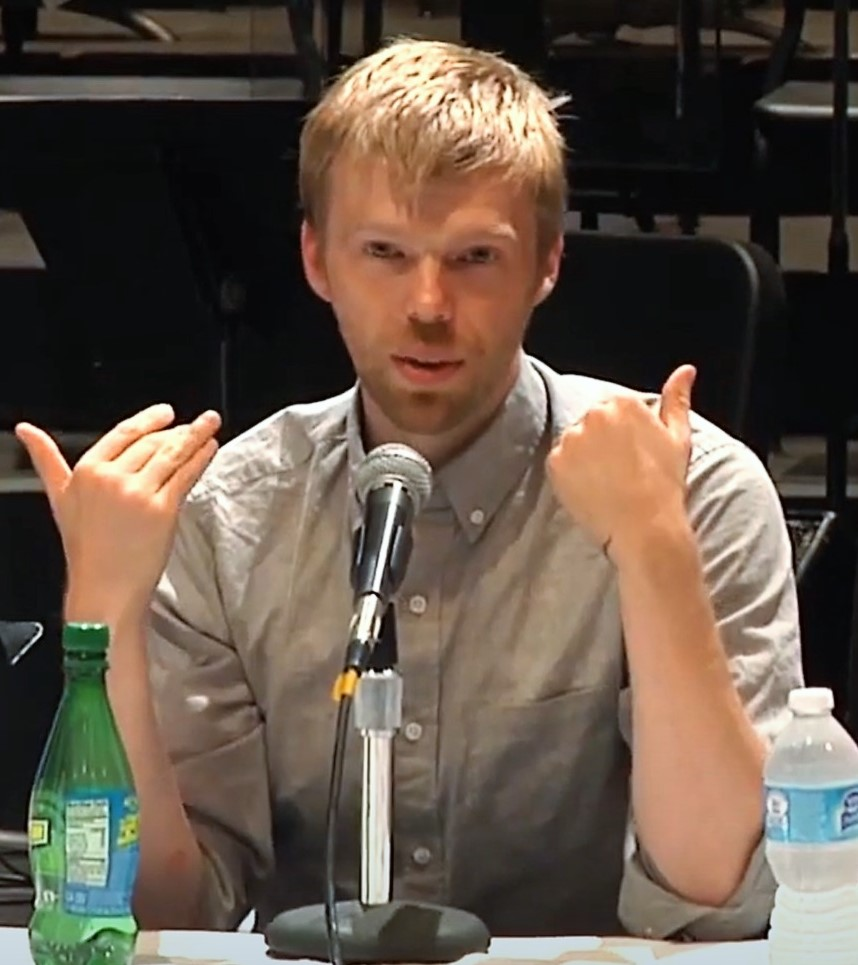
Norman speaks at the 2014 Cabrillo Festival of Contemporary Music

Play is a piece for orchestra in three movements by the American composer Andrew Norman. The work was commissioned by the Boston Modern Orchestra Project, for whom Norman was then composer-in-residence. It was first performed on May 17, 2013 by the orchestra under the conductor Gil Rose. The revised version was premiered by the Los Angeles Philharmonic conducted by Gustavo Dudamel on October 28, 2016.

== Composition ==
Play has a duration of roughly 45 minutes and is composed in three movements:

1. Level 1
2. Level 2
3. Level 3

Norman scholar and collaborator Anne Lanzilotti writes, "Structured in three movements—or 'Levels,' as they are titled—it is an intricately planned work dealing with themes of control, free will, hidden messages, and of course, playfulness. The key elements of Play are the things that inspire me in Norman’s music: physicality, the use of form to create narrative, and an interest in the experience of live performance."

The composition also utilizes various extended techniques for strings.

=== Instrumentation ===
The piece is scored for the following orchestra:

Woodwinds

3 Flutes (2nd and 3rd doubling piccolo)
2 Oboes
1 English Horn
3 Clarinets (3rd doubling E♭ clarinet)
3 Bassoons (3rd doubling contrabassoon)

Brass

4 Horns
3 Trumpets
2 Trombones
1 Bass trombone
1 Tuba

Percussion (4 players)

2 Vibraphones
4 Bongos
5 Temple blocks
3 Splash cymbals
5 Tin cans
Brake drum
2 Kick drums
Washboard
Tam-tam
2 Slapsticks
Crotales
5 Log drums
4 Opera gongs
4 Small tom-toms

Percussion (cont'd)

Spring coil
Triangle
Guiro
Tubular bells
Xylophone
4 Woodblocks
5 Cowbells
Ratchet
Bass drum
2 Glockenspiels
4 Suspended cymbals
Sandpaper blocks

Keyboards

Piano

Strings

16 Violin I
14 Violin II
12 Violas
10 Cellos
8 Double basses

== Reception ==
Play has received an extremely positive critical response. Reviewing the world premiere, David Wright of the Boston Classical Review wrote, "No matter how complex and seemingly chaotic the music became, Norman's contrapuntal skill and imaginative handling of the large orchestra were evident throughout." He added, "A single hearing can hardly do a piece like Play justice, but the work's ambition and brilliant performance earned it warm and prolonged applause." Reviewing a recording of the work, the music critic Alex Ross called it "a sprawling, engulfing, furiously unpredictable piece in three symphonic movements." Tom Huizenga of NPR similarly called it "witty, playful, surprisingly transparent — aside from the bazillion little things going on — and probably thrillingly difficult to pull off." David Weininger of The Boston Globe wrote:

Play [...] is being talked about as the most important long orchestral work of the 21st century. That kind of hype can often be misleading, but in this case it's quite likely accurate. The 45-minute, three-movement work, which encompasses various meanings of play — some lighthearted, some sinister — begins in an almost spastic fit of energy; musical ideas ricochet off one another furiously, almost too quickly. But embedded in the chaos are two scales: one ascending, the other descending. Their interaction and gradual transformation create the piece's overarching structure as the music progresses through three "levels," though it never loses its reckless feel.

In 2017, Play won the Grawemeyer Award for Music Composition.

== Recording ==
The Boston Modern Orchestra Project launched a Kickstarter campaign on June 13, 2013 to raise $8,000 for a recording of Play, in addition to Norman's orchestral work Try. The campaign closed on June 30, 2013 having successfully raised $9,525. A recording of the work was subsequently released through the orchestra's label BMOP/Sound. The BMOP recording was later named one of the best classical music recordings of 2015 by David Allen of The New York Times and was nominated for the 2016 Grammy Award for Best Contemporary Classical Composition.
