= Viet Cuong (composer) =

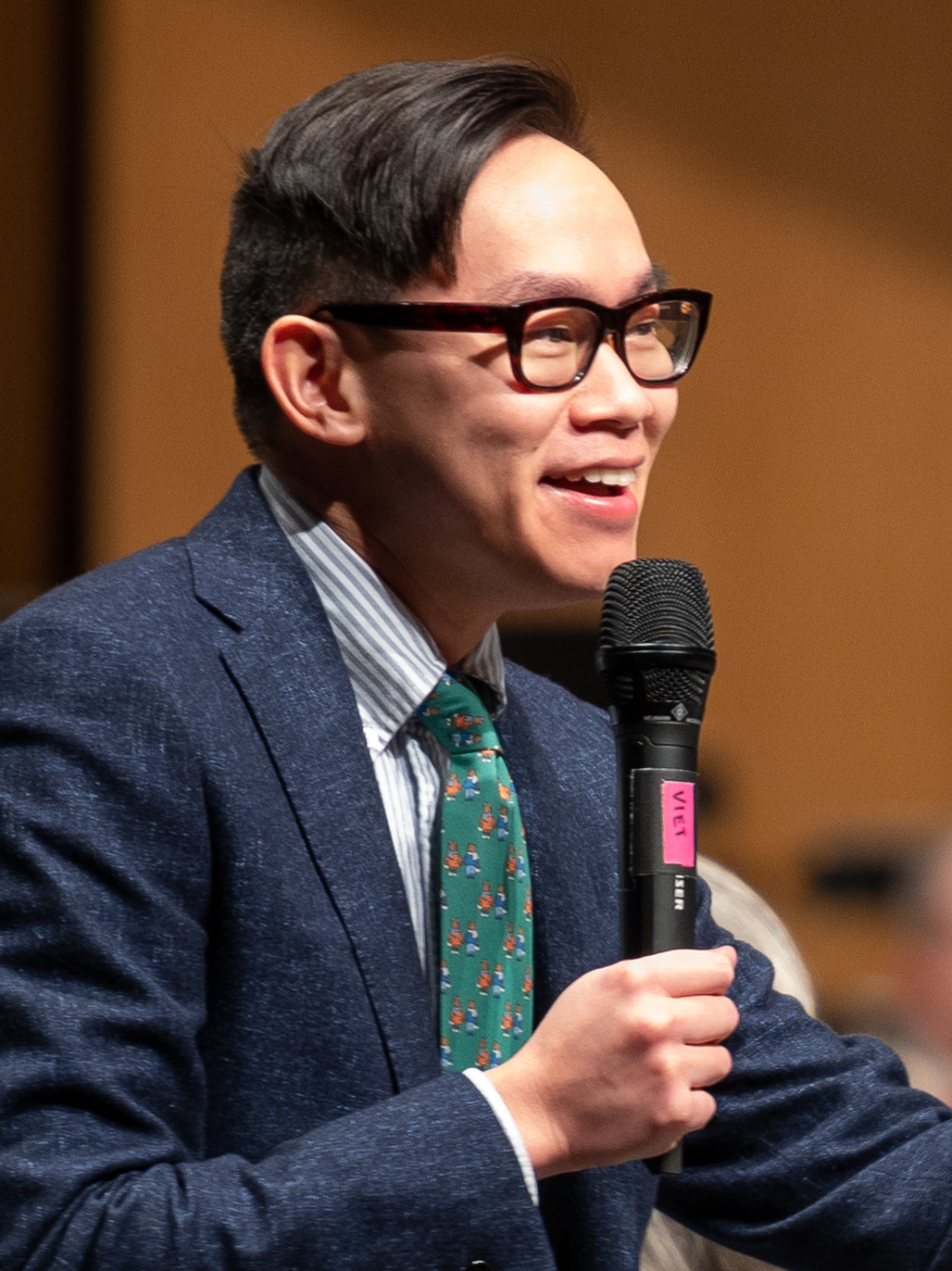
- Cuong in 2022

Background information
- Born: September 8, 1990 (age 35); West Hills, California, United States
- Genres: Contemporary classical
- Occupation: Composer
- Instruments: Percussion, clarinet, piano
- Years active: 2011–present
- Website: vietcuongmusic.com

Viet Cuong (born 1990 in West Hills, California) is a Vietnamese-American composer. Praised as "alluring" by The New York Times and "irresistible" by The San Francisco Chronicle, Cuong's music has been performed in venues such as Carnegie Hall, Lincoln Center, and the Kennedy Center. His music has been commissioned and performed by organizations such as the New York Philharmonic, So Percussion, Alarm Will Sound, Eighth Blackbird, Saint Paul Chamber Orchestra, Albany Symphony Orchestra, PRISM Saxophone Quartet, The Crossing, and Les Délices.

== Biography ==
The son of Vietnamese immigrants, Cuong was born in West Hills, California, and grew up in Marietta, Georgia, where he graduated from Lassiter High School. He credits his high school band program for helping him find both a love of music and sense of belonging. He studied music composition at the Peabody Institute, Princeton University, and Curtis Institute of Music. His mentors include Kevin Puts, Oscar Bettison, Donnacha Dennehy, Steven Mackey, Jennifer Higdon, David Ludwig, and Richard Danielpour.

Cuong serves on the music composition faculty at the University of Nevada, Las Vegas and was the Young American Composer-in-Residence of the California Symphony from August 2020 through July 2023.
