= Harp Concerto (Higdon) =

2018 composition by Jennifer Higdon

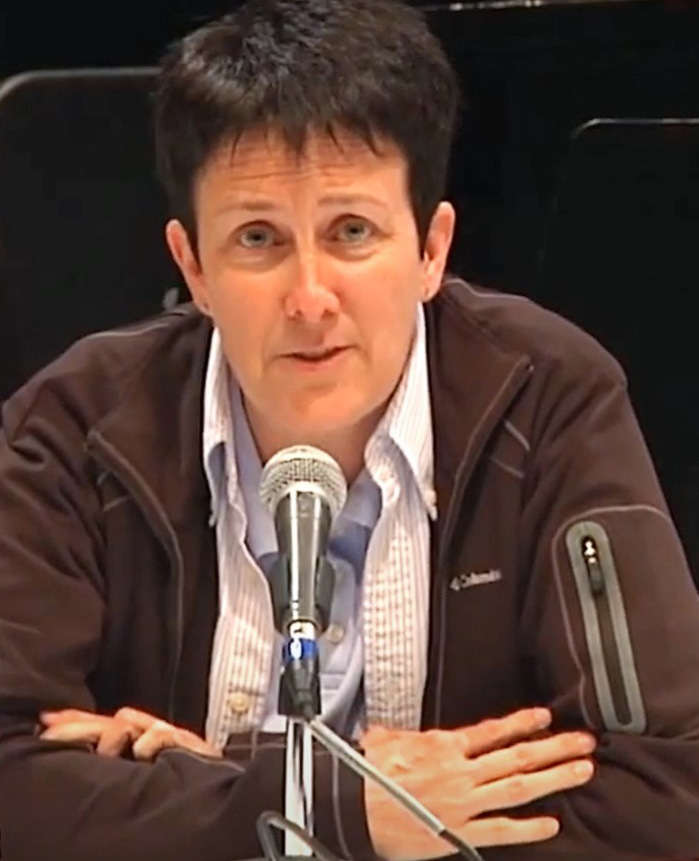
Jennifer Higdon in 2014

The Harp Concerto is a composition for harp and orchestra by the American composer Jennifer Higdon. It was commissioned by the Rochester Philharmonic Orchestra, Harrisburg Symphony Orchestra, Baton Rouge Symphony Orchestra, Fargo-Moorhead Symphony Orchestra, Lansing Symphony Orchestra, and the Oklahoma City Philharmonic. The work was completed in early 2018 and was given its world premiere at the Eastman Theatre in Rochester, New York, by the harpist Yolanda Kondonassis and the Rochester Philharmonic Orchestra under the conductor Ward Stare on May 10, 2018. The piece is dedicated to Yolanda Kondonassis.

== Composition ==
The concerto has a duration of approximately 20 minutes and is cast in four movements:

1. First Light
2. Joy Ride
3. Lullaby
4. Rap Knock

== Reception ==
Reviewing the world premiere, Daniel J. Kushner of City Newspaper praised the concerto, writing, "What started out as a somewhat muted affair quickly became a sweeping scape with symphonic tendencies. Higdon was keen to showcase the harp's naturally rich harmonic colors, and there was something prayerful about Kondonassis's playing, particularly in the quieter moments." Reviewing a recording of the work, Tal Agam of The Classic Review similarly described it as "an exciting and truly original new piece, that can certainly enjoy success with the public."

In 2020, Higdon won the Grammy Award for Best Contemporary Classical Composition for her composition of the piece. Kondonassis was nominated for her performance of the concerto with Ward Stare and the Rochester Philharmonic Orchestra, but did not win.

== Recording ==
The world premiere recording of the Harp Concerto was released on the album "American Rapture" through Azica Records on May 17, 2019.

== See also ==
- List of compositions by Jennifer Higdon
