= Violin Concerto (Higdon) =

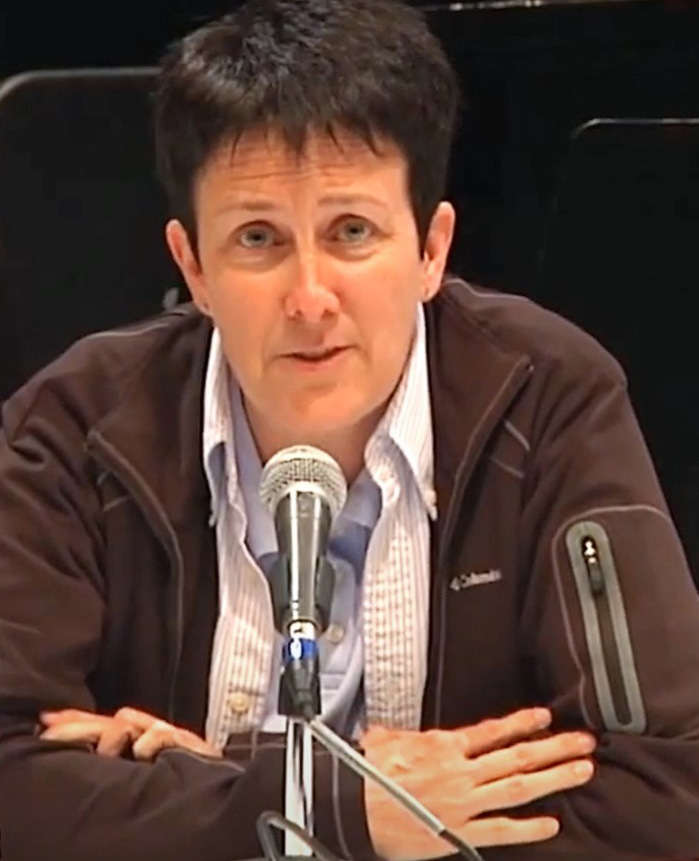
Jennifer Higdon in 2014

Jennifer Higdon's Concerto for Violin and Orchestra was written in 2008. The work was jointly commissioned by the Indianapolis Symphony Orchestra, the Toronto Symphony Orchestra, the Baltimore Symphony Orchestra, and the Curtis Institute of Music. It was composed for the violinist Hilary Hahn and was given its world premiere by Hahn and the Indianapolis Symphony Orchestra under the conductor Mario Venzago on February 6, 2009. The piece was later awarded the 2010 Pulitzer Prize for Music.

== Composition ==
=== Structure ===
The concerto has a duration of roughly 33 minutes and is composed in three movements:

1. "1726" – named after the address of the Curtis Institute of Music in Philadelphia, 1726 Locust Street, where Higdon is a professor. The movement features a lot of simultaneous sevenths, seconds, and sixths, allowing the violinist to showcase great manual dexterity
2. "Chaconni" – a lyrical movement, it allows the soloist to perform in duets and trios with various instruments
3. "Fly Forward" – a fast–paced movement, Higdon imagined violinist Hilary Hahn racing in the Olympics as she was composing the piece

=== Instrumentation ===
The work is scored for a solo violin and an orchestra comprising two flutes (2nd doubling piccolo), two oboes (2nd doubling English horn), two clarinets, two bassoons, four horns, three trumpets, three trombones, tuba, harp, timpani, two percussionists, and strings.

== Reception ==
The Violin Concerto has been praised by music critics. Reviewing the New York City premiere, Allan Kozinn of The New York Times wrote, "Its big, exploratory opening movement is packed with quick, insistent solo lines and dialogues between the violin and either the full orchestra or individual sections or players; its lush, slow movement (here in the form of a chaconne) exploits the violin's lyrical qualities, and its finale is driven by daredevil speediness." Duncan Druce of Gramophone similarly described the piece as "an attractive, colourful work, scored most imaginatively and with great finesse." He continued, "I enjoyed the first movement especially, its disparate material so expertly contrasted and integrated. The second movement, entitled 'Chaconni', has a pastoral feel, vaguely reminiscent of Vaughan Williams but with the lark ascending into a more unsettled sky. The finale, a real showpiece for the violin, is less substantial but rhythmically most inventive."

== See also ==
- List of compositions by Jennifer Higdon
