= Sandbox Percussion =

American percussion ensemble

- Origin: Brooklyn, New York
- Genres: Contemporary classical
- Years active: 2011–present
- Members: Jonathan Allen; Victor Caccese; Ian Rosenbaum; Terry Sweeney
- Website: sandboxpercussion.com

Sandbox Percussion is an American percussion quartet based in Brooklyn, New York, consisting of Jonathan Allen, Victor Caccese, Ian Rosenbaum, and Terry Sweeney. The group formed in 2011 after its members met in graduate school.

In 2021, the quartet premiered Seven Pillars, an 80-minute, 11-movement work for percussion quartet by composer Andy Akiho, commissioned by the ensemble following an eight-year collaboration. Writing in The New York Times, critic Zachary Woolfe described the piece as "a lush, brooding celebration of noise". In The Seattle Times, Thomas May wrote that the quartet's playing reflected "an incredibly disciplined collective musical intelligence". Their performance of Seven Pillars received the nomination for Best Chamber Music/Small Ensemble Performance at the 64th Annual Grammy Awards.
