= Derek Bermel =

- Born: 1967 (age 58–59); New York City, New York, U.S.
- Occupation: Composer

Derek Bermel (born 1967, in New York City) is an American composer, clarinetist and conductor whose music blends various facets of world music, funk and jazz with largely classical performing forces and musical vocabulary. He is the recipient of various awards including a Guggenheim Fellowship and the American Academy in Rome's Rome Prize awarded to artists for a year-long residency in Rome.

== Life ==
Bermel earned his B.A. at Yale University and later studied at the University of Michigan, Ann Arbor with William Bolcom and William Albright. He also studied with Louis Andriessen in Amsterdam and Henri Dutilleux at Tanglewood. Later, his interest in a wide range of musical cultures sent him to Jerusalem to study ethnomusicology with André Hajdu, Bulgaria to investigate Thracian folk style with Nikola Iliev, Brazil to learn caxixi with Julio Góes, and to Ghana to study Lobi xylophone with Ngmen Baaru.

Bermel's output includes pieces for a variety of performing forces, including solo vocal songs, pieces for large and small chamber ensembles, and fourteen orchestral works. Though the ensembles he writes for are largely classical, his voice as a composer has been heavily influenced by both his travels and his education in Western art and popular music. His orchestral work A shout, a whisper, and a trace is a good example of this interplay, as it draws on Bermel's knowledge of the Thracian folk style and the work of fellow ethnomusicologist and classical composer Béla Bartók. Moreover, the piece engages directly with the experience of living in an unfamiliar culture, drawing on Bartók's letters home from New York during the last five years of his life. He first came into the national spotlight with works like Natural Selection, a series of animal portraits for baritone and ensemble, and Voices, a concerto for clarinet and orchestra which he wrote for himself to perform. The piece was premiered by the American Composers Orchestra under the baton of the composer/conductor Tan Dun and has since been performed by many other ensembles and conductors, including the Los Angeles Philharmonic under the baton of composer/conductor John Adams. Other important works include his "Migration Series," a piece for jazz band and orchestra that draws on impressions of Jacob Lawrence's set of 60 paintings by the same name depicting the mass movement of African-Americans from the South to the North at the beginning of the 20th century, and "Soul Garden," a viola solo accompanied by string quintet that utilizes quarter-tones and slides to emulate the vocal effects of a gospel singer. "Soul Garden" in particular reflects what Richard Scheinen, jazz writer for the San Jose Mercury News, has called Bermel's preoccupation with "the human voice--or more generally, language and the yearning the communicate.". This artistic concern is equally evident in lighter pieces such as "Language Instruction," a humorous work for clarinet, viola, cello, and piano in which the clarinet plays the role of the voice on a language tape and the other three instruments students with various degrees of aptitude for the task at hand.

Bermel is also an accomplished clarinetist and plays both classical repertoire and rock and funk, performing with groups such as his own TONK. He also sings and plays keyboards and caxixi in the rock band Peace by Piece. He has premiered and performed numerous pieces with large orchestras, including his own concerto Voices and John Adams Gnarly Buttons with the composer at the podium.

Besides his work as a composer and performer, Bermel is active as a teacher. He founded and served as director of the New York Youth Symphony's Making Score workshop for young composers. The workshop meets twice a month at the ASCAP to study orchestration and composition. The group and has heard from guest lecturers such as Meredith Monk, Steve Reich, and John Corigliano and had pieces read by ensembles such as the American Composers Orchestra. More recently, he has mentored both young composers and conductors at Carnegie Hall through the Weill Music Institute. Bermel also conducts masterclasses at universities and music festivals such as the University of Michigan, University of Chicago, Yale University, Peabody Conservatory, Bowdoin, Tanglewood, and Aspen.

Bermel's music is published by Peer Music Classical in the United States and is distributed in Europe, Australia and New Zealand by Faber Music.

Bermel began a three-year residency with the American Composers Orchestra in Fall of 2006 and currently serves on the ACO board. In 2009 Bermel began his three-year tenure as composer-in-residence with the Los Angeles Chamber Orchestra as well as his position as artist-in-residence at the Institute for Advanced Study in Princeton, New Jersey, where he currently lives and works.

Bermel has collaborated with the novelist Sandra Cisneros to adapt her work The House on Mango Street, first in 2017 as an orchestral suite with monologues and choreography, and then as an opera with Cisneros as librettist. Mango Suite was commissioned for the Chautauqua Institution by Francis and Cindy Letro, in honor of Tom and Jane Becker, and had its world premier on July 22, 2017. The opera will have its official premier in July 2025 at the Glimmerglass Festival in upstate New York.

== Music ==
=== Chamber works ===
Large chamber ensemble:

- Canzonas Americanas (2010)
- Swing Song (2009)
- In Tangle (2005)
- Three Rivers (2001)
- Continental Divide (1996)
- Hot Zone (1995)

Small chamber ensemble:

- Intonations (2016), string quartet
- Passing Through (2007), string quartet
- Twin Trio (2005), flute, clarinet, and piano
- Tied Shifts (2004), flute, clarinet, violin, cello, piano, and percussion
- Language Instruction (2003), clarinet, violin, cello, and piano
- Catcalls (2003), brass quintet
- Soul Garden (2000), viola + 2 violins, viola, 2 cellos
- Coming Together (1999), clarinet and cello
- God's Trombones (1998), 3 trombones and percussion
- Oct Up (1995), double string quartet
- Wanderings (1994), flute, oboe, clarinet, horn, and bassoon
- SchiZm (1994), clarinet/oboe and piano
- String Quartet (1992), string quartet
- Mulatash Stomp (1991), violin, clarinet, and piano
- Sonata Humana (1991), clarinet and piano

=== Orchestral works ===
- Mango Suite (2017)
- A Shout, A Whisper, and a Trace (2009)
- Elixir (2006)
- Migration Series (2006)
- Slides (2003)
- Tag Rag (2003)
- The Ends (2002)
- Thracian Echoes (2002)
- Dust Dances (1994)

With a solo instrument or voice:

- Mar de Setembro (2011), mezzo-soprano and chamber orchestra
- Ritornello (2011), electric guitar concerto
- The Good Life (2008), soprano, baritone, choir, and orchestra
- Turning Variations (2006), piano concerto
- The Sting (2001-2) - (narr, orch)
- Voices (1997), clarinet concerto

=== Symphonic Band ===
- Ides March (2005)

=== Choral works ===
- A Child's War (2005)
- Kpanlongo (1993)
- Pete Pete (1993)

=== Songs ===
Solo voice:

- Nature Calls (1999), medium voice and piano
- Cabaret Songs (1998), soprano and piano
- See How She Moves (1997), solo medium voice
- Three Songs on Poems by Wendy S. Walters (1993), medium voice and piano

With ensemble:

- Cabaret Songs (2007), soprano, clarinet, percussion, double bass, dobro, and guitar
- Natural Selection (2000), low voice and ensemble
- At the End of the World (2000), high voice and orchestra
- Old Songs for a New Man (1997), baritone soloist and trumpet, trombone, piano, percussion, violin, double bass

=== Solo Instrument ===
- Fetch (2004), piano
- Funk Studies (2004), piano
- Kontraphunktus (2004), piano
- Thracian Sketches (2003), clarinet
- Meditation (1997), piano
- Turning (1995), piano
- Two Songs from Nandom (1993), organ
- Theme and Absurdities (1993), clarinet
- Dodecaphunk (1992), piano
- Three Funk Studies (1991), piano
