= Jennifer Higdon =

American composer (born 1962)

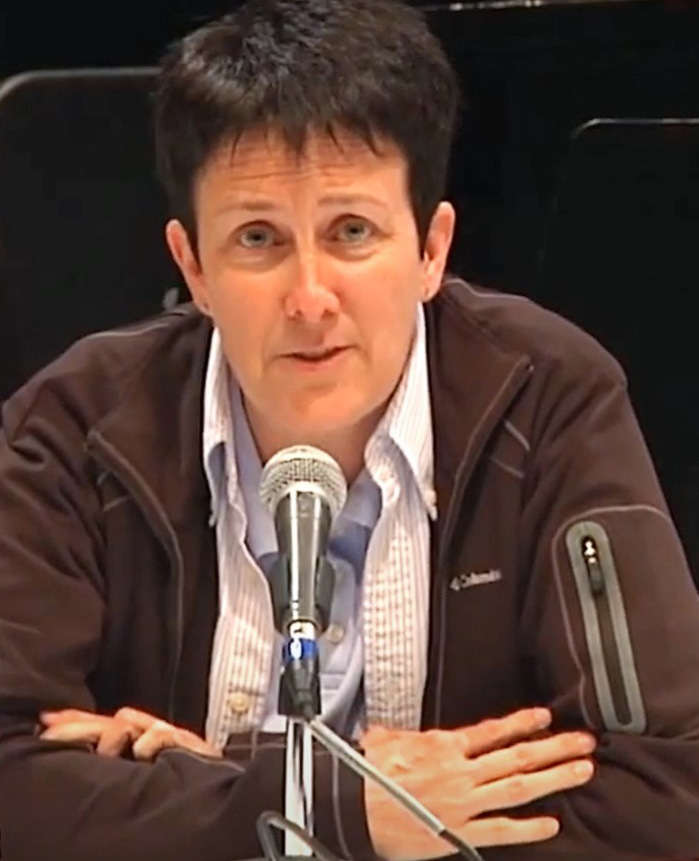
Higdon speaking at the 2014 Cabrillo Festival of Contemporary Music

Jennifer Elaine Higdon (born December 31, 1962) is an American composer of contemporary classical music. She has received many awards, including the 2010 Pulitzer Prize for Music for her Violin Concerto and three Grammy Awards for Best Contemporary Classical Composition for her Percussion Concerto in 2010, Viola Concerto in 2018, and Harp Concerto in 2020. Elected a Member of the American Philosophical Society in 2019, she was a professor of composition at the Curtis Institute of Music from 1994 to 2021.

== Biography ==
Higdon was born in Brooklyn, New York. She spent the first ten years of her life in Atlanta, Georgia before moving to Seymour, Tennessee. Her father, Charles Higdon, was a painter and made efforts to expose his children to different types of art. He took them to various exhibitions of new and experimental art that gave her her earliest exposure to art and helped her to form an idea of what art was. She also developed an interest in photography and writing at an early age. Despite her early introduction to art, she received very little exposure to classical music in her home. Instead, her early musical education came from listening to rock and folk music from the 1960s. It was not until high school that she joined a concert band, where she began playing percussion. At about the same time, she picked up a flute her mother had bought, and she began teaching herself to play using an old flute method book. She played flute in her high school's concert band and percussion in a marching band, but she heard little classical music before her college years.

She studied flute performance at Bowling Green State University with Judith Bentley, who encouraged her to explore composition. Because of her lack of formal training at an early age, Higdon struggled to catch up early in her college career. She said of beginning college, "I didn't know any basic theory, how to spell a chord, what intervals were, and I had zero keyboard skills. I basically started from the very, very beginning. Most of the people I started school with were far more advanced than I was, and I had an extraordinary amount of catching up to do." Despite these challenges, she established herself as a hard worker and a resilient student, even when she faced discouragement from some professors.

During her time at Bowling Green, she wrote her first composition, a two-minute piece for flute and piano titled Night Creatures. Of playing in the university orchestra, she said: "Because I came to classical music very differently than most people, the newer stuff had more appeal for me than the older." While at Bowling Green, she met Robert Spano, who was teaching a conducting course there and who became one of the champions of Higdon's music in the American orchestral community.

Higdon earned an artist's diploma from the Curtis Institute of Music, where she studied with David Loeb and taught the future virtuoso Hilary Hahn. She eventually obtained both a master of arts and a PhD in composition from the University of Pennsylvania under the tutelage of George Crumb.

From 1994 to 2021, Higdon was a professor of composition at the Curtis Institute of Music, where she held the Milton L. Rock Chair in Compositional Studies. She has served as composer-in-residence with the Pittsburgh Symphony Orchestra, the Green Bay Symphony Orchestra, the Philadelphia Orchestra, the Fort Worth Symphony and the Music Academy of the West.

Higdon and her partner, Cheryl Lawson, self-publish Higdon's work under the name Lawdon Press.

Higdon lives in Chapel Hill, North Carolina.

== Works and performances ==
Higdon has received commissions from major symphony orchestras, including the Philadelphia Orchestra, the Cleveland Orchestra, the Chicago Symphony, the Atlanta Symphony, the National Symphony, the Minnesota Orchestra, the Pittsburgh Symphony, the Indianapolis Symphony, and the Dallas Symphony. Conductors who worked extensively with her include Christoph Eschenbach, Marin Alsop, Leonard Slatkin, and Giancarlo Guerrero. She has written works for soloists including baritone Thomas Hampson, pianists Yuja Wang and Gary Graffman, violinists Nadja Salerno-Sonnenberg, Jennifer Koh and Hilary Hahn.

She wrote her first opera based on Charles Frazier's 1997 novel, Cold Mountain with a libretto by Gene Scheer. It was co-commissioned by The Santa Fe Opera and Opera Philadelphia and premiered in Santa Fe in 2015.

Her works have been recorded on more than four dozen CDs. Her most popular work is blue cathedral, a one-movement tone poem which she wrote in memory of her brother, who died of cancer in 1998. Premiered in 2000, it has since been performed by more than 400 orchestras around the world.

=== Selected discography ===
- Cold Mountain (world premiere). Miguel Harth-Bedoya, Nathan Gunn, Isabel Leonard, Jay Hunter Morris, Emily Fons, Robert Pomakov, The Santa Fe Opera. PENTATONE PTC 5186583 (2016)

== Compositional style and influence ==
Jennifer Higdon's musical background has influenced her in many unique ways. Her style grew out of her musical upbringing, which was characterized by much greater and earlier exposure to popular music such as the Beatles, the Rolling Stones, Simon & Garfunkel, and many other groups, rather than to classical music. As a result, she has described her own compositional process as "intuitive" and "instinctive," where she favors music that makes sense, rather than writing music that adheres to classical forms and structures. Popular and folk music were not the only early influences on her composition; the mountains and wide open spaces of her Tennessee home have influenced her style, and even helped bond her to George Crumb, who encouraged her to use nature as a muse.

Many of Jennifer Higdon's pieces are considered neoromantic. Harmonically, Higdon's music tends to use tonal structures, but eschews traditional harmonic progressions in favor of more open intervals. Avoiding specific key signatures allows for sudden, surprising harmonic shifts and modulations. Open perfect fifths and parallel fifths can be found in most of her compositions. She also often uses scalar passages to add melodic or harmonic context to the music. Her early background in percussion likely influenced her rhythmic style; her music often features complex, intricate rhythmic passages, even when melodies are lyrical. She also makes use of rhythmic ostinati which give motion to many of her works – especially her more rapid compositions. Some of her rhythmic and melodic repetition could be considered minimalist in nature.

In her vocal and choral works, Higdon works to emulate speech patterns and applies them to writing both the pitch and the rhythm of her melodies. She tries to reflect the mood of the text, which results in melodies that tend to have a more romantic sound. On the occasions where she has set non-English texts, she tends to use both the text and translation in the piece, allowing the piece to more effectively communicate its message.

Structurally, her music reflects the "intuitive" style that she composes by: Her music is decidedly sectional, but tends to have a natural flow – melodies often carry over bar lines, creating some motivic and sectional ambiguity. Many of her works begin with a sparse orchestration, and build in performing forces as a piece continues, creating variety and interest throughout a given piece of music. Higdon does not intentionally compose with a form in mind, but allows the music to unfold naturally.

== Reception ==
The League of American Orchestras reported Higdon as one of the most performed living American composers, in 2008. "Higdon's music is lithe and expert," wrote Robert Battey of the Washington Post. "Jennifer Higdon's vivid, attractive works have made her a hot commodity lately," wrote Steve Smith of the New York Times.

Among less favorable assessments, Rowena Smith of The Guardian said one of Higdon's most popular compositions, blue cathedral, "is pure new-age fluff; undemanding, unadventurous tonality dressed up as a quasi-mystical experience by the addition of bells and chimes." Andrew Clements in the Guardian gave a recording of Higdon's Concerto for Orchestra a minimal one-star rating. He referred to the music as "American contemporary music at its most vacuous, a noisy mishmash." Tom Service, also in the Guardian also criticized Concerto For Orchestra, writing, "The problem with Higdon's piece ... is that its flamboyant gestures ... function only as surface effects, without creating any real structural momentum." In a more positive review, Raymond Tuttle wrote that "even though the Concerto for Orchestra is not remarkable for its melodic content, there is so much color and brilliance in Higdon's writing ... that few listeners will notice."

=== Awards ===
Higdon received awards from the Guggenheim Foundation, the American Academy of Arts & Letters (two awards), the Pew Fellowship in the Arts, Meet-the-Composer, the National Endowment for the Arts, and ASCAP. In addition she has received grants from the Pennsylvania Council on the Arts. Higdon has been a featured composer at festivals including Grand Teton, Tanglewood, Vail, Norfolk, Winnipeg and Cabrillo.

She has won the Grammy Award for Best Contemporary Classical Composition three times. The first was in 2010 for her Percussion Concerto. The second was in 2018 for her Viola Concerto. That concerto was part of an album dedicated to her music on the Naxos label, Higdon: All Things Majestic, Viola Concerto, and Oboe Concerto, which also won the 2018 Grammy for Best Classical Compendium. The third was in 2020 for her Harp Concerto.

Higdon won the annual Pulitzer Prize for Music for her Violin Concerto (Lawdon Press), which premiered February 6, 2009, in Indianapolis. The Pulitzer citation called it "a deeply engaging piece that combines flowing lyricism with dazzling virtuosity". It was commissioned jointly by the Indianapolis Symphony, Toronto Symphony, Baltimore Symphony and the Curtis Institute of Music.
