= Cabrillo Festival of Contemporary Music =

American festival

- Genre: Orchestra, new music
- Dates: late July–August
- Locations: Santa Cruz, California, USA
- Years active: Annual since 1963
- Founders: Lou Harrison
- Organiser: Cristian Măcelaru (Music Director)
- Website: www.cabrillomusic.org

The Cabrillo Festival of Contemporary Music is an annual Festival dedicated to contemporary symphonic music by living composers. The music director since 2017 has been Cristian Măcelaru. According to Jesse Rosen, CEO of the League of American Orchestras, the Festival is "distinctive for being focused entirely on contemporary works." Each year, a tenured orchestra gathers in Santa Cruz, California to rehearse five programs of contemporary music, often world, US, or West Coast premieres. Most of the composers whose work is performed each season come to the Festival to be in residence and participate in the rehearsals and performances of their work, as well as to participate in public panel discussions, lectures, and concert introductions. The Festival also presents guest artists and ensembles known for contemporary music performance, such as Kronos Quartet or eighth blackbird.

== History ==
The Festival was founded in 1963 by the composers Lou Harrison, Robert Hughes and collaborators from the Santa Cruz-area music community, on the campus of the newly opened Cabrillo College just outside Santa Cruz in Aptos, California. The first music director was Gerhard Samuel. The Festival quickly grew to prominence, thanks in part to Harrison's stature and the participation of well-known composers such as John Cage and Aaron Copland. Subsequent music directors included Mexican composer Carlos Chávez, conductor Dennis Russell Davies, and American composer John Adams. By the late 1970s, the Festival had established itself as an independent organization unaffiliated with Cabrillo College. After the devastating Loma Prieta earthquake caused major damage around Santa Cruz in 1989, the Festival established itself in downtown Santa Cruz, and the majority of the Festival's performances since 1989 have taken place at Santa Cruz Civic Auditorium or at Mission San Juan Bautista in San Juan Bautista, California.

In 1992, Marin Alsop was chosen as the Festival's new music director. Alsop rose to significant fame in the 2000s after being the first conductor awarded a MacArthur Genius Grant in 2005 and the first woman named to direct a major American orchestra, the Baltimore Symphony Orchestra, in 2007. In 1992, she was a young up-and-coming musician. She decided to more exclusively focus the Festival on the work of living composers. Since her tenure began, the Festival has promoted the careers of a number of prominent composers, performing their work and offering substantial commissions. Notable examples include Christopher Rouse, Jennifer Higdon, Kevin Puts, and Michael Daugherty. The Festival also frequently features the music of Philip Glass, John Adams, James MacMillan, and Osvaldo Golijov, among others.

In September 2016, the Festival announced that Cristian Măcelaru would succeed Alsop as music director, beginning in summer 2017. The 2021 program included the world premier of "Contested Eden" by Gabriela Lena Frank, with recorded choreography filmed on locations of the nearby CZU Lightning Complex fires.

The Cabrillo Festival Orchestra consists of professional musicians from around the world who travel to Santa Cruz annually for the two-week run of the festival. There is no formal audition process for the orchestra; new players are recruited by the music director in consultation with principal players, and undergo a three-season trial process before being granted tenure in their positions. The current concertmaster of the Festival Orchestra is Justin Bruns. Other current principal players include Adam Sadberry (flute); Lillian Copeland (oboe); Bharat Chandra (clarinet); Hunter Gordon (bassoon); Federico Montes (trumpet); David Murray (trombone); Justin Benavidez (tuba); Galen Lemmon (percussion); Julie Smith Phillips (harp); Emily Wong (keyboard); Matt Albert (2nd violin); Sam Bergman (viola); Úna O'Riordan (cello); and Ryan Baird (bass).

== Activities ==
In 2012, the Festival celebrated its 50th anniversary with a series of commissioned world premieres by such composers as Laura Karpman and James MacMillan. This followed celebrations of Marin Alsop's 20th anniversary as music director in 2011, which also included a number of substantial commissions by John Corigliano, Mark Adamo, Philip Glass, and others. The Festival has a commissioning series for young composers identified in collaboration with John Adams that has included new works by Zosha Di Castri, Dylan Mattingly, and Sean Friar. The Festival also runs a "Conductors/Composers Workshop" in collaboration with the Conductors Guild in which young conductors study with Marin Alsop while emerging composers study with a faculty member chosen from among the season's composers-in-residence. Alumni of this program include Aleksandra Vrebalov and Missy Mazzoli.

The Festival also produces a large street fair, the "Church Street Fair," held over two days during the first weekend of August. The Fair spotlights performances and art work by artists local to Santa Cruz County. The fair was cancelled in 2020 and 2021 due to COVID-19. After cancelling the entire festival in 2020, virtual works were performed in 2021.

Because of its unusual focus on contemporary work, the New York Times has called the Festival a "mecca for new-music lovers."
