= List of symphony orchestras in the United States =

There were 1,224 symphony orchestras in the United States as of 2014. Some U.S. orchestras maintain a full 52-week performing season, but most are small and have shorter seasons. As of 2007, there were 117 U.S. orchestras with annual budgets of $2.5 million or more.

Critics in the 1950s identified five American orchestras as the Big Five, those considered leaders in "musical excellence, calibre of musicianship, total contract weeks, weekly basic wages, recording guarantees, and paid vacations." The five were the New York Philharmonic, Boston Symphony Orchestra, Chicago Symphony Orchestra, Philadelphia Orchestra, and Cleveland Orchestra. But the concept and the list are now outmoded. Music critics today include more orchestras on their lists of "top" American orchestras.

Notable U.S. orchestras are listed here by state. Youth orchestras are listed in a separate list of youth orchestras in the United States. For orchestras in other countries, see list of symphony orchestras.

== Alabama ==
- Alabama Symphony Orchestra (Birmingham)
- Huntsville Symphony Orchestra
- Mobile Symphony Orchestra
- Montgomery Symphony Orchestra
- Tuscaloosa Symphony Orchestra

== Alaska ==
- Anchorage Symphony Orchestra
- Juneau Symphony

== Arizona ==
- Flagstaff Symphony Orchestra
- Phoenix Symphony
- Tucson Symphony Orchestra

== Arkansas ==
- Arkansas Symphony Orchestra
- Symphony of Northwest Arkansas
- Texarkana Symphony Orchestra

== California ==
- Bakersfield Symphony Orchestra
- California Symphony
- California Philharmonic Orchestra
- Fremont Symphony Orchestra
- Golden State Pops Orchestra
- Hollywood Bowl Orchestra
- Hollywood Chamber Orchestra
- Hollywood Studio Symphony
- Hollywood Symphony Orchestra
- Long Beach Symphony Orchestra
- Los Angeles Chamber Orchestra
- Los Angeles Philharmonic
- Modesto Symphony Orchestra
- New Century Chamber Orchestra
- New West Symphony
- North State Symphony
- Oakland East Bay Symphony
- Pacific Symphony
- Pasadena Symphony
- Peninsula Symphony
- Redwood Symphony
- Sacramento Philharmonic Orchestra
- San Bernardino Symphony
- San Diego Symphony
- San Francisco Chamber Orchestra
- San Francisco Symphony
- Santa Barbara Symphony Orchestra
- Santa Cruz County Symphony
- Southeast Symphony
- Stockton Symphony
- Symphony San Jose
- Valley Symphony Orchestra (LAVC)

== Colorado ==
- Aspen Chamber Symphony
- Aurora Symphony Orchestra
- Colorado Springs Philharmonic
- Colorado Symphony
- Boulder Philharmonic Orchestra

== Connecticut ==
- Hartford Symphony Orchestra
- New Haven Symphony Orchestra
- Yale Symphony Orchestra

== Delaware ==
- Delaware Symphony Orchestra

== District of Columbia ==
- Kennedy Center Opera House Orchestra
- National Symphony Orchestra

== Florida ==
- Florida Orchestra
- Jacksonville Symphony
- New World Symphony Orchestra (Miami)
- Ocala Symphony Orchestra (formerly Central Florida Symphony Orchestra)
- Orlando Philharmonic Orchestra
- Orlando Pops Orchestra
- Sarasota Orchestra (formerly Florida West Coast Symphony)
- Tallahassee Symphony Orchestra

== Georgia ==
- Athens Symphony Orchestra
- Atlanta Pops Symphony Orchestra
- Atlanta Symphony Orchestra
- Augusta Symphony Orchestra
- New Trinity Baroque
- Rome Symphony Orchestra

== Hawaii ==
- Hawaii Symphony Orchestra

== Illinois ==
- Belleville Philharmonic Society
- Champaign Urbana Symphony Orchestra
- Chicago Sinfonietta
- Chicago Symphony Orchestra
- Civic Orchestra of Chicago
- Elgin Symphony Orchestra
- Grant Park Symphony Orchestra
- Illinois Philharmonic Orchestra
- Lyric Opera of Chicago
- Music of the Baroque
- Peoria Symphony Orchestra
- Quad City Symphony Orchestra
- Rockford Symphony Orchestra
- Urbana Pops Orchestra

== Indiana ==
- Carmel Symphony Orchestra
- Evansville Philharmonic Orchestra
- Fort Wayne Philharmonic Orchestra
- Indianapolis Symphony Orchestra
- Northwest Indiana Symphony Orchestra

== Iowa ==
- Des Moines Symphony
- Dubuque Symphony Orchestra
- Orchestra Iowa, Cedar Rapids
- Quad City Symphony Orchestra
- Sioux City Symphony Orchestra

== Kansas ==
- Kansas City Symphony
- Wichita Symphony Orchestra

== Kentucky ==
- Lexington Philharmonic Orchestra
- Louisville Orchestra

== Louisiana ==
- Baton Rouge Symphony Orchestra
- Lake Charles Symphony
- Louisiana Philharmonic Orchestra (New Orleans)
- Monroe Symphony Orchestra
- Shreveport Symphony Orchestra

== Maine ==
- Augusta Symphony Orchestra
- Bangor Symphony Orchestra
- Portland Symphony Orchestra

== Maryland ==
- Annapolis Symphony Orchestra
- Baltimore Symphony Orchestra
- Baltimore Chamber Orchestra
- Baltimore Philharmonia
- Concert Artists of Baltimore
- Maryland Symphony Orchestra
- National Philharmonic at Strathmore
- Soulful Symphony
- Susquehanna Symphony Orchestra
- Symphony Number One

== Massachusetts ==
- Boston Baroque
- Boston Civic Symphony
- Boston Classical Orchestra
- Boston Modern Orchestra Project
- Boston Philharmonic Orchestra
- Boston Pops Orchestra
- Boston Symphony Orchestra
- Boston Youth Symphony Orchestra
- Brockton Symphony Orchestra
- Cape Cod Symphony Orchestra
- Handel and Haydn Society
- Harvard Radcliffe Orchestra
- Lexington Symphony
- Longwood Symphony Orchestra
- Melrose Symphony Orchestra
- New England Philharmonic
- New Philharmonia Orchestra of Massachusetts
- North Shore Philharmonic Orchestra
- Pro Arte Chamber Orchestra of Boston
- Springfield Symphony Orchestra
- Waltham Symphony Orchestra
- Wellesley Symphony Orchestra

== Michigan ==
- Ann Arbor Symphony Orchestra
- Detroit Symphony Orchestra
- Grand Rapids Symphony
- Jackson Symphony Orchestra
- Kalamazoo Symphony Orchestra
- Lansing Symphony Orchestra
- Michigan Philharmonic
- Traverse Symphony Orchestra
- West Shore Symphony Orchestra

== Minnesota ==
- Bloomington Symphony Orchestra
- Duluth Superior Symphony Orchestra
- Fargo-Moorhead Symphony Orchestra
- Minnesota Orchestra
- Minnesota Philharmonic Orchestra
- Saint Paul Chamber Orchestra

== Mississippi ==
- Mississippi Symphony Orchestra (Jackson)
- North Mississippi Symphony Orchestra (Tupelo)
- Southern Mississippi Symphony Orchestra (Hattiesburg)

== Missouri ==
- Kansas City Symphony
- Missouri Symphony
- Ozark Festival Orchestra
- Saint Louis Symphony Orchestra

== Montana ==
- Billings Symphony Orchestra
- Helena Symphony Orchestra

== Nebraska ==
- Omaha Symphony Orchestra
- Kearney Symphony Orchestra

== Nevada ==
- Las Vegas Philharmonic Orchestra
- Reno Philharmonic Orchestra

== New Hampshire ==
- New Hampshire Philharmonic Orchestra

== New Jersey ==
- New Jersey Symphony
- Princeton Symphony Orchestra
- Symphony in C

== New Mexico ==
- Santa Fe Symphony Orchestra and Chorus

== New York ==
- Albany Symphony Orchestra
- American Classical Orchestra
- American Composers Orchestra
- American Symphony Orchestra
- Astoria Symphony
- Binghamton Philharmonic
- Brooklyn Symphony Orchestra
- Buffalo Philharmonic Orchestra
- Cayuga Chamber Orchestra, Ithaca
- Chamber Orchestra of New York
- Chautauqua Symphony Orchestra
- The Little Orchestra Society
- Long Island Philharmonic
- NBC Symphony Orchestra
- New York Philharmonic
- New York Pops
- New York Symphony Orchestra
- Orchestra of St. Luke's
- Orpheus Chamber Orchestra
- Rochester Philharmonic Orchestra
- The Syracuse Orchestra
- Westchester Philharmonic

== North Carolina ==
- Asheville Symphony Orchestra
- North Carolina Symphony
- Charlotte Symphony Orchestra

== North Dakota ==
- Fargo-Moorhead Symphony Orchestra
- Greater Grand Forks Symphony Orchestra
- Minot Symphony Orchestra

== Ohio ==
- Akron Symphony Orchestra
- Canton Symphony Orchestra
- Cincinnati Symphony Orchestra
- Cincinnati Pops Orchestra
- Cleveland Orchestra
- Cleveland Pops Orchestra
- Columbus Symphony Orchestra
- Dayton Philharmonic Orchestra
- Toledo Symphony Orchestra
- Youngstown Symphony Orchestra

== Oklahoma ==
- Oklahoma City Philharmonic
- Tulsa Symphony Orchestra

== Oregon ==
- Eugene Symphony
- Columbia Gorge Sinfonietta
- Hillsboro Symphony Orchestra
- Oregon East Symphony
- Oregon Mozart Players
- Oregon Symphony
- Portland Chamber Orchestra
- Portland Columbia Symphony
- Portland Youth Philharmonic

== Pennsylvania ==
- Allentown Symphony Orchestra
- Chamber Orchestra of Philadelphia
- Erie Philharmonic
- Harrisburg Symphony Orchestra
- Johnstown Symphony Orchestra
- Lancaster Symphony Orchestra
- Lansdowne Symphony Orchestra
- Old York Road Symphony
- Orchestra 2001
- Philadelphia Orchestra
- Philadelphia Virtuosi Chamber Orchestra
- Philly Pops
- Pittsburgh Symphony Orchestra

== Puerto Rico ==
- Puerto Rico Symphony Orchestra

== Rhode Island ==
- Rhode Island Philharmonic Orchestra

== South Carolina ==
- Beaufort Symphony Orchestra
- Charleston Symphony Orchestra
- Greenville Symphony Orchestra
- Lake Murray Symphony Orchestra
- South Carolina Philharmonic
- Long Bay Symphony Orchestra

== South Dakota ==
- Black Hills Symphony Orchestra, Rapid City
- South Dakota Symphony Orchestra, Sioux Falls

== Tennessee ==
- Chattanooga Symphony and Opera
- Jackson Symphony Orchestra
- Knoxville Symphony Orchestra
- Memphis Symphony Orchestra
- Nashville Symphony Orchestra
- Oak Ridge Symphony Orchestra

== Texas ==
- Austin Symphony Orchestra
- Dallas Symphony Orchestra
- Dallas Chamber Symphony
- Fort Worth Symphony Orchestra
- Houston Symphony
- Lubbock Symphony Orchestra
- River Oaks Chamber Orchestra
- San Antonio Symphony
- Symphony of Southeast Texas
- University of North Texas Symphony Orchestra
- Valley Symphony Orchestra
- West Texas Symphony

== Utah ==
- American West Symphony of Sandy
- Orchestra at Temple Square
- Salt Lake Symphony
- Utah Symphony
- Utah Valley Symphony

== Vermont ==
- Vermont Symphony Orchestra

== Virginia ==
- Fairfax Symphony Orchestra
- Richmond Symphony Orchestra
- Virginia Symphony Orchestra
- Roanoke Symphony Orchestra

== Washington ==
- Northwest Sinfonia
- Northwest Symphony Orchestra
- Seattle Philharmonic Orchestra
- Seattle Symphony Orchestra
- Spokane Symphony
- Walla Walla Symphony

== West Virginia ==
- West Virginia Symphony Orchestra
- Wheeling Symphony

== Wisconsin ==
- Beloit-Janesville Symphony Orchestra
- Central Wisconsin Symphony Orchestra
- Chippewa Valley Symphony
- Madison Symphony Orchestra
- Milwaukee Symphony Orchestra
- Wisconsin Chamber Orchestra

== See also ==
- League of American Orchestras
- Pops orchestra
