= Jackson Symphony Orchestra =

Jackson Symphony Orchestra may refer to:

- Jackson Symphony Orchestra (Michigan) in Jackson, Michigan
- Jackson Symphony Orchestra (Tennessee) in Jackson, Tennessee
- Mississippi Symphony Orchestra in Jackson, Mississippi (formerly named Jackson Symphony Orchestra)
