= Berenika Zakrzewski =

Berenika Schmitz, stage name Berenika, (born January 24, 1983) is a Canadian concert pianist.

== Education ==
A child prodigy, she performed as a pinao soloist with the Sault Symphony Orchestra at the age of 9.

She attended Professional Children's School in New York as well as the Juilliard School of Music. After high school she went to Harvard University on the Leonard Bernstein Scholarship, graduating magna cum laude in both music and government. She received her master's degree at Christ Church, Oxford University and her post-graduate diploma at the Royal Academy of Music in London.

== Career ==
She toured South America as a soloist with the Youth Orchestra of the Americas, performing in Brazil, Panama, Peru, Uruguay, Costa Rica, and Argentina, including at the Teatro Colón in Buenos Aires. She also played with the Oxford Philomusica.

She has performed internationally with orchestras such as the Pittsburgh Symphony, Asheville Symphony, with the Toronto Symphony Orchestra under Jukka Pekka Saraste, the National Arts Centre Orchestra of Canada under Erich Kunzel, the Penderecki Festival Orchestra under Heinrich Schiff, the Boston Civic Symphony under Max Hobart in Jordan Hall, the Winnipeg Symphony Orchestra, the Santa Rosa Symphony, the RIC Symphony Orchestra, the New Philharmonic Orchestra, Florida, and the Bialystock Philharmonic.

She has also performed with the Sinfonia Varsovia, Camerata New York, the Poznan Philharmonic, the Canadian Chamber Orchestra, the Christ Church Orchestra, the Beethoven Academy Orchestra and the Aspen Sinfonia.

She has also performed in the Allen Room, Jazz at Lincoln Center and at the Wigmore Hall, London. She was the spokesperson for CASIO's Privia, and was the Leonard Bernstein Fellow at the Tanglewood Music Center. She was presented to Queen Elizabeth II.

Berenika made a critically acclaimed live recording of the Beethoven Piano Concerto No. 3 with Sinfonietta Cracovia under John Axelrod, distributed by Universal Music Group. Her radio appearances include WQXR and Classic FM, MDR Germany, the BBC, NPR and the CBC.
