= JSO =

JSO may refer to:

- Cherokee County Airport (Texas)
- Jackson Symphony Orchestra (Michigan), in Jackson, Michigan
- Jackson Symphony Orchestra (Tennessee), in Jackson, Tennessee
- Jacksonville Sheriff's Office, in Jacksonville, Florida
- Jacksonville Symphony Orchestra, in Jacksonville, Florida
- Jerusalem Symphony Orchestra, In Israel
- Johnstown Symphony Orchestra, in Johnstown, Pennsylvania
- Special Operations Unit (Serbia) (Serbian: Jedinica za specijalne operacije), an elite special forces police unit
- Joint Staff Office
- Just Stop Oil, an environmental activist group in United Kingdom
