= Arianna Zukerman =

American lyric soprano (born 1972)

Arianna Zukerman (born 1972) is an American lyric soprano who has performed with some of the world's finest orchestras and opera companies. Her voice was described in The Washington Post as "remarkable" combining the "range, warmth and facility of a Rossini mezzo with shimmering, round high notes and exquisite pianissimos."

== Early life and education ==
Zukerman was born on December 7, 1972. Her father Pinchas Zukerman is a noted violinist and conductor and her mother Eugenia Zukerman is a flautist, writer, and correspondent for the arts on the television program, CBS Sunday Morning. Zukerman has one younger sibling, Natalia Zukerman, who is a noted singer and songwriter.

Zukerman initially studied theatre at Brown University but then transferred to the Juilliard School where she earned a Bachelor of Music in vocal studies. During this time, Zukerman also studied at the Chautauqua Institution's summer opera training program from 1993 to 1997. While in this program she performed the roles of Ginerva in Handel's Ariodante in 1996 and the title role in Handel's Alcina in 1997 under the direction of Chas Rader-Schieber.

In 1997, Zukerman made her professional opera debut with the Berkshire Opera Company as Barbarina in Mozart's Le nozze di Figaro. She returned to Berkshire the following year to perform and record the role of Anna Gomez in Gian Carlo Menotti's The Consul. This was the first complete recording made of that opera. In the Spring of 1999, she made her debut with Opera Illinois as Susanna in Mozart's Le nozze di Figaro.

In March 1999 Zukerman entered the Bavarian State Opera's Young Artist program where she stayed for one year. While in Munich, she performed the roles of Prinzessin Nicoletta in Prokofiev's Die Liebe zu den drei Orangen, Die Schleppträgerin in Richard Strauss' Elektra, Barbarina in Mozart's Le nozze di Figaro and Taumännchen in Humperdinck's Hänsel und Gretel among others. She also covered for several roles including the parts of Marzelline in Beethoven's Fidelio and Ginevra in Handel's Ariodante. Also during this time Zukerman returned to the United States in 2000 to perform the role of Wilma in the world premiere of Jean-Michel Damase's opera Ochelata's Wedding at the OK Mozart Festival, Nanetta in Verdi's Falstaff with Opera Illinois, and Zerlina in Mozart's Don Giovanni with the Berkshire Opera Company.

== Career ==
After leaving the Bavarian State Opera in March 2000, Zukerman returned to the United States and began performing lead opera roles in regional houses across the United States as well as occasionale performances in Europe, including several recitals in Spain with pianists Brian Zeger and Mikael Eliasen.

In the 2001–2002 season, she performed the role of Barbarina in Mozart's Le nozze di Figaro with the Gulbenkian Foundation in Lisbon under the baton of Lawrence Foster. She also sang the world premiere of Libby Larsen's Notes Slipped Under the Door and made her debut with the Israel Philharmonic Orchestra under conductor Ivor Bolton with whom she sang the soprano solo in Mozart's C Minor Mass and the roles of Solomon's Queen and the First Harlot in Handel's Solomon.

In the 2002–2003 season, Zukerman sang the role of Pamina in Mozart's The Magic Flute with Chattanooga Opera, the role of the Governess in Britten's The Turn of the Screw with Chicago Opera Theater, and created the role of Nizza in the world premiere of Donizetti's long-lost opera Elisabeth at the Caramoor Music Festival.

Also in 2002, Zukerman won the Willam Matheus Sullivan Foundation Singer Award which considerably raised her profile as an opera singer and helped Zukerman gain the attention of major opera houses and orchestras.

In the 2003–2004 season, Zukerman gave performances with the Minnesota Orchestra and at the Vail Valley Music Festival. She also sang with the Eos Orchestra in orchestrated and staged Schubert songs (staged by Peter Kazaras), made her debut with the Colorado Symphony singing Handel's Messiah with Marin Alsop, and sang Verdi's Requiem with the UC Davis Symphony and the Cathedral Choral Society in Washington, D.C.

In the 2004–2005 season, Zukerman made her debut with Arizona Opera in the role of Despina in Mozart's Così fan tutte, her debut with Cedar Rapids Opera as Susanna in Mozart's Le nozze di Figaro, and sang the role of Micaela in Bizet's Carmen with the Dallas Symphony Orchestra. She performed with the American Bach Soloists as the soprano soloist in their production of Handel's Messiah, the Rochester Philharmonic in Mahler's Symphony No. 4 , the UC Davis Symphony in Mahler's Symphony No. 2, the University Musical Society in Haydn's Creation, and performances with Red, the Vermeer Quartet, and the Pro Musica Chamber Orchestra. She also sang at the Savannah Music Festival and a gave a concert of Bach arias in New York.

During the 2005–2006 season, Zukerman made her debut with the New York City Opera in the roles of Tisiphone, Charito, and Aphrodite in Mark Adamo's Lysistrata and returned to Chattanooga Opera to perform the role of Euridice in Gluck's Orfeo ed Euridice. She also sang Mozart's Exultate, jubilate with the Pittsburgh Symphony Orchestra and Jackson Symphony Orchestra, and sang Haydn's Creation with the Chattanooga Symphony Orchestra. She also appeared as a soloist in the holiday concerts presented at the Kennedy Center by The Choral Arts Society of Washington.

In the 2006–2007 season, Zukerman made her debut with the Boston Symphony Orchestra under James Levine in Schoenberg's Moses und Aron, sang under her father's baton in the National Arts Centre Orchestra's production of Verdi's Requiem, and performed in two productions of the Messiah with the Rochester Philharmonic and the Virginia symphony. Zukerman also performed the role of Susanna in Mozart's Le nozze di Figaro with the National Philharmonic, appeared as a soloist at the Kennedy Center's New Year's Eve Gala, gave a concert of Mozart arias at the University of California at Davis, and performed as a soloist in Dvořák's Stabat Mater with the Chancel Choir in Dallas. Zukerman also toured the United States with the Miami String Quartet and made her first collaboration with Lorin Maazel as Female Chorus in The Rape of Lucretia in performances at the conductor's farm in Virginia.

In the summer of 2007, Zukerman made her debut with the Philadelphia Orchestra as soloist in Beethoven's Symphony No. 9. The performances took place at the Mann Center in Philadelphia, at the Bravo! Vail Valley Music Festival with Rossen Milanov conducting; and at the Saratoga Performing Arts Center with Charles Dutoit conducting. She also sang Mozart's Regina Coeli and Coronation Mass with the New Hampshire Music Festival.

In the 2007–08 season, Zukerman performed with Music of the Baroque, the Gulbenkian Orchestra in Lisbon, the National Philharmonic, the Long Island Philharmonic, the Rapides Symphony Orchestra, the American Classical Orchestra, the Vermont Symphony Orchestra, and the National Philharmonic Orchestra. She also performed the role of Musetta in Puccini's La bohème in a concert version with the Philadelphia Orchestra. In addition, she gave a recital of Schumann lieder with pianist Marc Neikrug and perform with the Miami String Quartet at the Santa Fe Chamber Music Festival in July 2008.

Since 2008, Zukerman has been on the voice faculty of the Benjamin T. Rome School of Music of The Catholic University of America. In 2015, she was named Chair of Vocal Studies at the Wintergreen Summer Music Festival and Academy.

== Personal life ==
In 2007, Zukerman married Peter L. Sekulow, a group sales manager for the Washington Capitals hockey team.

== Recordings ==
- Soprano soloist, Handel's Messiah with the American Bach Soloists, 2005
- Gian Carlo Menotti's The Consul with the Berkshire Opera Company, 1999
