= Valley Symphony Orchestra =

Valley Symphony Orchestra may refer to:

- Valley Symphony Orchestra (LAVC), of the Los Angeles Valley College in California
- Valley Symphony Orchestra (McAllen, Texas)
