= Aviel (name) =

Aviel (Hebrew: אביאל) can be both a unisex given name and a surname. Notable people with the name include.

== Given name ==
- Aviel Barclay, Canadian soferet
- Aviel Roshwald, American historian
- Aviel Zargari, Israeli football defensive midfielder

== Surname ==
- Avraham Aviel, Polish-born Jewish writer
- Noam Aviel, Israeli orchestral conductor
- Sara Aviel, American economic policy advisor
