= Katia Popov =

Bulgarian violinist (1965–2018)

Katia Popov (Bulgarian: Катя Попов; 3 March 1965 – 18 May 2018), born in Bulgaria and later living in California, was a violinist, playing as soloist, in chamber music and in orchestras; she was concertmaster of the Hollywood Bowl Orchestra.

== Life ==
She was born in Sofia, Bulgaria; her father was an oboe player in the Sofia Radio Orchestra. She started playing the violin aged four. She studied at the Bulgarian Conservatory of Music, and at the Paris Conservatoire with Nell Gotkovsky; then at University of California, Los Angeles, with Alexander Treger and Iona Brown.

Katia Popov was a member of the Los Angeles Chamber Orchestra, and was a founder and first violinist of the California String Quartet, formed in 2002 with other members of the Los Angeles Chamber Orchestra. She was the first female concertmaster of the Hollywood Bowl Orchestra. She was concertmaster of the California Philharmonic Orchestra, and principal second violin in the Long Beach Symphony Orchestra. She was a guest soloist with orchestras in southern California, including the Los Angeles Philharmonic.

She was on the faculty of California State University, Long Beach. She was a session musician, playing in many film scores and albums.

Popov died in 2018, having received treatment for ovarian cancer for three years.
