= Kay George Roberts =

American orchestral conductor and professor of music

- Born: September 15, 1950; Nashville, Tennessee
- Education: Fisk University; Yale University
- Occupation(s): Conductor and Professor
- Employer: University of Massachusetts Lowell

Kay George Roberts (born September 15, 1950) is an American orchestral conductor and a professor of music at the University of Massachusetts-Lowell. She is the founder and musical director of the New England Orchestra. She is recognized as the first woman and second African American to receive a doctorate in musical arts from Yale University. As of 2018, she is one of the few female African American conductors in the world.

== Early life and education ==
Roberts was born September 16, 1950, in Nashville, Tennessee. Roberts began playing the violin in the fourth grade for the Cermona Strings Youth ensemble. In 1964, she successfully auditioned for the Nashville Youth Symphony, which at the time was under the direction of Thor Johnson. At the age of 17, she was moved to the parent Nashville Symphony ensemble, where in 1971, she became the first violinist to represent the Nashville Symphony in the World Symphony Orchestra, which was directed by Arthur Fiedler.

In 1972, Roberts graduated from Fisk University with her Bachelor of Arts in Music. She later attended Yale University School of Music, where she graduated with her Masters in Music in Conducting and Violin Performance in 1975, then her Masters in Musical Arts in Conducting in 1976. Later in 1986, she became the first woman and second black person to receive a doctoral degree in orchestral conducting from Yale University.

== Career and impact ==
During her time at Fisk University, Roberts was a fellow at Tanglewood, where she worked with renowned composer Leonard Bernstein, serving as a violinist in his orchestra. During her time at Yale, she was under the tutelage of master composer Otto-Werner Muller, who later arranged for her to conduct lead performances at the Nashville Symphony Orchestra, which was her debut as a conductor, and the Atlanta Symphony Orchestra. She has also conducted workshops, master classes, and seminars with other famous composers, including Denis de Coteau, Seiji Ozawa, Andre Previn, and John Eliot Gardnier. Roberts is one of the only female African American conductors in the world.

In 1982, Roberts became the lead director of New Hampshire Philharmonic Orchestra. She also has guest conducted for orchestras across the world, including the Orchestra della Svizzera Italiana in Switzerland, the Cleveland Symphony, the Detroit Symphony, and Bangkok Symphony in Thailand. In 1978, she joined the faculty at the University of Massachusetts Lowell where she currently works. Roberts is the founder and musical director of the New England Orchestra, and the principal conductor for Opera North, Inc. in Philadelphia. She also founded the UMass Lowell String project, which helps K-12 students receive musical education.

== Awards and honors ==
Roberts has received several awards throughout her career including "The Certificate of Special Congressional Recognition" from the U.S House of Representatives, for the work she has done in the community. She is also a recipient of the University of Massachusetts Presidents Public Service Award, and Distinguished Alumna of the Year, from the National Association for Equal Opportunity in Higher Education (NAFEO).
