= Neil Galanter =

American musician

Neil Galanter is an American pianist and composer in Los Angeles, California, who is a leading specialist in researching, recording and performing the works of Iberian/Spanish, Catalan, Belgian, and other European composers including Mompou, Montsalvatge, Granados, Albéniz, Blancafort, Esplá, and Poot. He has also given the Australian, New Zealand, and European premieres of several works of such composers, including a work written for him by the British composer William Blezard in 2001. According to a reviewer of one of his performances on an Australian tour,

Galanter is a very accomplished American pianist ...with a reputation for researching and performing unusual and neglected repertoire. An impressive list of his many and varied academic achievements includes (that he was) recipient of a Fellowship and Spanish Music Prize two years running from the Government of Spain for extensive research into the origins of Spanish piano music.

He debuted as a pianist at age 12 with the Detroit Symphony Orchestra. His early studies were with Julius Chajes in Detroit. He has a bachelor's degree in music from University of Michigan, where he was a student of Theodore Lettvin, a Masters in performance from Temple University, and a Doctorate from University of Southern California. He also studied at the Juilliard School and the Manhattan School of Music. with Robert Goldsand.

On an Australasian tour in 2000, he performed in several cities including recitals in New South Wales, Brisbane, Australia, in Dunedin, New Zealand, and at the Music Centre in Christchurch, New Zealand. He also has toured throughout Europe extensively including appearances in Belfast, Cork, Coventry, Dublin, Birmingham, London as well as in Kassel , Berlin, Amsterdam, Paris and numerous other European cities.

His performance as a soloist with the Valley Symphony Orchestra, conducted by Robert Chauls, and partially sponsored by the Consulate General of Belgium in October 2007 was the first US performance of the Concerto for Piano by Belgian composer Marcel Poot. He has collaborated in chamber music, solo and duo concerts with members of the Los Angeles Philharmonic including performances with cellist Stephen Custer, and violinist Lawrence Sonderling amongst others.

He served as music director at the "first anniversary gala" of the "88’s Cabaret" in West Hollywood, California in May, 2008. He has worked with the Spanish and Flamenco dancer Inesita in cross genre, collaborative fusion performances of Spanish music and dance from varying centuries and styles including performances throughout California.
