= State Theatre (Eau Claire, Wisconsin) =

Coordinates: 44.81253°N 91.50015°W

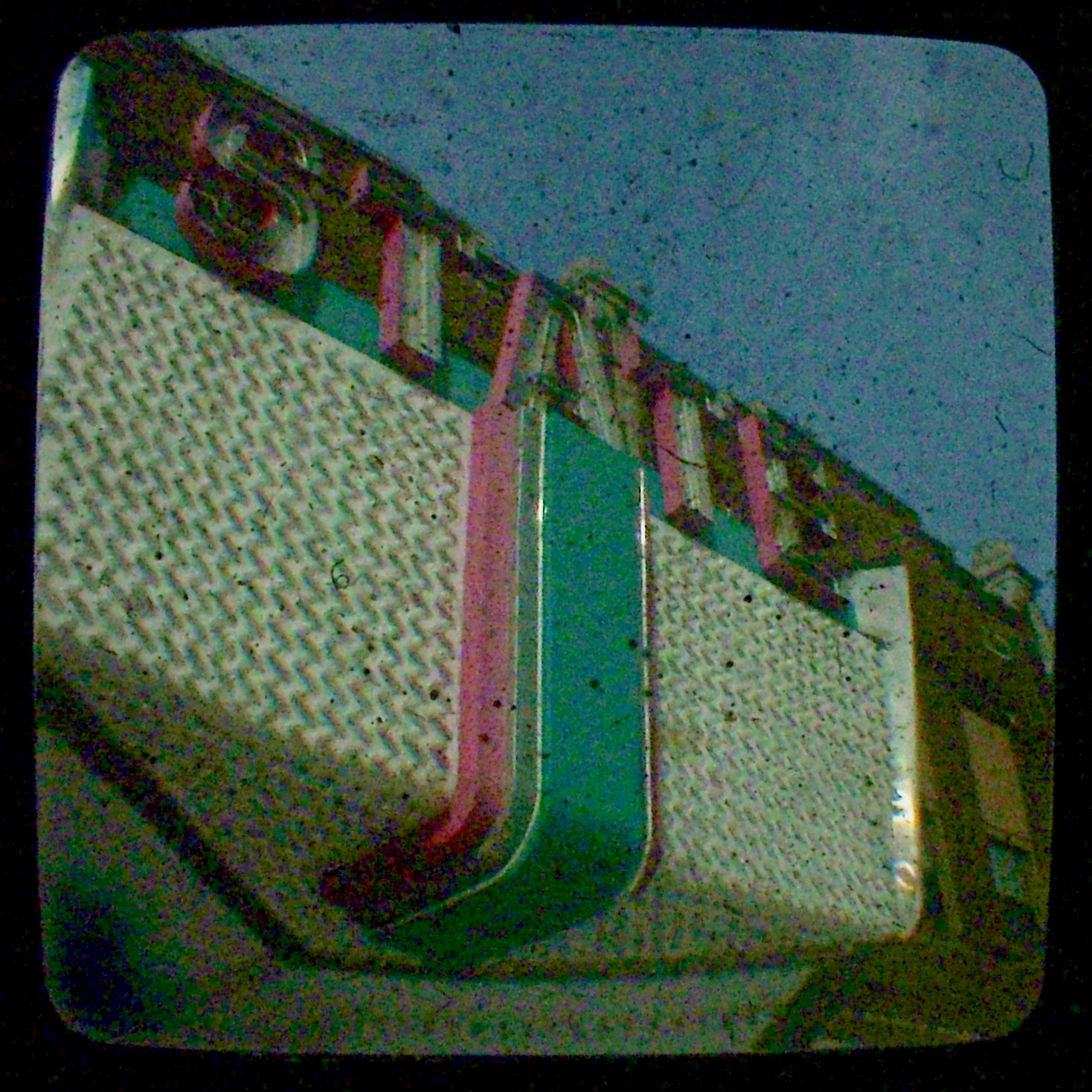
The State Theatre's facade.

The State Theatre is a venue for the performing arts and entertainment, located in downtown Eau Claire, Wisconsin, with seating for 1100 people.

== Architecture ==
The original State Theatre, built in 1925, is a large two-story brick Art Deco building designed by Joseph E. Nason. An addition was added in 1936. It is on the state and national register of historic buildings.

== History ==
The venue opened on January 19, 1926, as a vaudeville theater, then several years later converted to a movie house that closed in 1982.

In 1984 the Theatre was donated to a group of arts-minded community members called the Eau Claire Regional Arts Council (ECRAC) to create a center for artistic expression. After a significant renovation it reopened the doors in 1986. During the ECRAC period it was used by a number of local performing arts organizations including: Chippewa Valley Symphony, Chippewa Valley Theatre Guild, Chippewa Valley Youth Choirs, Eau Claire Children's Theatre, Valley Gospel Choir, and UW - Eau Claire. It closed in July 2018. The venue was purchased by Azara Properties LLC and leased to Luginbill children's foundation. The venue reopened in October 2019 as the State Theatre and Community Center, with Joe Luginbill as CEO.

In January 2020, it was announced that utilities to the State Theatre and Community Center had been cut off, due to a $21,000 utility debt.
