= O Pioneers! (opera) =

O Pioneers! is an American opera in two acts by composer Barbara Harbach, set to a libretto by Jonathan Yordy. It is based on the 1913 novel by Willa Cather. Harbach became enamored with Willa Cather's works when commissioned by the Central Wisconsin Symphony Orchestra to write a symphony based on Cather's 1922 novel One of Ours. When given the opportunity to compose an opera, she chose O Pioneers! because she has "always been drawn to stories about strong women." Harbach adds that Cather's story "has all the elements that an opera needs: long-term loving relationships, sibling rivalry and murder."

Harbach composed O Pioneers! between February 2008 and May 2009. She rendered the orchestration entirely on a computer. During the rehearsal period for the world premiere production (late September to early October 2009), she cut the piece for length and added interludes for scene changes and preludes before each act.

== St. Louis world premiere ==
The world premiere of O Pioneers! took place on October 9, 2009 at the Blanche M. Touhill Performing Arts Center on the campus of University of Missouri-St. Louis in a staging by the Chicago-based director Mark Meier. Scott Schoonover of Union Avenue Opera served as Artistic Director and Conductor. The production crew included designers Patrick Huber (scenic), Felia Katherine Davenport (costumes), Kimberly Klearman (lighting), property master Douglas Allebach, set builder Bryan Schulte, répétiteur Vera Parkin and stage manager Allyson Ditchey. The production was the result of a partnership developed by UMSL's College of Fine Arts and Communication, St. Louis Women's Chorale, Dimensions Dance Center and the Women In the Arts Initiative, an endowment begun in 2004 by composer Harbach and Thomas George (Chancellor of UMSL) to support women artists.

On December 5, 2009, a live recording of the world premiere production, recorded and mastered by Jeff Griswold, was broadcast on Classic 99 KFUO-FM in St. Louis as part of its weekly program Saturday Afternoon at the Opera.

=== Critical reception ===
Bridget Ryder of The Current (the University student newspaper):

"[T]he opera's development of the two main characters and insight into their inner struggle, combined with acting that plied the depth of both characters, brought the show to life.
...
"The performance built energy throughout, the characters becoming more complicated as their inner and outer struggles became more entangled by illicit love relationships, family feuds and eventually murder."
...
"The contrasting temperaments of Marie and Alexandra, a kind of sense-and-sensibility combination, provided changes in tone and a study in personality that made 'O Pioneers!' more dramatic and interesting than perhaps would be thought possible on a Nebraska farm."

== Libretto ==
Jonathan Yordy’s libretto draws upon plot events from Parts II, IV and V of the novel. As such, the opera begins when the main characters Alexandra Bergson, Emil Bergson, Carl Linstrum and Marie Shabata are all grown into adulthood. Several secondary and minor characters from the novel are not present, but the libretto includes the characters of Ivar, Frank Shabata, Amédée Chevalier, Angelique Chevalier and Alexandra’s brothers: Oscar and Lou. A choral ensemble of Nebraskan farmers and townspeople also appears in the opera.

== Premiere cast ==
Role	Performer
Alexandra Bergson	Gina Galati, soprano
Emil Bergson	Thomas Wazelle, tenor
Marie Shabata	Ann Hoyt, soprano
Carl Linstrum	Robert Boldin, tenor
Ivar	David Dillard, baritone
Frank Shabata	Ian Greenlaw, baritone
Amédée Chevalier	Joshua Stanton, tenor
Oscar Bergson	Philip Touchette, tenor
Lou Bergson	Thomas Sitzler, baritone

== Characters ==
- Alexandra Bergson

A pioneer farmer, strong and highly intelligent. After the father dies, the family works hard and finally becomes prosperous under Alexandra's direction. Her life is one of work and resolve. When childhood friend Carl Linstrum returns for a visit, she overcomes her natural reserve as the friendship slowly blossoms into love.

- Emil Bergson

He is the youngest son of the Bergson family. He was raised during the family's later prosperity rather than its early years of hardship on the farm. After a year in Mexico, he remains in love with Marie, who is unhappily married and whom he has loved since childhood.

- Carl Linstrum

Former neighbor of the Bergson's. After living out East for a number of years, returns West to visit his childhood home and seek his fortune in Alaska.

- Marie Shabata

Marie Shabata is of Bohemian descent. She is married to Frank Shabata and lives on land adjacent to Alexandra's.

- Frank Shabata

Marie's short-tempered husband. Something of a dandy when he married Marie, his life is now focused on wringing a meager existence from a stubborn, unyielding homestead.

- Lou and Oscar Bergson

The two remaining brothers of Emil and Alexandra. More brawny than brainy. Quick to anger and take offense. Suspicious of outsiders.

- Ivar

A simple Norwegian. man of the earth, in tune with nature and its seasons. A water witch, devout, pacifist, and lover of all things living.

- Amédée Chevalier

Emil's closest friend. A wealthy French farmer with a large, successful operation. Marrying his pretty bride Angelique.

== Synopsis ==
Place: Red Cloud, Nebraska.
Time: 1910.

=== Act One ===
Returning from Mexico for a wedding, Emil finds himself drawn to a sheltered orchard where his childhood sweetheart, Marie—now married—awaits. The bond between them is rekindled, and escalates into a clandestine passion. Emil's sister, Alexandra, a wealthy farmer and landowner, suspects but refuses to believe the worst. Her attentions are on Carl, a childhood friend who has returned from the East. Their friendship blossoms into love, amid family tensions over wealth, ownership, and the proper role of women.

These conflicts also bear upon Ivar, a rough seer who advises Alexandra on agricultural matters and offers periodic commentary on events as they unfold.

Things come to a head as the farmers and townsfolk gather for the Church fair. Carl decides to head west to Alaska after several unpleasant confrontations with Alexandra's brothers Oscar and Lou. Emil and Marie rush headlong into a barely hidden embrace.

=== Act Two ===
It is now harvest-time, and hard work, camaraderie, and community are the order of the day. Emil and Marie participate, but are under increasing strain as they contemplate what the future holds. Fate intervenes with a death—newly married Amédée, cut down in the fullness of his happiness. Emil and Marie are devastated, and cling passionately to each other in their need. Marie's husband Frank, in a drunken jealous rage, grabs his rifle and stumbles to the orchard. Seeing the couple lying in the grass, he blindly shoots, killing them both.

Their deaths stun the community, and Alexandra is numb with grievous shock. She buries them and mourns and tries to understand the wreckage. Carl eventually returns after having heard news of the tragedy and subsequent trial, and he and Alexandra begin a life of tenderness and measured happiness.
