= Peninsula Symphony Orchestra =

Peninsula Symphony Orchestra may refer to:

- Peninsula Symphony American symphony orchestra based in the San Francisco Peninsula
- Peninsula Symphony Orchestra, merged in 1979 to form the Virginia Symphony Orchestra
