= SMSO =

SMSO may refer to:

- Sayyidina 'Othman Secondary School (Malay: Sekolah Menengah Sayyidina 'Othman), secondary school in Tutong, Brunei
- Southern Miss Symphony Orchestra, orchestra in Mississippi, United States
