= Cármelo de los Santos =

- Born: 1977 (age 47–48); Brazil
- Occupation: Violinist
- Instrument: Violin
- Website: carmelodelossantos.com/bio/

Cármelo de los Santos (born 1977) is a violinist from Porto Alegre, RS, Brazil. He plays a 1929 Carl Fredrick Becker violin.

== Early life and education ==
De Los Santos was born in Brazil. He won the Eldorado Prize, in São Paulo, Brazil, when he was sixteen years old.

De los Santos earned his Bachelor of Music degree in Violin Performance from Rio Grande do Sul Federal University in Brazil. His Master of Music degree was accomplished at the Manhattan School of Music, also in Violin Performance. He subsequently earned a Doctoral degree from the University of Georgia. He studied under Fredi Gerling and Marcello Guerchfeld in Brazil, Sylvia Rosenberg in New York, and Levon Ambartsumian in Georgia.

== Career ==
In 2002, De los Santos performed as a soloist and conductor in the Weill Recital Hall at Carnegie Hall with the ARCO Chamber Orchestra. He has also performed as a guest soloist with more than 40 orchestras, including the New World Symphony, Santa Fe Pro-Musica, the Southern Mississippi, Santa Fe, and New Mexico symphonies, the Montevideo Philharmonic, Orchestra Musica d’Oltreoceano (Rome, Italy), as well as the Brazilian symphonies São Paulo State, Brazilian, and Petrobrás Sinfônica.

De los Santos has also performed at festivals, including the Bonneville Classical Music Festival and the South Carolina Chamber Music Festival.

He lives in Albuquerque, New Mexico, with his wife Eugenia and son Arthur.

== Awards ==
De los Santos won the first prize at the Júlio Cardona International String Competition (Portugal), first prize in the string section of the Music Teachers National Association (MTNA) 2001–2001 Young Artist Performance Competitions (USA), and the second prize in the Young Artist International Competition (Argentina). In 2009 de los Santos's CD Sonatas Brasileiras, with sonatas by Villa-Lobos, Guarnieri, and Santoro (UFRGS Label), won the Açorianos Prize (Brazil) for best Classical CD, along with the prize of Best Classical Performer.

== Repertoire ==
De los Santos' repertoire includes pieces from Bach, Berio, Piazzolla and Villa-Lobos, including all the major concertos for violin and orchestra. Contemporary premiere performances include works by Richard Hermann, Thomas Licata, Richard Cameron Wolfe, Gordon Mumma, Elisenda Fábregas, Kenji Bunch, Marc Mellits, and Paul Chihara.

His first CD under the Eldorado Radio label featured Brazilian and other composers of the twentieth century.

== Teaching ==
De los Santos as taught violin classes in the US, his native Brazil, and several other countries. He is an Associate Professor of Violin at the University of New Mexico. He has presented violin workshops at music festivals, including Schlern Music Festival (Schlern, Italy), International Lyric Academy (Rome, Italy), Jornada Musical Xalapa (Mexico), Premier Orchestral Institute (MS), Northern Lights (MN), String Encounter of the Puerto Rico Conservatory (PR), and in several Brazilian festivals.

== REVEL ==
De los Santos, pianist Carla McElhaney and cellist Joel Becktell formed the "classical band" REVEL, which is based in Austin, Texas. The group arranges both classical and modern works for duos and piano trio, and performs these in small venues.

In 2012 REVEL released an album, “Magic Hour” with REVEL.

== Discography ==
- “Magic Hour” - REVEL – works for piano trio by Beethoven, Piazzolla, and Kenji Bunch, plus original arrangements by the group. 2012
- “Sonatas Brasileiras” (Brazilian Sonatas) – Cármelo de los Santos and Ney Filakow. Federal University of Rio Grande do Sul, 2009.
- “Friendship” – Rahim AlHaj, oud, and Sadaka String Quartet. 2006.
- “I” – Contemporary Pieces for Guitar, Paulo Inda, guitar; Cármelo de los Santos, violin. 2005.
- “Antonio Vivaldi” – Concerto for Two Violins and Orchestra in A minor, Cármelo de los Santos and Dan Kaplunas, I and II violins; ARCO Chamber Orchestra. Arter Vostochny veter, Moscow, 2004.
- “VII Eldorado Music Award” – Cármelo de los Santos, violin; Catarina Domenici, piano. GRAVADORA ELDORADO 584.074, 1994.
