= UPO =

Upo or UPO may refer to:

== Organizations ==
- United Partisan Organization, Jewish resistance organization in the Vilna Ghetto
- Universidad Pablo de Olavide, a university in Seville, Spain
- United Planning Organization, Washington's community action agency for Capital Area Food Bank

== Musical groups ==
- U.P.O., a post-grunge band from Los Angeles, California
- Ural Philharmonic Orchestra, from Yekaterinburg, Russia
- Urbana Pops Orchestra, Urbana, Illinois, United States

== Other uses ==
- Upo, Shita people, Ethiopia
- Upo Wetland, Changnyeong County, South Korea
- Unpentoctium, an unsynthesized chemical element
- Unit Post Orderlies, see history of the British Army postal service
- ÇOMÜ Ulupınar Observatory, Turkey
- Upo, the Filipino name for calabash
