= Barbara Harbach =

American classical composer

- Born: 14 February 1946 (age 80); Lock Haven, Pennsylvania, U.S.
- Occupations: Composer, Harpsichordist, Organist and teacher
- Instruments: Harpsichord, Organ (music)
- Years active: 1964 – Present

Barbara Harbach (born February 14, 1946) is an American composer, harpsichordist, organist, and teacher. Since 2004, she taught music at the University of Missouri-St. Louis. She founded Women in the Arts-St. Louis to highlight women's work and gain more performances for musicians and composers.

In 1989, Harbach founded the small Vivace Press, to publish music by underrepresented composers. In 1993 she was a co-founder of the journal, Women of Note Quarterly, and continues as its editor.

== Early life and education ==
Born in Lock Haven, Pennsylvania, Harbach studied music, and harpsichord and organ performance at Penn State University, where she earned a BA. She earned an MMA at Yale and doctorate in composition from the Eastman School of Music.

She also studied at the Musikhochschule in Frankfurt, Germany with Helmut Walcha.

== Career ==
Harbach was Professor of Music at Washington State University from 1991 to 1997, Visiting Professor of Music at University of Wisconsin–Oshkosh from 1997 to 2000, and Visiting Professor of Fine Arts at the University of Wisconsin–Stevens Point from 2000 to 2003. In 2004, she was named Professor of Music at the University of Missouri-St. Louis.

Harbach has made numerous recordings of organ and harpsichord music and is a nationally recognized keyboard performer. When reviewing one of her Bach recordings in its May/June 1988 issue, the American Record Guide said, "She deserves to be recognized as one of the eminent Bach players among organists of the present day, in both the United States and in Europe." In 1992, Keyboard Magazine ranked Harbach as second to Keith Jarrett as “Top Keyboard Artist” in the classical division.

== Works ==
Her first published composition was Praise Him with the Trumpet (1977) for choir and organ. Her compositions have included works for symphony orchestra, string orchestra, organ, harpsichord, choir and chamber ensemble. She has also arranged Baroque pieces for brass and organ.

She has written three symphonies: Veneration for Orchestra (first performed in 2004 at Wilmington College, Ohio), One of Ours – a Cather Symphony (commissioned by and first performed by the Central Wisconsin Symphony Orchestra) and Sinfonietta for string orchestra. Seven more symphonies were written. She didn't number her symphonies. A State Divided - A Missouri Symphony, Gateway Festival Symphony, Jubilee Symphony, Night Soundings (6th), Celestial Symphony (9th) and Symphony for Ferguson (10th)

A recording of her music, The Music of Barbara Harbach, Vol. 1, received the following honors:

- RECORDING OF THE YEAR 2008, Bob Briggs, MusicWeb International, January 2009;
- CRITICS CHOICE 2008, American Record Guide, January / February 2009
- MUSOC.ORG 2009, Classics of Contemporary Art Music, November 2009

In October 2009, Harbach's opera O Pioneers!, based upon the Willa Cather novel of the same name, received its world premiere at the University of Missouri-St. Louis.

=== Other activities ===
In 1989, Harbach founded Vivace Press, a music publishing company specializing in works by women and other traditionally under-represented composers. She produces performing editions of 18th-century keyboard music.

In 1993, Harbach and Jonathan Yordy founded the journal, Women of Note Quarterly, and shared editing responsibilities. She continues as editor.

In 2004, Harbach founded Women in the Arts-St. Louis, devoted to creating more opportunities for audiences to see and hear women composers and other artists, as well as encouraging education and recognition of women artists.

== Honors ==
- In 2002, Harbach received an honorary doctorate of music degree from Wilmington College of Ohio.
- 2006 for her work on Women in the Arts-St. Louis, she received the Arts Education Award from the Missouri Arts Council; the Missouri Citizen for the Arts Award; the Yellow rose Award from the Zonta International Club of St. Louis; and the UM-St. Louis College of Fine Arts and Communication, Faculty Excellence Award
- 2007 she was awarded the Hellenic Spirit Foundation Award.
