= Big Five (orchestras) =

Ranking of American symphony orchestras

The Big Five are five American symphony orchestras that historically led the field in "musical excellence, calibre of musicianship, total contract weeks, weekly basic wages, recording guarantees, and paid vacations". In order of foundation, they are the New York Philharmonic (1842), the Boston Symphony Orchestra (1881), the Chicago Symphony Orchestra (1891), the Philadelphia Orchestra (1900), and the Cleveland Orchestra (1918). The term gained currency in the late 1950s and for some years afterwards.

== Origins ==
The term "Big Five" was coined around the time when long-playing recordings became available, regular orchestral radio broadcasts were expanding, and the five orchestras that make up the group had annual concert series in New York City. By the mid-20th century, with recordings and radio broadcasts dominated by East Coast ensembles, the most prominent orchestras were known as the "Big Three": New York, Boston, and Philadelphia. While this label was still being used in the late 1950s (e.g. Newsweek, February 17, 1958), the growing prestige of the Cleveland Orchestra under George Szell and the Chicago Symphony Orchestra under Fritz Reiner at this time saw the "Big Three" become the "Big Five".

== Gramophone 2008 ranking ==
In 2008, Gramophone published a critics' poll ranking of the top twenty symphony orchestras in the world. Seven American orchestras were numbered among them. The 20 were, in rank order, with the American ones highlighted in bold: the Royal Concertgebouw Orchestra (1), the Berlin Philharmonic (2), the Vienna Philharmonic (3), the London Symphony Orchestra (4), the Chicago Symphony Orchestra (5), the Bavarian Radio Symphony Orchestra (6), the Cleveland Orchestra (7), the Los Angeles Philharmonic (8), the Budapest Festival Orchestra (9), the Dresden Staatskapelle (10), the Boston Symphony Orchestra (11), the New York Philharmonic (12), the San Francisco Symphony (13), the Mariinsky Theatre Orchestra (14), the Russian National Orchestra (15), the St. Petersburg Philharmonic (16), the Leipzig Gewandhaus Orchestra (17), the Metropolitan Opera Orchestra (18), the Saito Kinen Orchestra (19), and the Czech Philharmonic (20).

== Modern use ==
People still refer to the "Big Five", but many deem the classification outdated. Several critics have suggested that the top echelon be expanded, including Michael Walsh in Time magazine in 1983; and Mark Swed in the Los Angeles Times, 2005. Among the orchestras proposed for inclusion are the Los Angeles Philharmonic, the San Francisco Symphony, the Atlanta Symphony Orchestra, the Pittsburgh Symphony Orchestra, the Houston Symphony, the Baltimore Symphony Orchestra, the National Symphony Orchestra (Washington, D.C.), the Minnesota Orchestra (Minneapolis), and the St. Louis Symphony Orchestra.

In the 21st century, some observers of American orchestras suggest that the "Big Five" designation is no longer meaningful. Gary Hanson, former executive director of the Cleveland Orchestra, commented in 2013 that an orchestra's reputation was once an important factor in its "ability to compete for talent", meaning "there was a direct relationship between reputation and quality." Greater geographic mobility of musicians, the rarity of major orchestral recording contracts, and the existence of major year-round orchestras in more American cities have reduced the importance of the prestige that was once associated with the Big Five. The New York Times suggested that "climate and cost of living are as likely to figure in a musician's choice of employer as an orchestra's historic renown." Additionally, the availability of a large number of talented young musicians is described as a "leveling factor" that enhances the quality of all American orchestras.

== See also ==
- List of symphony orchestras in the United States
