= Fremont Symphony Orchestra =

Orchestra in Fremont, California, U.S.

- Orchestra
- Former name: Fremont Philharmonic
- Founded: 1964, by Eugene Stoia
- Later name: Fremont-Newark Philharmonic Society
- Location: Fremont, California, U.S.

The Fremont Symphony Orchestra was established in Fremont, California, in 1964 initially as a community orchestra and was first called the Fremont Philharmonic and later the Fremont-Newark Philharmonic Society.

== History ==
The Fremont Philharmonic Society was created in 1964 by Eugene Stoia, the orchestra's first music director, who brought together a group of musicians and supporters of the arts to realize their common dream of a local symphony orchestra. The initial rehearsal was set for September, and the first concert was planned for that winter at Fremont's Mission San Jose High School.

The musicians received no compensation at the time and merely played for the love of music. The people of Fremont responded by attending the concerts and supporting this new orchestra they could call their own. In 1970, the name was changed to the Fremont-Newark Philharmonic to better reflect the orchestra's membership and audience base.

Following its modest beginnings, when musicians had to pay one dollar to join, the orchestra grew and matured impressively both in quality and in numbers. Music director Eugene Stoia was succeeded by William Galbraith and Jason Klein, and the orchestra's sound also improved as a few professional musicians were hired to fill strategic positions.

David Sloss was chosen as music director in 1980, and by 1983, all musicians were paid and the caliber of musicians gradually upgraded to a fully professional organization. In 1994, the orchestra adopted the name Fremont Symphony Orchestra and performed exclusively at the Gary Soren Smith Center for the Fine and Performing Arts at Ohlone College (Fremont Campus) for the next twenty seasons.

In 2012, Gregory Van Sudmeier succeeded David Sloss as music director. In 2014, Sudemeier announced his decision to move across the country but offered to continue conducting if needed.

In January 2015, the board of directors announced the decision to launch a guest-conductor series beginning with former music director Jason Klein, who conducted a romantic concert on Valentine's Day, followed by Michael Morgan, Jung-ho Pak, and Dawn Harms in subsequent concerts.

In May 2016, the orchestra performed a special concert, led by Michael Morgan and introducing three gifted young conductors: Matilda Hofman, Andrew Whitfield, and Tyler Catlin. In the 2016–17 season, guest conductors included former music director David Sloss, Dawn Harms, and John Farrer.

In 2014, Prince of Peace Lutheran Church was introduced as an alternate performance venue in addition to the Smith Center at Ohlone College.

The Fremont Symphony Orchestra is a nonprofit organization and a member of the League of American Orchestras and the Association of California Symphony Orchestras (ACSO).

== Performances ==
The orchestra provides a subscription concert series featuring four or five performances of classical symphonic music each season, in addition to numerous educational performances and programs for children. The orchestra's Young Artist Competition has launched the careers of many young musicians who later rose to international stardom, most notably Aileen Chanco, Natasha Paremski, and Chloe Pang. In 2005, the Fremont Symphony Orchestra performed Fremont's first full-length ballet production, Tchaikovsky's The Nutcracker, choreographed by Yoko Young. The orchestra currently performs at the Prince of Peace Lutheran Church and at the Gary Soren Smith Center for the Fine and Performing Arts of Ohlone College.

== See also ==
- List of symphony orchestras in the United States
- Music of California
