= North State Symphony =

Orchestra in Northern California, U.S.

- Orchestra
- Music director: Scott Seaton
- Website: northstatesymphony.org

The North State Symphony is an orchestra which is an amalgamation of the former Chico and Redding Symphonies in Northern California. Its original conductor and musical director was Kyle Wiley Pickett, who stepped down at the conclusion of the 2013–2014 season. Its members include professionals from a wide geographic area, community members, university students, and faculty members.

It was announced on June 17, 2015, that the new music director of the symphony was to be the award-winning conductor Scott Seaton. Seaton recently completed his third season as music director of the Minot Symphony Orchestra in North Dakota, where he conducted classical, family, education, and pops concerts and worked with internationally acclaimed guest artists. He has also served as assistant conductor of Festival Opera in Walnut Creek, California, and has held posts with the Kent State University Orchestra, the Lakeland Civic Orchestra, and the Nashville Youth Symphony, as well as other orchestral groups.
