= Rochelle Abramson =

American violinist (1953–2025)

- Born: Detroit, Michigan, U.S.
- Died: December 18, 2025
- Occupation: Violinist

Rochelle S. Abramson (died December 18, 2025) was an American violinist in Los Angeles.

== Early life and career ==
Born in Detroit Michigan, Abramson began studying the violin at age five. She attended Cass Tech, University of Michigan, and earned her Master's degree in 1975 at Juilliard, where she studied with Mischa Mischakoff, Angel Reyes. and Donna DeLay.

Abramson was a first violinist with the Los Angeles Philharmonic. She served as concertmaster of various local orchestras, including concertmaster with the Valley Symphony Orchestra.

She joined the Los Angeles Philharmonic in its 1978–79 season. She received two individual artist's grants from the City of Los Angeles Cultural Affairs Department.

Abramson died on December 18, 2025.
