= William Blezard =

British pianist and composer (1921–2003)

- Born: 10 March 1921; Padiham, Lancashire, England
- Died: 2 March 2003 (aged 81) Barnes, London
- Genres: Light music
- Instrument: Piano
- Years active: 1946 - 2003
- Formerly of: Joyce Grenfell, Marlene Dietrich, Honor Blackman, Laurence Olivier, Noël Coward

William Blezard (10 March 1921 in Padiham, Lancashire – 2 March 2003 in Barnes, London) was a pianist and composer who was musical director to Noël Coward, Marlene Dietrich and Joyce Grenfell.

== Personal life ==
Blezard's parents worked in one of Padiham's many cotton mills as weavers. Like many other local children, as a child he wore clogs, traditional for the area and not a sign of poverty. His tenor father sang semi-professionally. The mill-owner's daughter spotted his musical talent initially on the harmonium and persuaded the mill owner, Teddy Higham, to pay for piano lessons. In 1938 he left Clitheroe Royal Grammar School where he had played Gershwin's Rhapsody in Blue, having won a Lancashire county scholarship to the Royal College of Music in London where he was a pupil of Arthur Benjamin.

In 1954 he married musical conductor Joan Kemp-Potter, whom he met at the Royal College. She was the conductor of the Leatherhead Choral Society and the Sutton Symphony Orchestra (1974-1992) as well as a teacher at the Guildhall School of Music and the London College of Music and an artist. She died in 2001, aged 80. He had cared for her after she had had a severe stroke in 1994. They had a son and daughter, known as Paul and Pookie.

Blezard never stopped working to improve his piano technique. He lost his boyhood stammer and broad Lancashire accent in early adulthood but fought personal demons of doubt and worry all his life.

He and his family lived in a rambling house just off Barnes Common, the living room dominated by his grand piano. Whenever he wanted to emphasise a point, he would leap up to demonstrate on the keys. He never retired and the night before he died he was performing at a charity concert in Barnes.

== War work ==
He joined the Royal Air Force at the outbreak of the Second World War and became a Morse code operator in Wick, Scotland.

== Postwar career ==
In 1946 he returned to the Royal College, and studied piano with Arthur Benjamin and Frank Merrick, composition with Herbert Howells, and orchestration with Gordon Jacob. He won the Cobbett Prize for a composition for a Fantasy String Quartet. He then wrote music for Muir Mathieson's documentary films, at Denham Film Studios near the village of Denham, and many others including "The Cardboard Cavalier", 1949, starring Margaret Lockwood and the film version of Noël Coward's play "The Astonished Heart" in 1950 starring Celia Johnson. Another was Beau Brummell, 1954, starring Stewart Granger, Peter Ustinov, Elizabeth Taylor and Robert Morley.

In 1954 Blezard had arranged a performance for two pianos with Donald Swann and Sydney Carter. Swann introduced him to Joyce Grenfell, and she engaged him as her musical director. During rehearsals the same year for the show "Joyce Grenfell Requests the Pleasure", Blezard married the conductor Joan Kemp Potter. The show lasted for over a year, ending its West End run at St Martin's Theatre. The piano was so bad that Blezard asked the management to buy an upright Bechstein at Harrods' sale.

After this production, Grenfell decided that Blezard's piano skills were such that she no longer needed an orchestra as he could play any tune by ear, arrange it in any key or style and transcribe it on to paper without a piano. She wrote in her first, 1976, autobiography, "In Pleasant Places":

"He is compounded of compressed energy, employed at its best when he is playing the piano, then it is wholly controlled. His familiarity with the keyboard has the naturalness of breathing; and he moves in it with confidence, dexterity and grace

From 1954 to 1973 he composed many of Grenfell's songs and spoof operettas such as Freda and Eric. They performed on stage and television all over Britain, America and Australia. He could play her entire repertoire from memory, even though she often changed the running order at the last moment. To warm up before a show they would improvise fake Debussy and mock Schubert; he learned to play over hailstorms in Melbourne, cowboy films in Sydney, bagpipes in Auckland and the police radio on Grenfell's mike.

Grenfell insisted on Blezard's getting equal credit, and would complain to the organisers if he was left off a poster or not mentioned in a review. She also pushed for higher fees, and persuaded the BBC to increase his fee from 10 to 200 guineas for two Cabaret television shows. Diana Lyddon, stage manager for Grenfell's 1960 British tour, said:

"The venues were often town halls. They were all under contract to provide a tuned Steinway grand. As I was trying to fix the lighting, Bill would stomp in and say: 'Bloody awful piano again'. The next time we toured together I always checked in advance.

At Grenfell's last performance, at the Waterloo Dinner in Windsor Castle in June 1973, she insisted she would only dine with the Queen if the Blezards were also invited. The Queen chose the programme, including Blezard's favourite "The Battle March of Delhi", a melodramatic Victorian song involving colonels, marauders and bugles.

Grenfell supported the Blezard family in many ways: she bought them a dishwasher one Christmas; wrote birthday songs for their children, and contributed (unwittingly) to his son's first motorbike. Every summer, Joyce and Reggie Grenfell treated William and Joan to a week at the Aldeburgh Music Festival. For the royal opening of Snape Maltings concert hall in 1967, Blezard and Grenfell composed a surprise song for Benjamin Britten who was so overwhelmed that he burst into tears.

In 1957, he worked on two Royal Shakespeare Company productions with Peter Brook: Titus Andronicus and The Tempest. The same year he was musical director in London and New York for John Osborne's The Entertainer, starring Laurence Olivier as the failed music-hall artist Archie Rice. He performed the same role for Max Wall 20 years later.

On the BBC2 launch in 1964, Blezard was a musical director for the children's programme Play School with Johnny Ball and Brian Cant. Anne Reay, one of the producers said:

"His job was to improvise music to the action of the presenters – anything from a storm at sea to ice-cream melting. His interpretation was always exuberant."

In 1965 he took over from Burt Bacharach as Marlene Dietrich's musical director and toured with her worldwide. He said:

"We had a row in every Hilton in Europe. But she always made up for it in champagne afterwards."

He was with Dietrich in Australia in 1975 when she broke her leg on stage in her final performance. In the 1970s he worked on the TV adult literacy programme On the Move with Rolf Harris. He also worked with Elisabeth Welch in her one-woman show A Marvellous Party. In 1983 Sheridan Morley used Blezard as musical director for the show about Noël Coward and Gertrude Lawrence, Noël and Gertie, which began a long run with Joanna Lumley at the King's Head, Islington. Lumley said:

"It was a tiny cast in a tiny theatre with no dressing rooms but Bill helped make it one of the happiest jobs I ever did. He was a life-enhancer who treated every performance as if it was the Wigmore Hall".

Blezard was musical director in 1986 for the musical Café Puccini by Robin Ray with Nichola McAuliffe at the Wyndham's Theatre, and then played for Honor Blackman in The Life and Times of Yvette Guilbert and Dishonorable Ladies. Blezard and Blackman worked together for the next 10 years, Blackman said: "William was my staunch support and brilliant accompanist. No one, but no one will ever be as good."

He also wrote numerous piano and chamber music pieces spanning his entire career which are representative of many genres, styles and touches including Sonatinas, Preludes, Scherzi, numerous character pieces and a set of variations written in his later life dedicated to the American pianist Neil Galanter. His own favourite composition, written in 1951, was the dark, quasi-mahlerian Duetto (for string ensemble), which his wife Joan Kemp-Potter also considered his most accomplished work. His orchestral music, in which the influence of his hero Maurice Ravel is easily detectable, particularly in its harmonic patterns, has enjoyed a significant revival since the late 1990s after a long period of neglect. Most of his major works are now available on commercial recordings. William Blezard was also a prolific arranger, who collaborated on several occasions with pop singer-songwriter Louis Philippe towards the end of his life.

== CD recordings ==
- The Piano Music of William Blezard (2001) played by Eric Parkin, in two volumes (Priory Records, 1999, 2003)
- Battersea Park Suite, on the collection British Light Music Discoveries 4, (ASV, 2002)
- Caramba (1966), released on British Light Overtures (ASV, 2002)
- Duetto (1951), on English String Miniatures, Vol 3 (ASV, 2001)
- Noel and Gertie by Sir Noël Coward, William Blezard, Original London Cast (TER 1117, 1986)
- The River (1969), on The British Light Music Collection, Vol. 1 (Resonance, 2007)
- Soliloquy and Quirky Waltz, on The Oboe d'Amore Collection, Vol. 2 (Amoris International 1997)
- Two Celtic Pieces, on English Oboe Concertos (ASV, 2001)
