= Eugenia Zukerman =

American flutist, writer, and journalist

Eugenia Rich Zukerman (born September 25, 1944, Cambridge, Massachusetts) is an American flutist, writer, and journalist. An internationally renowned flute virtuoso, Zukerman has been performing with major orchestras and at major music festivals internationally for more than three decades. Since 1980 she has been the Classical Music Correspondent for CBS News Sunday Morning where she has profiled hundreds of artists. She was the Artistic Director of the lauded Bravo! Vail Valley Music Festival from 2003 to 2010.

== Education and personal life ==
Eugenia Rich was initially an English major at Barnard College but decided to transfer to the Juilliard School in 1964 to pursue music studies under Julius Baker. She graduated in 1966 and two years later married violinist Pinchas Zukerman. The couple had two daughters together, opera singer Arianna Zukerman and blues/folk musician Natalia Zukerman. They frequently appeared together in concert until their divorce in 1985.

Rich is a sister of Julie R. Ingelfinger, deputy editor at the New England Journal of Medicine, professor of pediatrics at Harvard Medical School, and consulting pediatric nephrologist at Massachusetts General Hospital.

== Career ==
=== Performer ===
In 1969 Zukerman appeared at the Festival dei Due Mondi in Italy, and in 1970 she won the Young Concert Artists International Auditions. The competition win led to her debut recital at New York City's Town Hall in 1971. The recital was lauded by music critics and she was soon engaged to perform in concerts and recitals all over the world, including performances with the Los Angeles Philharmonic, the Minnesota Orchestra, the English Chamber Orchestra, the Israel Chamber Orchestra, and the National Symphony Orchestra of Washington, D.C. to name just a few. Since 1998 she has been the Artistic Director of the Bravo! Vail Valley Music Festival which currently boasts three resident orchestras: the Rochester Philharmonic, the Philadelphia Orchestra and the New York Philharmonic.

=== Correspondent ===
In 1980 Zukerman joined the staff of CBS News Sunday Morning as its classical music correspondent and held that position for more than 25 years. She has also contributed articles to The New York Times, The Washington Post, Esquire and Vogue. She has also published two novels, Deceptive Cadence (Viking, 1981) and Taking the Heat (Simon and Schuster, 1991). She is also the editor and contributor to an anthology of essays entitled In My Mother's Closet (Sorin Books, 2003), which includes entries by accomplished women on their thoughts on the mother/daughter relationship. Other contributors to the anthology include Renée Fleming, Carrie Fisher, Joy Behar, Judy Collins, Erica Jong and Claire Bloom.

The anthology was featured in the April 2003 edition of O, The Oprah Magazine. Zukerman also co-authored a non-fiction work, Coping with Prednisone (and Other Cortisone-Related Medicines): It May Work Miracles but How Do You Handle the Side Effects (St. Martin's Press, 1997), with her sister Julie Rich Inglefinger, M.D. The book chronicles Zukerman's own experience with the side effects of a medication she took when she was suffering from eosinophilic pneumonitis, which she battled in 1995–1996.

In November 2019, she revealed that she had been diagnosed with "cognitive difficulties" (Alzheimer's disease).
