= Crawford Gates =

American musician, composed for the LDS Church

Crawford Marion Gates (December 29, 1921 – June 9, 2018) was an American musician, composer, and conductor known for his contributions to the body of music for The Church of Jesus Christ of Latter-day Saints (LDS Church).

== Early life and education ==
Gates was born in San Francisco, December 29, 1921, and grew up in Palo Alto, California. He started playing piano at age eight and violin at age nine. In his first year of college at the College of the Pacific and San Jose State, he won a student composition contest sponsored by the Stockton Symphony During his mission for the LDS Church, he directed the Mormon Male Chorus of Philadelphia, a group of eight other missionaries. The chorus performed for local radio stations, including WFIL. Gates wrote forty-three arrangements for the choir.

Gates received a BA "with great distinction" from San Jose State University in 1943. From September 1944 until August 1945 he was stationed in Pearl Harbor but never sent into combat. He studied for his MA from Brigham Young University from 1946 to 1948, studying there with Leroy Robertson. Gates earned his Ph.D. from the Eastman School of Music under Howard Hanson in 1954. He studied there from 1948 to 1950, and returned to study in the summers of 1951 and 1954.

== Music career ==
=== College teaching ===
He was a member of the music faculty at Brigham Young University during the summers of 1948 to 1960, full-time from 1950 to 1966. He conducted the chorus there from 1950 to 1958. He was the chair of BYU's music department from 1960 to 1966, and conducted the BYU Symphony 1964 to 1966. Gates was a professor of music and artist in residence at Beloit College in Wisconsin from 1966 to 1989. From 1982 to 1987 he was the Chair of Music at Beloit College. After his retirement from Beloit College in 1989, he continued his work as an emeritus artist-in-residence.

=== Conducting ===
Gates was the music director of the Beloit-Janesville Symphony Orchestra for 34 years (1963–1964, 1966–1999), where he prepared orchestral and orchestral-choral arrangements for annual pops and children's concerts. He was the music director of the Quincy Symphony from 1969 to 1970 and of the Rockford Symphony Orchestra from 1970 to 1986. While conducting the Rockford Symphony Orchestra, he professionalized the orchestra. He guest conducted for the Utah Symphony twenty-five times.

At Tanglewood in 1957, Gates studied orchestral conducting with Eleazar de Carvalho. In the summer of 1967, he studied conducting with Hans Swarowsky.

=== Composing ===
Since age eight, Gates composed or arranged nearly 900 titles. His works have been performed by the Philadelphia Orchestra, the Chicago Symphony Orchestra, the Los Angeles Philharmonic and orchestras in Dallas, Kansas City, Rochester and Milwaukee. Gates had musical relationships (guest conducting, recording, commissioned compositions and premieres) with five major musical organizations in Utah: the Utah Symphony, the Mormon Tabernacle Choir, the Orchestra at Temple Square, Ballet West, the Utah Opera and the Oratorio Society of Utah.

He wrote the music score to the play Promised Valley (1947), celebrating the centennial entrance of Mormon pioneers into the Salt Lake Valley. This stage work has been produced over 2,700 times, in six languages and on five continents. He composed and orchestrated the score from January until July 22, 1947, just before the first performance. The first performances were produced in the University of Utah stadium, which held 12,500 people at the time.

Gates is most known for his works with religious themes. In 1953, Harold Hansen, the director of the pageant, asked Gates to write an original score for the Hill Cumorah Pageant. This church assignment was approved by the first presidency of the LDS Church. His teaching schedule and local church service did not leave him much time to compose, so the score was not complete until 1957. During this time, he studied composition with Ernst Toch at UCLA in 1954. After having difficulty composing the Christ theme for the Hill Cumorah Pageant, he received a blessing from Harold B. Lee, which told him he would "hear the music in the night." After hearing the music in a dream, Gates composed what he felt was the "right" theme.

In 1987, Gates started composing a new score for Orson Scott Card's new script for the Hill Cumorah Pageant. Gates conducted the Mormon Tabernacle Choir, Utah Symphony Orchestra, and Salt Lake Children's choir to make a recording of the new score to use in rehearsals. He composed two hymns in the LDS hymn book: "Our Savior’s Love" and "Ring Out, Wild Bells", and wrote the music for two hymns in the LDS Children's Songbook: "On a Golden Springtime" and "Baptism".

In 1976, Gates premiered his Symphony No. 4: A New Morning based on a text by Carol Lynn Pearson, for the United States Bicentennial. Milton Barlow commissioned Gates to write the ballet Desert As A Rose for Utah's statehood centennial in 1996. Gates collaborated with William Auld to write an Esperanto hymn, which premiered at the 76th Universala Kongreso in 1991. Claudia Bushman, Gates's sister-in-law, encouraged him to write an opera on Joseph Smith. Gates wrote Joseph! Joseph!, which was performed in 2004 and 2005.

== Awards and legacy ==
In 1955, Gates won the Max Wald Memorial Fund's first composition competition for his Symphony No.1, written for his doctoral dissertation.

Gates's works have won the American Society of Composers, Authors and Publishers (ASCAP) every year from 1967 to 1989. In 1997, Gates received a Governor's Commendation from Tommy Thompson for his musical service in southern Wisconsin. In 1998, he received a Rotary Club Service Above Self award.

In 2010, the instrumental qualities of Gates's choral arrangements were the subject of a doctoral dissertation by Matthew Thompson at Kansas University.

== Personal life ==
Crawford Gates married Georgia Lauper on December 19, 1952. They had four children. Crawford and Georgia moved to Salt Lake City in 1999. Gates died June 9, 2018, at the age of 96.

== In other media ==
Gates appears together with Gordon B. Hinckley and two other Latter-day Saint missionaries who visit the protagonists of the 2019 film The Fighting Preacher in order to tour the Sacred Grove on their ways home from missionary service. In fact, Gates's mission occurred seven years after Hinckley's, and concluded after the family he visits in the film had returned home. The Gates role is portrayed by Joseph Skousen.
