= Jessica Bejarano =

American conductor

Maestra Jessica Bejarano
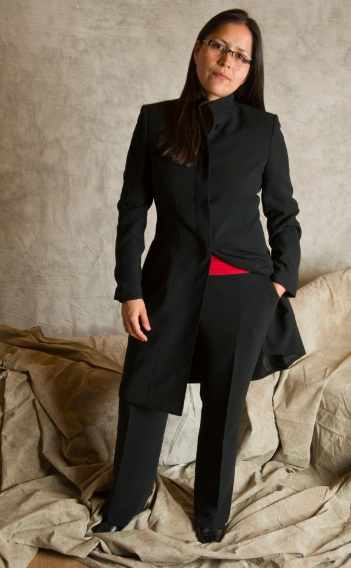
- Education: UC Davis; University of Wyoming; Casper College; Bell Gardens High School
- Occupations: Conductor and music director
- Organization: San Francisco Philharmonic

Jessica Bejarano is the founder and conductor of the San Francisco Philharmonic.

Bejarano was featured on NBC's The Today Show with Natalie Morales as the “Woman Breaking Barriers as a Trailblazing Symphony Conductor.” She has been featured on PBS News Hour Weekend. Bejarano was also named as One of 10 artists to Watch in KQED Arts’ Bay Brilliant Top 10 Artists of 2018.

== Early life and education ==
Bejarano grew up in Bell Gardens, southeast of Los Angeles, California, raised by a single mother. When Bejarano's older brother Rigoberto brought his trumpet home in middle school, Bejarano would sneak into the case and play the instrument. She taught herself to play for a year before joining her middle school band. She continued in marching bands and later auditioned for the Troopers, a prestigious competitive drum and bugle corp. In return for a two-summer commitment to the corp, the Troopers would help Bejarano get a full scholarship to Casper College in Wyoming,

"I was working on my degree in music education, and I did residencies where I had to go into a middle school or high school, just to get the hands-on experience of working with children. And one of my mentors looked at me and said, ‘How are you going to stand in front of children, looking the way you do?’ At that point, aside from having tattoos, I had 13 piercings on my face,” she chuckles. “I said, ‘it doesn’t matter what I look like, I know the material, and I know how to educate, motivate, and inspire music in those kids.’

Bejarano transferred with a full scholarship to University of Wyoming in Laramie to complete her BA in music education. Classical music was not a part of her childhood in the low-income minority community Bejarano grew up in. Bejarano did not discover classical music until her first year in college. In order to fulfil the requirements of her trumpet music scholarship, Bejarano had to play in a few ensembles. When she did, she said "it was like that music was already ingrained in [her] body, but it just needed to be activated."

Bejarano's initial degrees were in music education as she had aspired to be a music educator at a prestigious high school or college. When she decided to change her focus to conducting, she said she probably would have been dissuaded if she had realized how complicated that is for women and how much more complicated that would be for a woman with her background and ethnicity. She was told many times that she would "never be a successful conductor in the U.S. due to her looks and background."

After graduating from University of California, Davis, Bejarano was accepted into a doctoral program in orchestral conducting at University of South Carolina. She was also offered a $2000 per year position as assistant conductor of the Peninsula Symphony in Los Altos, California. Bejarano chose to conduct instead of pursuing her doctorate.

== Career ==
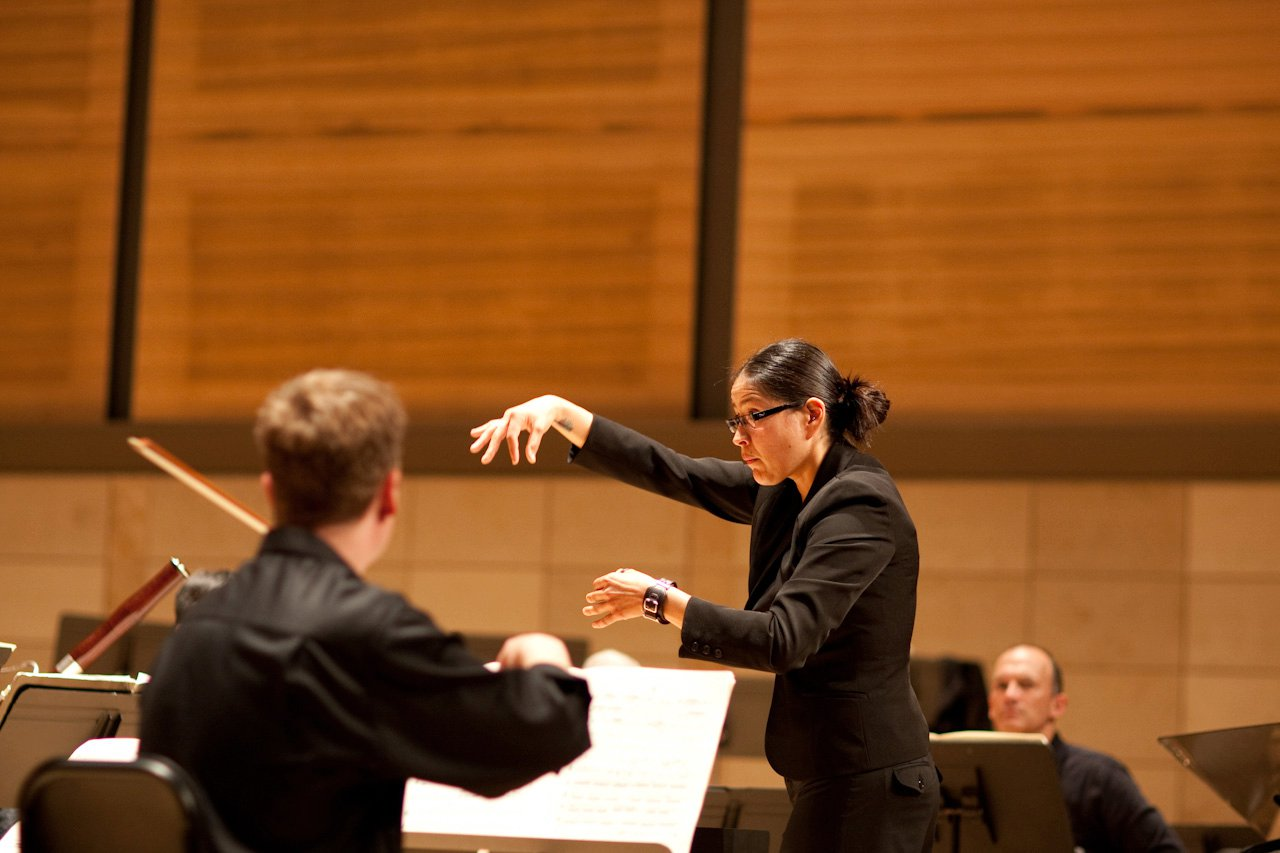
Bejarano conducting chamber orchestra

Bejarano started her conducting career as an assistant conductor of the Peninsula Symphony. Later she became the principal conductor of the San Francisco Civic Symphony, the oldest symphony west of the Mississippi. Bejarano is also assistant conductor of Opera Parallele in San Francisco, California, and a guest conductor for the Bay Area Rainbow Symphony.

She has been a guest conductor in Russia, Bulgaria, Italy, Romania, Spain, Venezuela, Finland and the Czech Republic, and with orchestras in the U.S. from Santa Cruz to Baltimore. She is a regular guest conductor with Camerata Antonio Soler Orchestra in San Lorenzo de el Escorial, Spain.

Bejarano was the first woman to conduct L.A.'s American Youth Symphony in 2019.

In 2019, Bejarano founded the San Francisco Philharmonic, an 80 piece symphony created to "reflect the glorious diversity of the Bay Area [and to be] accessible to all."
