= Wintergreen Summer Music Festival and Academy =

Music event in Virginia

The Wintergreen Music Festival (WMF) is a four-week-long event held at Wintergreen Resort in Virginia's Blue Ridge Mountains. The event has been held yearly since 1995. It is produced by its parent organization, Wintergreen Music (Wintergreen Performing Arts, Inc.). WMF includes performances by the Wintergreen Festival Orchestra, which performs public concerts each Saturday and Sunday of the four weeks in the Dunlop Pavilion (formerly the John D. Evans Center.)

== Programming and Venues ==
Typically held during the month of July, WMF presents daily concerts, coffee talks, "concert wine tastings" and live musical nature hikes at Wintergreen Resort (offering lodging, spa services, racquet sports, and golf at the Resort). WMF includes intimate concerts in partner wineries, breweries and in private Wintergreen homes. Festival Artists travel from across the county to perform with the Festival and the Wintergreen Festival Orchestra along with guest artists and guest conductors. Multi-genre music is also presented, including Bluegrass, Jazz, Motown, rock, American folk, tango, and more.

=== Notable Performers ===
WMF has been host to performers from around the world, including violinists Rachel Barton Pine, Robert McDuffie and James Buswell, William Preucil, David Kim, and Roger Frisch; cellists Janos Starker, Julie Albers, Wendy Warner, and Zuill Bailey; pianist Norman Kreiger, Orion Weiss, Christopher O'Riley, Inna Faliks, Sean Chen; double bassist Joseph Conyers; conductors Peter Oundjian, Mei-Ann Chen, Carl St. Clair, Victor Yampolsky, Josep Caballé Domenech, Andrew Litton, Sameer Patel, Nicholas Hersh, Andrew Grams, Michelle Merrill, John Morris Russell, Mark Russell Smith, Stephen Mulligan, Daniel Hege, Ankush Kumar Bahl;soprano Arianna Zukerman; mezzo-soprano Heather Johnson; composers Daron Hagen, Gilda Lyons,Eric Ewazen, Lawrence Dillon, Michael White, Ricardo Lorenz, and Ken Steen.

== Education and Community Initiatives ==
In 2022, WM launched the LEAD Cooperative (Learn, Explore, Adapt, Diversify), coinciding with the last two weeks of the Festival. LEAD offers a cross-disciplinary curriculum based on the needs of today’s pre-professional students combined with relevant industry topics and pedagogical practices. LEAD addresses needs not currently met in educational institutions, offers limited space to maximize time for study and public performance alongside faculty and includes the creation of a professional portfolio. In this leadership training program, chamber music selection routinely features historically-excluded composers, standard repertoire, and new requests. Designed with both quality and accessibility in mind, WM offers LEAD through a tuition-free model to all accepted students. Post-program student surveys indicated a 100% satisfaction rate in 2023. Of the respondents, all but one student shared that they could not have afforded to attend if tuition was not free. Programs include instrumental studies, voice, composition, collaborative piano, conducting & arts administration. Wintergreen Music partners with Nelson County Public Schools to administer VCA grant funds with additional contracting and logistical coordination to supplement arts programs. Programs supported include on and off-campus performances, workshops and field trips to local and state-wide performing arts groups. Wintergreen Music typically offers year-round events in addition to the annual Wintergreen Music Festival. Recent years included Wintergreen Wonderland at the Rockfish Valley Community Center and Sounds of Spring – held at Veritas winery and The Farmhouse at Veritas.

The former Wintergreen Summer Music Academy (1997-2020) was a chamber music intensive program for advanced high school through doctoral students who play violin, viola, and cello. WSMA also produced the Lotte Lehmann Vocal Masterclasses, the Composition Academy, and the Quartet Fellowship Program.

Historically, WMF had been home to the American Sinfonietta (1997-1998), the Richmond Symphony (1999), and now imports orchestral musicians and university professors from around the country (2000–present). In recent years, the Festival has included guest performers of various styles including rock, jazz, pop and bluegrass in addition to masterclasses and educational seminars.

== Leadership ==
Artistic Leadership: Dr. Erin Freeman, Artistic Director (2014–present) Dr. Larry Alan Smith, Artistic and Executive Director (2006-2014) David Wiley, Artistic Director (1999-2006) Executive Leadership: Julianne Akins Smith, Executive Director (2016-present); Peter Winik, President (2018-2022); Victoria Sabin, President (2023-present).
