= Julie R. Ingelfinger =

American pediatric nephrologist

- Born: New York City
- Spouse(s): Joseph Abbott Ingelfinger (m. 1966) Peter W. McDavitt
- Relatives: Eugenia Zukerman (sister)

Academic background
- Education: A.B. Radcliffe College; University of Hartford Hartt School; MD, Albert Einstein College of Medicine

Julie Alice Rich Ingelfinger is an American pediatric nephrologist. She is a deputy editor for the New England Journal of Medicine, professor of pediatrics at Harvard Medical School, and consulting pediatric nephrologist at Massachusetts General Hospital.

== Early life and education ==
Ingelfinger was born in New York City to parents Stanley Robert and Shirley Cohen Rich. Her mother was the first female student in the Graduate Engineering School of City College of New York. She also grew up alongside her flutist sister Eugenia Zukerman. Rich Ingelfinger graduated from the University of Hartford Hartt School, where she studied piano under Raymond Hanson, and magna cum laude from Radcliffe College. While attending Albert Einstein College of Medicine, she married Joseph Abbott Ingelfinger in 1966. Upon achieving her medical degree, Ingelfinger completed her pediatric residency and nephrology fellowship at St. Louis Children's Hospital through the Washington University School of Medicine.

== Career ==
Upon completing her medical training, Ingelfinger began working at MassGeneral Hospital for Children at Massachusetts General Hospital in 1973 and accepted a faculty position at Harvard Medical School. She was appointed Chief of Pediatric Nephrology in 1989 and served one term as president of the American Society of Pediatric Nephrology.

In 1997, Ingelfinger and her sister co-authored a book titled Coping With Prednisone, a drug her sister took when she was suffering from eosinophilic pneumonitis. They chose to write the book after finding there was a lack of information available to patients undergoing prednisone treatment. In 2001 Ingelfinger was named a deputy editor for the New England Journal of Medicine. In 2009, she was the recipient of the Barnett Award, the American Academy of Pediatrics’ highest honor in nephrology. She was also recognized with the 2012 American Society of Pediatric Nephrology’s Founder’s Award in honor of her "unique and lasting contribution to the field of pediatric nephrology."

As a senior consultant in Pediatric Nephrology at MassGeneral Hospital for Children, Ingelfinger was honored by the National Kidney Foundation for her "years of dedication to the care and treatment of adults and children living with kidney disease." She also received the 2018 Alumni Association Lifetime Achievement Award from her alma mater Albert Einstein College of Medicine.
