= Valley Symphony Orchestra (Los Angeles) =

Orchestra in Los Angeles

The Valley Symphony Orchestra in Los Angeles, California, United States, is a community college symphonic orchestra that is associated with Los Angeles Valley College (LAVC). The music director of the orchestra is Michael H. Arshagouni, who assumed the helm of the orchestra for the 2009/10 season. Arshagouni is also the chair of the LAVC Department of Music.

== History and operations ==
The orchestra was founded in 1992 by Robert Chauls, a professor at LAVC, to be a community orchestra of professionals and students. The regular performance venue is the main stage theatre at LAVC.

Los Angeles Philharmonic cellist Stephen Custer and violinist Lawrence Sonderling have been regular guest performers.

Lynn Angebranndt of the Kadima String Quartet is the principal cellist. The past concertmaster was Rochelle Abramson, a first violinist with the Los Angeles Philharmonic.

On October 13, 2007, guest pianist Neil Galanter played the symphony's first concert of the 2007–2008 season.

=== Repertoire ===
The VSO's 2009/10 season included the following repertoire:

- Beethoven – Symphony No. 5 in C minor, Op. 67 (1st movement)
- Britten – Simple Symphony
- Copland – Appalachian Spring: Ballet for Martha (original version for 13 instruments)
- Elgar – Introduction and Allegro for Strings, Op. 47 (Kadima String Quartet – soloists)
- Fiala – Concertante in B-flat for Clarinet and English Horn (Julia Heinen, clarinet; Richard Kravchak, English horn)
- Handel – Concerto a due cori No. 2 in F, HWV 333
- Haydn – Symphony No. 94 "Surprise" (2nd movement)
- Haydn – The Creation: Part 1
- Holst – St. Paul's Suite, Op. 29, No. 2
- Jenkins – Palladio: Concerto Grosso for String Orchestra
- Mendelssohn – Piano Concerto No. 1 in G minor, Op. 25 (W. Terrence Spiller, piano)
- Mozart – Don Giovanni: Overture
- Mozart – Piano Concerto No. 24 in C minor, K. 491 (3rd movement; Liya Melikyan, piano)
- Mozart – Symphony No. 35 in D, K. 385 "Haffner"
- Mysliveček – Artaserse – selections (U.S. premiere)
- Rossini – La gazza ladra: Overture
- Smetana – Má vlast – "Vltava" (The Moldau)
- Vaughan Williams – Fantasia on Greensleeves
- Warlock – Capriol Suite for string orchestra

== See also ==
- List of symphony orchestras in the United States
- Music of Los Angeles
