= North Shore Philharmonic Orchestra =

The North Shore Philharmonic Orchestra was originally formed in 1946 as the Lynn Symphony Orchestra by a group of 15 North Shore musicians. The orchestra assumed the name North Shore Philharmonic Orchestra in the fall of 1947, and commenced a musical legacy which celebrated its Sixtieth Anniversary in 2007.

The Orchestra played its first concert in 1947 under founding conductor Rolland Tapley. The orchestra has performed continuously since then under just three Music Directors: Mr. Tapley, a Boston Symphony Orchestra violinist, led the orchestra from 1947 to 1972. He handed the baton to his Boston Symphony Orchestra colleague Max Hobart in 1973, who led the orchestra until 1996. Following two seasons of guest conductors, current music director Robert Lehmann assumed the orchestra's leadership.

Over the years the NSPO has been the stage for soloists such as violinists Joseph Silverstein, Dana and Yuri Mazurkevich, Ronan and Gabe Lefkowitz and Charles Dimmick. The North Shore Philharmonic Orchestra has participated in local notable events, having played concerts for the 350th Commemoration of the Salem Witch Trials, the Bicentennial Celebration of the birth of George Peabody, and the 100th Anniversary of Revere Beach.

The North Shore Philharmonic Orchestra, administered by an all-volunteer board of directors, comprises freelance musicians from throughout Greater Boston and the north shore and welcomes interested musicians and volunteers.
