= Stilian Kirov =

Orchestra conductor

- Born: January 24, 1984 (age 42); Sofia, Bulgaria
- Education: Juilliard School; École Normale de Musique de Paris
- Occupation: Orchestra conductor

Stilian Kirov (born January 24, 1984) is a conductor and music director of the Illinois Philharmonic Orchestra, Symphony in C (orchestra) in New Jersey, and the Bakersfield Symphony Orchestra in California. He was previously associate conductor for the Seattle Symphony and Memphis Symphony.

== Education ==
Kirov was born on January 24, 1984, in Sofia, Bulgaria.

Kirov is a graduate of the Juilliard School in orchestral conducting, where he was a student of James DePreist, and holds a master's degree in conducting from the École Normale de Musique de Paris.

== Engagements ==
Engagement highlights for Kirov include guest performances with the symphonies of Chautauqua, Kalamazoo, South Bend, and West Virginia, among others. He also appeared regularly as guest conductor with the Pacific Northwest Ballet in Seattle.

Worldwide, he has appeared with the Minas Gerais Philharmonic, Leopolis Chamber Orchestra/Ukraine, Orchestra of Colors/Athens, Orchestre Colonne/Paris, Sofia Philharmonic, State Hermitage Orchestra/St. Petersburg, Thüringen Philharmonic Orchestra, the Zagreb Philharmonic, the Musical Olympus International Festival in St. Petersburg, and the Victoria Symphony/British Columbia.

During the 2013-14 season, Kirov was engaged as an assistant conductor to Bernard Haitink with the Chicago Symphony Orchestra. He was also engaged as a cover conductor for Stéphane Denève, the late Rafael Frühbeck de Burgos, and Christoph von Dohnáyi.

In 2017, Kirov was appointed Music Director for the Illinois Philharmonic Orchestra.

== Awards ==
Kirov was awarded the 2018 Career Assistance Award of the Solti Foundation U.S. It is the third time he has received the award of the foundation. In addition, he was awarded first prize in the 2017 "Debut Berlin" Concert Competition.
