= California Philharmonic Orchestra =

Orchestra in Los Angeles, 1996 to 2022

California Philharmonic
- philharmonic orchestra
- Short name: CalPhil
- Founded: 1996 (30 years ago)
- Disbanded: 2022 (4 years ago)
- Location: Los Angeles, California, U.S.
- Concert hall: Santa Anita Park; Walt Disney Concert Hall
- Music director: Victor Vener

The California Philharmonic Orchestra, often abbreviated as Cal Phil, was an orchestra, based in Los Angeles, California, United States.

== History and operations ==
The orchestra performed twenty years of outdoor summer concerts between 1996 and 2016, but then discontinued the practice.

Beginning in 2011, the orchestra performed at the Santa Anita Racetrack, in Arcadia, California, under the musical directorship of Victor Vener, the organization's founder.

Eventually, the California Philharmonic with the California Philharmonic Chorale – popularly known as the Cal Phil Chorale – made Walt Disney Concert Hall their home for their regular summer concerts.

Vener died on December 31, 2023, in Pasadena, California.

== See also ==
- Culture of Los Angeles
- List of orchestras in the United States
