= OK Mozart Festival =

OK Mozart is an annual Classical music festival held each June in Bartlesville, Oklahoma, except 2020 when it was rescheduled for September. Considered Oklahoma's Premiere Music Festival, OK MOZART brings the highest quality professional musical and cultural experiences to the state of Oklahoma and the middle United States. The festival is a multi-day, multi-location event with professional orchestra musicians, concert artists and musical performances of artistic excellence for an event with international significance.

== Notable featured artists ==
The first festival was held in 1985, and throughout its 40 years has featured World Renowned Orchestra Players and Conductors and Grammy Award Winning Artists. Some of the past performers include:

- Ransom Wilson
- Itzhak Perlman
- Robin Sutherland
- Joshua Bell
- The Canadian Brass
- Edgar Meyer
- Andre Watts
- Erica Kiesewetter
- Nadja Salerno-Sonnenberg
- Bela Fleck
- Gustav Meier
- Carolina Chocolate Drops
- Esperanza Spalding
- Jon Kimura Parker
- Miro Quartet
