= Long Bay Symphony Orchestra =

American orchestra

The Long Bay Symphony Orchestra is an American orchestra located in Myrtle Beach, South Carolina. It was founded by Dr. Diana Swanner-Scroggins in 1988. It is named after the long bay that stretches sixty miles along the Grand Strand region of the North and South Carolina coasts. A professional orchestra, the symphony has both a full orchestra and a chamber orchestra series each year. In addition, the symphony has played with many notable artists and groups.

Dr. Won-Mo Kim served as the first music director and conductor for the symphony. Dr. Charles Jones Evans has served in that position since 1996.

The symphony is also active in educational programming and the training of tomorrow's musical artists, and operates the Long Bay Symphony's youth orchestra. Jessica B. Miller is the current manager of the youth orchestra.
