= Bakersfield Symphony Orchestra =

American orchestra

Bakersfield Symphony Orchestra (MSO)
- Orchestra
- Founded: 1932
- Location: Bakersfield, United States
- Concert hall: Mechanics Bank Theater and Convention Center
- Music director: Stilian Kirov
- Website: www.bsonow.org

The Bakersfield Symphony Orchestra (BSO) is an American orchestra based in Bakersfield, California. Founded in 1932, BSO plays its concerts at the Mechanics Bank Theater and Convention Center. On October 8, 2022, BSO opened its 91st season.

Stilian Kirov has been the music director of the BSO since 2015 and is currently contracted through 2026.
