= Sault Symphony Orchestra =

The Sault Symphony Orchestra (SSO) is a Canadian/American orchestra headquartered in Sault Ste. Marie, Ontario, Canada. It is a registered not-for-profit charitable organization, both in Canada and the United States. The orchestra is unique in that it consists mostly of volunteer community musicians from both the Twin Saults (Ontario and Michigan).

== History ==
The Sault Symphony Orchestra first was formed in 1956 as the Sault Symphonette. With support from Algoma Steel, the Symphonette gave live concerts and radio broadcasts. In 1969, the group was renamed the Sault Symphony.

In the mid-1970s, several actions were taken by the Orchestra to reflect change in its demographics and growth. It was renamed the Sault Ste. Marie International Association, to reflect the increasing presence of players from both sides of the border. At a later date, the official name of the organization was changed to Sault Symphony Association. A partnership with the Sudbury Symphony was developed. There were several joint concerts and the semi-regular participation of musicians from one orchestra to the other.

During the 1980s, the Sault Symphony sponsored a string quartet with support from the Ontario Arts Council and Algoma Steel Corporation. In 1989, the Sault Symphony Association and the Conservatory at Algoma University established a CORE musicians program, with funding from the Ontario Arts Council. One of these CORE musicians continue to play for the Sault Symphony.

In June 2022, the SSO celebrated its 50th anniversary; as of 2024, the symphony is still active in providing performances as well as educational and community outreach.

== Governance ==
The Board of Directors of the Sault Ste. Marie Symphony Association governs the Sault Symphony Orchestra. The Board of Directors consists of volunteer community members from both Sault Ste. Marie, Ontario and Michigan.
