= Astoria Symphony =

American orchestra

Astoria Symphony Orchestra
- Orchestra
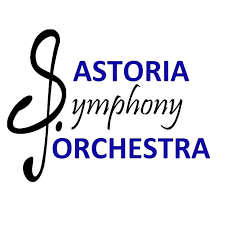
- Founded: 2002
- Location: Astoria, Queens, New York, U.S.
- Principal conductor: Silas Nathaniel Huff

The Astoria Symphony Orchestra is an orchestra of professional musicians based in Astoria, Queens, in New York City. It performs at least six programs annually and is the only semi-professional orchestra that regularly serves western Queens.

The orchestra was founded by conductor Silas Nathaniel Huff in 2002, and performed fifteen concerts in its inaugural season. The Astoria Symphony's first performance in September 2003, under Huff's baton, included Felix Mendelssohn's The Hebrides, Mozart's Flute Concerto No. 1, and Haydn's Symphony No. 103 ("Drumroll"). Since then, the orchestra has performed a wide range of repertoire, including Vivaldi's Gloria; Schubert's Unfinished Symphony; Debussy's Prelude to the Afternoon of a Faun (reduced orchestration); Brahms's A German Requiem; Beethoven's Choral Fantasy, Symphonies No. 8 and 9, Piano Concertos 3 and 5, and Egmont Overture; Stravinsky's The Firebird; Ives's The Unanswered Question; Lukas Foss's Elegy for Anne Frank; and many more, including a number of world premieres. These performances have taken place in LaGuardia Performing Arts Center (LaGuardia Community College, Long Island City), Symphony Space (Upper West Side), Riverside Church, Central Park's Naumburg Bandshell, and the Manhattan Jewish Community Center, among others.

The Astoria Symphony is the flagship ensemble of the Astoria Music Society, which also includes the Lost Dog New Music Ensemble.
