= Noam Aviel =

Israeli orchestral conductor

- Origin: Israel
- Occupation: Conductor
- Member of: Symphony In C

Noam Aviel is an Israeli orchestral conductor working in the United States. Since 2023, Aviel has been the Music Director of Symphony in C based in Camden, New Jersey.

== Early life and education ==
Born in Israel, Aviel began studying music as a teenager, playing jazz bass.

Aviel attended Tel Aviv University, Buchmann-Mehta School of Music, focusing on Voice Performance and Orchestral Conducting. Aviel was inspired by watching Zubin Mehta conducting "Mahler’s Third" at the Israel Philharmonic Orchestra. Aviel transferred to Illinois State University to study Orchestral Conducting in 2014. Aviel was Assistant Director of Orchestras at Illinois State University under Dr. Glenn Block, while studying for her Masters of Music in Orchestral Conducting, which she received in 2016.

In addition to Block, Aviel has cited Yoav Talmi, Xi-An Xu, Vag Papian, Johannes Schlaefli, Christoph Rehli, Enrique García Asensio, and Ilona Meskó. as her teachers.

== Career ==
In 2017, Aviel served as assistant and then associate conductor of the San Antonio Symphony.

In 2023, was named Music Director of New Jersey's Symphony in C.

Aviel has Guest Conducted at Knoxville Symphony Orchestra, Louisiana Philharmonic Orchestra, the Dortmunder Philharmoniker in Germany, Iceland's Symphony Orchestra, Norrköping Symphony Orchestra and Jönköpings Sinfonietta in Sweden, KwaZulu Natal Philharmonic and Johannesburg Philharmonic Orchestra in South Africa, and Israel Sinfonietta Beer Sheva.

== Personal ==
Aviel is married to Anat Gornshtein.
