= Lake Murray Symphony Orchestra =

American symphony orchestra

- Symphony orchestra
- Lake Murray Symphony Orchestra, May 2012
- Founded: 2004
- Location: Columbia, South Carolina
- Music director: Dr. Charles Patterson
- Website: lmso.org

The Lake Murray Symphony Orchestra (LMSO) is an American symphony orchestra based in Columbia, South Carolina.

Lake Murray Symphony Orchestra is a 501 (c)(3) non-profit organization and is composed of volunteer musicians. The orchestra's concert season begins on July 1 and ends on June 30 in the following year.

== History ==
The idea for Lake Murray Symphony Orchestra began in 2001 when a small group of musicians performed with the Lexington County Choral Society. Several players in that group saw the potential for a larger ensemble and founded a steering committee. Headed by artistic director Dr. Einar Anderson, the committee successfully incorporated the orchestra, recruited additional musicians, obtained non-profit status, held a fund raising event, and organized LMSO's premiere concert, which was presented on March 28, 2004. The first board of directors was elected May 18, 2004.

== Concerts ==
In 2010, the symphony performed for the opening of the Midlands Technical College Harbison Theatre located in Irmo, South Carolina. Following that performance, the Harbison Theatre was selected to be the performance hall home for the symphony.

The symphony typically performs three Sunday Concerts during their concert season. Each season also provides the symphony opportunities to play at various community events in different locations. Beginning in 2012, for example, Lake Murray Symphony Orchestra began collaborating with Saluda Shoals Park to bring patriotic music to park attendees in celebration of Independence Day on July 4.

Typically held annually, symphony members hold a Gala Fundraiser Event, Wine and Waltzes (2010–2013), where the symphony performs dance music for guests. In lieu of the annual fundraiser, in 2014 the symphony celebrated its tenth anniversary season with a concert and wine & cheese reception for their regular patrons at The River Center in Saluda Shoals Park.

Beginning in the 2012–13 concert season, the Lake Murray Symphony orchestra launched its first annual Young Artist Competition. This event is a music competition for high school students living in Lexington or Richland counties in South Carolina. The competition provides cash prizes to the top three young performers, and the grand prize is an invitation to perform the solo work with the symphony.

With the exception of Wine & Waltzes Gala fundraiser event, and in keeping with the mission statement of the Lake Murray Symphony Orchestra, all concerts presented by the symphony are free to the public.

== Conductors ==
Artistic Directors

- Dr. Charles Patterson (2026–present)
- Dr. Einar W. Anderson (2004–2014)

Assistant Conductors

- Andy Gowan (2014–2025)
- W. Scott MacDonald (2014–??)
- Dr. Suzanna Pavlovsky (2012–2014)
- Kimberly Sullivan (2006–2011)

== Young Artist Competition - History of Winners ==
Year	Contestant	Instrument	Place
2014	Secaida Howell	Alto Saxophone	1st Place
2014	Kristen Klein	Flute	2nd Place
2014	Samuel Hay	French Horn	3rd Place
2013	Maximilian Witherell	Bassoon	1st Place
2013	Zachary Patton	Cello	2nd Place
2013	Mary Freeman	Flute	3rd Place
