= Northwest Symphony Orchestra (Burien) =

- Orchestra
- Founded: 1987
- Location: Burien, Washington
- Website: northwestsymphonyorchestra.org

The Northwest Symphony Orchestra (NWSO) is an American orchestra based in the Seattle suburb of Burien, Washington. It was founded in 1987. The NWSO have been recorded on three CDs on the KOCH, Albany, and Gale labels. The orchestra has been featured on National Public Radio and NBC's Today Show.
