= Johnstown Symphony Orchestra =

- Orchestra
- Founded: 1929
- Location: Johnstown, Pennsylvania
- Concert hall: Pasquerilla Performing Arts Center
- Principal conductor: James Blachly
- Website: www.johnstownsymphony.org

The Johnstown Symphony Orchestra (JSO) is a symphony orchestra based in Johnstown, Pennsylvania. The symphony was founded in January 1929, and conducts a program of six subscription concerts from October to May plus four special events, including an annual Symphony Gala. The orchestra performs primarily at the University of Pittsburgh at Johnstown's Pasquerilla Performing Arts Center. In 2016, James Blachly was named the 12th music director.

== Music directors ==
(1929–1932) Hans Roemer
(1932–1935) Silvio Landino
(1935–1944) Theodore Koerner
(1944–1951) Russell Gerhart
(1951–1955) Manfred Kuttner
(1955–1956) Donald Johanos
(1956–1958) David McNaughton
(1958–1961) Manfred Kuttner
(1961–1969) Phillip Spurgeon
(1969–1973) Michael Semanitzky
(1973–1983) Donald Barra
(1983–2015) Istvan Jaray
(2016–present) James Blachly

== See also ==
- List of symphony orchestras in the United States
