= Peninsula Symphony =

- Orchestra
- Founded: 1949
- Location: Los Altos, California
- Principal conductor: Mitchell Sardou Klein
- Website: peninsulasymphony.org

The Peninsula Symphony is an American symphony orchestra, based in the San Francisco Peninsula, California. The orchestra consists of over 90 community musicians. In 1995, the Peninsula Symphony was featured in a PBS broadcast.

Since its beginning, the symphony has performed four pairs of concerts in October, January, March, and May. It also performs two free concerts each year, an outdoor summer concert, and a spring family concert. The symphony also hosts competitions, presents awards for young artists, and organizes outreach programs in local schools, known as Bridges to Music. A Special Bridges to Music program for children with disabilities was started in 2016 by board member and principal second violinist Deborah Passanisi. Each school year, the program culminates in a concert for teachers and parents, with the young performers singing and accompanied by a guitarist.

Mitchell Sardou Klein has been music director and conductor of the Peninsula Symphony since 1985, and also directs the Peninsula Youth Orchestra. Samantha Burgess currently serves as the resident conductor for the 77th season.

History: The Peninsula Symphony was founded by Russian-born violinist/conductor Aaron Sten. In 1949, Aaron Sten became conductor of a small Redwood City group of musicians that he met while buying a house. Shortly after, a group of about 32 San Mateo musicians under the name The Peninsula Symphony disbanded and joined Aaron Sten's group. The resulting group of about 60 musicians formed an orchestra under the name Sequoia Symphony Orchestra and performed their first season. By the end of the second season, the name had changed to the Peninsula Symphony and in 1951, the non-profit Peninsula Symphony Association was incorporated. In that very first year, many features were established which were to become trademarks of the Peninsula Symphony: four concerts in October, January, March, and May; a balanced musical program featuring first-class guest artists; an attractive concert program with informative notes; and strong support from the community. In 1951, under Vincent Guida, symphony clarinetist and business manager, the organization was incorporated as a non-profit association, and a formal board was chosen.

In 1952, Aaron Sten also founded the California Youth Symphony, and began the tradition of incorporating outstanding young musicians into Peninsula Symphony performances. In 1956, Board President Robert L. Clark was the driving force behind the creation of the Peninsula Symphony Auxiliary, a women's volunteer group, which was instrumental to the development of an audience base. With no office or executive director yet, volunteers played a crucial role in symphony operations. In 1985, the symphony opened an office with executive director to manage its growth .

By 1985, the time had come to open an office in San Mateo and hire a paid executive director. Coincidentally, this was also the last year of founding conductor Aaron Sten's leadership.

With the arrival of current conductor Mitchell Sardou Klein, the Peninsula Symphony grew from a grassroots ensemble to a polished 90-plus member orchestra of well-trained community musicians. Following Sten's tradition of nurturing young musicians, the Peninsula Youth Orchestra was established in the spring of 1997, with Mitchell Sardou Klein serving as the music director. The business office moved to Los Altos in 2001.

== Music directors ==
Mitchell Sardou Klein (1985–present), is the music director and conductor of the Peninsula Symphony and founding music director of the Peninsula Youth Orchestra (PYO). He regularly guest conducts orchestras in California, throughout the United States, and in Europe.

He made his debut with Symphony Silicon Valley in 2012. His other appearances as a guest conductor in California include the San José Symphony, Santa Rosa Symphony, the Inland Empire/Riverside Philharmonic, Ballet San Jose, the California Riverside Ballet and the Livermore-Amador Philharmonic. Concerts elsewhere have included his return to Europe to guest conduct the New Polish Philharmonic and the Suddettic Philharmonic, concert tours of England, France, Spain, Italy, Germany, Austria, Czech Republic, Hungary, Belgium, the Netherlands, Japan, Australia and New Zealand with PYO, numerous return engagements to the San Jose Symphony (the predecessor of Symphony Silicon Valley), and his return to the podium of the Santa Cruz County Symphony. Prior guest conducting appearances have included the Seattle Symphony, New Polish Philharmonic, Suddetic Philharmonic, Richmond Symphony, Eastern Philharmonic, Flagstaff Festival Symphony, Amarillo Symphony, Lexington Philharmonic, South Bend Symphony, and many others. Maestro Klein also has extensive experience in conducting ballet orchestras, including the Kansas City Ballet, Lone Star Ballet, Oakland Ballet, and Westport Ballet, as well as the Theater Ballet of San Francisco and les Ballets Trockadero de Monte Carlo.

Klein directed over a hundred concerts as associate conductor of the Kansas City Philharmonic (where he was also principal pops conductor and principal conductor of Starlight Theater, the philharmonic's summer home), and also served as music director of the Santa Cruz County Symphony.

Klein was born in New York City, into a musical family that included members of the Claremont String Quartet and Budapest String Quartet. He began cello studies at age four with his father, Irving Klein, founder of the Claremont String Quartet. His mother, Elaine Hartong Klein, danced with the Metropolitan Opera Ballet.

Since 1984, he has been director of the Irving M. Klein International String Competition.

Aaron Sten (1949–1985)

== Assistant conductors ==
The Peninsula Symphony maintains an ongoing assistant conductor position for up and coming conductors. These conductors are usually responsible for leading one piece per subscription concert, organizing and conducting the annual family concert, and serving as personnel manager for the orchestra.

- Samantha Burgess (2025–present)
- Nathaniel Berman, resident conductor (2022–2025)
- Hoh Chen (2018–2022)
- Chad Goodman (2016–2018)
- Nathaniel Berman (2012–2016)
- Jessica Bejarano (2008–2012)
- Geoffrey Gallegos (2003–2007)
- Thomas Shoebotham (2001–2003)
- Howard Rappaport (1999–2000)
- Sara Jobin (1997–1998)

== Youth competitions ==
The symphony also has a tradition of incorporating outstanding young musicians, such as the winners of the Irving M. Klein International String Competition, Marilyn Mindell Piano Competition, and Young Musicians' Competition into its performances. Some notable examples are Cathy Basrak, Frank Huang, Jennifer Koh, and Robert deMaine.

== Premieres ==
The symphony seeks out premieres and commissioned works. For its 50th season (May 1999), the Peninsula Symphony commissioned notable composer Melissa Hui to create Always, a work for taiko, chorus, and orchestra. The symphony has also commissioned Leaving Bai-Di by the Chinese-American composer Gang Situ in March 2008, and Lee Actor's Concerto for Piano and Orchestra in May 2013. In May 2018 the symphony performed the West Coast premiere of Garages of the Valley by Mason Bates.

== Guest artists ==
The Peninsula Symphony has a tradition of bringing guest soloists for concerts. Some notable examples are:

- John Kimura Parker, piano
- Soyeon Kate Lee, piano
- Renee Rapier, mezzo-soprano
- Joyce Yang, piano
- David Benoit, jazz piano
- Conrad Tao, piano
- Emi Ferguson, flute
- Garrick Ohlsson, piano
- Taylor Eigsti, jazz piano
- Dayna Stephens, saxophone
- John O'Conor, piano
- Quartet San Francisco, string quartet
- Elizabeth Pitcairn, violin
- Jon Nakamatsu, piano
- Angel Romero, classical guitar
- Larry Adler, harmonica
- Chris Brubeck, Dan Brubeck, jazz musicians
- Jiebing Chen, erhu
- Eroica Trio, piano trio
- Grant Johannesen, piano
- Jerome Lowenthal, piano
- Marni Nixon, soprano
- Christopher O'Riley, piano
- Richard Woodhams, oboe
- Nicanor Zabaleta, harp

== Performance venues ==
Centered in the San Francisco Peninsula, the Peninsula Symphony has performed at several local performance halls. These include the Heritage Theater, Flint Center, San Mateo Performing Arts Center, Fox Theatre (Redwood City, California), Bing Concert Hall, Spangenberg Theatre, and Stanford Memorial Church.
