= Avraham Aviel =

Polish writer

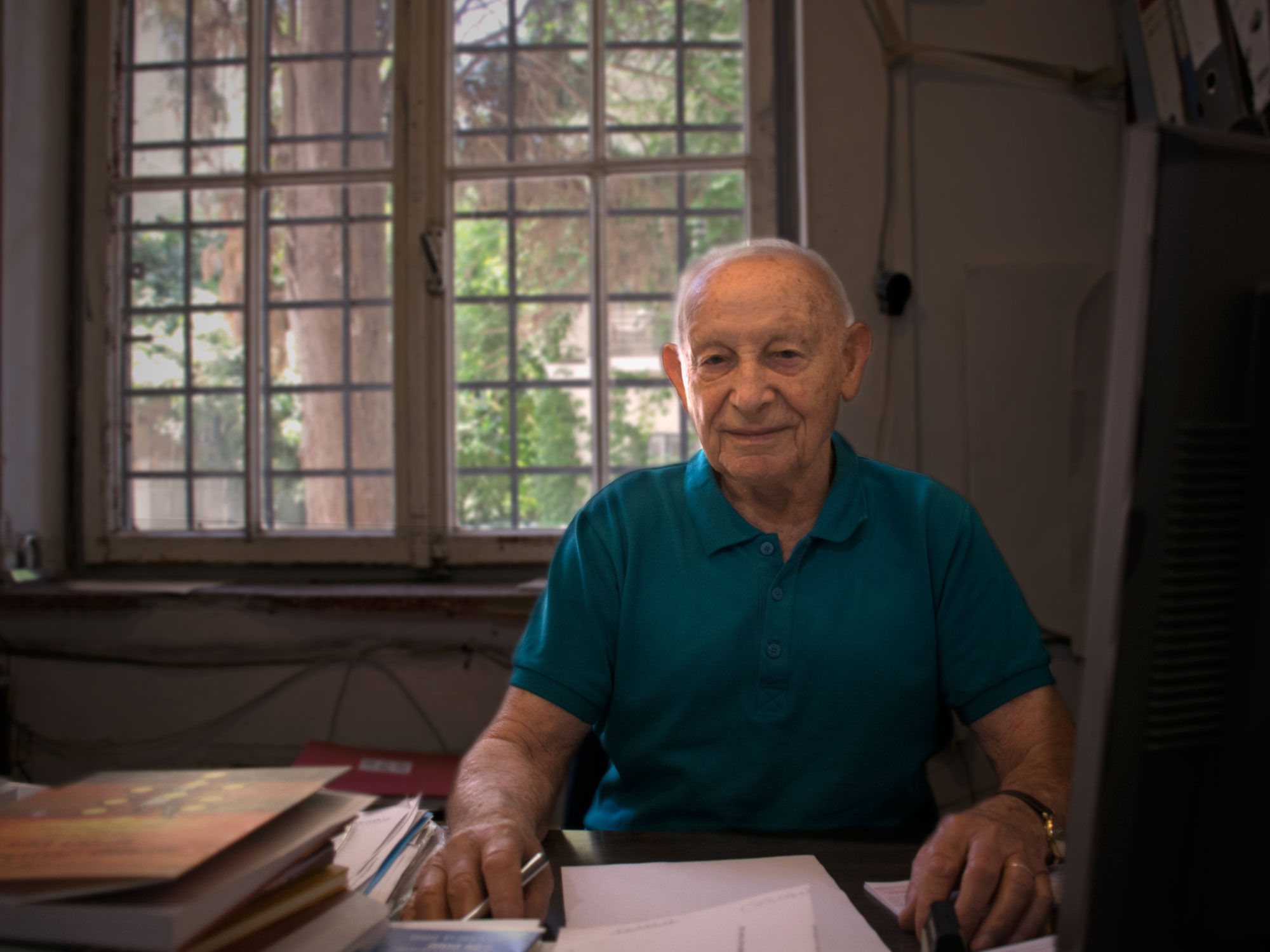
- Born: January 20, 1929 (age 97); Dowgalishok, Poland
- Occupations: Writer, book distribution executive
- Known for: Witness in the Eichmann trial

Aviel at the Eichmann trial in 1961

Avraham Aviel (Lipkunski) (born January 20, 1929) is a writer, director of a book distribution agency called Beith Alim, and a witness in the Eichmann trial.

== Biography ==
Aviel was born in Poland, in the Jewish village of Dowgalishok, to Moshe David and Sara Mina. He acquired Torah education at a small yeshiva in Radun, the town of Chafetz Chaim.

On May 10, 1942, at the age of 13, he witnessed the extermination of the Jews of Radon and the surrounding region in the death pits. He fled to the forests and fought against the Nazis until liberation. He lost his family in the Holocaust, during which he witnessed the murder of his brother Pinchas before his own eyes.

In 1945 he reached northern Italy and stayed at the Sciesopoli House, which became the home of Aliyat Hanoar institution of the Selvino children. He illegally sailed to Mandate Palestine on the ship "Katriel Yaffe", was captured by the British and exiled to Cyprus, finally entering Israel at the end of 1946. His first home in Israel was in Kibbutz Mishmar Hasharon. At the beginning of 1948, he enlisted in the Sixth Battalion of the Palmach and fought to open the way to Jerusalem.

At the Eichmann trial in 1961, he appeared as a witness for the prosecution and in his testimony recounted the extermination of the Jews of Radon as an example of the tragic story of Lithuanian Jews and the life of the partisans in the forests.

On Holocaust Martyrs' and Heroes' Remembrance Day 2011, he lit the sixth torch at the main ceremony held at Yad Vashem.

In 2018 he received a certificate of appreciation in honor of Nechama Pochatchevsky (Nefesh) from the Association of Hebrew Writers for his work in promoting Hebrew literature and poetry.

His story culminated the state ceremony "Every man has a name" that took place in the Knesset on Holocaust Remembrance Day 2018 in the presence of the Speaker of the Knesset, the Prime Minister and the President of the Supreme Court.

== Publications ==
- A village named Dowgalishok, Ministry of Defense Press, 1995.
  - The English edition was published in London: Avraham Aviel, A Village Named Dowgalishok: The Massacre at Radun and Eishishok, Vallentine Mitchell & Co Ltd. ISBN 0853035830
- Freedom and Loneliness, Tammuz Publishing - Writers' Association, 2000
  - The English edition has been published in Israel: Avraham Aviel, Freedom & Loneliness, KIP Ltd. ISBN 978-965-7238-36-3
- A Family from Two Twigs, living testimony, Beith Alim Publishing, 2017.
  - The English edition was published in Israel: Avraham Aviel, A Family from Two Twigs, Living Testimony, Beith Alim.
