= Symphony in C (orchestra) =

Professional training orchestra based in Camden, New Jersey

Symphony in C, formerly known as the Haddonfield Symphony, is a professional training orchestra based in Camden, New Jersey. Founded in 1952, Symphony in C's mission to train young professionals is similar to that of the Chicago Civic Orchestra and Miami's New World Symphony. The orchestra's home is The Gordon Theater on the campus of Rutgers University–Camden, and its current music director is Noam Aviel.

== History ==
The Haddonfield Symphony began as an amateur, volunteer ensemble for music lovers in 1952. The orchestra's debut performance was in January 1954 under music director Guido Terranova, and for decades brought classical music to its local communities. During the 1987–1988 season, the orchestra established a Professional Development Internship program and began providing training and performance opportunities to young professional musicians. The shift from an amateur to a semiprofessional ensemble caused controversy about the symphony's mission and in May 1991, the majority of amateur volunteers refused to put on a scheduled show, quit the Haddonfield Symphony and formed the Philharmonic of Southern New Jersey. Instead of recruiting new volunteers, the orchestra altered its mission and evolved into what it is today - a professional-caliber orchestra accountable for training some of the country's top music directors and musicians. The orchestra is made up of current and graduate students from the most reputable music schools in the country, including Philadelphia's Curtis Institute of Music and New York City's Juilliard School of Music. Many Symphony in C alumni now perform with the best orchestras in the world.

For years, the orchestra had no performance venue of its own, and traveled the region performing at high school auditoriums or whatever venues happened to be available. As part of a strategic plan, in the 2006–2007 season, the symphony began a new era and it moved its entire concert series to the Gordon Theater on the Rutgers University-Camden campus, in Camden, New Jersey. The orchestra's successful first performances in Camden ended their nomadic ways, and they settled into a permanent home there. This also led to the orchestra's name change from The Haddonfield Symphony to Symphony in C – the ‘C’ in its name representing its continued mission and new home: City, Culture, Community and Camden. In 2013, the symphony's administrative and box offices moved to Collingswood.

== Music directors and conductors ==
- Donald H. Razey (1954–1958)
- Arthur Cohn (1959–1992)
- Alan Gilbert (1992–1997)
- Daniel Hege (1997–2000)
- Rossen Milanov (2000–2015)
- Stilian Kirov (2015–2020)
- Noam Aviel (2023–present)

== Young Composers Competition ==
Established in 1996, Symphony in C's annual Young Composers Competition is open to composers under the age of 30 and has a growing reputation at music conservatories across the country. Each year's winning work is performed on one of the season's subscription concerts.

=== Young Composers Competition winners ===
- Michael Karmon (1996–1997)
- Amy Scurria (1997–1998)
- Paul Yeon Lee (1998–1999)
- Carter Pann (1999–2000)
- Dan Coleman (2000–2001)
- David Laganella (2001–2002)
- Anthony Cheung (2002–2003)
- John Kaefer (2003–2004)
- Martin Kennedy (2004–2005)
- Michael Djupstrom (2005–2006)
- Takuma Itoh (2006–2007)
- Zhou Tian (2007–2008)
- Clint Needham (2008–2009)
- Andrew McPherson (2009–2010)
- Michael Gilbertson (2010–2011)
- Roger Zare (2011–2012)
- Douglas Buchanan (2012–2013)
- Jules Pegram (2013–2014)
- Charles Peck (2014–2015)
- Patrick O'Malley (2015–2016)
- Scott Lee (2016–2017)
- Saad Haddad (2017–2018)
- Ryan Lindveit (2018–2019)

== Notable alumni ==
Symphony in C alumni hold, or have held positions with major orchestras in the United States and all over the world including: Baltimore Symphony Orchestra, Berlin Philharmonic, Cleveland Orchestra, Hong Kong Philharmonic Orchestra, Los Angeles Philharmonic, Metropolitan Opera Orchestra, Montreal Symphony Orchestra, National Symphony Orchestra, New York Philharmonic, Philadelphia Orchestra, San Francisco Symphony, and Seattle Symphony.
