= Beaufort Symphony Orchestra =

The Beaufort Symphony Orchestra is an orchestra centered in Beaufort, South Carolina. It was started in 1985 by Peter Dunden, the first conductor. Since 1992, it has been conducted by Frederick Devyatkin.

The orchestra typically performs four concerts per season: October, December, February/March and May/June concerts. The Beaufort Symphony Youth Orchestra (BSYO) also performs concerts four times per year. Join us.
