= Illinois Philharmonic Orchestra =

- Orchestra
- Short name: IPO
- Former name: Park Forest Orchestra
- Founded: 1954
- Location: Palos Heights, Illinois
- Concert hall: Ozinga Chapel, Trinity Christian College
- Principal conductor: Stilian Kirov
- Website: ipomusic.org

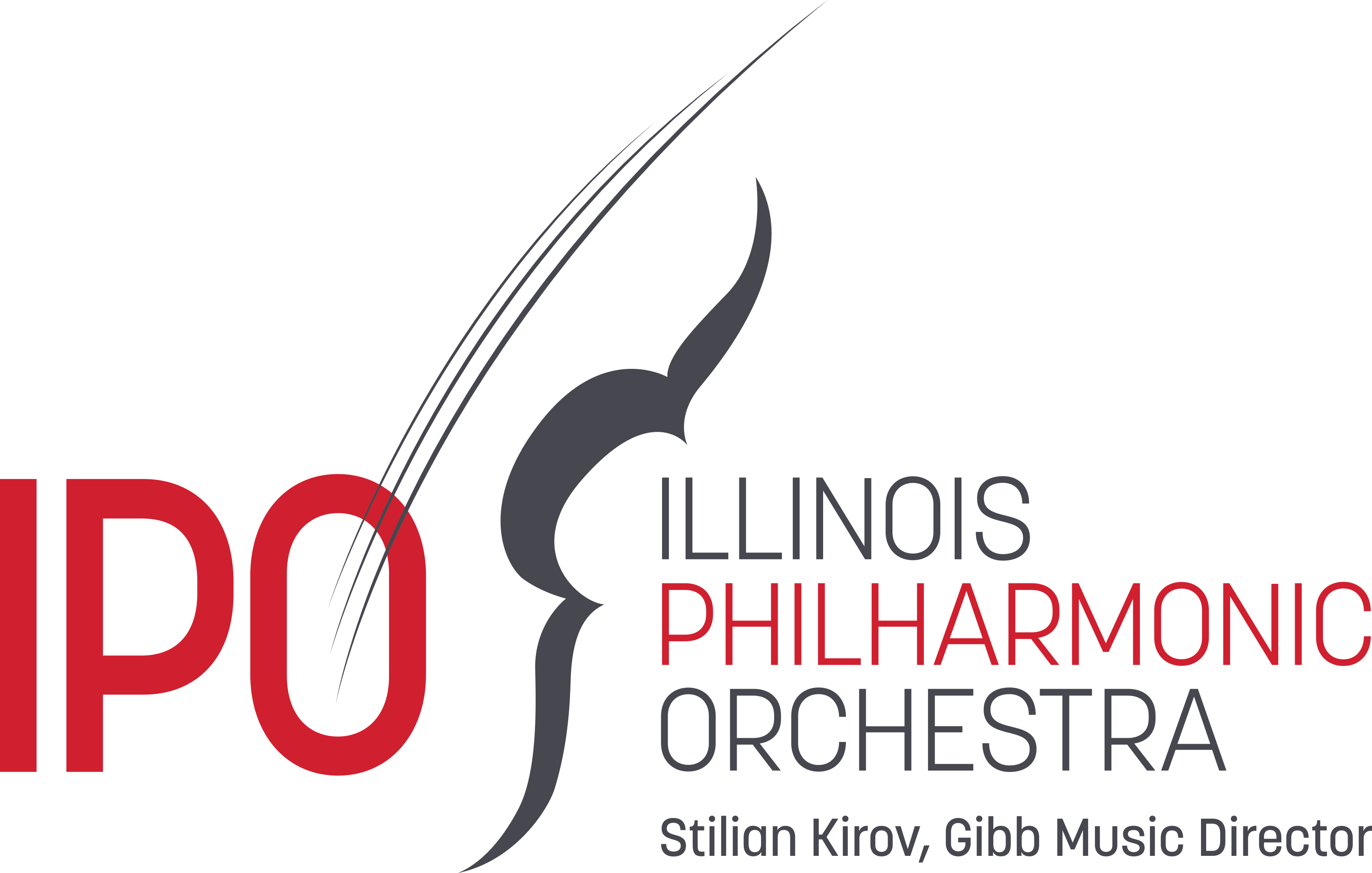

The Illinois Philharmonic Orchestra (IPO) is an orchestra in the Chicago area.

The Illinois Philharmonic Orchestra is a member of the League of American Orchestras and the Chicago Southland Convention & Visitors Bureau.

== History ==
The Park Forest Orchestra was founded by volunteer musicians in 1954.

In 1978, the orchestra re-formed into a professional chamber orchestra. In 1982, it was renamed to reflect its regional mission. Carmon DeLeone served as music director for 25 years beginning in 1986. DeLeone became conductor laureate in 2011. David Danzmayr was appointed music director from 2012 to 2016.

Stilian Kirov became the music director in 2017.
