= Kearney Symphony Orchestra =

Community Orchestra in Nebraska

The Kearney Symphony Orchestra is the full orchestra for Kearney, Nebraska, consisting of community musicians from Central Nebraska, music instructors from the University of Nebraska-Kearney, and students from the University of Nebraska-Kearney and area high schools. The orchestra performs four concerts each year. The current director of the orchestra is Erin Beave.
