= Beloit-Janesville Symphony Orchestra =

Symphony in wisconsin

Coordinates: 42°40′40.0″N 89°01′05.5″W

The Beloit Janesville Symphony Orchestra (briefly known as the Rock River Philharmonic from 2014 to 2016, but originally known as the Beloit Civic Symphony) is a semi-professional symphony orchestra based in Beloit and Janesville, Wisconsin, USA. Often referred to by its acronym, BJSO.

== History ==
Lewis Dalvit founded the Beloit Civic Symphony in 1953. In 1971, it became the Beloit Janesville Symphony Orchestra, performing concerts regularly in the two Rock County communities. The founder was succeeded by composer and Beloit College professor Crawford Gates, who served as music director from 1963 until 1999 when Robert Tomaro assumed the post of music director and conductor. Tomaro is a jazz guitarist and the Shogren Family Conductor and professor of music at Beloit College.

The Beloit Janesville Symphony Orchestra has attracted players from southern Wisconsin and northern Illinois as it has developed from a community orchestra of volunteers to a professional organization and non-profit corporation. The group performs a number concerts each year in Beloit and Janesville.

In 2014 the orchestra changed its name to the "Rock River Philharmonic" to reflect a shift in programming within the organization. In 2016, however, following a year-long performance hiatus, the original name was brought back.
