= Santa Cruz Symphony =

Symphony orchestra in Santa Cruz, California

The Santa Cruz Symphony is a symphonic orchestra in Santa Cruz, California, United States.

== History and operations ==
The symphony was established in 1958, and has been led by Daniel Stewart since 2013. The symphony performs at the Santa Cruz Civic Auditorium and the Mello Center for the Performing Arts in Watsonville, California.

== See also ==
- Arts and culture in Santa Cruz, California
- List of symphony orchestras in the United States
