= New Hampshire Philharmonic Orchestra =

American orchestra

- Orchestra
- Short name: NHPO, The Phil
- Former name: New Hampshire Philharmonic Society
- Founded: 1895; 131 years ago
- Location: Salem, New Hampshire
- Concert hall: Seifert Performing Arts Center
- Principal conductor: Mark Latham
- Music director: Mark Latham
- Website: www.nhphil.org

The New Hampshire Philharmonic Orchestra is an American orchestra based in Salem, New Hampshire. It was established in 1895 as the New Hampshire Philharmonic Society and became part of the Manchester Institute of Arts and Sciences in 1905. In 1958, it separated from the institute as an independent organization and adopted its current name at the end of 1959. Between 1992 and 2015, it was headquartered on Hanover Street in Manchester and primarily performed at the Palace Theatre. It briefly relocated to Derry for three years before moving to its current home at the Seifert Performing Arts Center in Salem, New Hampshire, in 2018.
