= Minot Symphony Orchestra =

The Minot Symphony Orchestra (MSO) is a program of Minot State University in Minot, North Dakota. Although a separate agency, the university's music department oversees the handling of the orchestra. Maestro Efrain Amaya, a professor of music at Minot State University, is the orchestra's conductor and has held the position since 2015.

The Minot Symphony Association supports the orchestra. The Minot Area Council of the Arts (MACA), a local non-profit agency that supports the arts, provides advertising, scheduling assistance, and other assistance to the orchestra. Minot is considered to be the smallest city in the United States that supports a full-sized symphony orchestra.

== History ==
The 2009–2010 season is the orchestra's 81st season.

== Venue ==
The MSO's regular performance hall is the Ann Nicole Nelson Hall at Minot State University.
