= Chippewa Valley Symphony =

- Orchestra
- Founded: 1975
- Location: Eau Claire, Wisconsin, United States
- Principal conductor: Nobuyoshi Yasuda
- Website: cvsymphony.org

The Chippewa Valley Symphony is an American orchestra based in Eau Claire, Wisconsin. The orchestra is conducted by Nobuyoshi Yasuda, who has been the music director since 1993.

The Chippewa Valley Symphony performs four season concerts each season, featuring guest artists, a young artist competition winner, and thematic classical music. The symphony also presents a pops concert in the fall and a free concert in February.
