= American Classical Orchestra =

American orchestra

The American Classical Orchestra is an orchestra dedicated to performing music from the 17th, 18th, and 19th centuries. As a period instrument ensemble, ACO's mission is to present the music as the composers might have heard it in their time using instruments and techniques from when the music was written. The American Classical Orchestra strives to present historically informed performances that add to the cultural landscape of NYC.

Founded by Artistic Director Thomas Crawford in 1984 as The Orchestra of the Old Fairfield Academy in Fairfield Connecticut, the American Classical Orchestra moved to New York City in 2005. Since moving to New York City, ACO has established itself as the leading period instrument ensemble in the city. The American Classical Orchestra's annual concert series, held largely at Alice Tully Hall in Lincoln Center, has garnered critical acclaim.

“The sublime original-instrument performance of J.S. Bach’s B-minor Mass by the American Classical Orchestra and Chorus last Saturday night at Lincoln Center’s Alice Tully Hall reminded me that a capacity for new revelations is one of the things that make great music great.” Jon Sobel, Classicalite November 18, 2014

“Mr. Crawford’s performance was quite simply splendid. “Der Tag” is populated by a variety of characters, two named (Jesus and John), the rest allegorical (Faith, the Archangel, the Blessed and the like). Mr. Crawford divided them among his 16 choristers, who were almost uniformly excellent, both individually and as a body.” James R. Oestreich, The New York Times October 14, 2015

“An Intimate Concert, With Original Instruments” Anthony Tommasini, The New York Times November 18, 2009

In 2001, the American Classical Orchestra was invited to perform at the Metropolitan Museum during an exhibition entitled Art and the Empire City: New York, 1825– 1861. The ACO presented two works premiered in New York during that time period. Additional highlights of ACO's 31 years include appearing as part of the Lincoln Center Great Performers Series, a sold-out 25th Anniversary performance of the Beethoven 9th Symphony at the Cathedral of St. John the Divine, and a staged a performance of Handel's opera Alceste as part of the American Classical Orchestra's survey of Handel's work during Handelfest in 2014.

The American Classical Orchestra has numerous recordings with renowned artists such as Malcolm Bilson and R.J. Kelley. Among the works recorded by the American Classical Orchestra are the complete wind concerti by Wolfgang Amadeus Mozart (featuring ACO's principal players as soloists), Mozart's Symphony No. 14, K.144 and Mozart's three Piano Concerti, K.107, with fortepianist Malcolm Bilson. In 2010, the American Classical Orchestra released a recording of Baroque oboe concerti with oboist Marc Schachman on the Centaur label.

The American Classical Orchestra is dedicated to the appreciation and understanding of classical music through educational programs. The ACO's educational mission is to spread historically informed performance practices to new generations and instill a love for the music of the Baroque, Classical and early Romantic periods. For this work, the American Classical Orchestra was awarded a National Endowment for the Arts grant and Early Music America prize. An unusual feature of ACO concerts is that Artistic Director Thomas Crawford gives the pre-concert lecture, giving the audience first-hand insights into the performance.
