= Max Hobart =

Max Hobart is an American conductor and violinist. He was music director emeritus of the Boston Civic Symphony. Mr. Hobart was also conductor and music director for the Wellesley Symphony Orchestra from 1993 to 2021.

Originally from Nebraska, Hobart grew up in Bell Gardens, California where he learned to play the violin. He later had private study with guitarist John Williams. Orchestras he has played with include the New Orleans Symphony, the National Symphony Orchestra, the Cleveland Orchestra and the Boston Symphony Orchestra.
