= Mississippi Symphony Orchestra =

The Mississippi Symphony Orchestra, from 1944 to 1989 the Jackson Symphony Orchestra, is the oldest Symphony Orchestra in the State of Mississippi. It performs most of its concerts at Thalia Mara Hall.
