= Valley Symphony Orchestra (McAllen, Texas) =

Valley Symphony Orchestra is an American symphony orchestra based in McAllen, Texas. In 2007, it was in its 55th season. It is sponsored by the South Texas Symphony Association. Peter Dabrowski is the musical director.
