= Central Wisconsin Symphony Orchestra =

Coordinates: 44°31′25.3″N 89°35′11.6″W

The Central Wisconsin Symphony Orchestra (CWSO) is located in Stevens Point, Wisconsin. The orchestra, comprising 80 musicians, provides four concert sets per concert season. The music director is Andres Moran, who is also the Professor of Horn at University of Wisconsin-Stevens Point.

== History ==
CWSO began in 1947 when it grew out of the music classes of Peter Michelsen, instructor at Central State Teachers' College (now University of Wisconsin-Stevens Point). The orchestra has gone through several name changes during its history. Originally known as Central State Symphony Orchestra, in 1953 it became the Stevens Point Symphony. In 1977 the name changed to Central Wisconsin Symphony Orchestra.

In January 2015, the CWSO moved its operations to the Smith Scarabocchio Art Museum, a venue of the Parks and Recreation Department of the city of Stevens Point. The museum is managed by the CWSO and the rotating exhibits are curated by a volunteer committee of professional artists.
