= Boston Civic Symphony =

American symphony orchestra

Boston Civic Symphony (BCS)
- Orchestra
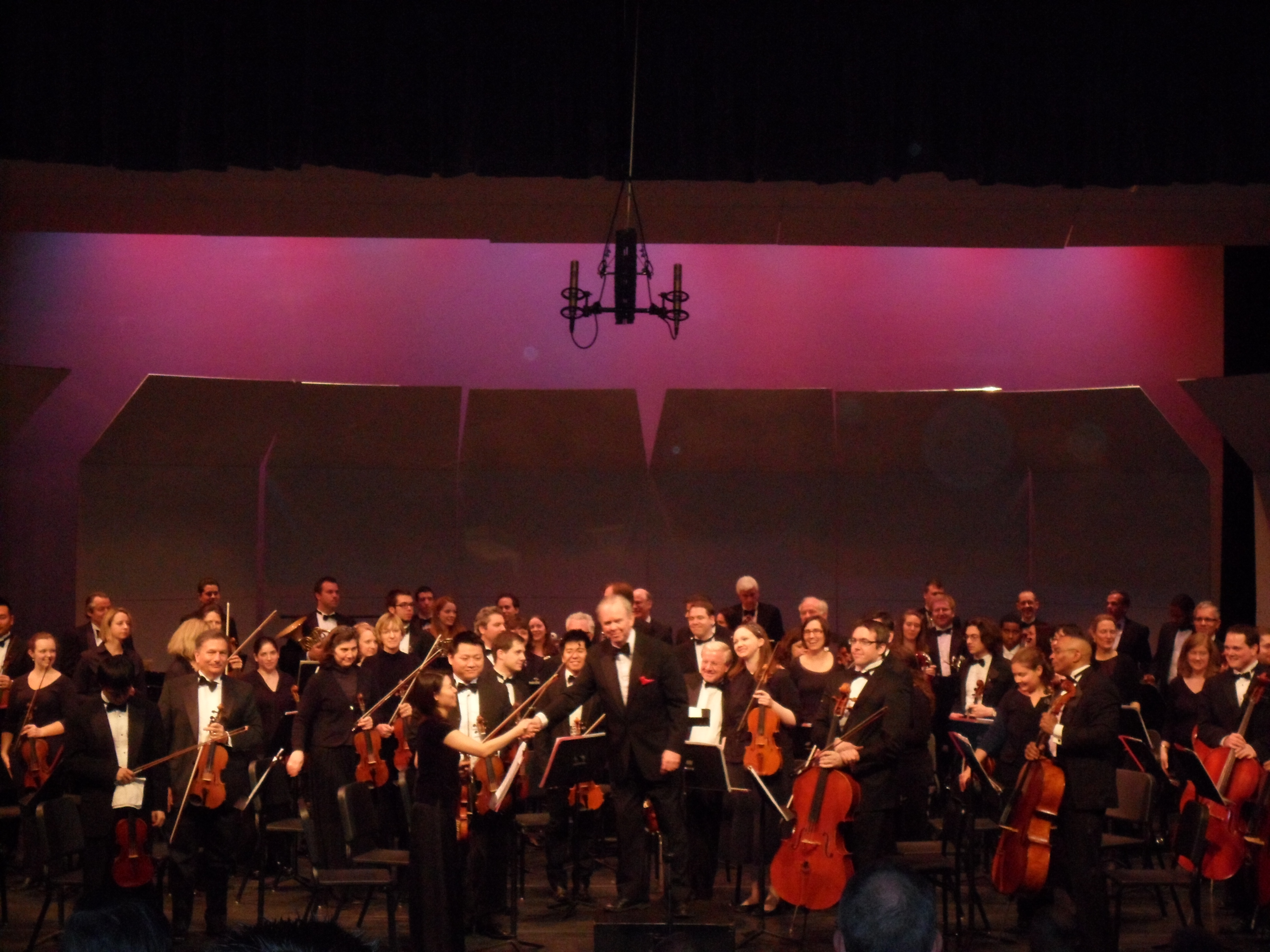
- Founded: 1924
- Principal conductor: Francisco Noya
- Website: www.bostoncivicsymphony.org

== History ==
The Boston Civic Symphony was founded in 1924 by Joseph Wagner. The group performs at the New England Conservatory in Jordan Hall on Gainsborough Street and at Eleanor Welch Casey Theatre of Regis College Fine Arts Center in Weston.

Performer, conductor, and teacher Max Hobart, who was previously with the Boston Symphony Orchestra for 27 years, has had an association with The Boston Civic Symphony since 1979.
