= Stephen Custer =

American musician (1943–2025)

Stephen Custer (October 18, 1943 – March 4, 2025) was an American cellist, who performed as a soloist and as a regular member of the Los Angeles Philharmonic, the premier orchestra of Southern California, in Los Angeles, California.

"He has performed solos with numerous orchestras and chamber music ensembles, including the Westlake (CA) Chamber Ensemble, Amici Musicae and Philharmonic ensembles and has given many recitals in California and in the eastern US. As a member of the Philharmonic, Stephen has played over 4000 concerts under four Music Directors at the Dorothy Chandler Pavilion, the new Walt Disney Concert Hall, Hollywood Bowl," and on tour.

Custer, who was from Newton, Massachusetts, studied at Juilliard School, did graduate work at Ohio University and earned a Doctor of Musical Arts in cello at Catholic University in Washington, D.C.

He became the principal cellist of the Syracuse Symphony Orchestra in Syracuse, New York, in 1971. Custer joined the Los Angeles Philharmonic in 1974.

Custer was an adjunct professor of cello at Pepperdine University.

Custer died on March 4, 2025, at the age of 81.
