= Urbana Pops Orchestra =

Urbana Pops Orchestra (UPO)
- Orchestra
- Founded: 2010
- Location: Urbana, Illinois
- Principal conductor: Stephen L. Larson
- Website: www.urbanapops.org

The Urbana Pops Orchestra is a symphony orchestra based in Urbana, Illinois which focuses on both performance of orchestral pops music and education of local students.

== Beginnings ==
The Urbana Pops Orchestra (or "UPO") was first conceived in late 2009 as an extension of Urbana Park District's summer youth theater pit orchestra. The following year, Daniel F. Southerland and Stephen L. Larson co-founded a full orchestra from community members, high school students, and students at the University of Illinois. After a conductor, staff, and guild were formed, the orchestra rehearsed for the first time in June 2010 to prepare for its summer season. Consequent rehearsals led to its first concert "Urbana Pops at the Movies" (June 2010) and "Urbana Pops Plays Broadway" (July 2010). To conclude its first season, a reduced pit orchestra served as the music for summer 2010's Urbana Youth Theater production (in its original capacity) "Once Upon a Mattress."

== Concerts ==
To date, the Urbana Pops Orchestra has presented the following concerts:

- June 2010 - Urbana Pops at the Movies
- July 2010 - Urbana Pops Plays Broadway
- July 2010 - Once Upon a Mattress with Summer Youth Theater
- December 2010 - Urbana Pops Celebrates the Holidays
- June 2011 - Around the World in 80 Minutes
- July 2011 - Made in the USA
- December 2011 - Holiday Brass (featuring a brass ensemble)
- June 2012 - Magical Tales
- July 2012 - Made in the USA
- June 2013 - That's No Moon
- July 2013 - Made in the USA
- June 2014 - Sounds of Adventure
- July 2014 - Made in the USA
- June 2015 - Once Upon a Tune
- June 2016 - Video Games
- July 2016 - Made in America
- June 2017 - Cartoons in Concert
- July 2017 - Made in America
- June 2018 - Showstoppers!
- June 2019 - Plays Well With Others

== Orchestra Board ==
To help support for the UPO, the Urbana Pops Orchestra Board was formed in summer 2010 with the mission of fundraising, volunteer work, and marketing for the orchestra.
