= Southern Miss Symphony Orchestra =

The University of Southern Mississippi Symphony Orchestra is the oldest orchestra in Mississippi. Established in 1920, it has been under the direction of music director Dr. Gregory Wolynec since 2024. The orchestra is part of the University of Southern Mississippi School of Music.

The orchestra has performed with internationally known artists such as tenor Plácido Domingo, violinist Itzhak Perlman, cellist Yo-Yo Ma, flutist Sir James Galway, bassist Edgar Meyer; trumpeter/conductor Doc Severinsen, singer Ray Charles, pianist John Browning, flutist Jean-Pierre Rampal, and soprano Denyce Graves. Guest conductors have included Leonard Slatkin and Louis Lane.

During the academic year, the orchestra rehearses four times a week and presents an average of eight public performances each season. These performances range from regular symphony concerts to children's concerts, operas, ballets, and pops programs. The 80-member orchestra tours and performs concerts throughout the southeast United States. The orchestra has more than 13 countries represented by its students.

== History ==
The Southern Mississippi Symphony Orchestra is the oldest orchestra in Mississippi and was first organized in 1920 as the College Orchestra of the Mississippi Normal College under director Margaret Gillard.

In 1924, Hazel Horton Read became the next director of the small orchestra. No orchestra existed for the next five years until 1930, but little is known about the ensemble.

Dr. Jay Dean, became Director of Orchestral Activities at Southern Miss in 1988. The orchestra is an international organization and includes over 80 musicians from the U.S. and 14 other countries. As Director of Orchestral Activities, Dr. Dean selects works for each program with the aim that they be educationally and technically purposeful for the musicians and aesthetically pleasing and interesting for audiences. Programs with a wide variety of artists from myriad backgrounds and nationalities are a main goal of Dr. Dean and the SMSO. Children's concerts, ballet, opera, and pops concerts round out the repertoire of the SMSO.

SMSO is the only orchestra in Mississippi to work with Carnegie Hall's Weill Music Institute Communities Link Up! program. This groundbreaking effort allowed over 1,600 secondary school Mississippi students to perform with the university orchestra and study orchestral music. Additionally, the orchestra has developed a community and educational outreach program in conjunction with the City of Hattiesburg to bring musical opportunities to the community through performances and visits to local nursing homes, grade schools (K-12), and community centers.

Internationally renowned artists such as Itzhak Perlman, Yo-Yo Ma, Doc Severinsen, Ray Charles, John Browning, Jean-Pierre Rampal, Denyce Graves, Christopher Parkening, Edgar Meyer, Roberta Peters, Sir James Galway, Joshua Bell, and Plácido Domingo have performed with the orchestra. The SMSO is the only university orchestra in the world to have performed with Domingo, and it is the only orchestra in the world to have ever performed with the world's top four classical music performers.

The orchestra's musicians have played venues such as Bossier City, Mandeville, Meridian, Jackson, Biloxi, and Tupelo. In addition, an orchestra member is currently a featured soloist at New York's Kennedy Center.

The USMSO performs in Hattiesburg, Mississippi and is the only orchestra to market its events internationally. It holds an average of eight performances per year, some of which have been broadcast for television. When Ray Charles performed with the orchestra, an audience of 4000 from a 200-mile radius attended the concert. Additionally, Itzhak Perlman's, Yo Yo Ma's and Edgar Meyer's appearances each drew people locally as well as from Alabama, Louisiana, Arkansas, Tennessee, and Georgia, and internationally in the case of Mr. Meyer. Jean-Pierre Rampal brought in all of Mississippi's contiguous states as well as visitors from Michigan and Texas. Approximately 2,000 people statewide attended the Mississippi, the Birthplace of America's Music concert in which 1,500 musicians from all over Mississippi played. In 2002, The Night of 1000 Trumpets with Doc Severinsen, realized almost 1,000 guests from 32 states and 3 foreign countries, not including the 4,000 local residents who attended.
