= Jackson Symphony Orchestra (Michigan) =

Jackson Symphony Orchestra (JSO)
- Orchestra
- Founded: 1949
- Concert hall: Weatherwax Hall
- Principal conductor: Matthew Aubin
- Website: www.jacksonsymphony.org

The Jackson Symphony Orchestra (JSO) is an American orchestra based in Jackson, Michigan. The orchestra's main performing venues are the Potter Center of Jackson College and Weatherwax Hall. The orchestra's season typically consists of five orchestral concerts, the Nutcracker, and a number of outreach concerts within the Jackson community. They also have their Music on Tap series which brings performers from various genres to Jackson. Past concerts have included jazz, rock, folk, bluegrass, soul, and musical comedy shows.

The JSO has received significant financial support from Comerica Bank, including the 2007 donation of 16,000 ft of rehearsal space in downtown Jackson.

== The Community Music School (JSO CMS) ==
Since 1991 the JSO runs the JSO Community Music School with the goals of providing private and group music instruction on instruments for community residents and providing additional employment opportunities for orchestra members to attract and maintain quality players for the orchestra. The music school instructs over 200 students and maintains a faculty of 16 instructors, most of whom are orchestra members.

== Music directors, conductors ==
Music directors

- 1950–1955 Pedro Paz
- 1954-1957 Emil Raab
- 1960-1961 Gustave Rosseels
- 1961-1962 Romeo Tata
- 1962-1963 Richard Massman
- 1968-1972 Theo Alcántara
- 1972-1975 Herbert Butler
- 1975-1978 Jerry Bilik
- 1978–2017 Stephen Osmond
- 2017–present Matthew Aubin
