= Jackson Symphony Orchestra (Tennessee) =

The Jackson Symphony Orchestra (JSO) is a professional orchestra in Jackson, Tennessee.

The JSO was established in 1961 with James Petty as its first conductor. Petty served until 1985, when he retired. He was succeeded in 1986 by Jordan Tang.

JSO reports having an annual budget of more than $700,000 and some 65 to 70 paid musicians. It offers an annual subscription series of seven concerts, including four classical concerts and three pops concerts.
