= Portland Youth Philharmonic =

Youth orchestra based in Portland, Oregon, U.S.

- Youth orchestra
- Former name: Portland Junior Symphony (1924–1978)
- Founded: 1924
- Location: Portland, Oregon, U.S.
- Music director: David Hattner (2008–present); Mei-Ann Chen (2002–2007); Huw Edwards (1995–2002); Jacob Avshalomov (1954–1995); Jacques Gershkovitch (1924–1953); Founder; Mary V. Dodge
- Website: portlandyouthphil.org

The Portland Youth Philharmonic (PYP) is the oldest youth orchestra in the United States, established in 1924 as the Portland Junior Symphony (PJS). Now based in Portland, Oregon, the orchestra's origin dates back to 1910, when music teacher Mary V. Dodge began playing music for local children in Burns, Oregon. Dodge purchased instruments for the children and organized the orchestra, which would become known as the Sagebrush Symphony Orchestra. After touring the state, including a performance at the Oregon State Fair in Salem, the orchestra disbanded in 1918 when Dodge moved to Portland. There, Dodge opened a violin school and became music director of the Irvington School Orchestra.

Hoping to create a permanent youth symphony, Dodge approached Jacques Gershkovitch in 1923 to serve as music director of the Portland Junior Symphony. The ensemble performed for the first time in 1925, and by the 1930s, PJS concerts were being broadcast nationally. Following Gershkovitch's death in 1953, alumnus Jacob Avshalomov became the orchestra's music director. The ensemble's name was changed to the Portland Youth Philharmonic in 1978.

The PYP has had five conductors and music directors during its history: Gershkovitch (1924–1953), Avshalomov (1954–1995), Huw Edwards (1995–2002), Mei-Ann Chen (2002–2007), and professional clarinetist David Hattner (2008–present). The PYP's umbrella organization, the Portland Youth Philharmonic Association, consists of four ensembles, including the philharmonic orchestra, the conservatory orchestra, the wind ensemble, and the young string ensemble. Participating musicians range in age from seven to twenty-two years and attend dozens of schools within the Portland metropolitan area and surrounding communities.

== History ==
Gershkovitch
Avshalomov
│
1910
│
1915
│
1920
│
1925
│
1930
│
1935
│
1940
│
1945
│
1950
│
1955
│
1960
│
1965
Avshalomov
Edwards
Chen
Hattner
│
1965
│
1970
│
1975
│
1980
│
1985
│
1990
│
1995
│
2000
│
2005
│
2010
│
2015
│
2020
│
2025

=== Mary V. Dodge and the Sagebrush Symphony Orchestra ===
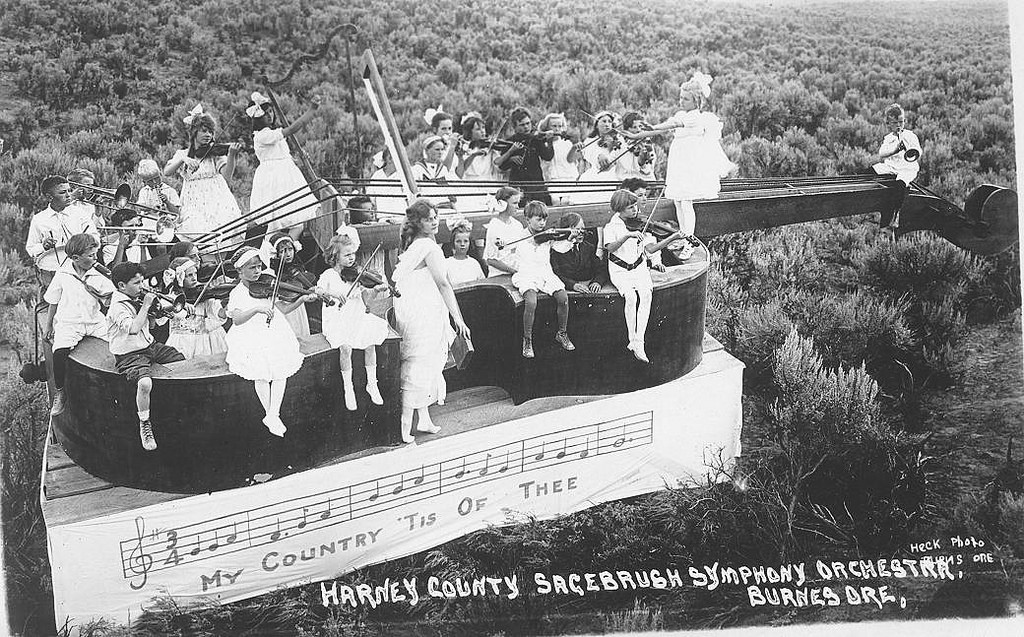
Members of the Sagebrush Symphony on a Fourth of July float in Burns in 1915

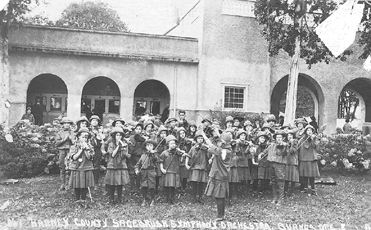
Sagebrush Symphony in 1916

Mary V. Dodge (birth name Mary B. Thompson) was born in Arkansas in 1876. When she was five years old, her father died, causing her and her sisters to be placed in an orphanage while their mother finished nursing school. Mary Thompson became interested in music while attending a Catholic boarding school, and later became a musician and teacher in Boston and New York City. After moving to Portland, Oregon, where her aunt owned a boarding house, she met and married civil engineer and double bass player Mott Dodge. Soon after they married, Mott was transferred to Harney County for a work project.

In 1910, they settled in Burns in an engineering camp known as the "Boston tents". Mary and Mott had one child, Glen, who learned from his mother how to play the fiddle starting at a young age. A classically trained violinist with a "love of children and ... a deeply democratic view about making music", Dodge began teaching local children how to play string instruments, first in resident tents then in a photography studio. With assistance from parents and a professional flautist from Italy, who taught the children how to play wind instruments and conducted, Dodge assembled a small orchestra. According to former violin student Ruth Saunders, "All of the sighing, tooting and drumming soon made the citizens aware that something was going on, and due to her powers of persuasion, they found themselves devoting their time, talents, money and children to the creation of the Sagebrush Orchestra."

The orchestra's first concert was held in 1912 at Tonawama Hall in Burns. With funds provided by rancher Bill Hanley, lawyer and artist Charles Erskine Scott Wood, and additional Burns businessmen, Dodge purchased musical instruments for the children and expanded the orchestra to between thirty and thirty-five members. By 1915, the orchestra was touring throughout eastern Oregon on a Chautauqua circuit. With $2,000 in funds raised by the aforementioned businessmen, the ensemble visited western Oregon in September 1916 and performed seven concerts in a two-day period. By that point known as the Sagebrush Symphony Orchestra, the ensemble won $100 at the Oregon State Fair in Salem and performed several concerts in Portland, including one at the Imperial Hotel and one for opera singer Ernestine Schumann-Heink at the Portland Hotel. During the symphony's week-long tour, one Oregonian reporter wrote: "The journey of the little people is considered one of the finest exhibitions of community spirit ever shown in this state." Schumann-Heink planned to support the orchestra's efforts to tour, and promised to host a benefit concert the following year. However, the nation's involvement in World War I interrupted plans for additional tours. The orchestra disbanded in 1918 when Dodge relocated to Portland.

=== Establishment of the Portland Junior Symphony ===
Mary Dodge initially returned to Portland with her husband when he was transferred there for work, but when his job fell through, the couple separated and Mary remained in Portland. Now a single woman, Dodge changed her name to Mary V. Dodge, with the "V" standing for "violin". She opened a violin school and became music director of the Irvington Grade School orchestra. With the hope of creating a permanent youth symphony, Dodge began hosting rehearsals in her attic. However, due to gender inequality in the United States at the time, Dodge knew that a professional male conductor would need to lead the orchestra.

Dodge approached Jacques Gershkovitch, a Russian immigrant in Portland who was guest conductor for the Portland Symphony (which would later become the Oregon Symphony), after seeing him conduct. Though Gershkovitch first explained that he did not teach children, Dodge insisted that he listen to the youth ensemble she had assembled. One orchestra member recalled: "I well remember the excitement of that night when Gershkovitch climbed the stairs to Mary Dodge's attic, where we had assembled to play for him. He listened as we played our hearts out. He applauded us and said that if we got the missing instruments, he would take us on." In an attempt to hand over the baton to Gershkovitch, he simply said to Dodge, "I take." Initially, Dodge remained as associate director of the orchestra; she also assisted with sectional rehearsals, appointed a board of directors, and renamed the ensemble to the Portland Junior Symphony Orchestra in 1924. The original board of directors established the mission of the orchestra: "to encourage appreciation and rendition of orchestral music by young people, to give public symphonic and popular concerts, to discover and develop latent talent among the children of Portland". Six years later, the orchestra was financially sound, and Dodge resigned to focus on teaching. She also became increasingly dedicated to a scientific approach to bowing. Dodge died in 1954.

=== Jacques Gershkovitch (1924–1953) ===
Jacques Gershkovitch

Born in 1884 to a Jewish family in Irkutsk, Russia, Gershkovitch grew up listening to chamber music and was sent to Saint Petersburg in his late teens to study at the Imperial Conservatory. Gershkovitch arrived with "17 rubles in his pocket and his flute under his arm"; he auditioned and was awarded a scholarship. At the conservatory, he learned from respected Russian composers such as Alexander Glazunov, Nikolai Rimsky-Korsakov and Nikolai Tcherepnin, and completed coursework in opera and ballet production. In 1913, he graduated with honors in flute and conducting, and was awarded the Schubert Scholarship for a year of study under German conductor Arthur Nikisch in Berlin. However, World War I forced Gershkovitch to return to Irkutsk and enlist in the military. Gershkovitch began his conducting career as head of the Imperial Russian Army's military symphony orchestra, a position he held through the 1917 revolution. In 1918, Gershkovitch married in Irkutsk and established a successful fine arts conservatory and symphony orchestra, which continued under the Bolshevik regime. Gershkovitch and his wife left Russia in 1921 for China, where they befriended composer Aaron Avshalomov. Ballerina Anna Pavlova offered Gershkovitch an assistant conductor position with her orchestra, which was touring throughout the Orient. Gershkovitch settled in Tokyo to lead the newly organized Tokyo Symphony Orchestra until the Great Kantō earthquake of 1923 "disorganized all the business and musical interests of the city". The couple fled Japan and arrived in San Francisco in November 1923. They eventually made their way to Portland in 1924; it was here that Gershkovitch was approached by Dodge to lead the Portland Junior Symphony. Gershkovitch taught flute and conducted the Ellison-White Conservatory's student orchestra, at the time directed by Jacob Avshalomov, until his new PJS duties required his full attention.

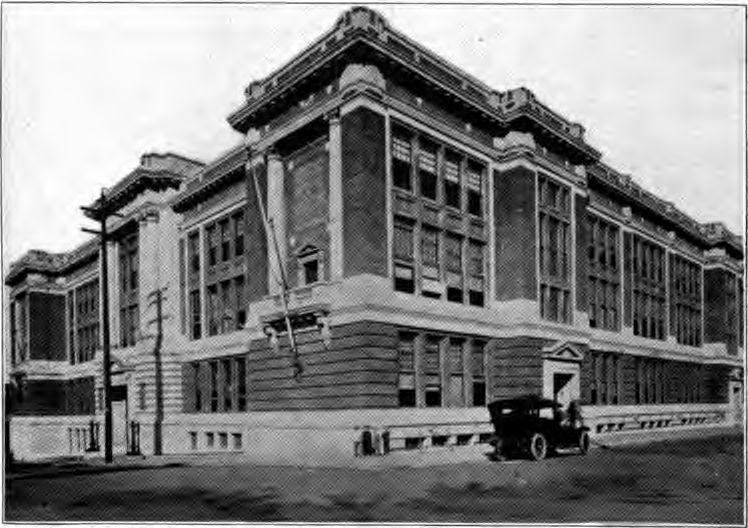
The symphony's first performance was at Lincoln High School (pictured c. 1920)

The symphony performed for the first time on February 14, 1925, at Portland's Lincoln High School Auditorium (which later became Portland State University's Lincoln Hall), performing Schubert's Unfinished Symphony. At the ensemble's first rehearsal, Gershkovitch introduced the composition and said, "You play, or I keel you", in his heavy Russian accent. Concert attendees reportedly rushed the stage after the debut concert to congratulate the musicians, Gershkovitch and Dodge, who was present and was called to the stage. One reviewer for the Oregon Sunday Journal wrote the following day that the "audience that almost filled the auditorium to capacity broke into storm upon storm of applause". According to Ronald Russell, author of A New West to Explore (1938), the audience "had experienced a new emotional thrill, and forthwith became strong advocates and supporters of the junior symphony cause."

In spring 1925, the orchestra gained national attention by performing at the convention of the National Federation of Music Clubs in Portland. The Sunday Oregonian reported that convention attendees were "so deeply impressed that they declared it unhesitatingly the most wonderful organization of its kind in the entire country". The symphony's second season premiered to a capacity audience on November 25, 1925, with the 75-member ensemble performing Mozart's Symphony No. 40 in its entirety along with "In the Village" from Ippolitov-Ivanov's Caucasian Sketches, the waltz from Rebikov's The Christmas Tree and the march from Wagner's opera Tannhäuser.

Early in the organization's history, the Portland Junior Symphony consisted of a full symphony orchestra, a choir, and a ballet unit. According to Wither Youth (1935), approximately 350 young artists participated in these groups each season (about 100 in the orchestra, 150 in the chorus, and 100 in the ballet). Membership was granted on "merit, ability, seriousness and interest", and there were no tuition fees for participation (this has since changed). Orchestra members were also encouraged to take private lessons. The minimum schedule for participants included two rehearsals during each week of the eight-month season, along with dress rehearsals prior to performances. Three or four concerts were presented each season, many at Portland Public Auditorium (now known as Keller Auditorium). The organization was sustained financially through concert admission and donations—instruments, funds towards scholarships and the general endowment, and music for the association's library were also accepted to ensure the symphony's continued viability.

"To command attention, maintain discipline, and secure the maximum results he resorted to sarcasm, praise, ridicule, humor, flattery, scolding, dirty looks and the highest commendation—all in a quaint and very special brand of English. The children loved it, for it always had an element of the unexpected."

— Jacob Avshalomov, later the orchestra's conductor and music director, on Gershkovitch's style

Gershkovitch, known for his discipline and high performance standards, conducted the orchestra for 29 years, gaining national attention for the ensemble and pioneering the youth orchestra movement. By the 1930s, PJS concerts were broadcast nationally on the CBS Radio Network. In 1956 and 1958, both NBC and CBS transmitted broadcasts of the orchestra's programs across the United States, and three transcribed programs were broadcast overseas by Voice of America. Gershkovitch was also responsible for adding a Preparatory Orchestra (later renamed the Conservatory Orchestra) due to increased membership. Gershkovitch tried to incorporate at least one American composition in each concert. He had a distinctive personality and way with words, using expressions (recollected in one former student's diary) such as "More nicely, can't you more?" and "Debussy is beauty, French beauty". For 25 years, David Campbell served as Master of Ceremonies for the Children's Concerts, since Gershkovitch "never gained a command of English sufficient enough for public use". Gershkovitch's often-quoted philosophy was that he did "not teach music", but rather he taught "young people through music". Though there were times when he also wished to conduct professional ensembles, Gershkovitch's primary concern was educating the youth. Apart from music education, Gershkovitch stressed the importance of proper conduct, manners, and "values in life and art" as ways to build character. Following Gershkovitch's death in 1953, guest conductors led the orchestra for its 30th season—one conductor was Jacob Avshalomov, a Columbia University teacher and PJS alumnus who had studied under Gershkovitch while a student at Reed College from 1939 to 1941.

=== Jacob Avshalomov (1954–1995) ===
Jacob Avshalomov was born on March 28, 1919, in Tsingtao, China. His father was Aaron Avshalomov, the Siberian-born composer known for "oriental musical materials cast in western forms and media", and mother was from San Francisco. Jacob received musical instruction from his father at a young age. At age eight, Avshalomov visited Portland from China with his parents, who were guests of Gershkovitch for several months in 1927. Aaron Avshalomov had become friends with Gershkovitch in the Orient (when Gershkovitch and his wife met Aaron, Jacob was three years old). However, because they did not hold permanent visas, the family returned to China. Jacob graduated from British and American schools before age fifteen, then worked as a factory supervisor in Tientsin, Shanghai and Beijing over a span of four years. Avshalomov was also active in sports and won the diving championship of North China. In 1937, Avshalomov assisted his father in Shanghai with ballet production and worked on scores. He then enlisted with a British volunteer corps after Japan's invasion of China during the Second Sino-Japanese War, and eventually returned to the United States with his mother in December 1937. Avshalomov spent a year in Los Angeles, followed by two years in Portland, Oregon, and two more years at the Eastman School of Music. During World War II, he lived in London, where he conducted a performance of Johann Sebastian Bach's St John Passion.

Avshalomov became the Portland Junior Symphony second orchestra conductor in 1954. During his forty-year tenure, Avshalomov produced several recordings, several of which included pieces commissioned by the orchestra, making PJS the first known recording orchestra in the Pacific Northwest. He led the ensemble on its first international tour in 1970. The orchestra became known as the Portland Youth Philharmonic in 1978. 1984 marked the orchestra's sixtieth anniversary as well as Avshalomov's thirtieth year as conductor. Avshalomov retired in 1995 after an estimated 640 concerts and 10,000 auditions.

=== Huw Edwards (1995–2002) ===
Huw Edwards, born in South Wales, moved with his parents to England and sang in choirs as a child. He witnessed his first opera, Giuseppe Verdi's Un ballo in maschera, at eleven years old when his parents took him to the Royal Opera House in Covent Garden. Just seven years later, he was on that same podium conducting W. S. Gilbert and Arthur Sullivan's operetta H.M.S. Pinafore. Edwards has been conducting since age seventeen, when he became music director of the Maidstone Opera Company in England, a position he held for six years. Edwards attended the University of Surrey, where he conducted the college orchestra, along with an ensemble that he formed on his own. At 23 years old, he won a conducting competition which sent him to the University of Surrey in England and Southern Methodist University in Dallas, Texas. Edwards moved to the Pacific Northwest after he held a lecturer position at Northwestern University in Chicago, where he was also a doctoral candidate.

Edwards become music director of the Portland Youth Philharmonic in 1995. In 1997, he was honored by the American Society of Composers, Authors and Publishers (ASCAP) for his programming. Edwards also made five recordings during his tenure and led the orchestra on two international tours: Canada in 1998, and Australia/New Zealand in 2000. PYP represented the United States at the Banff International Festival of Youth Orchestras in 1998. Edwards established a peer mentoring program that partnered orchestra musicians with low-income students who had little access to music education. From 1998 to 2005, he was a faculty member at the Marrowstone Music Festival. During the same period, Edwards left PYP in 2002 for a position with the Seattle Youth Symphony Orchestra, which he also held until 2005. Edwards was appointed music director of the Olympia Symphony Orchestra in 2003.

=== Mei-Ann Chen (2002–2007) ===
Native to Taiwan, Mei-Ann Chen wanted to be a conductor from the age of ten. She began playing violin and piano starting at a young age and collected batons, believing that "different pieces needed different kinds of batons". In 1989, Chen attended a concert in Taipei by the American Youth Orchestra, a touring ensemble of Boston's New England Conservatory. The day following the concert, Chen played for conductor Benjamin Zander in a closed basement hotel bar and was offered a scholarship immediately. She performed with the American Youth Orchestra for two months before being invited to attend the Walnut Hill School, a preparatory school linked to the New England Conservatory, at age sixteen. For more than three years, Chen lived with a couple in Boston she referred to as her "American parents" (Mark Churchill and Marylou Speaker Churchill; the latter was once a member of the Portland Junior Symphony). Chen continued her undergraduate and graduate work at the Conservatory and became the first person to graduate from the institution with a double master's degree in conducting and violin performance. Chen remained in Boston for nine years, then enrolled at the University of Michigan to obtain a Doctor of Musical Arts degree in conducting.

"I pushed [musicians of the Portland Youth Philharmonic] quite hard, but at the same time I was doing that for them, they helped me find my own voice. There is something so genuine about young people making music with their entire heart. Portland took a chance on me and helped me realize my goals. I couldn't have asked for more."

— Chen on her role as conductor of the Philharmonic

Chen became PYP's fourth conductor in 2002 after being selected by a committee of "musically inclined" parents, a member of the orchestra, and representatives from the Oregon Symphony and Portland Opera. She conducted both the philharmonic ensemble as well as the conservatory orchestra. During her five-year tenure with the organization, PYP debuted at Carnegie Hall, received its third ASCAP award in 2004 for innovating programming, and began collaborating with the Oregon Symphony (Chen was the ensemble's assistant conductor from 2003 to 2005) and Chamber Music Northwest. In April 2005, Chen became the first woman to win the Malko Competition, the "world's most prestigious prize" for young conductors. She also won the Taki Concordia Fellowship in 2007, an award established by Baltimore Symphony Orchestra music director Marin Alsop to support "promising" female conductors. Chen was presented the Sunburst Award by Young Audiences for her contribution to music education and was named "Educator of the Week" by KKCW.

While conductor of the philharmonic, Chen set up a box in her office so that students could leave notes for her. One musician in the orchestra felt that Chen was "kind of formal" during rehearsal but felt "like a big sister" once practice ended. Chen has been described as a "firecracker: small, bright and full of ka-boom", and her enthusiasm at times caused her to lose her breath. One board member of the organization praised Chen's attitude and felt that her lack of ego was a "rare quality in top symphony performers".

Chen turned down a position with the Oregon Symphony to continue work at PYP. In 2007, she accompanied the orchestra on an international tour to Asia, where her parents saw her conduct for the first time. The philharmonic offered a total of six performances between June 29 and July 17 in Kaohsiung, Tainan and Taipei, Taiwan, as well as in Seoul and Ulsan, South Korea. Though Chen initially thought she would remain with the Philharmonic for ten years, she left in 2007 to become assistant conductor of the Atlanta Symphony. She said of her departure: "The musicians at PYP have become my kids. When I look back, these five years will always be the most memorable time of my musical career." Guest conductors during the 2007–2008 season included Ken Selden, director of orchestral studies at Portland State University, former Seattle Symphony conductor Alastair Willis, and former PYP conductors Huw Edwards and Chen herself.

=== David Hattner (2008–present) ===
David Hattner was chosen from a field of candidates to be the conductor and music director of PYP in 2008. A graduate of Northwestern University, Hattner was a clarinet student of Robert Marcellus. Before joining PYP, he had conducted Camerata Atlantica, the Garden State Philharmonic Orchestra and the Oklahoma Chamber Ensemble, and guest-conducted the Brooklyn Symphony Orchestra, Cincinnati Chamber Orchestra, Ensemble Sospeso, International Contemporary Ensemble and the Massapequa Philharmonic Orchestra. Hattner also participated in the American Academy of Conducting at Aspen three times, where he studied with Murry Sidlin and David Zinman. He has been the principal clarinet with the Cascade Music Festival Orchestra in Bend, the Key West Symphony Orchestra, the New Jersey Opera Theater, and the Princeton Symphony Orchestra. Hattner made his Oregon Symphony debut in January 2011. In addition to conducting and clarinet performance, Hattner has participated in live multimedia performances, accompanying silent films both nationally and internationally. PYP began offering chamber orchestra concerts during Hattner's tenure.

Today, the Portland Youth Philharmonic consists of four ensembles: the Portland Youth Philharmonic Orchestra, the Portland Youth Conservatory Orchestra, the Portland Youth Wind Ensemble, and the Portland Youth String Ensemble. Each group is selected in open auditions in the spring and fall and is highly selective.

== Performances ==
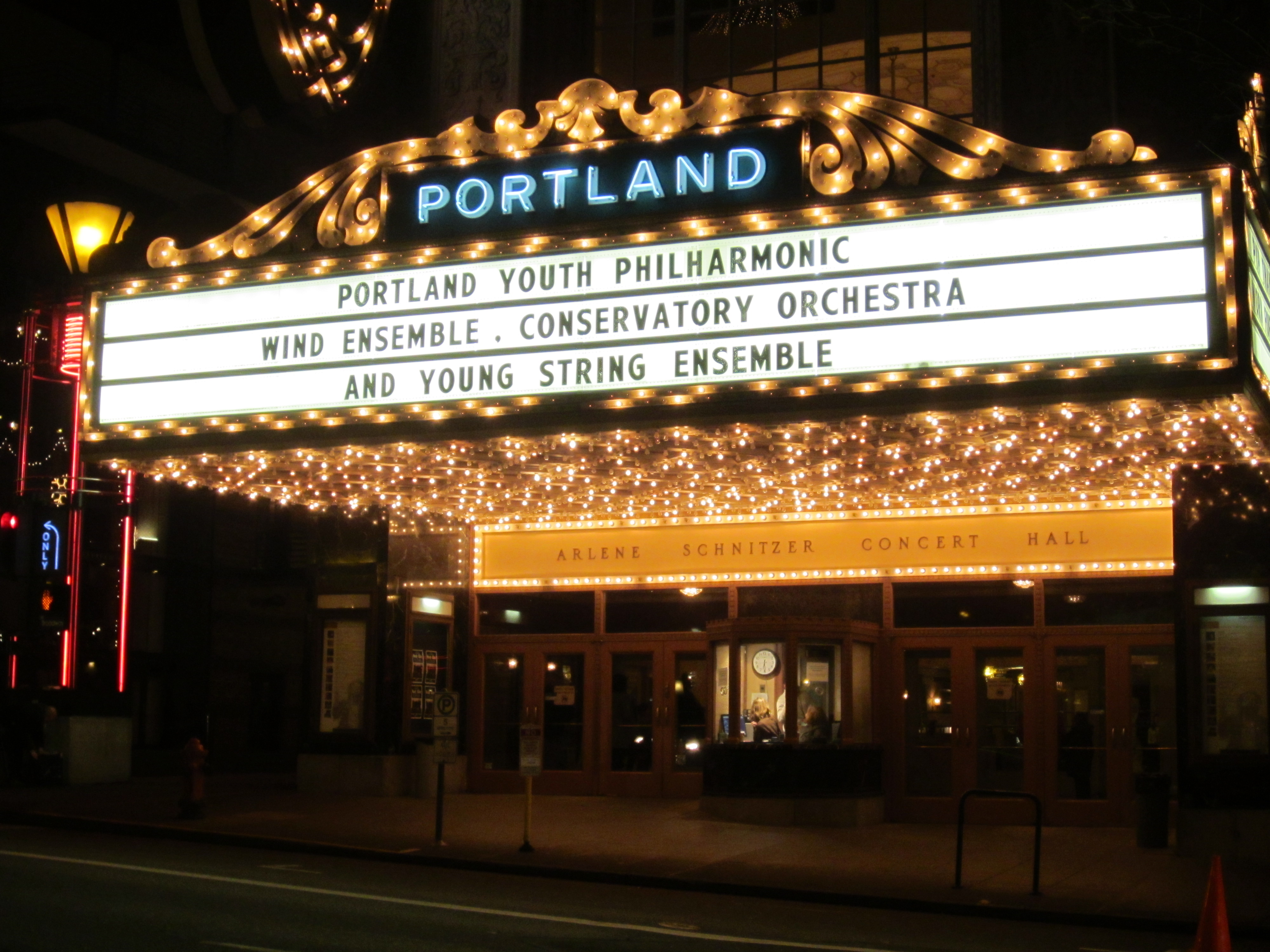
The names of Portland Youth Philharmonic's ensembles displayed on the Arlene Schnitzer Concert Hall's marquee, December 2011

Having previously conducted ballet repertory, Gershkovitch was approached in 1934 by Willam Christensen of the Portland Creative Theatre and School of Music, Drama, and Dance to collaborate. Gershkovitch suggested that the Portland Junior Symphony and the ballet studio perform portions of Tchaikovsky's The Nutcracker as part of Portland's annual Rose Festival. 5,000 spectators attended the Rose Queen coronation ceremony at Civic Auditorium to witness the production, which featured 100 ballerinas and dancers. The production was deemed a success for all involved and established Christensen as "Portland's leading ballet teacher". Gershkovitch and Christensen collaborated at the Rose Festival the following year (1935), performing Coppélia twice to enthusiastic crowds.

In 1998, PYP was the sole representative of the United States at the Banff International Festival of Youth Orchestras in Canada. The orchestra's Carnegie Hall debut was in 2004. In October 2010, PYP returned to Burns, Oregon, to celebrate the centennial anniversary of the establishment of the Sagebrush Symphony. A special performance honored Mary Dodge, the history of the organization and music educators with music by Howard Hanson and Charles Ives.

=== International tours ===
PJS made its first international tour to England, Italy and Portugal in 1970. Subsequent international tours included Japan in 1979; Austria and Yugoslavia in 1984; Austria, Czechoslovakia, Germany and Hungary in 1989; Japan and South Korea in 1992 and Germany in 1994. Prior to the 1984 visit to Europe, the orchestra celebrated its sixtieth anniversary by performing at Avery Fisher Hall in New York City alongside the New York Philharmonic. The concert consisted of three pieces performed by PYP and conducted by Avshalomov ("Dance of the Clowns" from Pyotr Ilyich Tchaikovsky's opera The Maid of Orleans, the first movement of Schubert's Unfinished Symphony and the fourth movement of Avshalomov's own symphony, The Oregon), a performance by the New York Philharmonic under Leonard Bernstein's leadership and finally Tchaikovsky's Romeo and Juliet conducted by Bernstein with a combined ensemble of 210 musicians.

The orchestra traveled to Australia and New Zealand in 2000 under the leadership of Huw Edwards, performing Dmitri Shostakovich's Symphony No. 10. In 2007, PYP performed six concerts throughout Taiwan (in Kaohsiung, Tainan and Taipei) and South Korea (Ulsan and Seoul).

== Awards and recognitions ==
In 1993, ASCAP honored PYP with its award for "Adventuresome Programming of Contemporary Music". ASCAP presented PYP with second and third awards in 1997 and 2004, respectively. In 2010, PYP received the Oregon Symphony's Patty Vemer Excellence in Music Education Award. Created in memory of Patty Vemer, once the director of music education at the Oregon Symphony, the award "honors those who have made significant contributions to music education and their community and who have served as an inspiration to their students". This marked the first year the award had been given to an organization.

== Alumni ==
Notable alumni of the orchestra include Robert Mann, who helped found the Juilliard String Quartet, and Eugene Linden, founder and conductor of the Tacoma Philharmonic Orchestra. Additional students of Gershkovitch who later became professional musicians include Jesse Kregal, Marilynn (Nudelman) Kregal, Barry Lamont, Beverly LeBeck, Frederic Rothchild, Warren Signor and Jacob Avshalomov himself.

Other professional musicians who were once part of the orchestra include Glenn Reeves, later a principal violist for the Oregon Symphony; Brian Hamilton, who became a cellist for the Tacoma Philharmonic Orchestra; and Marion Fox, who later joined the Oregon Symphony as a violinist. Harp player Frances Pozzi and Earl Rankin later became staff artists for KOIN and KGW, respectively.

== Recordings ==
- Oregon Composers (1994, Albany), conducted by Jacob Avshalomov
- Portland Youth Philharmonic: Live in Concert (1996, Portland Youth Philharmonic), conducted by Huw Edwards
- Fountain of Youth (March 27, 1998, Portland Youth Philharmonic), conducted by Edwards, recorded live at the Arlene Schnitzer Concert Hall
- The Territory Beyond (2000, Portland Youth Philharmonic), conducted by Edwards
- Reaching New Heights (2002, Portland Youth Philharmonic), conducted by Edwards

With Jacob Avshalomov

- Portland Youth Philharmonic (1992, CRI)
- Music by Avshalomov, Harris & Ward (1994, CRI)
- Jacob Avshalomov: Symphony of Songs, etc. (1995, Albany)
- Avshalomov: Fabled Cities (1998, Albany)

== See also ==
- American classical music
- List of symphony orchestras in the United States
- List of youth orchestras in the United States
- Music education for young children
- Music education in the United States
- Metropolitan Youth Symphony
