= Huw Edwards (conductor) =

Welsh conductor

- Born: South Wales, United Kingdom
- Occupation: Conductor

Huw Edwards is a Welsh conductor. Edwards' conducting career began at age seventeen when he became music director of the Maidstone Opera Company in England. He later attended the University of Surrey, where he conducted the college orchestra along with an ensemble that he formed himself. At age twenty-three, he won a conducting competition which sent him to Southern Methodist University in Dallas, Texas. He then held a lecturer position at Northwestern University in Chicago, where he was also a doctoral candidate. Edwards was conductor and music director of the Portland Youth Philharmonic from 1995 to 2002 followed by the Seattle Youth Symphony from 2002 to 2005. He served as music director of the Portland Columbia Symphony from 2000 to 2012 and with the Olympia Symphony Orchestra from 2003 to 2020.

== Early life and education ==
Seeing Claudio Abbado conduct an opera at Royal Covent Garden in London when I was 11; I was sat on the side of the theater so I could see into the pit. I was totally mesmerized with this man with a white stick and even though he was not making any sounds, he was controlling the sounds and music. It obviously struck a nerve deep inside of me.

— Edwards on the origin of his career

Born in South Wales, Edwards moved with his parents to England and sang in choirs as a child. He witnessed his first opera (Giuseppe Verdi's Un ballo in maschera) at eleven years old when his parents took him to the Royal Opera House in Covent Garden. Seven years later, he was conducting Gilbert and Sullivan's operetta H.M.S. Pinafore on that same podium. Edwards played violin and trumpet through grammar school and high school but abandoned performance for conducting.

Edwards has been conducting since age seventeen when he became music director of the Maidstone Opera Company in England, a position he held for six years. Edwards attended the University of Surrey, where he conducted the college orchestra along with an ensemble that he formed himself. He won a conducting competition in 1988 which sent him to Southern Methodist University in Dallas, Texas at twenty-three years old. There he experienced "culture shock", being "accustomed to the rolling hills of England and the cosmopolitan buzz of London". He held a lecturer position at Northwestern University in Chicago, where he was also a doctoral candidate. Four years later he moved to the Pacific Northwest. Throughout his lifetime, Edwards has received instruction from Anshel Brusilow (Dallas), chorus leader Simon Johnson (London), Eduardo Mata, Barry Wordsworth, and Victor Yampolsky (Northwestern University).

== Career ==
Prior to joining the Portland Youth Philharmonic, Edwards had written extensively about music. He contributed to Stagebill in Chicago, Dallas, London and Washington, D.C. and wrote program notes for Daniel Barenboim, Yo-Yo Ma and the Guarnari Quartet. He had also conducted opera and orchestras throughout Australia, Canada, Hong Kong, Japan, New Zealand, the United Kingdom, and the United States. Edwards has performed with the Annas Bay Opera, Dallas Symphony Orchestra, Eugene Symphony, Memphis Symphony Orchestra, Oregon Symphony, Rose City Chamber Orchestra, Vancouver Symphony Orchestra, Wisconsin Chamber Orchestra, and Yakima Symphony. He has been invited to speak at the American Symphony Orchestra League convention in Boston and assisted with the organisation's "Meet for the Millennium" project.

=== Portland Youth Philharmonic ===
Edwards became conductor and music director of the Portland Youth Philharmonic (PYP) in 1995, following Jacob Avshalomov's forty-year tenure to become the orchestra's third conductor. He was selected unanimously by a twelve-person committee from a field of more than one hundred candidates, and was officially handed the baton by Avshalomov at the season opening Riverside Classics concert on 30 August. After Avshalomov conducted the first half of the concert, Edwards completed PYP's set with performances of works by Ludwig van Beethoven, Johannes Brahms, Franz Schubert, and Nikolai Rimsky-Korsakov. The program for the first subscription series concert, which received positive reception, included: Giuseppe Verdi's Nabucco Overture, Ralph Vaughan Williams's Serenade to Music, and Paul Hindemith's Symphonic Metamorphosis on Themes of Carl Maria von Weber. In addition to the four season subscription concerts performed at the Arlene Schnitzer Concert Hall, the 1995–1996 season included performances at the Newport Performing Arts Center in Newport and The Resort at the Mountain near Mount Hood, as well as in Eugene, Salem, and Newberg. In 1996 the first interactive Children's Concert was broadcast live via satellite across Oregon. The collaboration between PYP and Multnomah Community TV continued beyond 1996; in 1998 concerts were streamed as far away as Tucson, Arizona, and a 1999 recording became a finalist in the national Hometown Video Festival.

Released on 27 March 1998, Fountain of Youth became the orchestra's sixth commercial recording on Compact Disc (previous recordings were vinyl or cassette). The compilation album included works recorded at the Arlene Schnitzer Concert Hall during seasons seventy-three and seventy-four. In January 1999, Portland Parent published an article by Edwards titled "The Role of Classical Music in the Lives of Young People", which discussed the benefits of classical music to child learning development. The 1998–1999 season included performances in Salem, Newberg, Welches, St. Helens, and Milwaukie and Longview, Washington in addition to the regular subscription series. On 10 February 1999 the orchestra opened a Portland Trail Blazers game at the Rose Garden performing The Star-Spangled Banner.

During Edwards' seven years with the orchestra, he and other PYP representatives established a peer mentor program which partnered orchestra musicians with low-income students with little access to music education, and earned the ensemble its second ASCAP award for "Adventurous Programming and Commitment to Contemporary Music". He made five recordings and led the orchestra on two tours: in April 1998 the Philharmonic represented the United States at the Banff International Festival of Youth Orchestras in Canada, and the orchestra toured Australia and New Zealand in 2000. The tour included performances in Auckland, Brisbane, Canberra, Armidale, Newcastle, Sydney, and Melbourne. Edwards also recorded Gabriel Fauré's Requiem at St. Mary's Cathedral as a collaboration with Cantores in Ecclesia. Edwards left PYP in 2002 and was succeeded by Mei-Ann Chen. Guest conductors during PYP's 2007–2008 season included Ken Selden, director of orchestral studies at Portland State University, former Seattle Symphony conductor Alastair Willis, along with former PYP conductors Edwards and Chen.

=== Seattle Youth Symphony Orchestra ===
He became music director of the Seattle Youth Symphony at the start of its sixtieth season (2002–2003), putting him in charge of 1,000 young musicians participating in the symphony and its four preparatory orchestras as well as the organisation's outreach programs and the Marrowstone Music Festival program. Edwards increased the Seattle orchestra's repertoire by performing works by British composers of the 20th century and by premiering works by American composers such as John Mackey. One Seattle Post-Intelligencer contributor wrote that Edwards made a "fine choice" for the ensemble, noting that he "nurture[d], coache[d] and encourage[d] his musicians". Furthermore, she claimed that his program notes were a "model of clarity and fascinating detail". Edwards remained music director of the Seattle Youth Symphony Orchestra until 2005. He has stated the following about working with young musicians:

[With young musicians] You have to teach and explain more. You have to fire their imagination. With professionals, you look for clarity and consistency. With students, you have to motivate and explain, using different approaches. Their attention span can come and go. It is unpredictable. From first rehearsal to performance, they will come a long way. I am very big on team work, and I tell them they are part of a team and individual egos are less important.

=== Portland Columbia Symphony, Olympia Symphony Orchestra ===
Edwards began serving as music director of the Portland Columbia Symphony in 2000. His year-long audition process for the music director position with the Olympia Symphony Orchestra began during the 2002–2003 season. The season also marked his fifth with the Marrowstone Summer Music program, where he remained until 2005. In 2010, Edwards was one of four finalists for the conductor position with the Yakima Symphony Orchestra.

In April 2012 Edwards announced his resignation at the end of his twelfth season with the Portland Columbia Symphony, citing exhaustion from the commutes between Olympia and Portland as the reason. He has been named Conductor Emeritus and Principal Guest Conductor and returned for the 2012–2013 season finale concert.

During the final performance of the Olympia Symphony Orchestra's 2014–15 season it was announced that Edwards had signed a ten-year contract extension as its conductor. In September 2019, he announced that although several years remained on his contract, the 2019–2020 season would be his final season with the Olympia Symphony Orchestra.

=== University of Puget Sound ===
In May 2012, Edwards accepted the orchestra conductor position at the University of Puget Sound, a private liberal arts college located in Tacoma, Washington.

== Interests ==
Dedicated to music education, Edwards enjoys conducting Beethoven for youth orchestras. He has admitted that he did not envision a career conducting youth orchestras but also that he "did not rule them out". His favourite composition is Parsifal by Richard Wagner; other favourites include unaccompanied choral music, cello suites by Bach, quartets by Beethoven and jazz, including Nat King Cole. Apart from music, Edwards likes the Chicago Bears, CrossFit, golf, kayaking, Masterpiece Theater, poetry, and Rhône wine along with the winemaking process. Edwards is an avid sports fan and fitness advocate; he is a former rugby player, enjoys running and playing squash, and believes there are similarities between how music and sports affect the community. He was sometimes referred to as "coach" by musicians of the Portland Youth Philharmonic. Edwards has shared that he would want to work at a vineyard or winery, or be a sports radio host or travel correspondent for a publication if he were not a conductor.

== See also ==
- List of people from Swansea
- List of Southern Methodist University people
- List of University of Surrey people
- List of Welsh people
- Music education for young children
- Music of Wales
