= David Hattner =

American music conductor and clarinetist

- Born: Toledo, Ohio, U.S.
- Occupation(s): Clarinetist, conductor
- Known for: Conductor and music director of the Portland Youth Philharmonic

David Hattner is an American professional clarinetist and conductor currently serving as music director of the Portland Youth Philharmonic. Raised in Toledo, Ohio, Hattner attended the Interlochen Arts Camp and Arts Academy, experiences which inspired him to become a professional musician and conductor. He graduated from the Arts Academy in 1986 and enrolled in Northwestern University where he studied clarinet performance under Robert Marcellus. In 1988 he placed second in the International Clarinet Association's Young Artist Competition and was selected to join the American-Soviet Youth Orchestra. He earned a music degree with honors in 1990.

After performing clarinet with and guest conducting several major ensembles, Hattner moved to New York City in 1996 and became principal clarinetist of the Princeton Symphony Orchestra; his Lincoln Center debut occurred later that year. By 2002 Hattner was the music director and clarinetist of Camerata Atlantica. In 2008 he was chosen to be the conductor and music director of the Portland Youth Philharmonic. Since joining the Philharmonic he has debuted with the Oregon Symphony, Oregon Mozart Players and continues to perform clarinet for local ensembles and other projects. Hattner has also participated in multimedia work with silent film both nationally and internationally.

== Education and career ==
David Hattner was born to Louis and Joan Hattner, residents of Toledo, Ohio. His father was not a musician but owned an extensive record collection which included classical music, which influenced David at a young age. Prior to college, Hattner attended the Interlochen Arts Camp in 1980 and from 1982 to 1984. He then spent three years at the Interlochen Arts Academy where he studied with Richard MacDowell and Frank Kowalsky, graduating in 1986. He has stated that his experiences at Interlochen inspired him to become a professional musician and conductor. In the summer of 1987, following his freshman year at Northwestern University where he studied clarinet performance under Robert Marcellus, Hattner was selected to perform at the Spoleto Music Festival in Italy. In 1988 he placed second in the International Clarinet Association's Young Artist Competition and was selected to be a member of the American-Soviet Youth Orchestra. Hattner earned a music degree with honors from Northwestern in 1990. Following his graduation, Hattner returned to Toledo and presented a clarinet recital at the University of Toledo's Center for the Performing Arts.

In 1996 Hattner moved to New York City and became the principal clarinetist of the Princeton Symphony Orchestra. His Lincoln Center debut took place at Alice Tully Hall in November 1996 with the American premiere of Isang Yun's Quintet No. 2 for Clarinet and Strings. He also performed with the Garden State Philharmonic, Long Island Philharmonic, New Jersey Symphony Orchestra, Orpheus Chamber Orchestra, and the Quintet of the Americas. Hattner guest conducted the Oklahoma Chamber Ensemble and Garden State Philharmonic and organized benefit concerts at St. Ignatius of Antioch Church in Manhattan to feed local residents. In 2001, he released The Clarinetist Composer with Albert Tiu. By 2002 Hattner was the music director and clarinetist of Camerata Atlantica, an ensemble he co-founded with Mark Sloss.

Hattner participated in the American Academy of Conducting at the Aspen Music Festival three times (2003, 2005 and 2006); there he studied with Murry Sidlin and David Zinman, the former conductor of the Baltimore Symphony Orchestra. In February 2006 he conducted Richard Einhorn's Voices of Light as the score to Carl Theodor Dreyer's 1928 silent film The Passion of Joan of Arc at the Winter Garden Atrium in Manhattan as part of the World Financial Center's Arts + Events series. Hattner has also guest conducted the Brooklyn Symphony Orchestra, Cincinnati Chamber Orchestra, Ensemble Sospeso, Eugene Symphony, International Contemporary Ensemble, and the Massapequa Philharmonic Orchestra. He has been the principal clarinet with the Cascade Music Festival Orchestra in Bend for two seasons, the Key West Symphony Orchestra, and the New Jersey Opera Theater. In 2010 he became a member of Interlochen's Heritage Society, reserved for people who have chosen to contribute to Interlochen through estate-planning. In May 2010 he served as conductor of the Interlochen Philharmonic during the first two weeks of Interlochen Arts Camp. Hattner made his Oregon Symphony debut in January 2011. He guest conducted the Oregon Mozart Players, an ensemble based in Eugene, in October 2011 as one of three finalists to fill the position of departing music director Glen Cortese. Hattner guest conducted the Oregon State University Wind Ensemble and FearNoMusic in October 2011, followed by the University of Oregon Symphony in November 2011. In April 2012 Hattner conducted and performed clarinet for Promise, an opera by Theresa Koon about the life of Camille Claudel.

=== Portland Youth Philharmonic ===
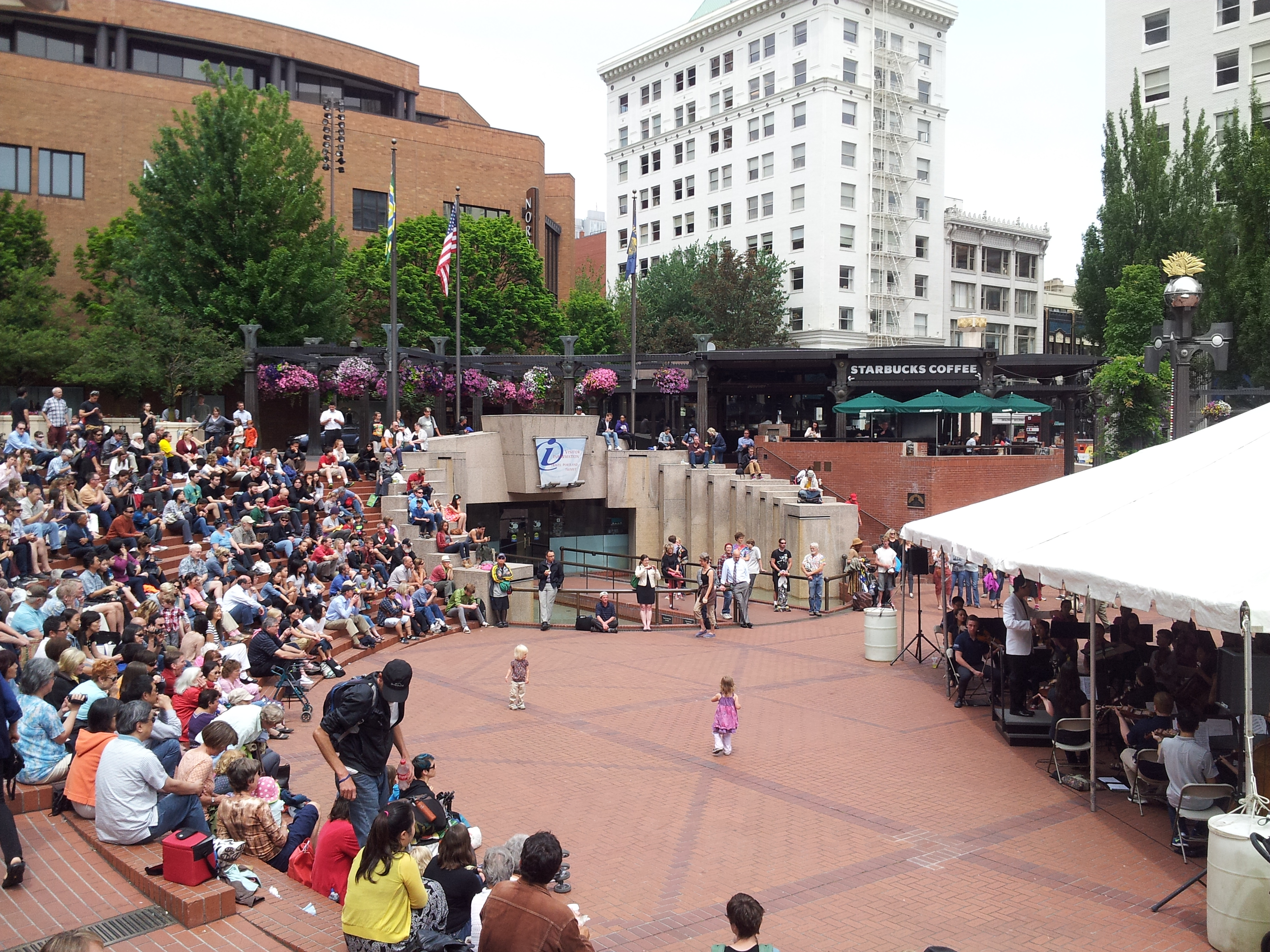
Hattner conducting the orchestra at Pioneer Courthouse Square in 2014

In 2008 Hattner was chosen from a field of 112 candidates to be the conductor and music director of the Portland Youth Philharmonic. In April 2010 the Philharmonic was awarded the Oregon Symphony's Patty Vemer Excellence in Music Education Award, marking the first time the recognition for inspiring students was presented to an organization. Hattner accepted the award on the orchestra's behalf. In order to make use of all musicians in the Philharmonic as often as possible, Hattner often uses Romantic music and symphonies and ballets from the early 20th century in his programs. The Philharmonic began offering chamber orchestra concerts during his tenure.

== Style and interests ==
Hattner has said of his conducting style, "It is generally somewhat of a collaborative process between myself and the musicians, having been a player myself. I'm fairly specific about what I'm asking for in terms of the tempos and the phrasing, but bits of individual expression comes from the hearts and minds of the players themselves. I don't try to micromanage every detail." In addition to conducting and clarinet performance, Hattner has participated in multimedia work with silent film both nationally and internationally. He continues to perform clarinet in ensembles such as 45th Parallel, Martingale Ensemble and other projects.

== See also ==
- List of clarinetists
- List of Northwestern University alumni
- Music education for young children
- Music education in the United States
