= Kenji Bunch =

American classical composer

- Born: Portland, Oregon

Kenji Bunch (born July 27, 1973) is an American composer and violist based in Portland, Oregon. Bunch currently serves as the artistic director of Fear No Music and teaches at Portland State University, Reed College, and for the Portland Youth Philharmonic. He is also the director of MYSfits, the most advanced string ensemble of the Metropolitan Youth Symphony.

Known for "amalgamating traditional American musical forms... and European-based classical music," Bunch's work for chamber ensemble, orchestra and ballet often incorporates elements of hip hop, jazz, bluegrass and funk to critical acclaim. Over sixty American orchestras have performed his music. His film credits include The Bellman Equation and The Argentum Prophecies. His discography includes recordings on Sony/BMG, EMI Classics, Koch, Kleos Classics, RCA, Naxos, Pony Canyon, GENUIN, Capstone, MSR Classics, Innova, ARS, and Crystal labels.

== Education ==
Bunch graduated from Wilson High School (Portland, Oregon) in 1991 having performed in the Portland Youth Philharmonic for five years (1986–1991). He attended The Juilliard School, where he was the first student ever to receive dual Bachelor and Master of Music degrees in viola performance (studying with Toby Appel) and composition (studying with Robert Beaser).

In 1998, Bunch was chosen as a Young Concert Artists’ Composer-in-Residence, selected by a panel of distinguished YCA alumni.

== Concert works and recordings ==
Over sixty American orchestras have performed Bunch's music, which "reache(s) into every section of the orchestra to create an intriguing mixture of sonic colors". As the inaugural Composer in Residence for the Moab Music Festival (2021), Bunch composed Lost Freedom: A Memory in collaboration with and starring actor George Takei as the narrator of his own writings, interwoven with chamber ensemble. Other recent works include commissions from Oregon Symphony (Time In and Aspects of an Elephant), Chamber Music Northwest (Vesper Flight, and Ralph's Old Records), the Philadelphia Chamber Music Society (the still, small voice), Eugene Ballet (The Snow Queen), Seattle Symphony (Groovebox Variations), Traverse City Symphony, MI (Concerto for Piano Left Hand), Peter Britt Festival (Song of Sasquatch), 45th Parallel Universe (Wildflower, and Folie à deux) Lark Quartet (Megalopolis), Grant Park Music Festival (Symphony no. 3: Dream Songs), Music From Angel Fire (Shadowbox), Orchestra Engagement Lab (Embrace for electric violin and orchestra), Chamber Music America (Serenade for Ivy Street Ensemble), Third Angle New Music (Triple Jump), Eastman School of Music (String Quartet no. 2: Concussion Theory for Ying Quartet), American Composers Orchestra (The Devil's Box for viola and orchestra), Brooklyn Friends of Chamber Music (Supermaximum for string orchestra), Colorado, Marin, Winnipeg Symphonies (Piano Concerto), Ahn Trio: “Lullaby For My Favorite Insomniac,” Lenny Kravitz: “It's Time For A Love Revolution,” Joshua Bell: “Musical Gifts from Joshua Bell and Friends.”

All-Bunch concerts have been mounted in New York City, Boston, Denver, Nashville, Mobile, and Portland, as well as at the Perpignon Conservatoire in southern France, the Stamford Festival in England, and The Oranjewoud Festival in The Netherlands. His dance collaborations include work with such choreographers as Toni Pimble, David Parsons, Nai-Ni Chen, Kate Skarpetowska, Paul Vasterling, and Darrell Grand Moultrie. Bunch's film credits include The Bellman Equation and The Argentum Prophecies, and his extensive discography includes recordings on Sony/BMG, EMI Classics, Koch, Kleos Classics, RCA, Naxos, Pony Canyon, GENUIN, Capstone, MSR Classics, Innova, ARS, and Crystal labels.

== Professional activities ==
Bunch served as artistic director of Fear No Music, following a year as interim director of Fear No Music's Young Composers Project in 2013. Known for their programming, "Fear No Music's husband-and-wife leadership team—Artistic Director Kenji Bunch and Executive Director Monica Ohuchi —have spent the past five years making FNM the best kind of Portland hybrid: a classical ensemble with unimpeachable performance credentials, a love for local and contemporary composers, and a mature sense of social justice and responsibility."

Bunch is also the Director of MYSfits, the Metropolitan Youth Symphony's self-conducted string orchestra. Under Bunch's leadership, the group embraces non-traditional, multi-style music from fiddle to funk, and group composition and improvisation.

Bunch teaches viola performance & composition at Portland State University, viola performance at Reed College, and is the Head Music Theory Instructor for the Portland Youth Philharmonic.

== Residencies ==
- 2021: Moab Music Festival
- 2014–present: 45th Parallel
- 2018: American Viola Society
- 2017: Music at Angel Fire (NM)
- 2003, 2005 - 2008: Mobile Symphony (Meet the Composer Music Alive)
- 2007: Sound Encounters New Music Festival, New England Conservatory
- 2006: Spoleto USA Festival
- 2006: Bravo! Vail Music Festival
- 1998 - 2000: Young Concert Artists, Inc.

== Representative works ==
Time In for orchestra (2021)

- commissioned and premiered by the Oregon Symphony as the opening music for their first concert of their 125th Anniversary Season, and the first live performance in 18 months due to the COVID-19 pandemic

Lost Freedom: A Memory for narrator and chamber ensemble (2021)

- commissioned by the Moab Music Festival; premiered by actor and civil rights activist George Takei with Kenji Bunch, Stefan Jackiw, Kristin Lee, Ruben Rengel and Cindy Lu on violin; Cynthia Phelps, viola; Jay Campbell and Tonya Tomkins, cello; Conrad Tao, piano; and Andy Akiho and Ian Rosenbaum on percussion at Red Cliffs Lodge (UT)
- features George Takei's speeches, personal writings, and recollections interwoven by Moab Music Festival Music Director Michael Barrett recalling the period in World War II America when Takei and his family, along with 120,000 other Japanese Americans, were stripped of their property and liberty, and unjustly imprisoned in confinement camps
- the inaugural work in the Moab Music Festival's Commissioning Club

the still small voice for string octet (2020)

- commissioned by the Philadelphia Chamber Music Society; premiered by the Catalyst and Harlem String Quartets at Benjamin Franklin Hall, American Philosophical Society (Philadelphia, PA) in coordination with a voting drive
- based on Walt Whitman's poem Election Day, November, 1884
- made possible by the Chamber Music America Classical Commissioning Program, with generous funding provided by The Andrew W. Mellon Foundation

Aspects of an Elephant for orchestra (2017)

- commissioned and premiered by the Oregon Symphony
- available on "Aspects of America," the Oregon Symphony's 2018 recording of 20th- and 21st-century American orchestral music
- the work depicts the timeless parable of six men who try to discern the traits of an elephant in a pitch-dark room, eventually discovering that only the sum of their perceptions encompasses the full truth

The Snow Queen large ensemble, incidental music for the ballet (2016)

- commissioned by Eugene Ballet and premiered and recorded by Orchestra NEXT (Innova Recordings)
- this full-length ballet is based on the original story by Hans Christian Andersen

Supermaximum for string orchestra (2011) or full orchestra (2013)

- commissioned by Brooklyn Friends of Chamber Music, premiered by East Coast Chamber Orchestra
- inspired by the tradition of chain gang songs from prison camps of the Depression-era South

Concerto for Piano and Orchestra (2011)

- commissioned by The Magnum Opus Project, Kathryn Gould, principal patron, facilitated by Meet The Composer
- premiered by the Colorado Symphony, Jeffrey Kahane, conducting, and Monica Ohuchi, piano

Monica's Notebook performance etudes for solo piano (2010–11)

- premiered by Monica Ohuchi, piano; premiere recording on Helicon Records

String Circle for string quartet (2005)

- commissioned by V.J. Jordan and Chamber Music Amarillo for Joanna Mendoza and the Harrington String Quartet; premiered by the Harrington String Quartet and Kenji Bunch, viola Amarillo Art Museum (TX)

Boiling Point for amplified string quartet, bass, and drumset (2002)

- premiered by The Nurse Kaya String Quartet, the Knitting Factory, NY
- inspired by the disparate influences of comic book graphics, the music of Morton Feldman, and a whistling teakettle
- the music is built in repeated cells, with rock-inflected grooves and dynamics
- the work – performed with a live teakettle on stage – lasts as long as it takes the water to boil

== Discography ==
- "Megalopolis" - Lark Quartet, 2019 (Bridge)
- "Aspects of America" - Oregon Symphony, 2018 (Pentatone)
- "Snow Queen" - Orchestra NEXT, 2017 (Innova Records)
- "Wood and Forest" - Makoto Nakura, 2012 (American Modern Recordings)
- "Journaling" - Cornelius Dufallo, 2012 (Innova Records)
- "Monica's Notebook" - Monica Ohuchi, 2012 (Kleos Classics)
- "Heavy" - Ethel String Quartet, 2012 (Innova Records)
- "Unleashed" - Kenji Bunch, 2011 (Bulging Disc Records)
- "Warning May Cause Mood Swings" - Saint Michael Trio, 2011 (Presentation Partners)
- "Lullaby for my Favorite Insomniac" - Ahn Trio, 2008 (RCA Victor Europe)
- "True" - Ahn Trio, 2008 (Sony BMG)
- "Viola Swirl" - Carol Rodland and Tatevik Mokatsian, 2007 (Crystal Records)
- "Harpsichord Alive, New York City Music" - Elaine Comparone and Queen's Chamber Band, 2007 (Capstone)
- "Works for Viola & Piano" - Naoko Shimizu and Ozgur Aydin, 2004 (Genuin)
- "Groovebox" - Ahn Trio, 2002 (EMI Classics)
- "Works for Violin & Orchestra" - English Chamber Orchestra, 1999 (EMI Classics)

== Critical response ==
According to The Oregonian, Kenji Bunch has won “a reputation as one of the nation's finest and most listener-friendly composers of his generation.”

"Bunch succeeds masterfully... He combines a modernist vocabulary with flourishes of the romantic, with little trace of the avant-garde; old-fashioned ears will drink this music in. Still it's unpredictable enough to delight those who yearn for something new and original... the magical music stands strongly on its own." This quote is excerpted from a Seattle Post-Intelligencer review of Bunch's music for The Snow Queen, a full-length ballet released as a two-CD set from Innova Recordings featuring Brian McWhorter conducting Orchestra Next.

Following the Marin Symphony's performance of Bunch's Piano Concerto featuring soloist Monica Ohuchi, San Francisco Classical Voice wrote, "highly enjoyable music…merging classical and pop music elements into an attractive, relatively unchallenging mix that's in tune with the current eclectic plateau of musical fashion."

== See also ==
- List of Juilliard School people
