= Jennifer Choi =

American violinist

Jennifer Choi is a Korean-American violinist based in New York City. Choi graduated from the Juilliard School and the Oberlin Conservatory of Music and has performed in a variety of settings including solo violin, chamber music, and creative improvisation and performed with the Oregon Symphony, the Portland Columbia Symphony, the Vancouver Symphony Orchestra, the Portland Youth Philharmonic, and the String Orchestra of New York City (SONYC) among others.

== Early life ==
Choi attended Catlin Gabel School in Portland, Oregon.

== Career ==
Choi has collaborated with artists such as Fred Sherry, Stephen Drury, members of the Chamber Music Society of Lincoln Center, the Corigliano and Miró String Quartet, Fireworks New Music Ensemble, the Either/Or Ensemble, and the Sirius Quartet.

In 2011, Choi joined the string quartet ETHEL where she took the place of Mary Rowell.

She has premiered, performed, and recorded works by contemporary composers such as John Zorn, Annie Gosfield, Danielle Eva Schwob, Christian Wolff, Lee Hyla, Neil Rolnick, and Randall Woolf, Elliott Sharp, Richard Carrick, Keeril Makan, Susie Ibarra, and Wadada Leo Smith.

== Discography ==
A stalwart in the NYC contemporary music scene, Jennifer has recorded over a dozen albums for John Zorn's label, TZADIK, as well Innova Recordings and New Focus Recordings.
