= Mei-Ann Chen =

Taiwanese American music conductor (born 1973)

- 陳美安
- Born: 1973 (age 52–53); Kaohsiung, Taiwan
- Education: New England Conservatory of Music (BMus, MMus); University of Michigan (DMA)
- Occupations: Conductor; musician

Mei-Ann Chen (simplified Chinese: 陈美安; traditional Chinese: 陳美安; pinyin: Chén Měi-ān; born 1973) is a Taiwanese-American conductor. She is currently music director of the Chicago Sinfonietta and conductor laureate of the Memphis Symphony Orchestra.

== Early life and education ==
A native of Taiwan, Chen wanted to be a conductor since she was ten years old. At a young age she began playing violin and piano with the support of her parents, and later taught herself to play the trumpet. However, Chen's parents also discouraged her from pursuing conducting as they felt it would be a difficult career path for a woman. She was intrigued with the concept of making elaborate noise, particularly without the use of an instrument. Chen would observe her conductor closely and began to learn how to conduct on her own. She collected batons, believing that "different pieces needed different kinds of batons". Chen left Kaohsiung to study music in Taipei, where she lived with her aunt and was an assistant conductor of her school's chorus.

In 1989, Chen attended a concert in Taipei by the American Youth Orchestra, a touring ensemble of Boston's New England Conservatory. Following the performance, Chen's accompanist escorted her backstage, introduced her to the conductor, and asked if she could play for him. Chen's opportunity came the next morning when she played for conductor Benjamin Zander in a closed basement hotel bar and was offered a scholarship immediately. She performed with the American Youth Orchestra before being invited to attend the Walnut Hill School, a preparatory school linked to the New England Conservatory, two months later at age sixteen. She left her parents, who thought she would study to become a concert violinist, and for more than three years lived with a couple in Boston she referred to as her "American parents" (Mark Churchill and Marylou Speaker Churchill, who was once a member of the Portland Junior Symphony). Chen continued her undergraduate and graduate work at the Conservatory. Speaker taught Chen, who also received violin instruction from James Buswell and Eric Rosenblith as well as conducting supervision from Frank Battisti and Richard Hoenich. Chen became the first person to graduate from the New England Conservatory with a double master's degree in conducting and violin performance and received two honors from the institution: the Chadwick Medal for outstanding undergraduate work, and the Schuller Medal for "extraordinary contribution to musical life in the community". Later in her career, in October 2010, Chen returned to the New England Conservatory to guest conduct the Philharmonia. Chen dedicated the concert to the late Marylou Speaker Churchill, and thanked Benjamin Zander and dean emeritus Mark Churchill for "making her career possible".

Chen remained in Boston for nine years until she attended the University of Michigan to obtain a Doctor of Musical Arts degree in conducting. There she studied with Kenneth Kiesler and Martin Katz, was a music director of the campus orchestras, and also became conductor for the Arbor Opera Theater.

== Career ==
In 2001, Chen was the youngest finalist in the Maazel-Vilar Conductor's Competition in Tokyo. In 2002, Leonard Slatkin invited Chen to conduct the National Symphony at the Kennedy Center in the National Conducting Institute. Chen received a fellowship to study at the Aspen Music Festival and School with David Zinman. The following year the American Symphony Orchestra League (now known as the League of American Orchestras) invited Chen to be showcased at the National Conductor Preview.

=== Portland Youth Philharmonic ===
I pushed [musicians of the Portland Youth Philharmonic] quite hard, but at the same time I was doing that for them, they helped me find my own voice. There is something so genuine about young people making music with their entire heart. Portland took a chance on me and helped me realize my goals. I couldn't have asked for more.

— Chen on her role as conductor of the Philharmonic

Chen became the Portland Youth Philharmonic's (PYP) fourth conductor in 2002 after being selected by a committee of "musically inclined" parents, a member of the orchestra, and representatives of the Oregon Symphony and Portland Opera. She conducted both the Philharmonic ensemble as well as the Conservatory Orchestra. One of the organization's board member's recalled that during her audition Chen very quickly captured the rapport of the orchestra and displayed "wonderful communication skills and genuineness".

During her five-year tenure with the organization, PYP debuted at Carnegie Hall, received its third ASCAP award in 2004 for innovating programming, and began collaborating with the Oregon Symphony (Chen was the ensemble's assistant conductor from 2003 to 2005) and Chamber Music Northwest. In April 2005, Chen became the first woman to win the Malko Competition, the "world's most prestigious prize" for young conductors. She also won the Taki Concordia Fellowship in 2007, an award established by Baltimore Symphony Orchestra music director Marin Alsop to support "promising" female conductors. Chen was presented the Sunburst Award from Young Audiences for her contribution to music education and was named "Educator of the Week" by KKCW.

While conductor of the Philharmonic, Chen set up a box in her office so that students could leave notes for her about themselves. One musician in the orchestra felt that Chen was "kind of formal" during rehearsal but felt "like a big sister" once practice ended. Chen has been described as a "firecracker: small, bright and full of ka-boom", and her enthusiasm at times caused her to lose her breath. One of the organization's board members praised Chen's attitude and felt that her lack of ego was a "rare quality in top symphony performers".

Chen turned down a position with the Oregon Symphony to continue work at PYP, later recalling:

They became my kids, they were no way [sic] for me to give them up. So I made a very unusual decision. I gave up my professional position with the Oregon Symphony, I stayed with the youth orchestra. People thought that I was crazy that I stayed with a youth orchestra instead of pursuing a more professional opportunity. Because I told you my life story, and a youth orchestra changed my life and gave me the chance to fulfill my dreams, I feel working with young musicians is a way for me to give back. It changed my life and I would like to do my part to change other people's lives.

In 2007, she accompanied the orchestra on an international tour to Asia, where her parents saw her conduct for the first time. The Philharmonic offered a total of six performances between June 29 and July 17 in Kaohsiung, Tainan and Taipei, Taiwan as well as in Seoul and Ulsan, South Korea. Though Chen initially thought she would remain with the Philharmonic for ten years, she left in 2007 to become assistant conductor of the Atlanta Symphony. She said of her departure: "The musicians at PYP have become my kids. When I look back, these five years will always be the most memorable time of my musical career." Guest conductors during the 2007–2008 season included Ken Selden, director of orchestral studies at Portland State University, former Seattle Symphony conductor Alastair Willis, along with former PYP conductors Huw Edwards and Chen herself.

=== Baltimore, Memphis, Chicago ===
Chen was the Los Angeles Philharmonic's cover conductor during her tenure with PYP. Following her departure, she became assistant conductor of the Atlanta Symphony for two seasons (2007–2009). In April 2009 Chen withdrew her candidacy for music director of the Lexington Philharmonic Orchestra. Her next role was assistant conductor of the Baltimore Symphony Orchestra for the 2009–2010 season, though she never led a subscription program and mostly conducted programs for children. Both positions were sponsored by the League of American Orchestras.

In February 2010, the Memphis Symphony Orchestra named Chen its music director, effective with the 2010-2011 season, the first woman to hold the post. Chen's three-year tenure began in September 2010. Chen's contract was renewed for an additional three years in 2012, extending her leadership through the 2015–2016 season. During her Memphis tenure, she took up residence in Mud Island, Memphis. Chen concluded her tenure with the orchestra in 2016, and now has the title of conductor laureate of the orchestra.

Chen became music director of the Chicago Sinfonietta on 1 July 2011, with an initial contract of 4 years. Chen has recorded a commercial album with the Sinfonietta released on May 28, 2013, entitled Delights & Dances, on the Çedille label. In May 2014, the Chicago Sinfonietta extended her initial contract through the 2016-2017 season. In May 2016, the orchestra further extended Chen's contract through the 2018-2019 season.

In December 2015, Musical America named Chen one of its 2015 "Top 30 Influencers". Chen was the artistic director and conductor for the 2016 National Taiwan Symphony Orchestra Summer Festival.

In 2019, Chen became principal guest conductor of recreation – Grosses Orchester Graz. In May 2021, the orchestra announced the appointment of Chen as its next principal conductor, effective with the 2021-2022 season. Chen is the first female conductor and the first Asian conductor to be named to this post with recreation – Grosses Orchester Graz.

== See also ==
- List of New England Conservatory people
- List of Taiwanese Americans
- List of University of Michigan arts alumni
- Music education for young children
- Music education in the United States
- Music of Taiwan

Cultural offices
Preceded by David Loebel	Music Director, Memphis Symphony Orchestra; 2010-2016	Succeeded by Robert Moody
Preceded by Paul Freeman	Music Director, Chicago Sinfonietta; 2011-present	Succeeded by incumbent
