= Portland Symphony =

Portland Symphony may refer to:

- Portland Symphony Orchestra, Portland, Maine, United States
- Oregon Symphony, Portland, Oregon, United States, formerly the Portland Symphony Orchestra (to 1967)
- Portland Columbia Symphony, Portland, Oregon
- Portland Youth Philharmonic, Portland, Oregon, formerly the Portland Junior Symphony
