= Albert Tiu =

Filipino pianist (born 1969)

- Born: March 20, 1969 (age 57); Cebu, Philippines
- Origin: Philippines
- Genre: Classical
- Occupations: Concert pianist, music professor and recording artist
- Instrument: Piano
- Labels: Arktos, Decca, Ablaze, Centaur

Albert Tiu (born March 20, 1969) is a classical pianist from the Philippines.

== Biography ==
Born in 1969 in Cebu, Albert first learned to play the piano at the age of five. At the age of eleven, he was accepted at the Philippine High School for the Arts, a government-run school for the musically gifted at the National Arts Center, in Mount Makiling, Laguna.

He studied piano with Nita Quinto at the University of the Philippines College of Music, with John Winther in the Hong Kong Academy for Performing Arts, and with Michael Lewin at the Boston Conservatory. In 1996, he received his Master of Music degree from the Juilliard School, where he was a scholar and student of Jerome Lowenthal.

Between 1996 and 2002, Albert participated in piano competitions, winning First Prizes at the 1996 Unisa Piano Competition in South Africa and the 2000 Web Concert Hall Piano Competition in the U.S. He also won prizes in Calgary (Honens), Helsinki (Maj Lind), Santander (Paloma O'Shea Santander International Competition), and special awards for his performance of Mozart Piano Concerto K595 and the Rachmaninoff's Piano Concerto No. 2 at the Unisa Competition (see list below).

His performance highlights include soloist with the St. Petersburg Philharmonic, Hamburg Symphony, Finnish Radio Symphony, Gstaad Festival Orchestra, Baden-Baden Philharmonic, Northern Sinfonia (England), Calgary Philharmonic, Winnipeg Symphony, Louisiana Philharmonic, Michigan Chamber Symphony, Johannesburg Philharmonic, Cape Town Philharmonic, Guangzhou Symphony, Philippine Philharmonic Orchestra and Juilliard Symphony.

He has settled in Singapore, where he is a Professor at the Yong Siew Toh Conservatory, National University of Singapore.

== Competitions ==
- 1995 St. Charles International Piano Competition in Illinois, USA, First
- 1996 Alabama International Piano Competition, Second
- 1996 Honens International Piano Competition in Calgary, Alberta, Canada, Second
- 1996 UNISA Competition in Pretoria, South Africa, First
- 1998 Paloma O'Shea Santander International Piano Competition in Santander, Spain, Laureate
- 2000 Web Concert Hall Competition, First
- 2002 Maj Lind Piano Competition in Helsinki, Finland, Fifth

== Notable live performances ==
He is noted for his interesting thematic programming, coming up with recital programmes entitled "Nocturnal Fantasies", alternating similarly titled pieces (with similar keys as well) by Chopin and Scriabin; "Bee Flat", featuring the two Sonatas in B-flat (Op.22 and Op.106) by Beethoven; and "Chopin without Chopin", featuring some of Leopold Godowsky's Studies on Chopin's Études, the Skryabin Polonaise and the Busoni and Rachmaninov Variations on the same C-minor Prelude.

As a chamber musician, he has collaborated with violinists Pierre Amoyal, Cho-Liang Lin, Robert McDuffie, Kam Ning and Qian Zhou, violist Nobuko Imai, cellist Li-Wei Qin, the T'ang Quartet, the St. Lawrence Quartet, the Australian String Quartet, and in duo-piano concerts with Thomas Hecht. In January 2005, he and the T'ang Quartet played together in a fund-raising concert at Victoria Concert Hall, Concert for Hope, to aid the victims of the 2004 Indian Ocean Tsunami.

In August 2005, he gave the Singapore premiere of Samuel Barber's Piano Concerto with the Singapore Symphony Orchestra under conductor Tang Muhai at the Esplanade Concert Hall.

In September 2007, after suffering a dislocated left thumb from a bicycle accident, he performed an entire recital with his right hand alone. Albert arranged eight of Chopin preludes for the right hand and played a commissioned piece by Kawai Shiu.

== Personal life ==
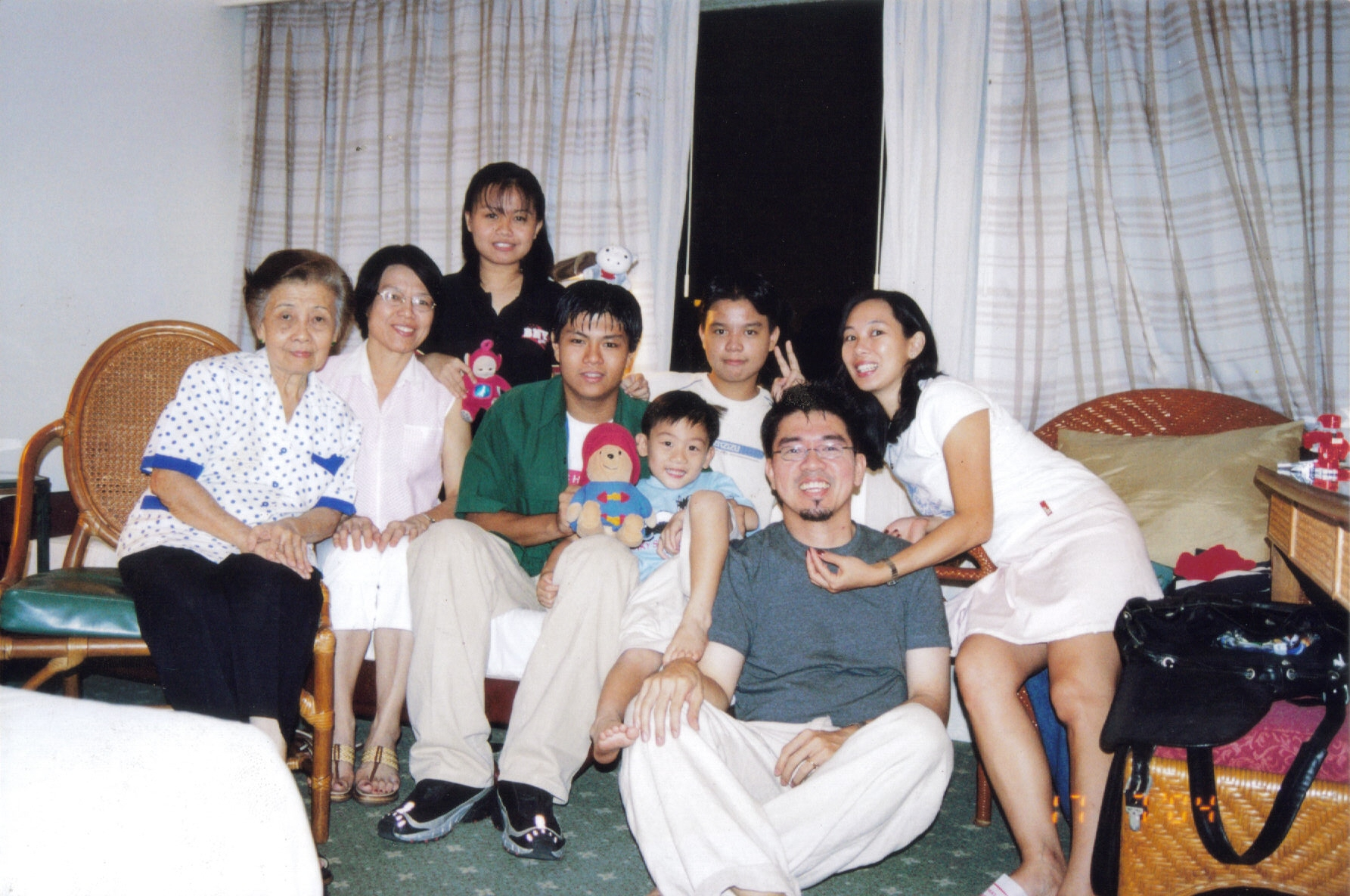
Albert Tiu (foreground) together with his family.

Albert Tiu is married to his wife Susan, and they have two children, Alexander and Lauren.

== Discography ==
1. Sentimyento [Sentiment] (2000), with Joseph Esmilla on the violin assisted by Albert Tiu, Bookmark Audio.
2. The Clarinetist Composer (2001) is a compilation of clarinet music composed by another clarinetist. David Hattner (clarinet) accompanied by Albert Tiu (piano), Northbranch Records.
3. Variations: Albert Tiu, Honens International Piano Competition Laureate Series (2002), Arktos Recordings Limited, Canada.
4. "Salamisim" (Reminiscence) (2002), a collection of short and popular romantic pieces released by Bookmark Audio Philippines.
5. Concierto para trio (2003) is a collection of pieces by Spanish and South American classical composers performed by Triode, a piano trio composed of Albert Tiu (piano), Joseph Esmilla (violin) and Sean Katsuyama (cello), Northbrach Records.
6. Kawai Shiu: unassuming music (2007) is a compilation of music by composer Kawai Shiu with Albert performing "La coral de una mano alberto", a piece for right hand, Ablaze Records.
7. Beethoven: The Cello Sonatas (2010), the five cello sonatas of Beethoven with cellist Li-Wei Qin and Tiu (piano), Decca.
8. Nocturnal Fantasies (2011) is a solo piano collection of works by Chopin and Scriabin, pairing and alternating similar pieces by the two composers, Centaur Records.
9. Rachmaninov: Works for Cello and Piano (2012) includes the Op.2 pieces, the Op.19 Sonata, a transcription by Tiu of the piano Prelude Op.23 No.3, and some songs, with cellist Li-Wei Qin, Decca.

== Reviews ==
- For his 2002 recording on Canadian label Arktos, Variations, the American Record Guide described him as "an artist of uncommon abilities".
- Adam Baer of The New Republic commented, "Tiu plays with this notion in his mind and in his fingers. While he expresses motifs artfully thought out well ahead of performance time, Tiu, like the world's best artists, eventually allows his heart to take over and lets go."
- American Record Guide on "Nocturnal Fantasies", Centaur: "this is one of the most inventive recital programs I have ever seen or heard. Chopin and Scriabin work so well together that I'm surprised that I rarely see them combined on one disc - and never as well as this. He has the heart and soul of a true romantic pianist, as well as an abundance of technical skills. He can float a delicate melody one moment and rise to an impressive and exciting climax the next. His writing, based on superb program notes, supports his program-building ability quite nicely. He is a pianist I would go out of my way to hear in concert, and I will look for his future recordings."
- Gramophone describes "Nocturnal Fantasies" as "performances where heart and mind unite in a deeply affecting union. Tiu is the sort of artist... who can make a single note or chord tell, yet always within an enviably natural, lucid and refined context."
- In Fanfare, Jerry Dubins declared: "Centaur has produced, in my opinion, one of the all-time great piano recordings."
