= Vilem Sokol =

Czech-American conductor (1915–2011)

Vilem Sokol at 90

Vilem Sokol (May 22, 1915 – August 19, 2011) was a Czech-American conductor and professor of music at the University of Washington from 1948 to 1985.

He served as the conductor of the Seattle Youth Symphony Orchestras from 1960 to 1988, The youth symphony performed Mahler's 10th Symphony, a rare event at the time. He made several LPs with the orchestra.

Sokol served as principal violist of the Seattle Symphony from 1959 to 1963. He was the featured soloist with the Seattle Symphony for subscription concerts held March 7 and 8, 1960, performing Harold in Italy by Hector Berlioz.

== Biography ==
Sokol was raised in Ambridge, Pennsylvania. At the age of 16, he studied with Otakar Ševčík in Boston. He received a bachelor's degree in music from Oberlin College in 1938, where he studied violin with Raymond Cerf, and studied for one year on scholarship with Jaroslav Kocián at the State Conservatory of Music in Prague. He studied under a fellowship grant at the Juilliard School in New York City.

Upon his return from Prague, he taught at Shorter College in Rome, Georgia for two years. He returned in 1941 to Oberlin College to pursue graduate work but was drafted when the United States entered the Second World War. He served in Miami Beach, Florida, Lincoln, Nebraska and Biloxi, Mississippi. Following his discharge in 1945, he returned to Oberlin College to continue his graduate work. Before coming to Seattle, he taught at the University of Kentucky (1946–47) and, in 1947–48, at the University of Missouri–Kansas City.

Sokol was one of the first American teachers to meet Shinichi Suzuki and apply aspects of his teaching method.

On August 19, 2011, Sokol died, aged 96, in Seattle, Washington from cancer. He was married to Agatha (née Hoeschele from 1945 until her death in 1998 and they had ten children. Their eldest child Mark was the first violinist of the Concord String Quartet. Two of their daughters have played violin in professional orchestras: Mary, who is in the Vancouver Symphony Orchestra, and Paula, who was in the Minnesota Orchestra and Vancouver Symphony, along with the Kalamazoo Symphony Orchestra, where she was Associate Concertmaster.

== Films ==
- 1974 – 1812 Overture filmed at Pacific Northwest Music Camp at Fort Flagler State Park, director Bill Fertik.
- 1984 – Alan Hovhaness. Directed by Jean Walkinshaw, KCTS-TV, Seattle
