= Quintet of the Americas =

Quintet of the Americas is a wind quintet, established in Bogotá in 1976 and based in New York City since 1979. They have performed concerts throughout the Americas and Eastern Europe, and have recorded eight CDs.

== Members ==
- Karla Moe, Flute
- Benjamin Baron, Clarinet
- Matt Sullivan, Oboe
- Barbara Oldham, Horn
- Sasha Gee Enegren, Bassoon

== History ==
Quintet of the Americas (QOA) have performed recitals; at Carnegie Hall, including the débuts of three commissions for quintet with orchestra in the Carnegie Hall American Music Week Series at Weill Recital Hall; Chamber Music Northwest; Pan American Music Festivals at the Library of Congress and the O.A.S.; two Lincoln Center Out-of-Doors Festivals; retrospective concerts for Karel Husa, David del Tredici, and Ursula Mamlok; and contemporary music concerts for the American Composers Orchestra's Sonidos de Mexico and Sonidos de Cuba festivals.

Working with community organizations to bring new music and composers to audiences in community spaces, the Quintet has performed in outreach programs through: Carnegie Hall Neighborhood Concerts; Chamber Music Society of Lincoln Center; the 92nd Street Y; and Midori and Friends.

The Quintet has received five Chamber Music America Residency Program Grants – (1994–95, 1995–96, 1996–97, all in Chicago) sponsored by the Lila Wallace Reader’s Digest Foundation. The Quintet has also held residencies at: Austin Peay State University, Northwestern University, Americas Society, New York University and Hunter College in the United States; the Kharkiv Special Secondary Music School in the Ukraine; and the Conservatory of Music in the Republic of Georgia.

== Awards and recognition ==
- 2003 Jerome Composers Commissioning Program grant for commissioning Robert Paterson
- 2002 NEA/Chamber Music America Special Commissioning Award to commission and tour Vision III for quintet, electronics and 32 folk instruments, by Judith Sainte Croix

== Recordings ==
- Quintet of the Americas Self Portrait (CRI), including compositions by Pauline Oliveros, Lee Hyla, Christopher Culpo and Elliott Sharp
- Discovering the New World (MMC), including compositions by Roberto Sierra, William Thomas McKinley and Ilan Rechtman
- Never Sing Before Breakfast (Newport Classics), including compositions by Jacob Druckman, Steven Mackey, Jeffrey Wood, Ursula Mamlok. Julia Wolfe and Karel Husa
- XANGO, featuring compositions by Heitor Villa-Lobos
- Dancing in Colombia (MSR)
- Sounds of Brazil, including compositions by Ernesto Nazareth, Pixinguinha and Marcelo Zarvos
- Souvenirs, including compositions by George Gershwin, James P. Johnson, Scott Joplin, and Kid Ory
