= Chicago Sinfonietta =

American orchestra

- Orchestra
- Founded: 1987
- Location: Chicago, Illinois, US
- Concert hall: Symphony Center, Wentz Concert Hall
- Music director: Mei-Ann Chen
- Website: www.chicagosinfonietta.org

The Chicago Sinfonietta is an American orchestra based in Chicago, Illinois.

The orchestra was founded in 1987 under the guidance of conductor and music director Paul Freeman (1936–2015) to address the disconnect between the lack of diversity in orchestras and the vibrant, nuanced, communities in which they play. The orchestra's original mission was a focus on representing the city of Chicago, and representing the vibrancy of the community on stage and in the orchestra's programming. In its first decade, the group made several tours of the United States, Europe, and other overseas destinations. In that time, (1987–1997) guest performers included the Vienna Boys' Choir, Ben Vereen, and Marian McPartland. In its second decade, the group released three new recordings and performed with guests including Poi Dog Pondering, Howard Levy, Rachel Barton Pine, Orbert Davis, and the Apostolic Church of God Choir.

Music director Paul Freeman was the co-host of the National Public Radio program, The Global Maestro and conducted the Czech National Symphony Orchestra. Freeman founded the Chicago Sinfonietta after not finding enough conducting opportunities for African American conductors, instrumentalists and composers. With the announcement of Freeman's planned retirement in 2011, the organization conducted a two-year international search that resulted in the 2010 announcement of international conductor Mei-Ann Chen's appointment as the Sinfonietta's second music director. Freeman's final season culminated with a national broadcast of his final performance on WFMT 98.7 FM that also featured Chen and Renée Baker as co-conductors for the evening. Chen's tenure as music director was formally introduced to the city on August 14, 2011, with a free concert in Millennium Park.

The 2011/2012 season was the first under the baton of Mei-Ann Chen.

The Chicago Sinfonietta celebrated its 30th anniversary season by honoring its mission and roots of diversity and inclusion with the Project W: Works By Diverse Women Composers album. This album is the culmination "of a year-long initiative centered around the recognition of contemporary, diverse women composers." As explained inside the front cover of the album, there is a lack of representation of women as conductors and music directors in major orchestral organizations, with a 10:1 ratio of men to women in music director positions and 4:1 for conductors. With Mei-Ann Chen as conductor, the Chicago Sinfonietta has a musician ratio closer to 50:50.

The orchestra is based in Illinois's cultural center, with homes in two of the Chicago area's foremost destinations for classical music: at Symphony Center, the 116-year-old historical landmark housing the 2,522-seat Orchestra Hall in downtown Chicago, and Wentz Concert Hal, a 617-seat venue opened in 2008 on the campus of North Central College in the Fine Arts Center, located at Chicago Avenue and Ellsworth Street in downtown Naperville, in Chicago's western suburbs. The Chicago Sinfonietta was also the orchestra-in-residence at Dominican University for 24 years. The orchestra has also performed with the Joffrey Ballet, and at the Harris Theater for Music and Dance.

On May 7, 2026, the organization announced a pause of the orchestra's activities after the end of the 2025–2026 season and a planned resumption of activity during 2027, the 40th anniversary of the orchestra's founding. Due to financial challenges, this pause will include a major reduction of the orchestra's support staff. In addition, the news raises future income uncertainty for the musicians and concern about the orchesta's ability to support a diversity of musicians, composers and audiences.

== Honors and awards ==
Recognitions of the orchestra include a 2020 League of American Orchestras Catalyst Award for institutional development and enhancement of diversity in orchestra musicians and management; a 2016 MacArthur Award for Creative, Effective Institutions – their award for non-profits; an ASCAP Award for Adventurous Programming; and a First Place Award for Programming of Contemporary Music.
