= Sergiu Luca =

Romanian-born American violinist

Sergiu Luca (4 April 1943, in Bucharest – 6 December 2010, in Houston) was a Romanian-born American violinist, renowned as an early music pioneer; during his career he performed and recorded on both baroque and modern violins.

== Biography ==
Sergiu Luca was born in Bucharest, Romania, but his family moved to Israel at his age of 7, and as a 9 year old he debuted with the Haifa Symphony Orchestra. Before going to the United States to study at the Curtis Institute with Ivan Galamian, he studied in London and Switzerland.

His American debut was Sibelius's Violin Concerto with the Philadelphia Orchestra in 1965, on which occasion he was chosen by Leonard Bernstein to play its first movement with him conducting the New York Philharmonic later that year. During his career he recorded J. S. Bach's entire oeuvre for solo violin, the Brandenburg Concertos (with Pablo Casals), and a portion of the romantic and 20th-century repertoire.

In 1971 he launched the Chamber Music Northwest festival in Portland, Oregon, in 1983 he took the direction of Houston's Texas Chamber Orchestra which he held until 1986 when he founded the Cascade Head Music Festival on the Oregon Coast, in 1988 he founded Da Camera Society of Houston. He was one of the founders of the Context chamber group. From 1983 until his death he was a professor in the Shepherd School of Music at Rice University.

He died of cholangiocarcinoma in Houston, Texas, at the age of 67. He survived by his wife, Susan Archibald and their daughter, Lily Luca (born in 2006).
