= Sarah Willis (hornist) =

British hornist (born 1969)

Sarah Willis MBE
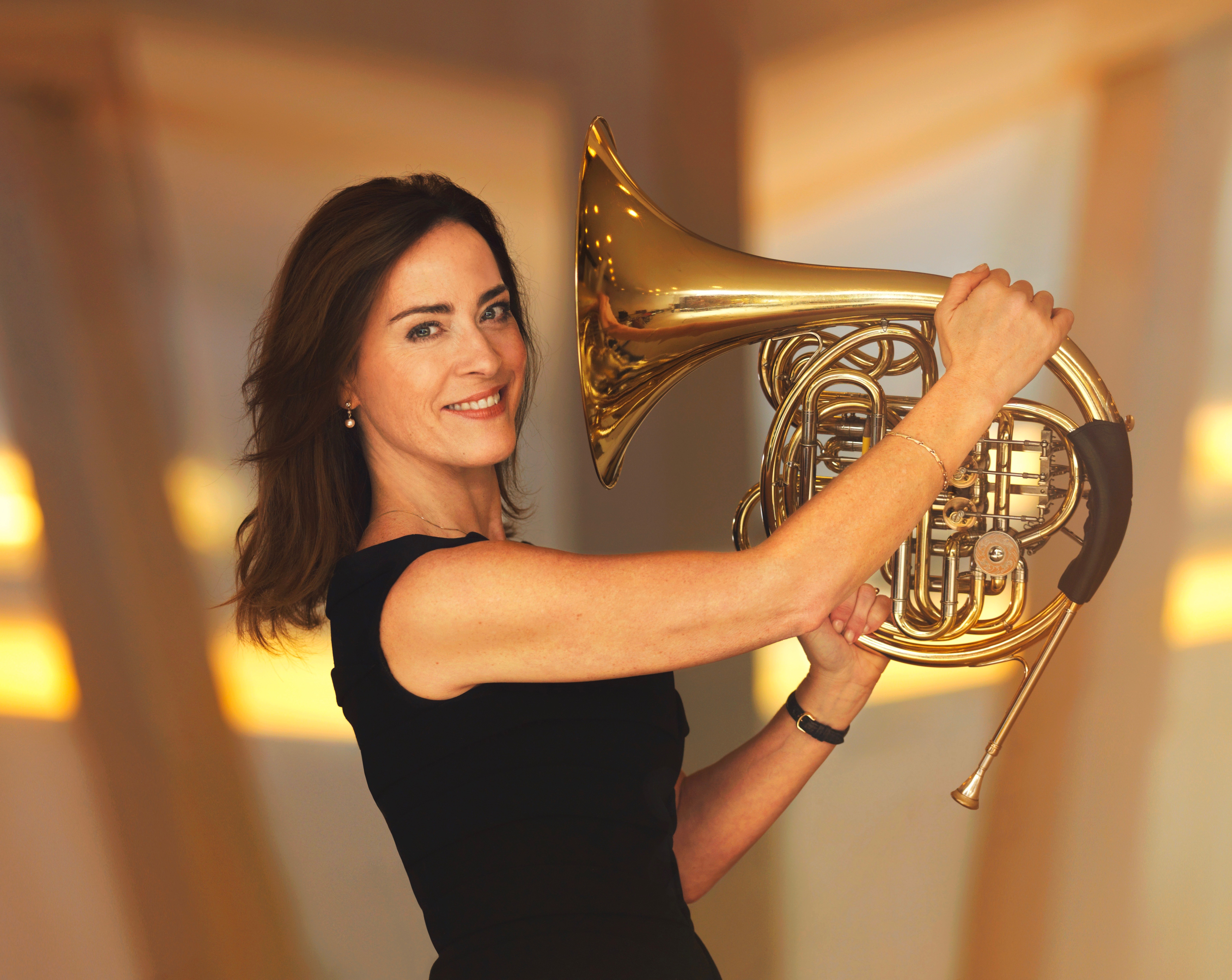

Background information
- Born: Sarah Elizabeth Peel Willis; 23 February 1968 (age 58); Bethesda, Maryland, U.S.
- Occupations: Musician, TV presenter
- Instrument: French horn
- Website: sarah-willis.com

YouTube information
- Channel: Sarah Willis
- Views: 17 million
- Last updated: 11 November 2024

Sarah Elizabeth Peel Willis MBE (born 23 February 1968) is an American-born British-American French horn player. She is a member of the Berlin Philharmonic, and is a presenter of TV and online programs about classical music.

== Early life ==
Sarah Willis was born in Bethesda, Maryland, United States, and grew up in Tokyo, Boston, Moscow, and London. She started playing the French horn at age 14, and attended the Royal College of Music Junior Department. She later joined the Guildhall School of Music and Drama, where she studied with Anthony Halstead and Jeff Bryant. Moving to Berlin, she studied with Fergus McWilliam.

Willis is the sister of Alastair Willis, a Grammy-nominated conductor and music director of the South Bend Symphony Orchestra.

== Career ==
In 1991, Sarah Willis took the position as second horn with the Berlin State Opera under Daniel Barenboim. She joined the Berlin Philharmonic in 2001, under Simon Rattle, becoming the first female brass player. She has performed with a number of orchestras, including the Chicago Symphony, the London Symphony Orchestra, and the Sydney Symphony Orchestra. She also regularly performs with chamber music ensembles.

Willis is a presenter on the German TV station Deutsche Welle, where she hosts a program entitled "Sarah’s Music". She also interviews soloists and conductors for the Berlin Philharmonic's Digital Concert Hall, and was a mentor and presenter for the YouTube Symphony Orchestra 2011, in Sydney. She works with Zukunft@BPhil, the Berlin Philharmonic's education programme, where she creates and presents family concerts.

Willis is the host of the regular online series Horn Hangouts, which are streamed live on her website and archived on her YouTube channel. The series includes interviews with famous musicians, as well as tips on playing the instrument. She credits the series with helping to create an online community of horn players around the world. Willis has recorded a number of CDs as member of the Berlin Philharmonic, as soloist, and as part of chamber ensembles.

Willis worked and co-created an album called "Mozart y Mambo" with the Havana Lyceum Orchestra, which is "a chamber orchestra made up of young and talented Cuban musicians and their Cuban conductor José Antonio Méndez Padrón (Pepe), and also well-known musicians from the Cuban popular music scene." It features famous French Horn solos written by Wolfgang Amadeus Mozart but with a Cuban twist.

Willis was appointed Member of the Order of the British Empire (MBE) in the 2021 Birthday Honours for services to charity and the promotion of classical music.

== Awards ==
- 2026 Opus Klassik Instrumentalist of the Year
