= Aaron Avshalomov =

Russian-Jewish composer (1894–1965)

- Born: Ааро́н Авшало́мов; November 11, 1894; Nikolayevsk-on-Amur, Primorskaya Oblast, Russian Empire
- Died: April 16, 1965 (aged 70); New York City, United States
- Occupation: composer
- Known for: Conducted the Shanghai Municipal Orchestra; Wrote the Opera Kuan Yin

Aaron Avshalomov (Russian: Ааро́н Авшало́мов; 11 November 1894 – 16 April 1965) was a Russian-born Jewish composer. His work included several ballets, two operas, a violin concerto, four symphonies and a flute concerto.

== Early life ==
Born into a Mountain Jewish family in Nikolayevsk-on-Amur, Russia, Avshalomov was sent for medical studies to Zürich. After the October Revolution in 1917, which made further studies in Europe impossible, his family sent him to the United States.

== Career ==
Less than a year later, he chose to move to China, where he entered the world of Shanghai's academia and, together with other Jewish musicians, who had fled the Russian pogroms and revolution, trained a number of young Chinese musicians in classical music, who in turn became leading musicians in contemporary China. Between 1918 and 1947, he worked to create a synthesis of Chinese musical elements and Western techniques of orchestral composition. Among the first works of this type that he created was the opera Kuan Yin, which premiered in Peking in 1925. In the spring of 1935, at the invitation of He Luting, he orchestrated the newly composed March of the Volunteers by Nie Er for the film Children of Troubled Times (1935), making him the first to orchestrate what would become the national anthem of the People's Republic of China.

Avshalomov made his main livelihood at bookstores and libraries. He was the head librarian of the Public Library, Shanghai Municipal Council for 15 years from 1928 until 1943 when the Municipal Council was dissolved. He conducted the Shanghai Municipal Orchestra from 1943 to 1946.

In 1947, he moved to the United States, where he already had spent three years in the mid-1920s.

=== Compositions ===
- Kuan Yin (opera named after Guanyin, the bodhisattva of compassion; premiered in Peking in 1925)
- The Twilight Hour of Yan Kuei Fei (opera, 1933), presumably after the 1923 eponymous book by A. E. Grantham.
- The Great Wall (opera, 1933–41), based on the legend of Lady Meng Jiang.
- Piano Concerto in G on Chinese Themes and Rhythms (1935)
- Flute Concerto
- Violin Concerto
- Symphony No. 1
- Symphony No. 2 (1949, commissioned by Serge Koussevitzky, premiered by the Cincinnati Sym, conducted by Thor Johnson)
- Symphony No. 3 (1953, "To the Memory of Serge and Natalie Koussevitzky")
- Dream of Wei Lin (1949)
- Soul of the Ch'in
- Hutongs of Peking
- Four Biblical Tableaux (Queen Esther's Prayer, Rebecca by the Well, Ruth and Naomi, Processional)

== Family ==
While living in San Francisco, he married a fellow Russian émigré in San Francisco. In 1919, his son, Jacob Avshalomov was born, who became a composer and conductor, too.

== Death ==
He died in New York City on April 16, 1965.
