= Metropolitan Youth Symphony =

Youth orchestra in Portland, Oregon, U.S.

- Youth orchestra
- Founded: 1974
- Location: Portland, Oregon, U.S. Hillsboro, Oregon, U.S.
- Music director: Raúl Gómez-Rojas (2016–present); William C. White (2015–2016); Andrés Lopera (2012–2015); Lajos Balogh (1974–2012)
- Website: playmys.org

Sign outside the facility in southeast Portland, Oregon, 2026

Facility in southeast Portland in 2026

Metropolitan Youth Symphony is a youth orchestra based in Portland, Oregon, U.S.A, founded in 1974 by Lajos Balogh with a handful of students. It now consists of 400+ students across fifteen orchestra, band, strings, flute, percussion and jazz ensembles, led by an artistic team of thirteen conductors and directors. It has rehearsal sites in both Portland and Hillsboro, Oregon. MYS accepts young musicians from kindergarten through early college age at all levels of experience.

The current music director of the Metropolitan Youth Symphony is Costa Rican-born conductor and violinist Raúl Gómez-Rojas.

== Ensembles ==
- Portland:
  - Symphony Orchestra, conducted by Raúl Gómez-Rojas
  - Concert Orchestra, conducted by Raúl Gómez-Rojas
  - Sinfonietta Orchestra, conducted by Marian Gutiérrez-Curiel
  - Portland Chamber Strings, conducted by Darian Todd
  - Interlude Orchestra, conducted by Erica Boland
  - Portland Overture Strings, conducted by Darian Todd
  - MYSfits String Ensemble, conducted by Raúl Gómez-Rojas and Kenji Bunch
  - Concert Band, conducted by Ed Protzman
  - Symphonic Wind Ensemble, conducted by Ed Protzman
  - Jazz Ensemble, directed by Chris Shuttleworth
  - Jazz All-Stars, directed by Christopher Brown
- Hillsboro:
  - Hillsboro Camerata, conducted by Kevin A. Lefohn
  - Hillsboro Chamber Strings, conducted by Kevin A. Lefohn
  - Hillsboro Interlude Strings, conducted by David Eby
  - Hillsboro Overture Strings, conducted by Eri Nogueira

== Performances ==
Metropolitan Youth Symphony's Symphony Orchestra performs four concerts each season as part of its Downtown Concert Series, addressing themes like climate change and racial justice. MYS Downtown Series concerts take place at Portland'5 venues such as Newmark Theatre and Arlene Schnitzer Concert Hall. Other MYS ensembles perform across an average of twelve Community Concerts each season at venues throughout the Portland Metropolitan Area. Additionally, MYS ensembles perform at 15 Title 1 schools each year as part of its In-School Concert Outreach Program.

== See also ==
- Culture of Portland, Oregon
- Portland Youth Philharmonic
