= Memphis Symphony Orchestra =

The Memphis Symphony Orchestra is an American orchestra based in Memphis, Tennessee. The orchestra's primary performing venue is the Cannon Center for the Performing Arts.

== History ==
Prior to the formation of the orchestra, classical orchestras had existed in Memphis earlier, such as the Memphis Symphony Society, which was established in 1939 by Burnet C. Tuthill, head of the music department at Southwestern College. The Memphis Symphony Society consisted largely of amateur musicians who offered four or five concerts each season for several years, but ceased to operate before the 1947-48 season. Other organisations which involved amateur musicians in performance of classical music included The Casino Club, the Philharmonic Society, and the Beethoven Club.

In 1953, the Memphis Sinfonietta, a chamber orchestra consisting of 21 musicians, gave its first concert at the Goodwyn Institute, under the direction of cellist Vincent DeFrank, with support from the Memphis Orchestral Society and the Memphis Arts Council. The success of subsequent concerts caused the ensemble to begin performances at the Ellis Auditorium. In 1960, the ensemble received its current name, the Memphis Symphony Orchestra, with DeFrank as its first music director. A Ford Foundation grant received in 1963 helped the orchestra to expand its season and increase its audience base.

DeFrank continued as the orchestra's music director until 1984. Alan Balter succeeded DeFrank as music director in 1984, and held the post until 1998. In 1996, the orchestra vacated its performing venue when the city of Memphis closed its concert hall in order to build a new city-owned performance venue, the Cannon Center for the Performing Arts. Construction of the Cannon Center was delayed, so the orchestra had no permanent home after 1996 until the Cannon Center opened in 2003. David Loebel became music director in 1998, and held the post until 2010. In February 2010, Mei-Ann Chen was named to succeed Loebel, the first woman to be named music director of the orchestra, effective with the 2010–2011 season, with an initial contract of 3 seasons. During her tenure, the orchestra encountered financial pressures that led to a reduction of concert offerings and a 38% pay reduction for the orchestra musicians. Chen concluded her Memphis tenure at the close of the 2015–2016 season.

In October 2015, the orchestra named Robert Moody as its new principal conductor, effective with the 2016–2017 season, with a contract of two seasons, as an interim appointment to allow time for financial stabilisation and a full search for a music director.<. In March 2017, the orchestra announced the elevation of Moody's title to music director, with an initial contract as music director for 6 seasons, effective with the 2017–2018 season. In September 2023, the orchestra announced an extension of Moody's contract as music director through 2032.

== Music directors ==
- Vincent DeFrank (1960–1984)
- Alan Balter (1984–1998)
- David Loebel (1998–2010)
- Mei-Ann Chen (2010–2016)
- Robert Moody (2016–present)
