= Jacob Avshalomov =

Composer and conductor

- Born: March 28, 1919; Tsingtao, China
- Died: April 25, 2013 (aged 94); Portland, Oregon, United States
- Occupations: Composer, conductor, musician
- Spouse: Doris

Jacob Avshalomov (March 28, 1919 – April 25, 2013) was a composer and conductor.

== Early life and education ==
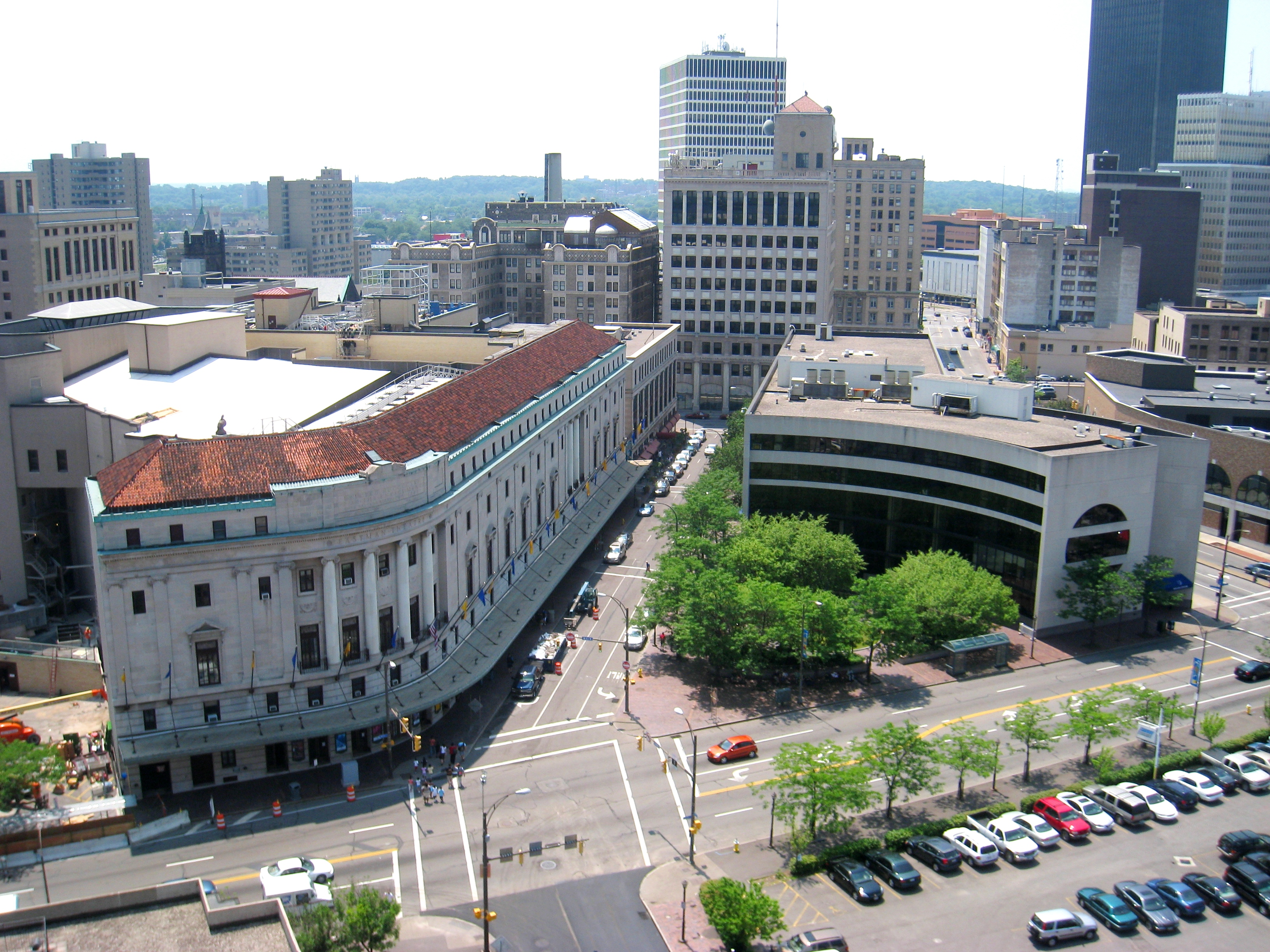
The Eastman School of Music

Jacob Avshalomov was born on March 28, 1919, in Tsingtao, China. His father was Aaron Avshalomov, the Siberian-born composer known for "oriental musical materials cast in western forms and media"; his mother was from San Francisco. Jacob received musical instruction from his father starting at a young age. At eight years old Avshalomov visited Portland from China with his parents and were guests of Jacques Gershkovitch for several months in 1927. Aaron Avshalomov had become friends with Gershkovitch in the Orient (Jacob was three years old when the two met). However, because they did not hold permanent visas the family returned to China.

Avshalomov graduated from British and American schools before age fifteen, then worked as a factory supervisor in Tientsin, Shanghai and Beijing over a span of four years. Avshalomov was also active in sports and won the diving championship of North China. In 1937, Avshalomov assisted his father in Shanghai with ballet production and working on scores. He then enlisted with a British volunteer corps following Japan's invasion of China during the Second Sino-Japanese War, and eventually returned to the United States with his mother in December 1937. Avshalomov spent a year in Los Angeles studying with Ernst Toch, followed by two years in Portland, Oregon to attend Reed College (1939–1941). During this time he studied with Gershkovitch and participated in the Portland Junior Symphony. He then spent two years at the Eastman School of Music to study composition and orchestration with Bernard Rogers. During World War II he lived in London, where he conducted a performance of Johann Sebastian Bach's St John Passion.

== Career ==
Following the war, Avshalomov received the Ditson Fellowship and joined faculty of the music department at Columbia University, where he taught from 1946 to 1954. Here he conducted American premier performances of Anton Bruckner's Mass No. 1 and Michael Tippett's A Child of Our Time. He served on the National Humanities Council from 1968 to 1974 and the Music Planning Section of the National Arts Endowment from 1977 to 1979.

=== Portland Youth Philharmonic ===
Following Gershkovitch's death in 1953, guest conductors lead the Portland Junior Symphony (now known as the Portland Youth Philharmonic) for its thirtieth season—one was Avshalomov. Avshalomov was appointed the orchestra's second conductor in 1954. During his forty-year tenure Avshalomov encouraged international tours and produced several recordings, some of which included pieces commissioned by the orchestra, making the Portland Junior Symphony the first known recording orchestra in the Pacific Northwest. He led the ensemble on their first international tour in 1970. The orchestra became known as the Portland Youth Philharmonic (PYP) in 1978. The year 1984 marked the orchestra's sixtieth anniversary as well as Avshalomov's thirtieth year as conductor. Avshalomov retired in 1995 after an estimated 640 concerts and 10,000 auditions.

== Compositions ==
Avshalomov has composed several symphonic pieces. The cantata "How Long Oh Lord" was recorded by Composers Recordings, Inc. (CRI) in the late 1960s, along with two of his father's works. Other pieces by Avshalomov recorded by CRI are "Phases of the Great Land" (CRI 194), "Inscriptions at the City of Brass" (CRI 117), "The Taking of T'ung Kuan" (CRI 117), and "Prophesy" (CRI 191). Avshalomov also wrote "The Oregon", a symphony commemorating the centennial anniversary of the U.S. state of Oregon, in 1959. One main characteristic of Avshalomov's compositions are the radical change of time-signatures from measure to measure (bar to bar). Other commissioned works include "The Thirteen Clocks", "Glorious th'Assembled Fires", and "Symphony of Songs".

== Recognitions ==
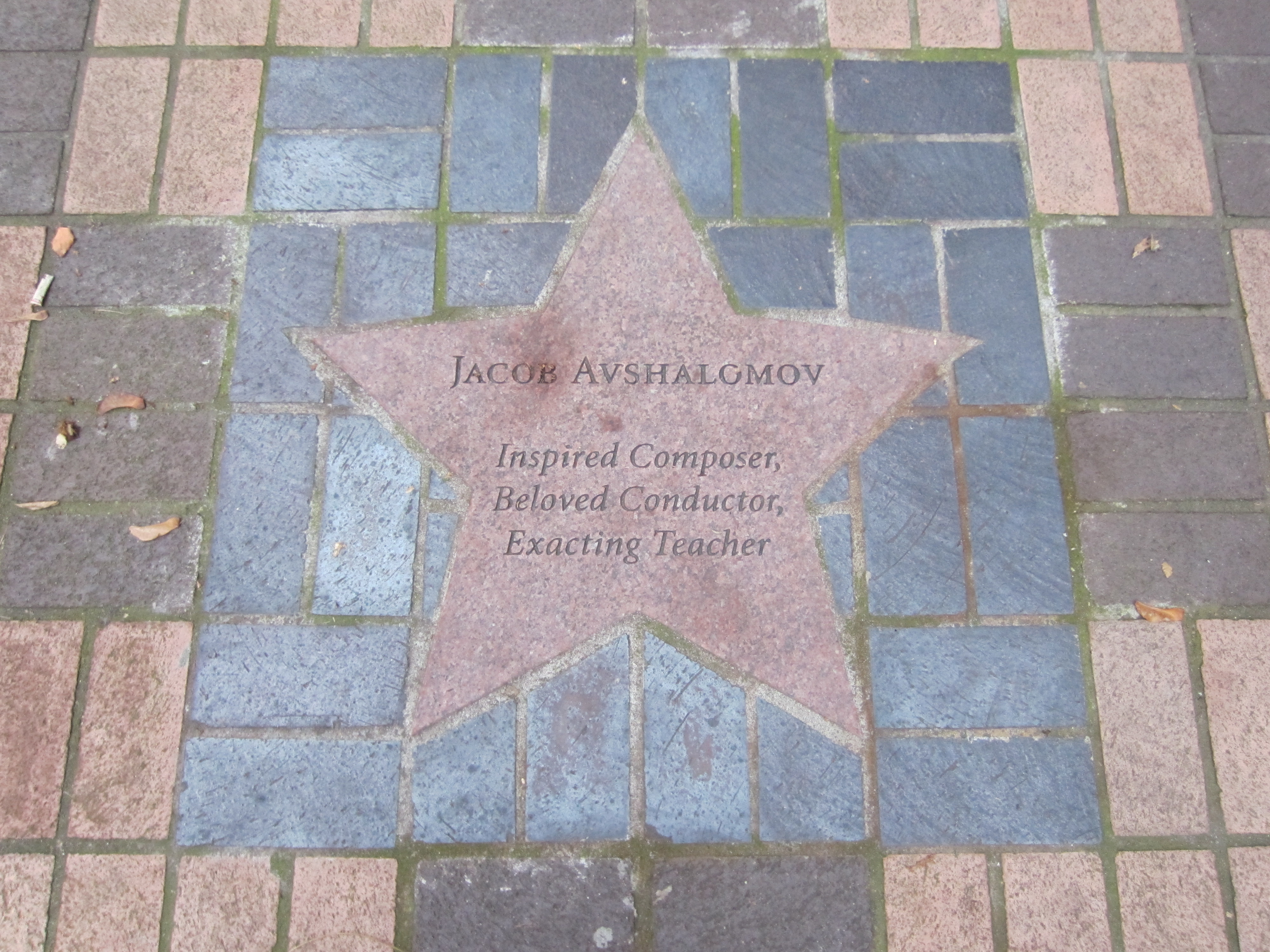
Granite star along Portland's Main Street Walk of Stars recognizing Jacob Avshalomov

Avshalomov received the Ditson Fellowship in Composition following World War II and a Guggenheim Fellowship in 1951. In 1953 he was recognized by the New York Music Critics Circle for his choral work Tom o' Bedlam. Other awards include a Bloch Award, Naumburg Recording Award, Ditson Conductor's Award in 1965, Governor's Arts Award, and American Symphony Orchestra League Award. In 1994 Avshalomov was named a Portland First Citizen, an honor established by the Portland Realty Board (now the Portland Metropolitan Association of Realtors) in 1928 to recognize "civic achievements and business leadership within the community". In 2011 Avshalomov was one of three honorees to be recognized by the Portland Center for the Performing Arts Foundation for outstanding contributions to Portland's art community. Awards recipients had a granite star placed on Main Street by Antoinette Hatfield Hall and were presented with a bronze folly bollard.

== Death ==
He died in his sleep at his Portland, Oregon home in 2013.

== Recordings ==
- Avshalomov: Fabled Cities (1998, Albany), contains re-issues of "City Upon a Hill" (1965), "Inscriptions at the City of Brass" (1957), Symphony: The Oregon and "Up at Timberline" (1987)

== See also ==
- List of Eastman School of Music people
- List of Jewish American composers
- List of Reed College people
- Music education for young children
- Music education in the United States
