= Malko Competition =

International competition for young conductors

The Malko Competition is an international competition for young conductors. It is held every three years by the Danish Radio Symphony Orchestra, to commemorate its founding conductor, Nicolai Malko.

== Recipients ==
| Year | Recipient | Lifetime | Nationality | Notes |
|---|---|---|---|---|
| 1965 | Ralf Weikert | b. 1940 | Austria | |
| 1968 | Avi Ostrowsky | b. 1939 | Israel | |
| 1971 | Winston Dan Vogel | b. 1943 | United States | |
| 1974 | Gotthard Lienicke | | | |
| 1977 | Philip Barry Greenberg | | United States | |
| 1980 | Maximiano Valdés | b. 1949 | Chile | |
| 1983 | Claus Peter Flor | b. 1953 | East Germany | |
| 1986 | Kazufumi Yamashita | b. 1961 | Japan | |
| 1989 | Fabio Mechetti | b. 1957 | Brazil | |
| 1992 | Jin Wang | b. 1960 | Austria | |
| 1995 | Jan Wagner | | Venezuela | |
| 1998 | Seikyo Kim | b. 1970 | Japan | |
| 2001 | Josep Caballé Domenech (Note: No first prize was awarded in 2001, and Caballé-Domenech was appointed the highest (2nd) prize.) | b. 1973 | Spain | |
| 2005 | Mei-Ann Chen | b. 1973 | United States | |
| 2009 | Joshua Weilerstein | b. 1987 | United States | |
| 2012 | Rafael Payare | b. 1980 | Venezuela | |
| 2015 | Tung-Chieh Chuang | b. 1982 | Taiwan | |
| 2018 | Ryan Bancroft | b. 1989 | United States | |
| 2021 | Dmitry Matvienko | b. 1990 | Belarus | |
| 2024 | Samuel Seungwon Lee | b. 1990 | South Korea | |
