= T'ang Quartet =

Singapore-based classical string quartet

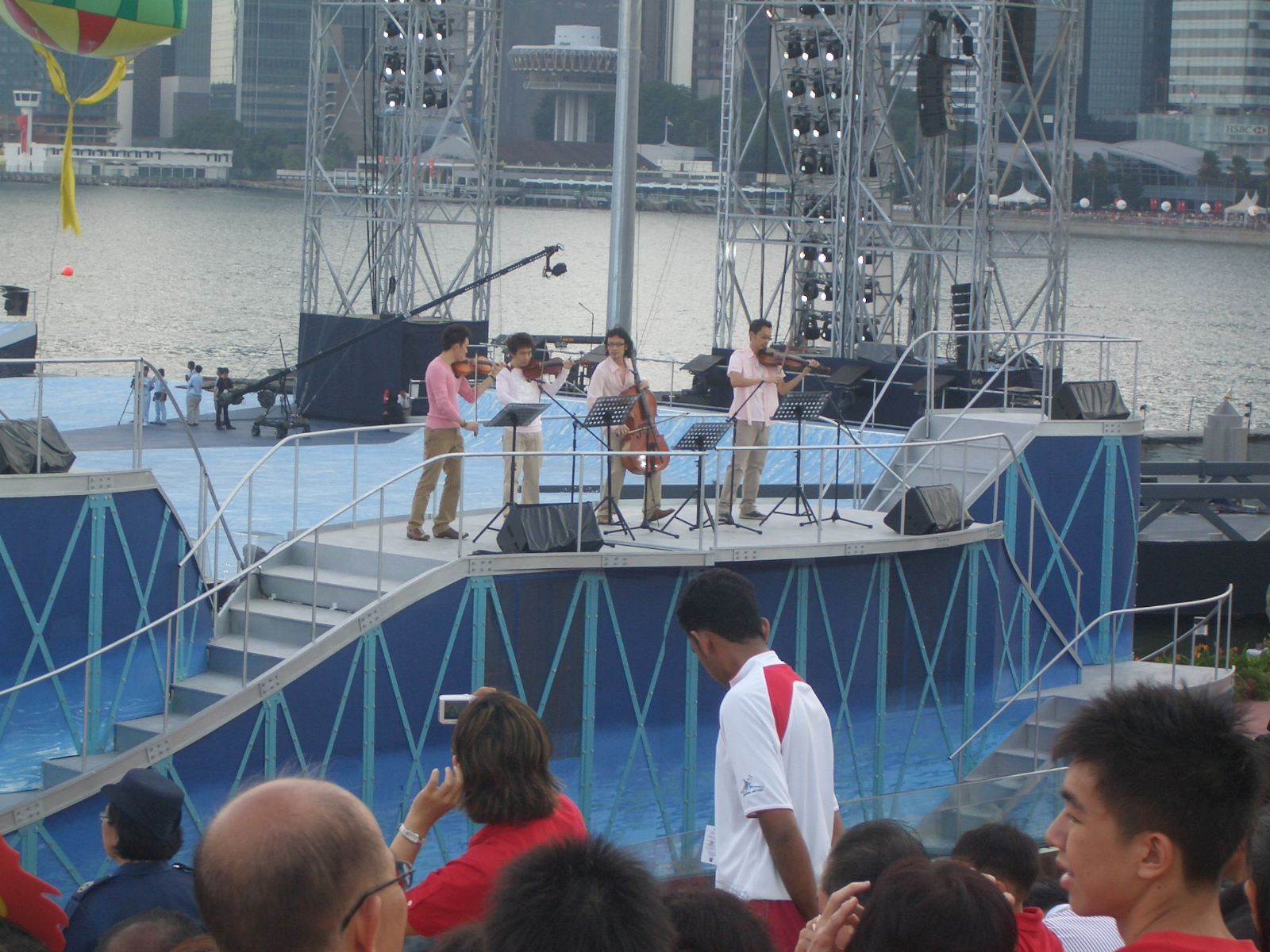
T'ang Quartet performing at NDP 2007

The T'ang String Quartet (唐四重奏) is a Singapore-based classical string quartet that has played to critical acclaim. Formed in 1992, they are Singapore's first full-time professional chamber group. The quartet started with Ang Chek Meng, Ng Yu-Ying and brothers Leslie Tan and Lionel Tan. The Tan brothers left the quartet with Han Oh and Wang Zihao joining the quartet in 2020 and 2021 respectively.

== History ==
Ang Chek Meng, Ng Yu-Ying, brothers Leslie Tan and Lionel Tan, met each other in the Singapore Youth Orchestra in the 1980s and started playing together at functions as a quartet. In 1992, Ang returned from his musical studies overseas and they decided to form the T'ang Quartet. The name of the quartet was created by combining the surnames of all the members.

In 1997, all four members left the Singapore Symphony Orchestra to concentrate on T'ang Quartet.

The quartet was on the faculty of the Boston University Tanglewood Institute from 2001 to 2005.

In 2004, the quartet started recording their first album. In 2005, they released their first album, The Art Of War, dedicated to two Jewish composers in wartime Czechoslovakia Erwin Schulhoff and Pavel Haas.

In September 2006, it performed at the opening of Singapore Biennale, and to foreign dignitaries at the IMF and World Bank Annual Meetings held in Singapore.

In 2007, T'ang Quartet premiered "Optical Identity", a collaborative production with Theatre Cryptic (Scotland) was commissioned by the Singapore Arts Festival. The European premiere took place at the Edinburgh International Festival in August, and the production then traveled to the Alicante International Contemporary Music Festival (Spain) in September, and tours Scotland in October and November 2007.

In 2020, Han oh joined the quartet with Wang Zihao joining in 2021.

In April 2022, the quartet opened their 30th Anniversary celebrations with a rousing performance at Victoria Concert Hall. The concert, Humble Beginnings, also formally introduced their new members, Han Oh (viola) and Wang Zihao (cello). The quartet's new incarnation made its debut with contrasting string quartets by Joseph Haydn and Alexander Borodin to no less fanfare.

To commemorate 30 years of music, the T'ang Quartet has lined up a series of programmes in 2022, including the launch of their coffee table book, Tang At 30, which will be released in July. It will be held in conjunction with T'ang Quartet's second edition two-day anniversary programme, Gift of Music, at the Esplanade Recital Studio. The quartet also headlined NAC-ExxonMobil Concert in the Gardens on 30 July at the Singapore Botanic Gardens' Heritage Festival 2022.

The T’ang Quartet is currently the quartet-in-residence at the Yong Siew Toh Conservatory of Music at the National University of Singapore.

== Reception ==
Critics have praised the T’ang Quartet as 'astounding' for its 'confidence', bravura and charisma' (Boston Globe) and for bringing ‘enthusiasm, energy and commitment...to all the music...' (The Times, London). They have added that 'this ensemble is outstanding. Unanimity of attack is uncanny, and intonation and internal balance both impress greatly. These are plainly minds which share a wavelength' (Evening Standard, London).

British strings magazine The Strad praised the Quartet as a "fine-toned, well-balanced, thoughtfully blended ensemble without a weak link – and with an excellent sense of style".

== Members ==
- Ng Yu-Ying (born 1968), 1st violin
- Ang Chek Meng (born 1969), 2nd violin
- Han Oh (born 1974), viola
- Wang Zihao (born 1991), cello

=== Former members ===
- Leslie Tan (born 1964), cello
- Lionel Tan (1965–2026), viola

== Discography ==
=== Live concert recording album ===
- Not Our Debut (T'ang Quartet and International Music Management, 1996)

=== Limited Release album ===
- Heavenly (Action Theatre, 2001)

=== Album ===
- The Art of War (T'ang Quartet Limited, 2005)
- Made in America c.1893 (T'ang Quartet Limited, 2006) – featuring Violist Jiri Heger as guest soloist (Viola Quintet in E-flat, Op.97)
- "The True Sound of Healing" ( Produced by Tan Tock Seng Hospital, Singapore, 2008)

=== Other works ===
- Recorded soundtrack for "Feet Unbound", a feature film retracing the Long March as undertaken by teenage girls, directed by Ng Khee Jin in 2006.
- A short film on " Optical Identity" featuring T'ang Quartet was screened at the Adelaide Film Festival in Feb 2009

== Awards ==
- Special Jury Prize - Second Joseph Joachim International Chamber Music Competition (1999)
- Bartok Prize - Prague-Vienna-Budapest sommer Akademic (2000)
- Cultural Award - Japanese Chamber of Commerce and Industry (2000)
- Singapore Youth Award in Arts and Culture (2002)
- Artistic Excellence Award (Classical) - Composers and Authors Society of Singapore (2008)
