= Robert Marcellus =

- Born: June 1, 1928; Omaha, Nebraska, United States
- Died: March 31, 1996 (aged 67); Evanston, Illinois, United States

Robert Marcellus (June 1, 1928 – March 31, 1996) was an American classical clarinetist and teacher. Marcellus is best known for his long tenure as principal clarinetist of the Cleveland Orchestra.

== Biography ==
Robert Marcellus was born in Omaha, Nebraska, on June 1, 1928. He began his musical studies with piano lessons at the age of four. He took up the clarinet at eleven and began serious study of the instrument at Minneapolis with Earl Handlon of the Minneapolis Symphony Orchestra at twelve.

His family moved to Washington, D.C., in 1944, and in the fall of that year, he started commuting to New York City once a week for lessons with Daniel Bonade, former first clarinetist of the Cleveland and Philadelphia Orchestras. He became second clarinetist of the National Symphony Orchestra in Washington in 1945. In 1946, he enlisted in the Air Force and played in the Air Force Band in Washington for three years. He returned to the second chair in the National Symphony in 1949 and was promoted to first a year later. He remained in this position until he was appointed principal clarinet in the Cleveland Orchestra at the invitation of George Szell in 1953.

Marcellus made his debut as soloist with the Cleveland Orchestra on March 29–31, 1956, when he played Wolfgang Amadeus Mozart's Clarinet Concerto in A major, K. 622. On October 11–13, 1956, he has also played as soloist in other works, including the concerto by Paul Hindemith and the Concerto for Harpsichord, Flute, Oboe, Clarinet, Violin and Cello by Manuel de Falla.

He was principal clarinetist of the Cleveland Orchestra, under George Szell, from 1953 to 1973. During his tenure in Cleveland, he was clarinet department head at the Cleveland Institute of Music. At the height of his performing career in the 1960s, he was much in demand nationally as a soloist. In the summer of 1961, he played Mozart's Clarinet Concerto at the Casals Festival in Puerto Rico.

After his health forced his early retirement from the orchestra, he was professor of clarinet at Northwestern University from 1974 to 1994. His week-long master classes, held each summer from 1974 until 1987, were one of the highlights of his teaching career. Robert Marcellus was the principal conductor of the Interlochen Arts Academy Orchestra in Interlochen, Michigan for the 1978–79 academic year.

He was a National Patron of Delta Omicron, an international professional music fraternity.

Towards the end of his career he lost his sight from diabetic retinitis. He continued to teach, remarking that the event had possibly improved his hearing. At his death he was a beloved and universally respected and admired artist and pedagogue whose conservative and highly disciplined approach to instrumental technique influenced generations of clarinetists.

Robert Marcellus died on March 31, 1996.
