= Brooklyn Symphony Orchestra =

American symphony orchestra

- Orchestra
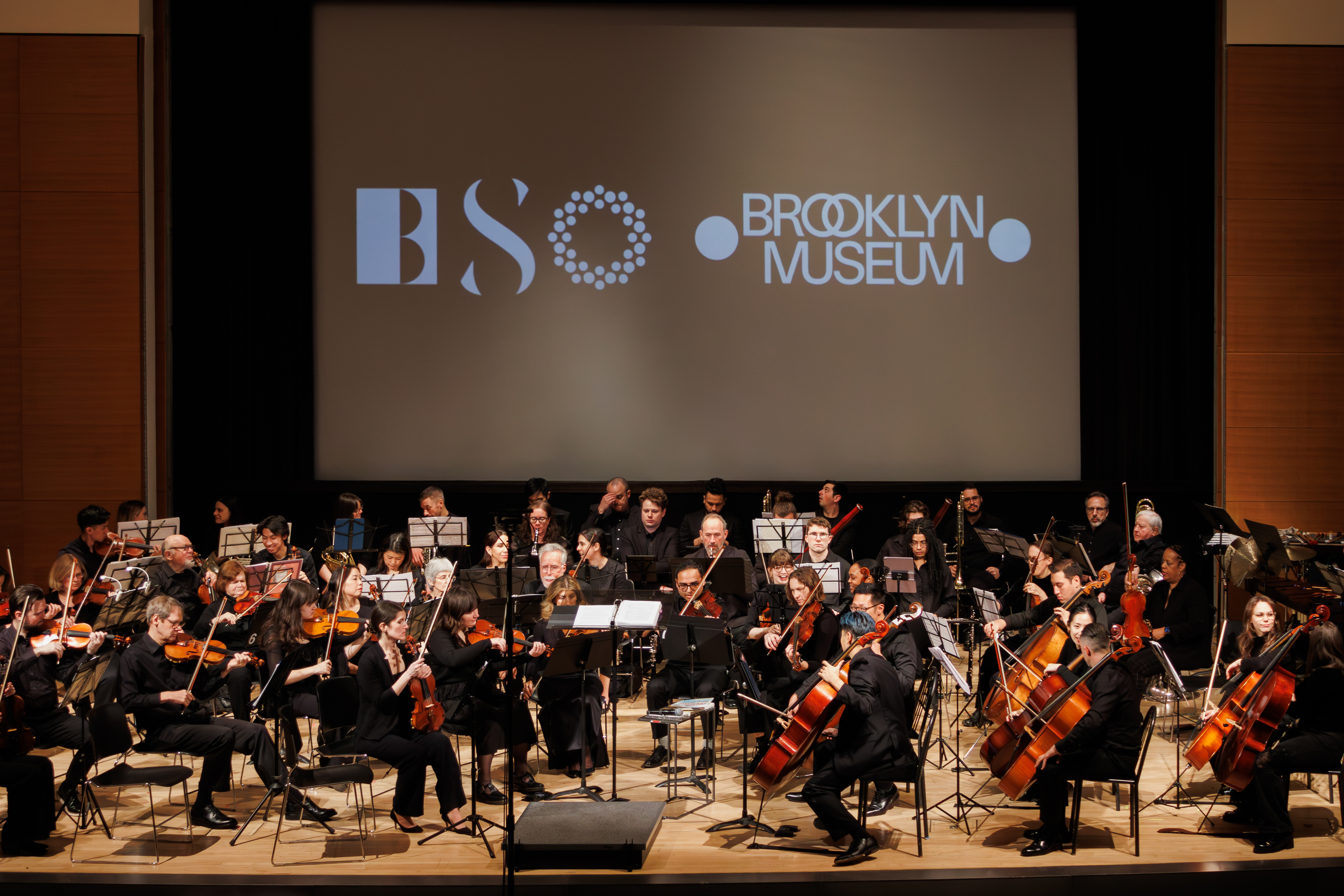
- Short name: BSO
- Founded: 1973; 53 years ago
- Location: New York City, United States
- Concert hall: Cantor Auditorium, Brooklyn Museum
- Website: brooklynsymphonyorchestra.org

The Brooklyn Symphony Orchestra (BSO) is a community orchestra in the New York City metropolitan area. Founded in 1973 under the auspices of the Brooklyn Heights Music Society, the orchestra is composed primarily of volunteer musicians, playing concerts throughout the year at the Brooklyn Museum and other venues in Brooklyn and New York City. The BSO's repertoire spans from the early classics to modern and contemporary works.

Since its founding, the orchestra has been led by six music and artistic directors:

- Gary Berkson, 1974–1976
- David Aurelius, 1976–1978
- Joseph Eger, 1978–1982
- Arturo Delmoni, 1982–1993
- Nicholas Armstrong, 1995–2023
- Felipe Tristán, 2025–2026

For 37 years, the BSO performed at St. Ann's Church in downtown Brooklyn, but in 2014 moved to their current performance space at the Brooklyn Museum. The change was intended to bring classical music to broader audience. From 2001 - 2003, due to a temporary closure at St. Ann's, the orchestra performed concerts at Brooklyn College's Walt Whitman Hall.

Under the baton of Tristán, then serving as the BSO's associate conductor, the BSO embarked to Mexico City in February 2020 for its first international tour, performing concerts at the Castillo de Chapultepec and at the Conservatorio Nacional de Música de México. In February 2024, Tristan and members of the orchestra travelled to Mérida, Mexico, performing with local students and professionals at Palacio de la Música Mexicana.

The Brooklyn Symphony Orchestra is overseen by an all-volunteer board of directors.
