= Portland Columbia Symphony =

- Orchestra
- Former name: Palatine Hill Symphony
- Founded: 1982
- Location: Portland
- Website: www.columbiasymphony.org

The Portland Columbia Symphony is a symphony orchestra based in Portland, Oregon, founded in 1982 as the Palatine Hill Symphony by Jerry Luedders. Then director of the school of music at Lewis & Clark College and conductor of the school's orchestra, Luedders formed the ensemble by recruiting the "best" players from several community orchestras. Rehearsals were originally held at Evans Auditorium on the campus of Lewis & Clark. Luedders served as conductor and music director until 1986.

John Trudeau, then a teacher at Portland State University, became conductor and music director in 1986. The Palatine Hill Symphony was renamed the Portland Columbia Symphony Orchestra when rehearsals were moved from Lewis & Clark College. Trudeau served as conductor and music director for fourteen years, ending in 2000. Huw Edwards held the position for twelve years, from 2000 to 2012.

== History ==
=== Jerry Luedders (1983–1986) ===
Jerry Luedders founded the Portland Columbia Symphony in 1982 as the Palatine Hill Symphony. Luedders, who had moved to Portland in 1977, was then serving as director of the school of music at Lewis & Clark College and conductor of the school's orchestra. He later recalled of the Palatine Hill Symphony's origins that Portland had several "average" community orchestras at the time, but the "best" players from each agreed to join his orchestra while continuing to perform with their respective ensembles. Orchestra rehearsals were held at Evans Auditorium on the campus of Lewis & Clark. The orchestra's first concert was presented in February 1983 and included Johannes Brahms' Tragic Overture. Luedders served as conductor and music director until the summer of 1986. He later returned to conduct the orchestra in celebration of its twenty-fifth and thirtieth anniversaries.

=== John Trudeau (1986–2000) ===
John Trudeau, a teacher at Portland State University, became conductor and music director in 1986. When rehearsals were moved from Lewis & Clark, the Palatine Hill Symphony was renamed the Portland Columbia Symphony. The orchestra's first performance under the conduction of Trudeau included Mozart's Piano Concerto No. 23. Trudeau served as conductor and music director for fourteen years, from 1986 to 2000.

=== Huw Edwards (2000–2012) ===
Huw Edwards began serving as conductor and music director in 2000.

In March 2012, to celebrate its thirtieth anniversary, the orchestra presented a pair of concerts conducted in part by Luedders. Performances were held at First United Methodist Church in Portland and Good Shepherd Community Church in Boring; repertoire included Brahms' Tragic Overture (guest conducted by Luedders, the first piece he conducted with the Palatine Hill Symphony), Mozart's Piano Concerto No. 23 and Shostakovich's Symphony No. 9 (works performed during the first performance conducted by Trudeau), and Ferdinand Hérold's overture to the opéra comique Zampa (the first piece Edwards conducted with the orchestra). In April 2012 Edwards announced his resignation at the end of his twelfth season, citing exhaustion from the commutes between Olympia and Portland as the reason. The orchestra's final performances under Edwards' leadership were held in May 2012 at First United Methodist Church in Portland and the Mt. Hood Community College Theatre in Gresham. Edwards was named conductor emeritus and principal guest conductor and is scheduled to return for the 2012–2013 season finale concert.

The orchestra hired guest conductors for the 2012–2013 season and auditioned five finalist candidates during the 2013–2014 season.

=== Steven Byess (2014–present) ===
Steven Byess was selected as PCSO's next music director and conductor and his inaugural concerts were on September 19–21, 2014. Byess is also the music director of the North Mississippi Symphony Orchestra and the Arkansas Philharmonic Orchestra, associate music director of the Ohio Light Opera, and principal guest conductor of the Sinfonia Chamber Orchestra of Krakow, Poland.

== See also ==
- American classical music
- Culture of Portland, Oregon
- List of symphony orchestras in the United States
- Music of Oregon
