= Seattle Youth Symphony Orchestras =

Seattle Youth Symphony Orchestra
- Youth Orchestra
- Short name: SYSO
- Founded: 1942
- Concert hall: Benaroya Hall, Meany Hall for the Performing Arts
- Website: syso.org

Seattle Youth Symphony Orchestras (SYSO) is the largest youth symphony organization and youth orchestra training program in the United States, as well as the eighth oldest.

== History ==
The Seattle Youth Symphony Orchestra, the organization's oldest orchestra, was founded by the Music and Art Foundation in 1942, and its first conductor was Francis Aranyi. He was an internationally famous violinist who performed with many of the greatest orchestras in Europe, and knew such leading composers as Béla Bartók and Arnold Schoenberg. In 1941 Aranyi came to Seattle as concertmaster of the Seattle Symphony, a position he retained for one season. Although his arrival was concurrent with the hiring of Sir Thomas Beecham as conductor, Aranyi was hired separately and was not chosen for the position by the conductor. During Aranyi's direction of the youth symphony, he built up the group to an orchestra that was nationally recognized. Following establishment of the Little Symphony (now the Seattle Debut Symphony) in 1946, this training orchestra was advertised as "a reserve group for promotion to the major Youth Symphony," and traced its roots to a Preparatory Ensemble which had been established in 1943. The Little Symphony presented its first public concert on June 7, 1947. Thomas Rodrique became its conductor in 1950. Francis Aranyi and Thomas Rodrique were the musical staff of the Youth Symphony Orchestra for the Pacific Northwest, as the organization was then called, until 1959.

Vilem Sokol at 90

For its first two years, it was called the Youth Symphony Orchestra of Seattle. From 1944 to 1963, it was the Youth Symphony Orchestra of the Pacific Northwest. Vilem Sokol led the orchestra for 28 years (1960–1988), and it was under him that the YSO became the fourth orchestra in the United States to perform Gustav Mahler's Tenth Symphony. After the London Symphony Orchestra gave its premiere, the Philadelphia Orchestra, the Chicago Symphony Orchestra, and the San Francisco Symphony had been the only orchestras in the world to have performed the work. Under conductor Sokol, the Seattle Youth Symphony Orchestra made two recordings of Mahler's Tenth Symphony in its entirety.

After Sokol's departure in 1988, the symphony was led by conductors Ruben Gurevich (1988–93) and Jonathan Shames (1994–2001).

SYSO's music director was Dr. Stephen Rogers Radcliffe from 2006 to 2018. In 2019, Juan Felipe Molano became conductor.

== Programs ==
The Carnival of the Animals
A complete recording of Camille Saint-Saëns' The Carnival of the Animals (in fourteen movements) by pianists Neil and Nancy O'Doan and the Seattle Youth Symphony. Conducted by Vilem Sokol.

SYSO-in-the-Schools support public school instrumental music programs by providing instruction in 25 Seattle-area public schools serving over 600 students annually, and the Marrowstone Summer Festival provides learning for over 500 students ages 7 to 25 each summer.

The Academic-Year Orchestra Program serves over 490 students each year through four symphonic orchestras, one string orchestra, and two extracurricular ensembles serving the South Seattle community.

1. The Seattle Youth Symphony Orchestra is the organization's premier ensemble. It comprises the most advanced young musicians and performs professional-level repertoire. It is SYSO's flagship orchestra and one of the leading youth orchestras in the United States. Along with triannual concerts at Benaroya and Meany Halls, the orchestra regularly performs with Pacific Northwest Ballet, the Seattle Opera, regional Broadway Musical Theater organizations, and local choruses and internationally acclaimed guest artists and conductors. It is conducted by Maestro Juan Felipe Molano.
2. The Junior Symphony Orchestra serves as a preparatory ensemble for the Seattle Youth Symphony Orchestra. It offers advanced repertoire and helps develop the skills necessary for the top-tier ensemble. It has been conducted by Dr. Yuchi Chou since the 2023-24 season.
3. The Debut Symphony Orchestra is the intermediate-level full orchestra of SYSO. It provides young musicians with experience in a complete orchestral setting, and introduces them to more complex works and techniques. It is conducted by Bryan Kolk.
4. The Symphonette Orchestra is typically the first full orchestra experience for many young musicians. It combines string musicians with wind, brass, and percussion sections, introducing students to the dynamics of a symphonic orchestra. It is led by Amy Stevenson.
5. The Prelude String Orchestra is the entry-level ensemble for SYSO. Founded in 2016, is composed of young string players and introduces them to orchestral playing. It is conducted by Wesley Hunter.

In 2022, Music Youth Southeast (MYSE) was begun. MYSE is an extracurricular orchestral ensemble that was created in partnership with the community of South Seattle. It is open and tuition-free to musicians grades 6-12 with at least one year of experience. It is conducted by Kim Roy.

Launched in 2023, Cadenza is an after-school program that brings together fourth and fifth graders across Southeast Seattle. These string musicians participate in rehearsals, masterclasses, and concerts, led by Daniel Mullikin, Kim Roy, and Matt Hopper.

SYSO also offers three summer music programs. The Marrowstone Music Festival, hosted by Western Washington University in Bellingham, serves around 185 musicians aged 14–24 with a two-week intensive summer program. Faculty members and guest performers at Marrowstone have included Dale Clevenger, Glenn Dicterow, and Simone Porter^{(external link)}. Up until 2020, two sessions of Marrowstone in the City (MITC) were held in suburbs that surround Seattle, and served over 330 younger players annually.

SYSO and the Seattle Conservatory of Music work with local schools through the Endangered Instruments Program, started by Walter Cole, a project that exposes students to less commonly played instruments including oboe, bassoon, percussion, viola, double bass, tuba, trombone, and horn. The first of its kind in the United States, the program has been emulated in many other cities worldwide, including New York City, Fort Lauderdale, Florida and Vancouver, B.C. EIP partners with 13 Seattle-area public schools to serve over 170 students a year. Participation in the EIP is tuition-free for students who also participate in SYSO's Academic Year Orchestra Program.

Through all of its programs, Seattle Youth Symphony Orchestras serves over 1,100 young musicians each year. Its concerts reach over 14,000, and are replayed over KING-FM to audiences in excess of 200,000.

SYSO regularly receives funding and grants from individuals, foundations, schools, and government agencies. In November 2008, the Seattle Youth Symphony Orchestras received a grant of $500,000 from the Wallace foundation.

== Seattle Conservatory of Music ==
The Seattle Conservatory of Music (SCM) is a program in Seattle Youth Symphony Orchestra. It is targeted toward the more dedicated students of music, who wish to learn more about theory and composition. The SCM consists of Academic Classes (Musicianship, Composition & Music Production, Exploring Creativity & Music, and Collegiate Preparatory), and of Performance Classes (Chamber Music, Single-Instrument/Family Ensembles, Conducting, and Group Drumming).
