= Marrowstone Music Festival =

Marrowstone Music Festival
Background information
Locations	Bellingham, Marrowstone
Years active	1943–2019, 2021–
Dates	July – August
Genre(s)	Classical music (orchestral, chamber)
Venues	Western Washington University, Mount Baker Theatre

The Marrowstone Music Festival is an orchestral training program that takes place in the Pacific Northwest. The program is targeted at high school and college students, around 200 of which play in the program annually.

The festival features orchestral and chamber music, which is performed both by students and faculty members at various concerts during the two-week-long festival.

== History ==
The Marrowstone Music Festival was established by the Music and Art Foundation, which also founded the Seattle Youth Symphony Orchestras. The festival was first held at Camp Sealth on Vashon Island in 1943, and was called the Youth Symphony Orchestra of Seattle Music Camp. The festival has changed locations numerous times since its founding. It first moved to Benbow Lakes in 1945 for one summer, where it adopted the name Pacific Northwest Music Camp, then was held at Camp Waskowitz near North Bend from 1946 to 1948, and from 1950 to 1954. In 1949, the session was a day camp at Hunts Point. In 1955 and 1956, it was held at the Lazy F Ranch near Ellensburg. In 1957, the camp session was held at Pacific Beach, Washington. From 1958 to 1989, the festival was held at Fort Flagler on Marrowstone Island, from which it got its current name in 1976. In 1990, it moved to Fort Worden State Park in Port Townsend. As of 2001, the event has been hosted at Western Washington University.

There was no festival in 2020.

== Programs ==
=== Orchestral music performance ===
The festival consists of two large symphony orchestras and a chamber orchestra in which all students participate. In addition participating students are given the option to participate in one or more other programs at their discretion.

=== Chamber music performance ===
Students may participate in chamber groups throughout the festival. Some of these are formed by the students, while others are organized by the festival. These chamber groups perform in two concerts, one of which takes place during each week of the camp.

=== Master classes ===
Students also have the opportunity to participate in master classes hosted by faculty. Master classes cover miscellaneous topics such as audition preparation, orchestral etiquette, practicing techniques, and instrumental techniques.

=== Piano ===
The festival includes a specific program designed for students whose primary instrument is piano. These students are instructed in solo and group performance by faculty members and are occasionally requested by festival groups as accompaniment or to fill a part required by the music.

== Repertoire ==
The repertoire played by the orchestras are generally considered classical music or orchestral music. Selections in the past have included but were not limited to, Classical Symphony by Sergei Prokofiev, Pines of Rome by Ottorino Respighi, The Planets by Gustav Holst, Carmen Suite by Georges Bizet, and many other classical orchestral works.

== Notable participants ==
=== Faculty ===
- Juan Felipe Molano - Music Director of the Seattle Youth Symphony Orchestra.
- Stephen Rogers Radcliffe - Former Music Director of the Seattle Youth Symphony Orchestra.
- Ryan Dudenbostel - Director of Orchestral Studies at Western Washington University.
- Dale Clevenger - former principal horn player of the Chicago Symphony Orchestra from 1966 to 2013.
- Roger Cole - principal oboist of the Vancouver Symphony Orchestra from 1976 to present. Sessional lecturer at the University of British Columbia.
- Roy Poper - associate professor of trumpet at the Oberlin Conservatory of Music.
- Heidi Lehwalder - renowned as one of the world’s greatest harp prodigies. Multiple appearances with the Seattle Symphony.
- Kenneth Grant - principal clarinetist of the Rochester Philharmonic Orchestra. Faculty at the Eastman School of Music.
- Francine Peterson - freelance bassoonist. Performs with the Seattle Symphony, Pacific Northwest Ballet, and the Seattle Opera. Faculty at the University of Puget Sound, Pacific Lutheran University, and Western Washington University.
- Joseph Rodriguez - second trombone of the Cincinnati Symphony Orchestra.

== Media ==
The orchestral concerts each week of this festival are broadcast by Classical KING-FM shortly after the concerts.

== See also ==
- Seattle Youth Symphony Orchestras
- Orchestras
- Classical music
