= Alastair Willis =

British-American conductor

Alastair Willis is a Grammy-nominated conductor and music director of the South Bend Symphony Orchestra. Willis is the brother of Berlin Philharmonic low horn player Sarah Willis.
