= Chamber Music Northwest =

US non-profit organization

- Formation: 1971
- Founder: Sergiu Luca
- Location: Portland, Oregon, U.S.
- Website: cmnw.org

Chamber Music Northwest (CMNW) is an American non-profit organization in Portland, Oregon, dedicated to the performance and promotion of chamber music. In addition to its annual Summer Festival, the organization also presents individual chamber music concerts throughout the year, as well as educational and community engagement programs.

== History ==
CMNW was founded in 1971 by violinist Sergiu Luca. Clarinetist David Shifrin was the artistic director from 1981 to 2020. He was succeeded by spouses Gloria Chien (piano) and Soovin Kim (violin), who are also the co-artistic directors of the Lake Champlain Chamber Music Festival.

CMNW launched the concert series Protégé Project in 2010.

CMNW is a frequent commissioner of new music, premiering several new works by leading and emerging composers each year. A number of its commissions are available on recordings released by the Delos record label, including Spring Forward (2019) featuring new works by Peter Schickele, Richard Danielpour, and Aaron Jay Kernis, and Clarinet Quartets for Our Time (2019), featuring new works by Valerie Coleman, Chris Rogerson, and David Schiff. The organization regularly features many of the world's greatest chamber music performers and its performances are featured on NPR's Performance Today.

The organization's offices on Southwest Macadam Boulevard burned in January 2018. Sheet music and physical recordings (compact discs, vinyl) were lost in the fire, and CMNW used office space provided by BodyVox Dance temporarily. During the COVID-19 pandemic, CMNW hosted online classes taught by musicians in the ensemble during the pandemic.

=== Summer Festival ===
The organization's main presentation is its annual five-week Summer Festival, that occurs during the months of June and July. Performances are held at the Kaul Auditorium on the campus of Reed College and in Lincoln Hall at Portland State University, as well as other venues. The Oregonian has described Summer Festival as the city's "most ambitious summer classical event", as well as the largest chamber music festival in Oregon.

Performances were streamed online in 2020, during the pandemic; in-person performances resumed in 2021. The theme for the 2023 event was Poetry in Music; the festival featured the world premiere of "Gulistan" ("Flower Garden") by Kian Ravaei and other works by Mozart and Brahms. The 2024 event highlighted Beethoven.

== See also ==
- Culture of Portland, Oregon
