= 2018 in classical music =

This article lists major events and other topics related to classical music in 2018.

== Events ==
- 1 January – Barbara Laister-Ebner performs the zither solo in Tales from the Vienna Woods at the 2018 Vienna New Year's Concert, the first female zither player to do so in the history of the concert. Laister-Ebner also performed with the Vienna Philharmonic in the 30 December 2017 and 31 December 2017 performances of the same programme.
- 2 January – The Paxton Festival announces that Helen Jamieson is to stand down as its artistic director in September 2018.
- 3 January
  - The Irving S. Gilmore International Keyboard Festival and Awards announces Igor Levit as the recipient of the 2018 Gilmore Artist Award.
  - The board of the San Antonio Symphony announces the cancellation of the remaining concerts of the orchestra's 2017–2018 season.
  - The Ojai Festival announces the appointment of Matthias Pintscher as the festival's music director for its 2020 season.
- 5 January – Following her appointment as the new chairwoman of the Symphony Society of San Antonio, Kathleen Weir Vale announces a reversal of the prior 3 January 2018 board decision to suspend the remainder of the orchestra's 2017–2018 season. The previous chair of the organisation, Alice Viroslav, resigned the post on 4 January 2018.
- 8 January
  - Arts Council England announces the appointment of Claire Mera-Nelson as director of Music and as director in its London office.
  - The La Jolla Chamber Music Society announces the resignation of Kristin Lancino as its president, effective 12 January 2018. A news report the same day stated that Cho-Liang Lin is to stand down as the festival's music director in August 2018.
- 10 January
  - The Saarland Minister für Bildung und Kultur announces the appointment of Sébastien Rouland as the next Generalmusikdirektor of the Saarländische Staatstheater, effective with the 2018–2019 season.
  - The Royal Philharmonic Orchestra announces the resignation of Charles Dutoit as its principal conductor and artistic adviser, with immediate effect, following allegations against Dutoit of inappropriate sexual behaviour. Dutoit had previously been scheduled to vacate the posts in 2019.
  - From the Top announces the appointment of Gretchen Nielsen as its first-ever executive director, effective 1 March 2018.
- 11 January
  - Radio France announces the appointment of Martina Batič as the next music director of the Chœur de Radio France, effective 1 September 2018, with an initial contract of 3 years.
  - Sinfonia Viva announces the appointment of Frank Zielhorst as its new principal conductor, with immediate effect.
- 12 January
  - The Symphony Society of San Antonio announces a new agreement with the musicians of the San Antonio Symphony, which allows for restoration of most of the orchestra's remaining 2017–2018 season.
  - The Houston Symphony Orchestra announces the appointment of John Mangum as its next executive director and chief executive officer, effective 16 April 2018.
- 15 January – The Cumnock Tryst announces the appointment of Jean Nicholson as its new festival director.
- 17 January – The Israel Philharmonic Orchestra announces the appointment of Lahav Shani as its next music director, effective with the 2020–2021 season.
- 18 January – The Southbank Centre announces that Jude Kelly is to stand down as its artistic director, effective May 2018.
- 22 January – The Académie des Beaux-Arts announces that Laurent Petitgirard is to conclude his music directorship of the Orchestre Colonne, two years ahead of the original schedule.
- 23 January
  - The Ernst von Siemens Music Foundation announces Beat Furrer as the recipient of the 2018 Ernst von Siemens Music Prize.
  - The Atlanta Symphony Orchestra announces that Robert Spano is to conclude his tenure as its music director at the close of the 2020–2021 season, and subsequently to take the title of conductor laureate.
- 25 January
  - Creative Scotland announces the newest round of Regular Funding recipients for its next three-year programme, which includes the losses of £300,000 for the Dunedin Consort and of £550,000 for the Hebrides Ensemble.
  - The Berlin Philharmonic Orchestra announces the naming of Mariss Jansons as an honorary member of the orchestra.
  - The musicians of the Vermont Symphony Orchestra vote to unionise.
- 26 January – King's College, Cambridge announces that Stephen Cleobury is to retire as its director of music, effective 30 September 2019.
- 29 January
  - Newspaper accounts report that the Australian Broadcasting Corporation intends to dismantle its sound and reference libraries across Australia, with a single library to be retained in Melbourne.
  - The Vienna Radio Symphony Orchestra announces the appointment of Marin Alsop as its next chief conductor, effective 1 September 2019, with an initial contract of 3 years. She is the first female conductor to be named chief conductor of the Vienna RSO.
- 30 January
  - The Léonie Sonning Music Foundation announces Hans Abrahamsen as the recipient of the Léonie Sonning Music Prize 2019.
  - The Orchestre de Paris announces that Daniel Harding is to stand down as its principal conductor, following the close of the 2018–2019 season.
  - The Richmond Symphony announces that Steven Smith is to conclude his tenure as its music director, following the close of the 2018–2019 season.
- 1 February
  - The Buxton Festival announces the appointment of Michael Williams as its next chief executive officer, effective April 2018.
  - The BBC Scottish Symphony Orchestra, under the direction of Martyn Brabbins, gives the first performance of the Symphony in B♭ by Michael Tippett since its 1935 premiere.
  - Austin Opera announces the dismissal of Richard Buckley as its artistic director and principal conductor, with immediate effect, after allegations of harassment of an unspecified nature.
- 6 February – Creative Scotland announces restoration of £300,000 funding for 3 years to the Dunedin Consort.
- 7 February
  - State Opera of South Australia announces the appointments of Yarmila Alfonzetti as its next executive director, and of Stuart Maunder as its next artistic director.
  - The Brooklyn Academy of Music announces the appointment of David Binder as its next artistic director.
- 8 February – The La Jolla Music Society announces the appointment of Inon Barnatan as the next music director of its SummerFest programme, effective with the 2019 summer season.
- 9 February
  - The Symphoniker Hamburg announces the appointment of Sylvain Cambreling as its next chief conductor, effective with the 2018–2019 season.
  - Santa Fe Opera announces the appointments of Robert K. Meya as its next general director and of Alexander Neef as the first-ever artistic director of the company. In addition, Harry Bicket is to be elevated from chief conductor of the company to its music director. All three appointments are scheduled to be effective as of 1 October 2018.
- 11 February – 50 years after its composition, Richard Reason's Dylan Thomas Song Cycle receives its first performance at Conway Hall.
- 13 February
  - The Juilliard School announces the appointment of David Robertson as its next director of conducting studies, effective with the 2018–2019 academic year.
  - The San Diego Symphony announces the appointment of Rafael Payare as its next music director, effective 1 July 2019.
- 14 February – The Winnipeg Symphony Orchestra announces the appointment of Daniel Raiskin as its next music director, effective with the 2018–2019 season.
- 15 February
  - The Centre de musique baroque de Versailles announces the election of Pierre Coppey as its next president.
  - The Metropolitan Opera announces that Yannick Nézet-Séguin is to take the title of music director as of the 2018–2019 season, two seasons earlier than originally announced.
- 19 February – National Sawdust announces Kayla Cashetta, Emma O'Halloran, and X. Lee as the first-ever prize winners of its inaugural Hildegard Competition "for emerging women and non-binary composers".
- 20 February
  - Longborough Festival Opera announces the appointment of Polly Graham, daughter of festival founders Martin and Lizzie Graham, as its new artistic director, with immediate effect.
  - The Juilliard String Quartet announces the appointment of Areta Zhulla as its new first violinist, effective September 2018, replacing Joseph Lin, who is to remain on the Juilliard faculty.
  - The Indianapolis Symphony Orchestra announces the appointment of James M Johnson as its next executive director, effective 30 April 2018.
  - The Omaha Symphony Orchestra announces the resignation of James M Johnson as its executive director, as of the end of April 2018.
  - The Los Angeles Chamber Orchestra announces the appointment of Jaime Martín its next music director, effective with the 2019–2020 season, with an initial contract of 3 years.
- 21 February
  - The Orchestre Philharmonique de Liège announces the appointment of Gergely Madaras as its next music director, effective 1 September 2019, with an initial contract of 3 years.
  - G. Schirmer, Inc. announces its acquisition of the worldwide publishing rights to the works of Julius Eastman.
- 22 February
  - A news report states that Rafael Payare is to stand down as music director of the Ulster Orchestra as of the end of his current contract, at the close of the 2018–2019 season.
  - The Takács Quartet announces the retirement of its violist, Károly Schranz, effective 1 May 2018, and the appointment of Harumi Rhodes as its new violist.
- 1 March
  - The Tasmanian Symphony Orchestra announces that Nicholas Heyward is to stand down as its managing director at the end of the 2017–2018 season.
  - The Dresdner Musikfestspiele announces Joyce DiDonato as the recipient of its annual Prize, for 2018, for her work in music education.
- 6 March – The Bavarian State Opera announces the appointments of Serge Dorny as its next Intendant, and of Vladimir Jurowski as its next Generalmusikdirektor, effective with the 2021–2022 season.
- 7 March – The city of Aachen announces the appointment of Christopher Ward as its next Generalmusikdirektor, effective 1 August 2018.
- 8 March
  - English National Opera announces the appointment of Stuart Murphy as its next chief executive, effective 3 April 2018.
  - Trinity Laban Conservatoire of Music and Dance announces its 'Venus Blazing' programme for the 2018–2019 academic year, with the commitment that music by female composers is to comprise at least 50% of the selections for its public performances.
- 10 March – Paul Plishka sings his final performance with the Metropolitan Opera, his 1,672nd appearance with the company, prior to his retirement.
- 12 March – The Metropolitan Opera announces the full termination of its relationship with its former music director, James Levine, after a 3-month investigation into allegations of sexual misconduct against him. This action includes the rescinding of his title of music director emeritus and dismissal of him as artistic director of its young artists program.
- 14 March – The Royal Society of Musicians announces the appointment of Charlotte Penton-Smith as its first ever chief executive.
- 16 March – A news report indicates that Michael Christie is to conclude his tenure as music director of Minnesota Opera at the close of the 2017–2018 season.
- 20 March – The Badisches Staatstheater Karlsruhe announces the appointment of Nicole Braunger as its new director of opera (Operdirektorin), the first woman to be named to the post, effective with the 2018–2019 season.
- 24 March – Glyndebourne announces the prize winners of its inaugural Glyndebourne Opera Cup competition:
  - Overall winner: Samantha Hankey
  - Second place: Jacquelyn Stucker
  - Third place: Elbenita Kajtazi
  - Ginette Theano prize (for most promising talent): Emily Pogorelc
  - Media prize: Samantha Hankey
  - Audience prize: Elbenita Kajtazi
- 26 March – The Philadelphia Orchestra announces the appointment of Matías Tarnopolsky as its next president and chief executive officer, effective August 2018, with an initial contract of 5 years.
- 27 March – The Santa Rosa Symphony announces the appointment of Francesco Lecce-Chong as its next music director, effective with the 2018–2019 season, with an initial contract of 3 years.
- 28 March
  - The Vienna Symphony Orchestra announces the appointment of Andrés Orozco-Estrada as its next chief conductor, effective with the 2021–2022 season, with an initial contract of 5 years.
  - The High Court of Justice rules in favour of violist Christopher Goldscheier in his lawsuit against the Royal Opera House, Covent Garden, for hearing damage from 'acoustic shock'.
  - The Theater Kiel announces the appointment of Benjamin Reiners as its new Generalmusikdirektor (GMD), effective with the 2019–2020 season.
- 4 April
  - The Royal Philharmonic Society announces the appointment of James Murphy as its next chief executive, effective in the summer of 2018.
  - Kentucky Opera announces that its general director, Ian Derrer, is to stand down from the post in June 2018.
- 5 April
  - The Buxton International Festival announces that its artistic director, Stephen Barlow, is to stand down from the post in late July 2018.
  - The Dallas Opera announces the appointment of Ian Derrer as its next general director and chief executive officer, effective July 2018.
- 6 April
  - Opera Theatre of Saint Louis announces the appointment of Andrew Jorgensen as its next general director, effective 1 July 2018.
  - Debora L. Spar announces her resignation as president of the Lincoln Center for the Performing Arts.
- 10 April – The Melbourne Symphony Orchestra announces that Sir Andrew Davis is to stand down as its chief conductor at the end of December 2019.
- 17 April
  - The Minnesota Orchestra announces the appointment of Michelle Miller Burns as its next president and chief executive officer, effective 1 September 2018.
  - The Virginia Symphony Orchestra announces that JoAnn Falletta is to conclude her tenure as its music director in June 2020.
- 18 April – Walter Vergnano submits his resignation as Intendant of the Teatro Regio of Turin, 15 months ahead of the expiration date of his contract.
- 20 April – The Royal Danish Opera announces the appointment of Kasper Holten as its next director.
- 24 April – The Teatro Regio of Turin announces the nomination of William Graziosi as its next Intendant, in a communication to the Italian Ministry of Culture.
- 25 April – The Bundesverband Musikindustrie announces the discontinuation of its ECHO Awards, after protests at the rap duo Kollegah and Farid Bang receiving an award based on sales numbers for their album Jung, Brutal, Gutaussehend 3, several lyrics from which have been deemed to be anti-Semitic. In protest, several classical music artists have returned their previous ECHO Awards, including Daniel Barenboim, Mariss Jansons, Igor Levit, and Christian Thielemann.
- 26 April – Gianandrea Noseda submits his resignation as music director of the Teatro Regio of Turin.
- 27 April – The 2018 Malko Competition announces its prize winners:
  - 1st prize: Ryan Bancroft
  - 2nd prize: Anna Rakitina
  - 3rd prize: Alessandro Bonato
- 28 April – The Erie Chamber Orchestra performs its final concert before disbanding, after 40 years of existence.
- 30 April – The Toronto Symphony Orchestra announces the appointment of Matthew Loden as its next chief executive officer, effective July 2018.
- 1 May – The Edinburgh International Festival announces the appointment of Aidan Oliver as its next chorus director, effective autumn 2018.
- 2 May – The WDR Symphony Orchestra Cologne announces the appointment of Cristian Măcelaru as its next chief conductor, effective with the 2019–2020 season, with an initial contract of 3 years.
- 8 May – The Salzburg Easter Festival announces that Peter Ruzicka is to stand down as its managing director on 30 June 2020.
- 9 May
  - The Yomiuri Nippon Symphony Orchestra announces the appointment of Sebastian Weigle as its next chief conductor, effective 1 April 2019, with an initial contract of 3 years.
  - The Radio Filharmonisch Orkest (RFO) announces the appointment of Karina Canellakis as its next chief conductor, effective with the 2019–2020 season, with an initial contract of 4 years. The RFO is the first Dutch orchestra ever to name a female conductor as its chief conductor.
  - The Netherlands Philharmonic Orchestra (NedPhO) announces that Marc Albrecht is to conclude his chief conductorship of the NedPhO, the Netherlands Chamber Orchestra, and Dutch National Opera after the close of the 2019–2020 season.
  - The Royal Philharmonic Society announces Jessye Norman as the 105th recipient of the Royal Philharmonic Society Gold Medal.
  - Florentine Opera announces the resignation of William Florescu as its general director, with immediate effect. On 16 May, the company released a further statement that Florescu's resignation was related to allegations of sexual misconduct.
- 10 May – The Fort Worth Symphony Orchestra announces that Miguel Harth-Bedoya is to conclude his music directorship of the orchestra at the close of the 2019–2020 season.
- 12 May – The Chiara String Quartet performs its final concert at the Metropolitan Museum of Art in New York City before disbanding.
- 13 May – Lauren Zhang is announced as the winner of the BBC Young Musician 2018 competition.
- 15 May – The Birgit Nilsson Foundation announces Nina Stemme as the recipient of the 2018 Birgit Nilsson Prize.
- 16 May – The Cleveland Orchestra announces the appointment of Lisa Wong as its director of choruses.
- 17 May
  - The Antwerp Symphony Orchestra announces the appointment of Elim Chan as its next chief conductor, effective with the 2019–2020 season. She is the first female conductor ever to be named to the post.
  - Houston Grand Opera announces the appointment of Eun Sun Kim as its new principal guest conductor, the first female conductor ever named to the post.
- 18 May – Eun Sun Kim conducts the opening concert of the Cincinnati May Festival, the first female conductor ever to conduct at the festival.
- 21 May
  - The Orquesta Sinfónica de Tenerife announces the appointment of Antonio Méndez as its next principal conductor, effective with the 2018–2019 season.
  - The Alexandria Symphony Orchestra announces the appointment of James Ross as its next music director.
- 23 May
  - King's College, Cambridge announces the appointment of Daniel Hyde as its next director of Music, effective 1 October 2019.
  - The Tafelmusik Baroque Orchestra announces the resignation of William Norris as its managing director, effective 4 July 2018.
  - The Solti Foundation U.S. announces Roderick Cox as the recipient of the 2018 Sir Georg Solti Conducting Award.
- 24 May
  - The Theater Regensburg announces the appointment of Chin-Chao Lin as its next Generalmusikdirektor, effective with the 2018–2019 season.
  - The Kansas City Symphony announces that Frank Byrne is to stand down as its executive director on 31 August 2019.
  - The Berkeley Symphony announces that Joana Carneiro is to stand down as its music director at the end of the 2017–2018 season, at which time she is to take the title of music director emerita.
- 25 May – Saint Thomas Church Fifth Avenue announces that Daniel Hyde is to stand down as its director of music in 2019.
- 28 May – The Hochschule für Musik und Darstellende Kunst Frankfurt am Main announces the election of Elmar Fulda as its next president.
- 29 May
  - Ensemble Musikfabrik announces the appointment of Thomas Fichter as its next Intendant (managing director).
  - The Scottish Chamber Orchestra announces the appointment of Maxim Emelyanychev as its next principal conductor, effective with the 2019–2020 season.
- 1 June – The Royal Philharmonic Society (RPS) announces its awarding of honorary membership in the RPS to Stephen Hough, the 141st such recipient in the history of the RPS.
- 4 June – The Dallas Symphony Orchestra announces the appointment of Fabio Luisi as its next music director, effective with the 2020–2021 season, with an initial contract of 5 seasons.
- 5 June – The Vienna Philharmonic Orchestra announces the awarding of honorary membership in the orchestra to Mariss Jansons.
- 7 June – Thea Musgrave receives The queen's Medal for Music 2017, in a private audience with HRH queen Elizabeth II.
- 8 June – Queen's Birthday Honours:
  - Dame Kiri Te Kanawa is made a Companion of Honour.
  - Simon Keenlyside is made a Knight Bachelor.
  - Thomas Adès and Gillian Moore are each made a Commander of the Order of the British Empire.
  - Alice Coote and Debbie Wiseman are each made an Officer of the Order of the British Empire.
  - Rosemary Johnson is made a Member of the Order of the British Empire.
- 12 June – The Philharmonisches Orchester Altenburg-Gera announces that Laurent Wagner is to conclude his tenure as its Generalmusikdirektor at the close of the 2019–2020 season.
- 19 June – The Deutsches Nationaltheater and Staatskapelle Weimar announces that Kirill Karabits is to stand down as its Generalmusikdirektor at the close of the 2018–2019 season, following an inability to reach terms on a contract negotiation for extending his tenure.
- 20 June – The Bohuslav Martinů Philharmonic Orchestra (Zlín) announces the appointment of Tomáš Brauner as its next chief conductor, effective with the 2018–2019 season.
- 23 June – The Elora Singers announces the appointment of Mark Vuorinen as its new artistic director, after having served as interim artistic director since March 2018, following the resignation of Noel Edison.
- 24 June – Never heard complete during the composer's lifetime, the opera Přijď království Tvé (Thy Kingdom Come) by Alois Hába receives its first performance at the Dny nové opery Ostrava (New Opera Days Ostrava) festival.
- 25 June – The Cleveland Institute of Music announces the severance of its relationship with the Cavani String Quartet.
- 26 June – Southbank Sinfonia announces the appointment of William Norris as its next managing director, effective July 2018.
- 27 June
  - The Bochum Symphony Orchestra (Bochumer Symphoniker) announces that Steven Sloane is to conclude his tenure as its Generalmusikdirektor (GMD) at the close of the 2020–2021 season.
  - The Kalamazoo Symphony Orchestra announces the appointment of Julian Kuerti as its next music director, effective with the 2018–2019 season.
  - Kentucky Opera announces the appointment of Barbara Lynne Jamison as its next general director, effective 15 August 2018.
- 1 July – John von Rhein, classical music critic of the Chicago Tribune since 1977, retires from his post.
- 2 July
  - Zurich Opera announces the appointment of Gianandrea Noseda as its next Generalmusikdirektor, effective in 2021. In parallel, the company announces that Fabio Luisi is to stand down as its GMD in 2021.
  - The Royal Philharmonic Orchestra announces the appointment of Vasily Petrenko as its new music director, effective with the 2021–2022 season, with an initial contract of 5 years.
  - The Royal Liverpool Philharmonic Orchestra (RLPO) announces that Vasily Petrenko is to conclude his tenure as its chief conductor as of the end of the 2020–2021 season, and subsequently to take the title of conductor laureate of the RLPO.
  - Elizabeth Rowe, principal flautist of the Boston Symphony Orchestra, files a lawsuit against the orchestra under the new Massachusetts Equal Pay Law, alleging salary inequities by the orchestra.
- 3 July – The governor general of Canada announces the investiture of François Mario Labbé and Earl Stafford as members of the Order of Canada.
- 4 July – The Susan Chilcott Scholarship announces soprano Gemma Summerfield as the final recipient of the Chilcott Award.
- 5 July – The Irish Department of Culture, Heritage and the Gaeltacht announces that the RTÉ National Symphony Orchestra is to come under the remit of the National Concert Hall.
- 9 July – ORA Singers announces the appointment of Stephen Fry as its new president.
- 9 July – The New West Symphony announces the appointment of Stephanie Wilson as the director of development.
- 10 July – The Omaha Symphony Orchestra announces the appointment of Jennifer Boomgaarden as its next president and chief executive officer, effective 4 September 2018.
- 11 July
  - The Japan Art Association announces Riccardo Muti as the 2018 Praemium Imperiale recipient in the field of music.
  - The San Antonio Symphony announces the appointment of Michael Kaiser as its interim executive director, with immediate effect, and a scheduled conclusion at the close of 2018.
  - From the Top announces that Christopher O'Riley is no longer to serve as host of its eponymous radio programme.
- 24 July – The first performance of the new opera der verschwundene hochzeiter at the Bayreuth Festival takes place, the first world premiere at the Bayreuth Festival since 1882.
- 25 July – The first night of the new Bayreuth Festival production of Lohengrin takes place, directed by Yuval Sharon, the first American director to head a production at the Bayreuth Festival.
- 26 July
  - The Academy of Ancient Music announces that Richard Egarr is to stand down as its music director at the close of the 2020–2021 season.
  - The Washington Post publishes an article by Anne Midgette and Peggy McGlone that details past allegations of sexual misconduct by violinist William Preucil, conductor Daniele Gatti, and opera administrator Bernard Uzan.
- 27 July
  - The Teatro Massimo di Palermo announces the appointment of Omer Meir Wellber as its next music director, effective January 2020.
  - The Cleveland Orchestra announces the suspension of its concertmaster (leader), William Preucil, one day after publication in The Washington Post of allegations of sexual misbehaviour dating from 1998 against him.
- 1 August
  - Oberlin College announces that Andrea Kalyn is to stand down as the Dean of the Oberlin College Conservatory of Music after the autumn 2018 semester.
  - The New England Conservatory of Music announces the appointment of Andrea Kalyn as its next president, effective January 2019.
- 2 August
  - The Royal Concertgebouw Orchestra dismisses Daniele Gatti as its chief conductor, with immediate effect, after allegations of sexual misbehaviour against various female musicians, including musicians of the orchestra.
  - The Portland Symphony Orchestra announces the appointment of Eckart Preu as its next music director, effective with the 2019–2020 season, with an initial contract of 3 seasons.
- 9 August – Glyndebourne Festival Opera announces the appointment of Stephen Langridge as its next artistic director, effective spring 2019.
- 10 August – The Minnesota Orchestra gives the first concert of its first-ever tour to South Africa at City Hall, Cape Town, the first American orchestra ever to perform in South Africa.
- 11 August – Boston Ballet announces the appointment of Mischa Santora as its next music director.
- 20 August – The Malmö Symphony Orchestra announces the appointment of Robert Trevino as its next chief conductor, effective with the 2019–2020 season.
- 22 August – The University of Michigan reports music faculty David Daniels as on leave of absence, following allegations by singer Samuel Schultz of sexual assault by Daniels and his then-partner Scott Walters against him in 2010 at Houston Grand Opera.
- 27 August
  - The Fort Worth Symphony Orchestra announces the appointment of Keith Cerny as its next president and chief executive officer, as of January 2019.
  - Calgary Opera announces that Keith Cerny is to stand down as its general director in January 2019.
- 31 August – The Leeds International Piano Competition announces the appointment of Fiona Sinclair as its next chief executive, eff3ective 1 October 2018.
- 5 September
  - The Staatstheater Darmstadt announces the appointment of Daniel Cohen as its next Generalmusikdirektor, effective October 2018, with an initial contract of 5 seasons.
  - The Lucerne Festival announces that Matthias Pintscher has stood down as principal conductor of the Lucerne Festival Academy, with immediate effect.
- 6 September
  - Opera Vlaanderen announces the appointment of Alejo Pérez as its next music director, effective with the 2019–2020 season.
  - Welsh National Opera announces the appointment of Aidan Lang as its next general director, effective July 2019.
  - Seattle Opera announces that Aidan Lang is to stand down as its general director in June 2019.
- 7 September – The Tasmanian Symphony Orchestra announces the appointment of Eivind Aadland as its next chief conductor and artistic advisor, effective in 2020.
- 8 September – At the Philharmonie de Paris, Ralph van Raat gives the world premiere performance of the Prélude, Toccata et Scherzo by Pierre Boulez, originally composed in 1944, but banned by Boulez from live performance during his lifetime.
- 12 September
  - The Paris Opera announces that Stéphane Lissner is to conclude his tenure as its general director at the conclusion of his contract of August 2021.
  - Florida Grand Opera (FGO) announces that Susan T. Danis is to remain as the company's general director, following revelation of a defamatory letter by former FGO employee Graham Fandrei.
  - The La Jolla Music Society announces that Susan T. Danis has rescinded her acceptance of the posts of its president and chief executive officer, in tandem with her decision to remain with Florida Grand Opera.
- 13 September
  - The Theater Magdeburg announces the appointment of Anna Skryleva as its new general music director (Generalmusikdirektorin), effective with the 2019–2020 season.
  - The Warsaw Philharmonic announces the appointment of Andrey Boreyko as its next artistic director and music director, effective with the 2019–2020 season.
  - The Rhode Island Philharmonic Orchestra announces the appointment of Bramwell Tovey as the new artistic advisor of the Rhode Island Philharmonic Orchestra & Music School, with immediate effect.
- 14 September – The Metropolitan Opera announces ratification of a new contract by unions for the company's orchestra, chorus and other groups to allow Sunday matinee performances by the company for the first time ever, starting with the 2019–2020 season.
- 15 September – The Leeds International Piano Competition announces Eric Lu as the winner of its 19th competition.
- 16 September – The New York Philharmonic announces the suspension of principal oboe Liang Wang and associate principal trumpet Matthew Muckey from the orchestra, following allegations of sexual misconduct against them.
- 17 September – The Staatskapelle Halle announces the appointment of Ariane Matiakh as the new general music director (Generalmusikdirektorin) of the Theater, Oper und Orchester GmbH Halle, effective with the 2019–2020 season, the first female conductor ever to be named to the posts.
- 18 September
  - The Akademie der Wissenschaften und der Literatur Mainz announces Jörg Widmann as the 2018 winner of the Robert Schumann-Preis für Dichtung und Musik (Robert Schumann Prize for Poetry and Music).
  - The Toronto Symphony Orchestra announces the appointment of Gustavo Gimeno as its next music director, effective with the 2020–2021 season, with an initial contract of 5 years.
- 19 September – The Dresden Philharmonic announces the appointment of Marek Janowski to his second tenure as its chief conductor, effective with the 2019–2020 season, with an initial contract of 3 seasons.
- 22 September – Gemma New conducts the opening concert of the 2018–2019 season of the Saint Louis Symphony Orchestra, the first female conductor ever to do so.
- 24 September
  - The Bergische Symphoniker announces the appointment of Daniel Huppert as its next Generalmusikdirektor (GMD), effective with the 2019–2020 season, with an initial contract of 5 years.
  - The Mecklenburgisches Staatstheater and Mecklenburgische Staatskapelle Schwerin announce that Daniel Huppert is to conclude his tenure as the company's GMD at the close of the 2019–2020 season.
- 26 September – The Jena Philharmonic announces the departure of Juliane Wandel as its Intendantin, just prior to the start of the 2018–2019 season.
- 28 September
  - The Tiroler Landestheater und Symphonieorchester Innsbruck announces the appointment of Kerem Hasan as its next chief conductor, effective with the 2019–2020 season.
  - Washington National Opera announces the appointment of Evan Rogister as its new principal conductor, with immediate effect, with an initial contract through the 2021–2022 season.
- 2 October
  - The Orchestre national d'Île-de-France announces the appointment of Case Scaglione as its next music director, effective with the 2019–2020 season.
  - The Philharmonia Baroque Orchestra announces that Nicholas McGegan is to stand down as its music director after the 2019–2020 season, and to take the title of music director laureate.
- 3 October – The Oslo Philharmonic announces the appointment of Klaus Mäkelä as its next chief conductor, effective with the 2020–2021 season, with an initial contract of 3 seasons.
- 4 October
  - The BBC Philharmonic announces the appointment of Omer Meir Wellber as its next chief conductor, effective with the 2019–2020 season, with an initial contract of 4 years.
  - The MacArthur Foundation announces its 2018 MacArthur Foundation Fellows, which include composer Matthew Aucoin and violinist Vijay Gupta.
  - Leila Josefowicz is awarded the Avery Fisher Prize for her championing of contemporary music.
- 9 October
  - The orchestra musicians of Lyric Opera of Chicago take industrial action, in protest at the contract offering from company management that proposes reductions in the size of the orchestra.
  - The Ames, Totenberg Stradivarius is formally lent to Nathan Meltzer, an 18-year old violin student at the Juilliard School, the first violinist to be presented with the instrument since its recovery.
- 10 October – Boston Baroque announces the appointment of Jennifer Ritvo Hughes as its next executive director, effective 26 November 2018.
- 11 October – The Theater Basel announces the appointment of Kristiina Poska as its next general music director (GMD; Generalmusikdirektorin), effective with the 2019–2020 season.
- 14 October – The orchestra musicians of Lyric Opera of Chicago ratify a new labour agreement with the company's management, ending the work stoppage and acceding to most of the management demands.
- 16 October – The Göttingen International Handel Festival announces the appointment of George Petrou as its next artistic director, effective with the 2021–2022 season.
- 18 October
  - Gustavo Dudamel is announced as the recipient of the 2018 Dorothy and Lillian Gish Prize.
  - A news report in The Philadelphia Inquirer indicates that pianist Leon Bates has formally retired, following a diagnosis of Parkinson's disease.
- 21 October – The Requiem of Alexander Kastalsky, composed during World War I, receives its world premiere performance in its full 17-movement version at the Washington National Cathedral, conducted by Leonard Slatkin.
- 24 October – The Cleveland Orchestra dismisses William Preucil as its concertmaster (leader) and Massimo La Rosa as its principal trombonist with immediate effect, after a 3-month investigation into charges of sexual misconduct by each of them that determined the charges to be valid.
- 27 October – The Mass Via Victrix of Sir Charles Villiers Stanford receives its first-ever complete performance, 99 years after its composition, in Cardiff by the BBC National Orchestra of Wales, the BBC National Chorus of Wales, and vocal soloists Kiandra Howarth, Jess Dandy, Ruairi Bowen, and Gareth Brynmor John.
- 5 November – The Dartington International Summer School and Festival announces the appointment of Sara Mohr-Pietsch as its next artistic director, effective January 2019, with her first programmed season scheduled to occur in 2020.
- 6 November – Glyndebourne Festival Opera announces the appointment of Ben Glassberg as the new principal conductor of the Glyndebourne Tour, with an initial contract of 3 years.
- 12 November – The Milwaukee Symphony Orchestra announces the appointment of Ken-David Masur as its next music director, effective with the 2019–2020 season, with an initial contract of 4 seasons.
- 13 November – The San Antonio Symphony announces the appointment of Corey Cowart as its next executive director, effective 1 January 2019.
- 15 November – G. Schirmer, Inc. announces its acquisition of the worldwide publishing rights to the works of Florence Price.
- 16 November
  - The Würth Philharmoniker announces the appointment of Claudio Vandelli as its next chief conductor, effective 1 January 2020.
  - Jacques Boucher and Valerie Tryon are each appointed a member of the Order of Canada.
- 20 November – The Symphony No 2 of Julius Eastman, composed in 1983, receives its world premiere performance at Alice Tully Hall, New York City, with the Mannes Orchestra conducted by Luciano Chessa, who also edited the score.
- 23 November – The Donatella Flick LSO Conducting Competition 2018 announces Felix Mildenberger as its winner, which includes the appointment of Mildenberger as the new assistant conductor of the London Symphony Orchestra for a 2-year period.
- 26 November
  - The Hong Kong Sinfonietta announces that Yip Wing-sie is to conclude her tenure as its music director at the close of the 2019–2020 season.
  - The Royal Northern College of Music announces the appointment of Sara Ascenso as its first-ever lecturer in Musicians' Health and Wellbeing, the first UK music institution ever to institute such a post.
- 3 December
  - The Orchestre National de Lyon announces the appointment of Nikolaj Szeps-Znaider as its next music director, effective September 2020, with an initial contract of 4 seasons.
  - Chetham's School of Music announces the appointment of Tom Redmond as its next director of music, effective September 2019.
  - The Hochschule für Musik Dresden announces the appointment of Axel Köhler as its next Rektor.
  - Joel Bons is announced as the recipient of the 2019 Grawemeyer Award for Music Composition for his work Nomaden.
- 4 December
  - The Philharmonia Orchestra announces that Esa-Pekka Salonen is to stand down as its principal conductor after the close of the 2020–2021 season.
  - The Teatro dell'Opera di Roma announces the appointment of Daniele Gatti as its new music director, with immediate effect.
- 5 December
  - The San Francisco Symphony announces the appointment of Esa-Pekka Salonen as its next music director, effective with the 2020–2021 season, with an initial contract of 5 seasons.
  - The Minnesota Orchestra announces that Osmo Vänskä is to conclude his tenure as its music director after the close of the 2021–2022 season.
- 6 December – The Staatsphilharmonie Rheinland-Pfalz announces the appointment of Michael Francis as its next chief conductor, effective with the 2019–2020 season, with an initial contract of 5 years.
- 7 December
  - Graz Opera and the Graz Philharmonic Orchestra announce the appointment of Roland Kluttig as its next principal conductor, effective with the 2020–2021 season, with an initial contract of 3 seasons. In parallel, Oksana Lyniv is to stand down as GMD of both posts at the close of the 2019–2020 season.
  - The Landestheater Coburg announces that Roland Kluttig is to conclude his tenure as GMD of the company at the close of the 2019–2020 season.
  - The Südwestrundfunk (SWR) announces that Peter Boudgoust is to stand down as its Intendant (artistic director) in mid-2019, ahead of his current contract.
- 8 December – At the Konserthuset Stockholm, Karina Canellakis conducts the annual Nobel Prize concert with the Royal Stockholm Philharmonic Orchestra, the first female conductor ever to conduct the Nobel Prize concert.
- 10 December – The University of Michigan School of Music, Theatre & Dance places Stephen Shipps on administrative leave, following accusations of sexual misconduct by Shipps dating back to 1978.
- 14 December – The Hong Kong Philharmonic Orchestra announces the appointment of Benedikt Fohr as its next chief executive, effective 1 April 2019.
- 17 December – The Philharmonie Südwestfalen announces the appointment of Nabil Shehata as its next chief conductor, effective with the 2019–2020 season.
- 19 December
  - The Royal Scottish National Orchestra announces the appointment of Alistair Mackie as its next chief executive, effective April 2019.
  - The Florida Orchestra announces the appointment of Mark Cantrell as its next president and chief executive officer.
- 21 December
  - Bard College announces the appointment of Tan Dun as the new dean of the Bard College Conservatory of Music, effective 1 July 2019.
  - The Washington Chorus announces the appointment of Stephen Marc Beaudoin as its new executive director, effective 4 February 2019.
- 27 December – The governor general of Canada announces the appointment of John Rea to the Order of Canada.
- 28 December – UK New Year's Honours:
  - Nicola Benedetti and Nitin Sawhney are each made a Commander of the Order of British Empire.
  - Christian Blackshaw, Stephen Darlington, David Hill, and Jacqueline Tyler are each made a Member of the Order of the British Empire.
  - Shirley Thompson is made an Officer of the Order of the British Empire.

== New works ==
The following composers' works were composed, premiered, or published this year, as noted in the citation.

=== A ===
- Hans Abrahamsen – Three Pieces for Orchestra
- John Luther Adams – Become Desert
- Samuel Carl Adams
  - Chamber Concerto
  - Movements (for us and them)
- George Alexander Albrecht – Requiem für Syrien (Requiem for Syria)
- Louis Andriessen – Agamemnon
- Georges Aperghis – Intermezzi
- Darin Atwater – South Side: Symphonic Dances

=== B ===
- Malin Bång – splinters of ebullient rebellion
- Richard Barnard – In Cambridge Town
- Gerald Barry – Organ Concerto
- Gerard Beljon – Planctus Cygni
- Iain Bell – Aurora
- Harrison Birtwistle
  - Keyboard Engine
  - Donum Simoni MMXVIII
- Bishi – The Good Immigrant
- Johannes Boris Borowski
  - As if
  - Up and Down
- Laura Bowler – /ˌfɛmɪˈnɪnɪti/.
- Benjamin C.S. Boyle – Voyages
- Rory Boyle – Songs of the Marshes
- Charlotte Bray – Reflections in Time

=== C ===
- Ewan Campbell – Frail Skies
- Philip Cashian – Piano Concerto ('The Book of Ingenious Devices')
- Giancarlo Castro – Trumpet Concerto
- Christopher Cerrone
  - A Natural History of Vacant Lots
  - Concerto for Violin and Orchestra ("Breaks and Breaks")
- Lyle Chan – Three Bilitis Movements
- Enrico Chapela – Espressio Doppio (for two clarinets and orchestra)
- Guillaume Connesson – Les Horizons Perdus (violin concerto)
- Olivier Cuendet – Foresta incantata
- Kim Cunio – Psalm 137 ("By the rivers of Babylon")
- Joe Cutler – Elsewhereness

=== D ===
- Richard Danielpour – Carnival of the Ancients
- Brett Dean – Cello Concerto
- Bryce Dessner – Concerto for Two Pianos and Orchestra
- Avner Dorman – Eternal Rhythm (percussion concerto)
- Jonathan Dove – The Kerry Christmas Carol
- Melissa Dunphy – Suite Remembrance

=== E ===
- Bushra El-Turk – 'Crème Brûlée on a Tree'
- Melody Eötvös – Ruler of the Hive
- Peter Eötvös – Now, Miss!
- Eriks Esenvalds
  - The Pleiades
  - Shadow
  - On Friendship
- Roshanne Etezady – Diamond Rain
- Frithjof Eydam – 27

=== F ===
- Suzanne Farrin – Hypersea
- Samantha Fernando – Formations
- Ivan Fedele – Air on air
- Ross Fiddes – Love Stories
- Cheryl Frances-Hoad
  - Between the Skies, the River and the Hills (piano concerto)
  - Last Man Standing (text by Tamsin Collison)
- Luca Francesconi – Daedalus
- Patrick Friel – A Line Alive
- Ashley Fure – Filament

=== G ===
- Brad Gill – 'Drop off the body'
- Marcus Goddard – Violin Concerto
- Alex Gowan-Webster – Cantio Invocatione
- Stuart Greenbaum – Tide Moon Earth Sun (Concerto for harp and strings)
- Galina Grigorjeva – Chant
- Helen Grime
  - Bright Travellers (Fiona Benson, texts)
  - Woven Space
- Sydney Guillaume – Alleluia Amen
- Elliott Gyger – Baptism by Fire

=== H ===
- Juliana Hall – Cameos (mezzo soprano version)
- Geoffrey Hanson – Death be not Proud
- Holly Harrison – Airbender (for bassoon and string quartet)
- Fritz Hauser – Transitions
- Ted Hearne – Brass Tacks
- Markus Hechtle – Lichtung
- Christian Henking – Nunc habemus endiviam
- Jennifer Higdon
  - Low Brass Concerto
  - Tuba Concerto
- York Höller – Viola Concerto
- Simon Holt
  - Llanto (para las chumberas) (Lament [for the prickly pears])
  - 4th Quartet ('Cloud House')
- Toshio Hosokawa – Klänge der Lethe
- Joseph Howard – Painkiller
- Thomas Hyde
  - Symphony
  - Les at Leisure (comedy overture)

=== I ===
- Leonardo Idrobo – unspoken (scene V)
- Lisa Illean – Weather a Rare Blue

=== J ===
- Gabriel Jackson – Stabat Mater
- Joel Järventausta – Tumma
- Sarah Jenkins – And the sun stood still
- Patrick John Jones – Betelgeuse Astral Funicular
- Samuel Jones – Flute Concerto

=== K ===
- Vera Kappeler – Wolk
- Alireza Khiabani – greenafter...an iranian perpetual dance
- Daniel Kidane – Dream Song
- Jan Esra Kuhl – again
- Hanna Kulenty – Double Cello Concerto
- Gary Kulesha – Double Concerto for Violin, Viola and Orchestra

=== L ===
- Helmut Lachenmann – My Melodies (for 8 horns and orchestra)
- James Ledger – String Quartet No 2 ('The Distortion Mirror')
- Nicola LeFanu (music) and Wendy Cope (text) – St Hilda of Whitby
- Jonathan Leshnoff – Violin Concerto No 2
- David Ludwig and Katie Ford – The Anchoress

=== M ===
- Tod Machover – Philadelphia Voices
- Steven Mackey – Joy Rhythm Study (for string quintet)
- Sir James MacMillan (music) and Charles Hamilton Sorley (poems) – All the Hills and Vales Along
- Benedict Mason – Ricochet
- Christian Mason – Man Made
- David Matthews – Symphony No 9
- Hermann Meier – Stück (for piano and large orchestra)
- Anna Meredith – Five Telegrams
- Jared Miller – Luster
- Jocelyn Morlock – Night, Herself
- Nico Muhly – Liar (Suite from Marnie)
- Isabel Mundry
  - Hey!
  - Mouhanad
- Brigitta Muntendorf – Ballett for eleven musicians
- Thea Musgrave
  - La Vida es Sueño
  - Whirlwind

=== N ===
- Andrew Norman – Sustain
- Lucas Niggli – Flood

=== O ===
- Kris Oelbrandt
  - Peace Cantata
  - Seven Manieren van Minne
- Elizabeth Ogonek – The Water Cantos [notes from quiet places]

=== P ===
- Anastasia Pahos – Psalm 22 ("The Lord is My Shepherd")
- Roxanna Panufnik – Songs of Darkness, Dreams of Light
- Gérard Pesson – 'Sur ce que j'ai fait cette musique dans une grande lenteur & mélancolie'
- Lara Poe – Mirror Rim
- Jānis Petraškevičs – Dead Wind
- Francis Pott – Ardor Amoris
- Stephen Pratt – Symphonies of Time and Tide
- André Previn – The Fifth Season
- Deborah Pritchard – River Above

=== R ===
- Steve Reich – Music for Ensemble and Orchestra
- Eve Risser – Furakèla
- Katharina Rosenberger – Meeresgesänge
- Christopher Rouse – Bassoon Concerto
- Roberto Rusconi – String Quartet No. 5 ('Algorithm in one movement')
- Clemens Rynkowski – Concerto for Theremin and Orchestra

=== S ===
- Aulis Sallinen
  - Eight miniatures for solopiano
  - Chamber Music IX Op. 112 Nocturne for singer and strings
- Rebecca Saunders
  - Unbreathed (for string quartet)
  - O, Yes & I
- Andrea Lorenzo Scartazzini – torso
- Steffen Schleiermacher – Relief für Orchester
- Denis Schuler – The fugitive from heaven
- Salvatore Sciarrino – Cresce veloce un cristallo
- Adam Schoenberg – Orchard in Fog (Violin Concerto)
- Nina Šenk – Baca
- Rodney Sharman – Shared Harmony
- Caroline Shaw
  - Seven Joys
  - Second Essay (Echo) (for string quartet)
  - Third Essay (Ruby) (for string quartet)
- Rodion Shchedrin – Duo for violin and cello
- Sean Shepherd – Abstract Expressionism
- Noam Sheriff – Lenny (symphonic sketches for orchestra)
- Angela Elizabeth Slater – Soaring in Stasis
- Linda Catlin Smith – Uncertain (for 8 voices)
- Sarah Kirkland Snider – Mass for the Endangered
- Tyshawn Sorey (music) and Terrance Hayes (text) – Cycles of My Being
- Simone Spagnolo (music) and Giordano Trischitta (text) – Faust, Alberta
- James Stephenson – Pillars (concerto for low brass and orchestra)
- Oscar Strasnoy – d'amore
- Petra Strahovnik – Prana
- Mike Svoboda – Coro di Spiriti
- Paweł Szymański – Fourteen Points – Woodrow Wilson Overture

=== T ===
- Dobrinka Tabakova – Tectonic
- Steven Takasugi – Howl
- Joby Talbot – Ink Dark Moon (Guitar Concerto)
- Tan Dun – Buddha Passion
- Conrad Tao – Everything Must Go
- Iris ter Schiphorst – JEDER
- Helen Thomson (music) and Greg Lehman (text) – A Tasmanian Requiem
- Bramwell Tovey – Sinfonia Della Passione
- Calliope Tsoupaki – Salto di Saffo

=== U ===
- Leslie Uyeda (music) and Lorna Crozier (text) – Midnight Watch

=== V ===
- Reza Vali – Ormavi
- Bram van Camp – Music for 5 instruments
- Jan van de Putte – Cette agitation perpétuelle, cette turbulence sans but
- Philip Venables
  - The Gender Agenda
  - Venables Plays Bartók (violin concerto)

=== W ===
- Julian Wachner – Epistle Mass
- Errollyn Wallen – Concerto for Violin, Viola and Accordion
- Rolf Wallin – Violin Concerto ('Whirld')
- Huw Watkins – Spring
- Lara Weaver – Christus factus est
- Judith Weir
  - Piano Quintet
  - Oboe Concerto
- Jessica Wells
  - Rhapsody for solo oud
  - Copenhagen Christmas
- Sally Whitwell – Three by Three
- Jörg Widmann
  - Partita
  - Violin Concerto No. 2
- Emma Wilde – El Blanco Día
- Chris William – 'Pass to us the cups from which sorrow is forgotten'
- Alison Willis – 'A Light Not Yet Ready to Go Out'
- Alex Woolf (music) and Gillian Clarke (new text) – Requiem
- Chris Wright – Symphony

=== Y ===
- Stephen Yates – Bat-Music

== New operas ==
- Giorgio Battistelli and Sarah Woods – Wake
- Lembit Beecher and Hannah Moscovitch – Sky on Swings
- Sir George Benjamin and Martin Crimp – Lessons in Love and Violence
- Michael Betteridge (music) and Ingunn Lara Kristjansdottir (libretto) – #echochamber or #bergmálsklefinn
- Jonas S. Bohlin (music and libretto) and Torbjörn Elensky (libretto) – Tristessa
- Tansy Davies and Nick Drake – The Cave
- Paul Dean and Rodney Hall – Dry River Run
- Christian Diendorfer and Hermann Schneider – Die Wand
- Leonard Evers and Flora Verbrugge – GOLD!
- Nathan Fletcher and Megan Cohen – A Bridge for Three
- Dai Fujikura and Hannah Dübgen – Der Goldkäfer
- John Glover and Erin Bregman – Precita Park
- David Hertzberg – The Rose Elf
- Toshio Hosokawa and Marcel Beyer – Erdbeben.Träume.
- Emily Howard and Selma Dimitrijevic – To See the Invisible
- Huang Ruo and David Henry Hwang – An American Soldier (new expanded version)
- Michael Jarrell – Bérénice
- György Kurtág – Fin de partie
- David Lang (music) and Anne Carson & Claudia Rankine (libretto) – The Mile-Long Opera: a biography of 7 o'clock
- Klaus Lang – der verschwundene hochzeiter
- Elena Langer and Emma Jenkins – Rhondda Rips It Up!
- Thomas Larcher and Friederike Gösweiner – Das Jagdgewehr (The Hunting Gun)
- Tod Machover and Simon Robson – Schoenberg in Hollywood
- Missy Mazzoli and Royce Vavrek – Proving Up
- Ella Milch-Sheriff and Savyon Liebrecht – Die Banalität der Liebe
- Gity Razaz – Fault Lines
- Peter Ruzicka and Yona Kim – Benjamin
- David Sawer and Rory Mullarkey – The Skating Rink
- Johannes Maria Staud and Durs Grünbein – Die Weiden
- Mark-Anthony Turnage and Rory Mullarkey – Coraline
- Marco Tutino (music), Luca Rossi and Wolfgang Haendele (libretto) – Falscher Verrat
- Rufus Wainwright and Daniel MacIvor – Hadrian

== Albums ==
- Iannis Xenakis – Terretekorth, Nomos Gamma, Metastaseis A
- Igor Stravinsky – Chant funèbre (first commercial recording), Le Faune et la Bergère et al. (Lucerne Festival Orchestra; Riccardo Chailly)
- Anthony Burgess – The Bad-Tempered Electronic Keyboard
- Steven Burke – In Time's Wake / Spring Fever / Fusion / Dream Forms
- Benet Casablancas – 'The Art of the Ensemble' (Dove of Peace / Homage to Picasso / Octeto / Four Darks in Red Mokusei Gardens / ...der graue Wald sich unter ihm schüttelte / Dance, Song and Celebration)
- Laura Schwendinger – Creature Quartet: Hymn for Lost Creatures / Sudden Light / String Quartet / Song for Andrew
- George Walker – Sinfonia No 5 (two versions, first recording; Sinfonia Varsovia; Ian Hobson)
- Philippe Boesmans (music) and Joel Pommerat (libretto) – Pinocchio
- Jake Heggie (music) and Terrence McNally (libretto) – Great Scott
- Sir Arthur Bliss – The Beatitudes (first commercial recording) et al. (Emily Birsan, Ben Johnson; BBC Symphony Orchestra and BBC Symphony Chorus; Sir Andrew Davis)
- Robert Aldridge (music) and Herschel Garfein (libretto) – Sister Carrie
- Brian Ferneyhough – La Terre Est Un Homme, Plötzlichkeit
- Grażyna Bacewicz – Piano Quintets Nos 1 & 2 / Quartet for Four Violins / Quartet for Four Cellos
- James Tenney – Harmonium
- Philip Venables – Below the Belt
- Gillian Whitehead – Shadows Crossing Water
- Christian Wolff – 'Two Orchestra Pieces' (John, David; Rhapsody)
- John Adams (music) and Peter Sellars (libretto) – Doctor Atomic
- William Wordsworth – 'Orchestral Works, Volume I' (Symphonies Nos 4 & 8; Divertimento in D, op 58; Variations on a Scottish Theme, op 72)
- Leonard Bernstein – A Quiet Place (chamber version by Garth Edwin Sunderland; first recording)
- Mason Bates (music) and Mark Campbell (libretto) – The (R)evolution of Steve Jobs
- Sergei Rachmaninov – 'Rachmaninoff Plays Symphonic Dances (Newly Discovered 1940 Recording)'
- Jörg Widmann – Arche
- Birgit Nilsson: The Great Live Recordings

== Deaths ==
- 1 January
  - Peter Evans, British music scholar and expert on the music of Benjamin Britten, 88
  - Robert Mann, American violinist and founding member of the Juilliard String Quartet, 97
- 3 January
  - Colin Brumby, Australian composer, 84
  - Luigi Alberto Bianchi, Italian violinist and violist, 73
  - Miroslav Miletić, Croatian composer, pedagogue and instrumentalist, 92
- 6 January – Walther Dürr, German music scholar and specialist in the music of Franz Schubert, 85
- 7 January – Will Gay Bottje, American composer, 92
- 11 January – Reinhard Ulbricht, German orchestral violinist and music professor, 90
- 12 January – Pierre Pincemaille, French organist, 61
- 13 January – Josette Alviset, French arts administrator, music educator, musician, and past director of the Musée de l'Opéra de Vichy, 80
- 14 January – Paul Lustig Dunkel, American flautist and conductor, 74.
- 15 January – Anshel Brusilow, American violinist, conductor, and educator, 89
- 24 January – Renaud Gagneux, French composer, 70
- 26 January
  - Robert Capanna, American music administrator and composer, 65
  - Ed Birdwell, American music and arts administrator and former French horn player, 81
- 30 January – Robert Rattray, British-born opera house administrator and musicians' agent, 67
- 1 February – Alan Stout, American composer and music professor, 85
- 5 February – Caroline Brown, British cellist and founder of the Hanover Band, 64
- 8 February – Paul Danblon, Belgian composer, opera director and administrator, and journalist, 86
- 9 February – Jóhann Jóhannsson, Icelandic composer, 48
- 10 February – Raimund Herincx, British baritone, 90
- 12 February – László Melis, Hungarian composer and violinist, 64
- 13 February – Lee Lamont, American artist manager, 86
- 15 February – Milan Křížek, Czech composer, pedagogue and violist, 91
- 17 February – Gustav Zimmermann, German orchestral violinist, 85
- 26 February
  - Juan Hidalgo Codorniu, Spanish composer and artist, 90
  - Richard Hundley, US pianist and composer, 86
- 2 March – Jesús López Cobos, Spanish conductor, 78
- 3 March – Virgilijus Noreika, Lithuanian opera singer, 82
- 8 March – Milko Kelemen, Croatian composer, 93
- 11 March – Axel Wilczok, German orchestral violinist and past leader (Konzertmeister) of the Staatskapelle Berlin, 66
- 12 March – Olly Wilson, American composer, 80
- 16 March
  - Otomar Kvěch, Czech composer, 67
  - Marilyn J. Ziffrin, American composer and pedagogue, 91
- 20 March – Dilbar Abdurahmonova, Uzbekistani conductor, violinist and teacher, 81
- 23 March – José Antonio Abreu, Venezuelan economist and founder of El Sistema, 78
- 28 March
  - Lívia Rév, Hungarian concert pianist, 101
  - Philip De Groote, South African-born cellist and founding member of the Chilingirian Quartet, 68
- 31 March – Michael Tree, American violist and founding member of the Guarneri String Quartet, 84
- 1 April
  - Michel Sénéchal, French tenor, 91
  - Patrick Kavanaugh, composer, conductor and author, 63
- 9 April
  - Felix Chen, Taiwanese conductor, 75
  - J.D. McClatchy, American poet and opera librettist, 72
- 10 April – John Oliver, American choral conductor and founder of the Tanglewood Festival Chorus, 75
- 14 April
  - Jean-Claude Malgoire, French conductor, 77
  - Milan Škampa, Czech violist and past member of the Smetana Quartet, 89
- 15 April – Peter Lloyd, British orchestral flautist, 86
- 21 April
  - Graciela Agudelo, Mexican pianist and composer, 72
  - Huguette Tourangeau, Canadian mezzo-soprano, 78
- 24 April – Lydia Walton Ignacio Russo, Filipina-American pianist and pedagogue, 87
- 1 May – Wanda Wilkomirska, Polish violinist and violin pedagogue, 89
- 2 May – Hermann Krebbers, Dutch violinist and former concertmaster (leader) of the Concertgebouw Orchestra, Amsterdam, 94
- 7 May – Roman Toi, Estonian-born composer, choir conductor and organist active in Canada, 101
- 8 May – Jonathan Sternberg, American conductor and music professor, 98
- 11 May
  - Hyun-Woo Kim, Korean-born American orchestral violinist, 65
  - Matt Marks, American composer and French horn player, and founding member of Alarm Will Sound, 38
- 13 May
  - Glenn Branca, American composer and guitarist, 69
  - Daniel Webster, American classical music critic and journalist for The Philadelphia Inquirer, 86
- 18 May – Katia Popov, Bulgarian-born American orchestral violinist, 50
- 20 May – Dieter Schnebel, German composer, 88
- 24 May – Rebecca Tyree, American choral conductor and music educator, 62
- 25 May – Piet Kee, Dutch organist and composer, 90
- 28 May
  - Mati Palm, Estonian bass-baritone, 78
  - Mary Ellen Hutton, American classical music critic and journalist for the Cincinnati Post, 77
- 29 May – Rosa Briceño Ortiz, Venezuelan conductor and pianist, 61
- 1 June – Andrew Massey, British-born American conductor, 72
- 4 June – Joyce Blackham, British operatic mezzo-soprano, 84
- 9 June – Kristine Ciesinski, American soprano, 65
- 10 June – Leonid Gotman, Russian-born American orchestral violinist, 66
- 15 June – Enoch zu Guttenberg, German conductor, 71
- 16 June – Gennady Rozhdestvensky, Russian conductor, 87
- 18 June – Martin Fischer, German orchestral violinist, 86 (death announced on this date)
- 20 June – Dominik Połoński, Polish cellist, 41
- 25 June – Bo Nilsson, Swedish composer, 81
- 29 June – Franz Beyer, German musicologist and violist, 96
- 7 July – Paul Fetler, American composer and academic, 98
- 8 July – Oliver Knussen, British composer and conductor, 66
- 22 July – Brian Kellow, American writer, journalist and editor, 59
- 25 July – Glen Roven, American composer and musical theatre conductor, 61
- 28 July – Günter Piesk, German orchestral bassoonist, 97
- 1 August – Charles Hamlen, American classical music artist manager and charity official, 75
- 4 August – Maruska Blyszczak, Australian opera wardrobe designer, 75
- 8 August – Arthur Davies, British tenor, 77
- 11 August – Michael Stairs, American organist and music instructor, 72
- 13 August – Rubén D'Artagnan González, Argentine orchestral violinist and past concertmaster (leader) of the Chicago Symphony Orchestra, 79
- 23 August
  - Ronald Arnatt, British-born choir master, organist, composer, and pedagogue, 88
  - George Walker, American composer, 96
- 24 August – James Mallinson, British classical recording engineer, 75
- 25 August – Noam Sheriff, Israeli composer and conductor, 83
- 1 September – Kenneth Bowen, Welsh tenor, 86
- 6 September – Claudio Scimone, Italian conductor and founder of I Solisti Veneti, 84
- 7 September – Sheng Zhongguo, Chinese violinist, 77
- 8 September – Tito Capobianco, Argentine opera director and administrator resident in the United States, 87
- 18 September
  - David DiChiera, American opera administrator and founder of Michigan Opera Theater, 83
  - Piotr de Peslin Lachert, Polish pianist and composer, 80
- 19 September – Peter Jansen, Dutch orchestral double bass player, 71
- 21 September – Katherine Hoover, American composer and flautist, 80
- 25 September – Friedhelm Döhl, German composer and pedagogue, 82
- 1 October – Caroline Charrière, Swiss composer, conductor and flautist, 57
- 3 October
  - Bent Lorentzen, Danish composer, 83
  - Alfred Hubay, American opera house administrative staff member, 93
- 4 October – John Tyrrell, British musicologist and specialist in the works of Leoš Janáček, 76
- 6 October – Montserrat Caballé, Spanish soprano, 85
- 12 October – Takehisa Kosugi, Japanese composer, 80
- 18 October – Randolph Hokanson, American pianist and university teacher, 103
- 24 October – Darijan Božič, Slovenian composer and conductor, 85
- 25 October – Martin Dalby, Scottish composer and music administrator, 76
- 28 October – Richard Gill, Australian conductor and pedagogue, 76
- 31 October – Wolfgang Zuckermann, German-born American harpsichord maker, 96
- 1 November – Ivan March, British music critic, 91
- 2 November – G. Alan Wagner, American baritone and voice professor, 79
- 12 November – Blanche Burton-Lyles, American pianist and curator of the legacy of Marian Anderson, 85
- 17 November – Richard Baker, British news reader and BBC classical music television & radio presenter, 94
- 20 November – Levine Andrade, India-born British violinist and founding member of the Arditti Quartet, 64
- 24 November – Harold Farberman, American conductor, pedagogue, and composer, 89
- 25 November – Nina Beilina, Russian-born violinist resident in the US, 81
- 29 November – Ulrich Leyendecker, German composer, 72
- 6 December – Andrew Frierson, American bass-baritone, 94
- 15 December – Ralph Koltai, German-born British stage designer for opera, theatre, and ballet, 94
- 20 December – Dennis Johnson, American mathematician and composer, 80
- 28 December – Alain Kremski, French pianist and composer, 78
- 29 December – Aldo Parisot, Brazilian-born US-based cellist and university pedagogue, 100
- 30 December
  - Blandine Verlet, French harpsichordist, 76 (death announced on this day)
  - Claude Gingras, Canadian music critic, 87

== Major awards ==
=== Grammy Awards ===
- Best Chamber Music/Small Ensemble Performance: Franz Schubert – Death and the Maiden; Patricia Kopatchinskaja and The Saint Paul Chamber Orchestra (Alpha)
- Best Choral Performance: Gavin Bryars – The Fifth Century; The Crossing; PRISM Quartet; Donald Nally, conductor (ECM New Series)
- Best Classical Compendium: Jennifer Higdon – All Things Majestic, Viola Concerto, Oboe Concerto; James Button, oboe; Roberto Diaz, viola; Nashville Symphony; Giancarlo Guerrero, conductor (Naxos)
- Best Classical Instrumental Solo: Daniil Trifonov – Transcendental (Deutsche Grammophon)
- Best Contemporary Classical Composition: Jennifer Higdon – Viola Concerto; Roberto Diaz, viola; Nashville Symphony; Giancarlo Guerrero, conductor (Naxos)
- Best Classical Solo Vocal Album: Crazy Girl Crazy – Barbara Hannigan and the Ludwig Orchestra (Alpha)
- Best Opera Recording: Alban Berg – Wozzeck; Anne Schwanewilms, Roman Trekel, et al., singers; Chorus of Students And Alumni, Shepherd School of Music, Rice University & Houston Grand Opera Children's Chorus; Houston Symphony; Hans Graf, conductor (Naxos)
- Best Engineered Album, Classical: Shostakovich – Symphony No. 5 / Barber – Adagio for Strings; Pittsburgh Symphony Orchestra; Manfred Honeck, conductor (Reference Recordings)
- Best Orchestral Performance: Shostakovich – Symphony No. 5 / Barber – Adagio for Strings; Pittsburgh Symphony Orchestra; Manfred Honeck, conductor (Reference Recordings)
- Best Historical Album: Leonard Bernstein – The Composer; Robert Russ, producer (Sony Classical)
- Producer of the Year, Classical: David Frost

=== Royal Philharmonic Society Awards ===
- Audiences and Engagement: Classically Yours (Orchestras Live in partnership with East Riding of Yorkshire Council)
- Chamber Music and Song: 'Schumann Street' (Spitalfields Music)
- Chamber-Scale Composition: James Dillon – Tanz/haus Triptych 2017
- Concert Series and Festivals: 'This is Rattle' (London Symphony Orchestra)
- Conductor: Vladimir Jurowski
- Creative Communication: 'Becoming a Lied Singer: Thomas Quasthoff and the Art of German Song' (BBC Studios for BBC 4)
- Ensemble: The Sixteen
- Instrumentalist: Igor Levit
- Large-Scale Composition: Mark-Anthony Turnage – Hibiki
- Learning and Participation: Calderland – A People's Opera (509 Arts)
- Opera and Music Theatre: 'Monteverdi 450 Trilogy' (Monteverdi Choir and Orchestras)
- Singer: Allan Clayton
- Young Artists: Sean Shibe

=== Gramophone Classical Music Awards 2018 ===
- Chamber: Dvořák – Quintets; Boris Giltburg, Pavel Nikl, Pavel Haas Quartet (Supraphon)
- Choral: Arvo Pärt, Magnificat, Nunc dimittis / Alfred Schnittke, Psalms of Repentance; Estonian Philharmonic Chamber Choir; Kaspars Putniņš, director (BIS)
- Concerto: Bartók – Violin Concertos Nos 1 & 2; Christian Tetzlaff, violin; Finnish Radio Symphony Orchestra; Hannu Lintu, conductor (Ondine)
- Contemporary: Pascal Dusapin – String Quartets Nos 6 & 7 etc.: Arditti Quartet; Orchestre Philharmonique de Radio France; Pascal Rophé, conductor (Aeon)
- Early Music: 'Music from the Peterhouse Partbooks, Vol 5'; Blue Heron; Scott Metcalfe (Blue Heron)
- Instrumental: Brahms – Piano Pieces, opp 76, 117 & 118; Arcadi Volodos (Sony Classical)
- Opera: Berlioz – Les Troyens; Joyce DiDonato, Michael Spyres, Marie-Nicole Lemieux, Stéphane Degout, Marianne Crebassa et al., Rhine Opera Chorus, Badischer Staatsopernchor, Strasbourg Philharmonic Choir, Strasbourg Philharmonic Orchestra; John Nelson, conductor (Erato)
- Orchestral: Ravel – Daphnis et Chloé; Ensemble Aedes; Les Siècles; François-Xavier Roth, conductor (harmonia mundi)
- Recital: 'Agitata'; Delphine Galou; Accademia Bizantina; Ottavio Dantone, conductor (Alpha Classics)
- Solo Vocal: 'Secrets'; Marianne Crebassa, Fazıl Say
- Recording of the Year: Berlioz – Les Troyens; Joyce DiDonato, Michael Spyres, Marie-Nicole Lemieux, Stéphane Degout, Marianne Crebassa et al., Rhine Opera Chorus, Badischer Staatsopernchor, Strasbourg Philharmonic Choir, Strasbourg Philharmonic Orchestra; John Nelson, conductor (Erato)
- Young Artist of the Year: Lise Davidsen
- Label of the Year: harmonia mundi
- Artist of the Year: Rachel Podger
- Orchestra of the Year: Seattle Symphony Orchestra
- Lifetime Achievement Award: Neeme Järvi

=== Musical America Awards ===
- Artist of the Year: Daniil Trifonov
- Composer of the Year: Julia Wolfe
- Conductor of the Year: Carlos Miguel Prieto
- Vocalist of the Year: Anthony Roth Costanzo
- Ensemble of the Year: JACK Quartet

=== Juno Awards ===
- Classical Album of the Year, Solo or Chamber: Chopin Recital 3 – Janina Fialkowska
- Classical Album of the Year, Large Ensemble: Chopin: Works for Piano & Orchestra – Jan Lisiecki, NDR Elbphilharmonie Orchester, Krzysztof Urbanski
- Classical Album of the Year, Vocal or Choral: Crazy Girl Crazy – Barbara Hannigan, Ludwig Orchestra
- Classical Composition of the Year: Jocelyn Morlock – My Name is Amanda Todd

=== British Composer Awards ===
- Amateur or Young Performers: Oliver Searle – Microscopic Dances
- Chamber Ensemble: James Weeks – Libro di fiammelle e ombre
- Choral: Judith Weir – In the Land of Uz
- Community or Educational Project: Liam Taylor-West – The Umbrella
- Jazz Composition for Large Ensemble: Cassie Kinoshi – Afronaut
- Jazz Composition for Small Ensemble: Simon Lasky – Close to Ecstasy
- Orchestral: Sir Harrison Birtwistle – Deep Time
- Small Chamber: Rebecca Saunders – Inbreathed
- Solo or Duo: Dominic Murcott – The Harmonic Canon
- Sonic Art: Emily Peasgood – Halfway to Heaven
- Stage Works: Oliver Coates – Shoreline
- Wind Band or Brass Band: Simon Dobson – The Turing Test
- British Composer Award for Innovation: Trevor Wishart
- British Composer Award for Inspiration: Sally Beamish

=== Other ===
- 2018 Grawemeyer Award Winner in Music: Bent Sørensen – L'isola della Città (Triple Concerto)
