= Tuba repertoire =

Set of available musical works for tuba

This page lists classical pieces in the tuba repertoire, including solo works for tuba and chamber music of which the tuba plays a significant part.

== Solo tuba ==
- Georges Aperghis, Ruinen (1994)
- Malcolm Arnold, Fantasy, Op. 102 (1969)
- Gerald Barry, Foghorn (2020)
- John Cage, Solo for Tuba (1957–1958)
- Elliott Carter, Retracing IV (2011)
- Henning Christiansen, Kirkeby og Edvard Munch, Op. 136 (1981)
- Henning Christiansen, Lettres de Tuba, Op. 164 (1984)
- Henning Christiansen, sTilsTand, Op. 167, 168a (1985)
- Franco Donatoni, Che (1997)
- Vinko Globokar, Échanges (1973)
- Tom Johnson, Monologue For Tuba for Narrating Tubist (1978)
- Tom Johnson, Tilework (2003)
- Mauricio Kagel, Mirum (1965)
- Alvin Lucier, Sestina for 6-valve Tuba (2011)
- Krzysztof Penderecki, Capriccio (1980)
- Vincent Persichetti, Serenade No. 12, Op. 88 (1961)
- Vincent Persichetti, Parable XXII, Op. 147 (1981)
- Frederic Rzewski, Honk (2004)
- Boris Tishchenko, Four Pieces, Op. 94 (1985)
- Christian Wolff, Tuba Song (1992)

== Tuba and piano ==
- Leslie Bassett, Song and Dance (1993)
- Leonard Bernstein, Waltz for Mippy III (1948)
- Bruce Broughton, Sonata (Concerto)
- Bruce Broughton, Turbulence (2011)
- Pierre Max Dubois, Histoires de tuba (1988)
- Gala Flagello, Embers (2025)
- Vinko Globokar, Juriritubaïoka (1996)
- Sofia Gubaidulina, Lamento (1977)
- Jennifer Higdon, Tuba Songs (2016)
- Paul Hindemith, Tuba Sonata (1955)
- Vagn Holmboe, Tuba Sonata, Op. 162 (1985)
- Bertold Hummel, Sonatina, Op. 81a (1983)
- Bertold Hummel, 3 Bagatelles, Op. 95h (1993)
- Roger Kellaway, Dr Martin Luther King: in Memoriam (1984)
- Rued Langgaard, Dies irae (1948)
- Corrado Maria Saglietti, Monsters (2019)
- Karlheinz Stockhausen, In Freundschaft, Nr. 46^{13}/_{14} (1977)
- John D. Stevens, Monument (2006)
- Josef Tal, Movement (1980)
- Alexander Tcherepnin, Andante, Op. 64 (1939)
- Barbara York, How Beautiful (2008)

== Tuba choir ==
- Bruce Broughton, Jackhammer for 4 Tubas
- Anthony Burgess, Homage to Hans Keller for 4 Tubas (1982)
- Johannes Fritsch, Tubæ for 2 Tubas (2000)
- Per Nørgård, Nu dækker sne den hele jord – Vintersalmer for 8 Tubas (1976)
- Wolfgang von Schweinitz, Horned Owl Sequence, Op. 53 for 2 Tubas (2010)
- Gunther Schuller, Five Moods for 4 Tubas (1973)
- Christian Wolff, Out-take for 2 Tubas (2005)

== Tuba and instrument(s) ==
- Henning Christiansen, Kredsløbsforstyrrelse, Op. 131 for Recitation and Tuba (1980)
- Pierre Max Dubois, Mini quatuor for 2 Piccolos and 2 Tubas (1977)
- Christopher Fox, Hidden Consequences for Microtonal Horn, Trombone and Microtonal Tuba (2009–10)
- Henryk Górecki, Aria, Op. 59 for Tuba, Piano, Tam-tam and Bass Drum (1987)
- Morton Gould, Tuba Suite for Solo Tuba and 3 Horns (1971)
- Meyer Kupferman, Sound Objects 1-3 (1978), for tuba, trumpet and piano (1978)
- Alvin Lucier, Sestina for Contrabass Flute, Contrabass Saxophone and Contrabass Tuba (2000)
- Larry Polansky, Two Children's Songs for Trombone and Tuba (1992)
- Larry Polansky, Three Pieces for Trombone and Tuba (2011)
- Corrado Maria Saglietti, Monsters for Tuba and Chamber Ensemble (Fl.Ob.Cl.BCl.ASax.Bn.CBn.Hn.3Percussionists) (2019)
- Gunther Schuller, Refrains for 12 Tubas, 10 Euphoniums and Percussion (2006)
- Galina Ustvolskaya, Dona Nobis Pacem, Composition No. 1 for Piccolo, Tuba and Piano (1971)
- Trevor Wishart, Pastorale / Walden 2, Music Theatre for Tuba, Flute and Tape (1979)
- Charles Wuorinen, Never Again the Same for Bass and Tuba (2006)
- Christian Wolff, Out-take (2005)

== Tuba and ensemble ==
- Bruce Broughton, Concerto (Sonata) for Tuba and Winds (1987)
- Bruce Broughton, Turbulence for Tuba and Winds
- Michael Daugherty, Reflections on the Mississippi for Tuba and Symphonic Band (2015)
- Morton Feldman, Durations III for tuba, violin and piano (1961)
- Morton Feldman, Chorus and Instruments II for Choir, Tuba and Chimes (1967)
- Jean Françaix, Petite valse européenne for Tuba and Double Wind Quintet (1979)
- Gordon Jacob, Suite for Tuba and Strings (1972)
- Vagn Holmboe, Intermezzo concertante, Op. 171, for Tuba and String Orchestra (1976)
- David Lang, are you experienced? for Tuba, Narrator and Ensemble (1987)
- Corrado Maria Saglietti, Concertissimo for Tuba and Wind Band (1997)
- Charles Wuorinen, Chamber Concerto for Tuba, Winds and Drums (1970)

== Tuba and orchestra ==
- Kalevi Aho, Tuba Concerto (2000–01)
- Alexander Arutiunian, Concerto for Tuba (1992)
- Øystein Baadsvik, Concerto for Tuba (2015)
- Harrison Birtwistle, The Cry of Anubis (1994)
- Bruce Broughton, Concerto for Tuba (2003)
- Michael Daugherty, Reflections on the Mississippi (2013)
- John Golland, Tuba Concerto, Op. 46 (1980s)
- Edward Gregson, Tuba Concerto (1978)
- Dalibor Grubačević, Concerto for Tuba and Orchestra (2021)
- Jonathan Harvey, Lightness and Weight (1987)
- Jennifer Higdon, Tuba Concerto (2017)
- Vagn Holmboe, Tuba Concerto, Op. 127 (1976)
- Helmut Lachenmann, Harmonica (1981–83)
- William Lovelock, Concerto for Bass Tuba and Orchestra (1967)
- Torbjörn Iwan Lundquist, Landscape for tuba, string orchestra and piano (1978)
- Arild Plau, Concerto for solo tuba and string orchestra (1990)
- Jan Sandström, Lemon House, Tuba Concerto (2002)
- Gunther Schuller, Capriccio (1960)
- Gunther Schuller, Tuba Concerto No. 2 (2008)
- Håkon Skogstad, Concerto for Tuba and Strings (2024)
- Roger Steptoe, Tuba Concerto (1983)
- Roland Szentpáli, Tuba Concerto (2002)
- Ralph Vaughan Williams, Concerto in F minor for Bass Tuba (1954)
- John Williams, Concerto for Tuba and Orchestra (1985)
- Charles Wuorinen, Prelude to Kullervo (1985)

== Tuba, soloist(s) and orchestra ==
- Bruce Broughton, Oliver's Birthday for Tuba, Piano, Trumpet and Symphonic Band (1998)
- Jennifer Higdon, Low Brass Concerto for 2 Tenor Trombones, Bass Trombone, Tuba and Orchestra (2017)
- André Previn, Triple Concerto for Horn, Trumpet, Tuba and Orchestra (2011)

== Electronic / Electroacoustic ==
- Henning Christiansen, Im Bauch des Wolfs, Op. 165 for 3 Tubas and Tape (1985)
- David Cope, Spirals for Tuba and Tape (1972)
- Karlheinz Essl, Si! for Tenor Tuba, Live Electronics and Surround Sound (2012)
- Luca Francesconi, Animus III for Tuba and Live Electronics (2008)
- Vinko Globokar, Introspection d'un tubiste for Tuba, Electronics and Multimedia (1983)
- Jonathan Harvey, Still for Tuba and Electronics (1997)
- Phill Niblock, B Poore for Taped Tuba (1981)
- Luigi Nono, Post-prae-ludium n. 1 per Donau for Tuba and Live Electronics (1987)
- Bernard Parmegiani, Tuba-ci, Tuba-là for Tuba and Tape (1982)
- Bernard Parmegiani, Tuba-raga for Tuba and Tape (1983)
- Trevor Wishart, Tuba Mirum, Music Theatre for Tuba and Tape (1978)

== See also ==
- Euphonium repertoire

== Bibliography ==
- Morris, R. Winston; Goldstein, Edward, eds. (1996). The Tuba Source Book. Bloomington: Indiana University Press. ISBN 978-0-253-32889-2. OCLC 31737584. Wikidata Q135911601.
