= CPAF =

CPAF may refer to:

- Cambodian People's Armed Forces; the official name of the Cambodian pro-Hanoi "Kampuchean People's Revolutionary Armed Forces" (KPRAF) during the transitional times that led to the restoration of the monarchy (1989 - 1993)
- Christian Performing Artists' Fellowship
- Cost Plus Award Fee, a type of cost-plus contract
