= Laura van der Heijden =

Laura van der Heijden may refer to:

- Laura van der Heijden (musician), British cellist
- Laura van der Heijden (handballer), Dutch handball player
