= The Ogre Lover =

2007 string trio composition by Cheryl Frances-Hoad

The Ogre Lover is a 2007 composition for string trio by the British composer Cheryl Frances-Hoad.

== Composition ==
The Ogre Lover has a duration of roughly 9 minutes and is composed in seven short, connected movements.

=== Background and inspiration ===
The piece was inspired by the Ted Hughes poem "Fairytale" from the collection Birthday Letters, which was based on his relationship with Sylvia Plath. The composer described the work in the score program notes, writing, "The poem is full of the vivid imagery of the couple's dreams, of high palaces with forty-nine doors, 'tingling stars', and an ogre lover that waits 'inside death' for Sylvia to return to him every night." She added:

The Ogre Lover was written immediately after finishing a large-scale orchestral piece (which completed my recently submitted PhD portfolio). This had left my brain somewhat frazzled (and temporarily unable to cope with the 'large-scale harmonic structures' with which I had become so obsessed): in The Ogre Lover I therefore simply had fun, indulging myself with all the timbres, motives and harmonies that the poem suggested.

=== Instrumentation ===
The Ogre Lover is scored for a string trio comprising violin, viola, and cello.

== Reception ==
Reviewing a 2011 recording of the piece and other Frances-Hoad compositions, Andrew Clements of The Guardian praised the work, saying it reveals "Frances-Hoad's ability to vary pace and mood just as she requires". Barry Witherden of BBC Music Magazine similarly remarked, "Refreshingly, on this evidence, Frances-Hoad's allegiances are to mainstream modernism, rather than the various popular post-modernist ‘isms’. Her compositions may tend towards the sternly ascetic, but they are full of feeling and memorable gestures. Ivan Hewett of The Daily Telegraph was slightly more critical, writing, "Frances-Hoad's skill at creating a rich texture from modest chamber forces is astonishing. But the Gothic strain can be oppressive, and isn’t always balanced by her lighter, witty side."

== Recordings ==
A recording of The Ogre Lover was released on 28 June 2011 through Champs Hill Records and features Frances-Hoad's other chamber works Memoria, My Fleeting Angel, The Snow Woman, Invocation, Bouleumata, Melancholia, and The Glory Tree.
