= Cello Concerto (Frances-Hoad) =

Composition by Cheryl Frances-Hoad

The Cello Concerto (Earth, Sea, Air) is a composition for solo cello and orchestra by the British composer Cheryl Frances-Hoad. The work was written in 2022 on a commission from BBC Radio 3. Its world premiere was performed by the cellist Laura van der Heijden and the BBC Scottish Symphony Orchestra conducted by Ryan Wigglesworth at Glasgow City Halls on 18 May 2023.

== Composition ==
The concerto has a duration of roughly 20 minutes and is cast in three movements played without pause:

1. Earth
2. Sea
3. Air

=== Instrumentation ===
The work is written for cello solo and a large orchestra consisting of two flutes, piccolo, two oboes, two clarinets, two bassoons, contrabassoon, four horns, two trumpets, piccolo trumpet, two trombones, bass trombone, tuba, timpani, two percussionists, harp, and strings.

== Reception ==
Reviewing the world premiere, Simon Thompson of The Times wrote, "[Frances-Hoad] has created a beautiful musical kaleidoscope of shifting colours and textures where the outer movements offer focused blasts of energy, both tectonic and ornithological, while the central slow movement is a gorgeous, shimmering seascape of slowly undulating lines and a vast sense of space." However, he criticized the balance between the soloist and orchestra, remarking, "For much of the piece's second half the cello was barely audible, subsumed into the orchestral sound in a way that rendered it almost irrelevant. That's a real shame, because Van der Heijden sounded terrific in the piece's opening, leading the sound with a powerful solo recitative that had all but evaporated by the piece's end."

Reviewing the premiere recording of the piece, Charlotte Gardner of Gramophone enthusiastically praised the piece, remarking:

It's a mighty, majestic, gripping work; full of theatre, colour and inventive textures and rhythmic writing, opening with a sharply ferocious volcanic punch that feels rather like nature’s postscript to the preceding Bridge; and as it proceeds, a brilliant vehicle for van der Heijden's ability to sing, declaim and glitter. It's also a score that demands, and here gets, a hand-in-glove relationship with the orchestra, which itself is very much the cellist's equal partner. The impression is of a major new addition to the canon, destined to take up permanent roost, and it couldn’t have hoped for more accomplished champions to set it out on its journey.

== Recording ==
A recording of the concerto performed by van der Heijden and the BBC Scottish Symphony Orchestra under Ryan Wigglesworth was released through Chandos Records in June 2024.
