= Peter Wooley =

American film producer (1934–2017)

Peter Wesley Wooley (December 26, 1934 – November 15, 2017) was an American film producer, author, director, and production designer with 85 films and television series to his credit, including the Mel Brooks' films Blazing Saddles and High Anxiety. He was nominated for an Emmy Award for Production Design of the movie The Day After.

Wooley was born in East Liverpool, Ohio, and entered the navy immediately upon graduating from high school. He studied architecture at Kent State.

He married Linda Lane, a singer who studied at the Pasadena Playhouse and performed at the Copacabana, and they had two children, Stephanie Wilson and musician Christopher Wooley.

Wooley began a career in architecture. He went to work in the movie industry in 1966 as a draftsman on the boards at Warner Brothers. He worked as a Set Designer at Warner Brothers and Universal Pictures. Wooley worked as an Assistant Art Director on several television series including Mod Squad. His first series as an Art Director was on the series My World and Welcome to It. Several television series followed and then a move into feature films. Wooley began a long-lasting working relationship with Mel Brooks and was the Production designer on Blazing Saddles and High Anxiety as well as the Brooks-produced film Fatso.

He was the author of the book What! And Give Up Show Business? and a novel called You Only Go 'Round Once.

== Filmography ==
- Going Home 1971
- Sounder 1972
- The Thief Who Came To Dinner 1972
- Cleopatra Jones 1973
- Blazing Saddles 1974
- Young Frankenstein 1974
- Sparkle 1976
- High Anxiety 1977
- Olly, Olly, Oxen Free 1978
- Fatso 1980
- Up the Academy 1980
- Second Hand Hearts 1981
- Under the Rainbow 1981
- Jekyll and Hyde...Together Again 1982
- The Day After 1983
- Hard to Hold 1984
- Oh God, You Devil 1984
- Porky's Revenge 1985
- Summer Rental 1985
- Six Against the Rock 1987
- The Neon Empire 1989
- Donor 1990
- Pure Luck 1991
- Lakota Moon 1992
- Hart to Hart 1994-95
- Hidden in Silence 1996
- One Man's Hero 1999
- A Mother's Testimony 2001
- Face Value 2002
- National Lampoon's Pucked 2006
- Least Among Saints 2012
