= Leonid Gorokhov =

Russian-born British-German cellist

The USSR-born British/German cellist Leonid Gorokhov (born 1967 in Leningrad) studied at the St. Petersburg Conservatoire with Anatoli Nikitin and took part in masterclasses with Daniil Shafran. Winner of Concertino Praga (First Prize) and Paris Chamber Music Competition (Premier Grand Prix), Leonid Gorokhov is the only Russian cellist to be awarded the Grand Prix and the First Prize of the Geneva Concours (1986). In 1995 the European Association for Encouragement of the Arts awarded the Cultural Achievement Prize to Leonid Gorokhov for exceptional talent and outstanding artistic accomplishment.

== Performance and recording career ==
Gorokhov has a flourishing international career and, although based in London, often returns to his roots to perform in his home city of St. Petersburg.

In 1991, Leonid Gorokhov appeared as soloist with the St. Petersburg Philharmonic conducted by Lord Menuhin; their strong musical rapport led to further concerto engagements with the Bergen, Berlin & Royal Philharmonic Orchestra, English Symphony Orchestra, Sinfonia Varsovia and the Zürich Tonhalle. In 1995, he made a triumphant return to Russia in performances of the Elgar Cello Concerto with the Philharmonia Hungarica, again conducted by Lord Menuhin.

Apart from his work as a soloist, he is a founder member of the Hermitage String Trio (playing with Boris Garlitsky, violin, and Alexander Zemstov, viola) and plays regularly as a duo with the pianists Nikolai Demidenko, Niklas Sivelov and Kathryn Stott. Duo recitals have included the Båstad, Belfast, Eilat Winter, Oslo Chamber Music and Petworth Festivals, Munich and Wigmore Hall.

Recent engagements have included the Elgar concerto with the Enescu Philharmonic in Bucharest and the Walton Concerto with the Philharmonia Orchestra in the UK. In Australia, his residence at the Townsville Festival found him playing a wide variety of chamber music; in Russia he has performed the rarely played Davidoff Concerto No 2 with the St. Petersburg Capella as well as concertos with the Moscow State Symphony Orchestra. He has appeared at the Athens Megaron and Bargemusic New York as well as at many prestigious festivals such as Budapest Spring, Corinthian Summer, Davos, Evian, Gstaad, Harrogate, Interlaken, Kuhmo, Ljubljana, Munich, Perth (Scotland), Schleswig-Holstein and Spoleto.

He undertakes regular recital tours of Japan and has played concertos with the Thailand Philharmonic Orchestra and the Macau Chamber Orchestra. In Europe he has been invited to play with the Basel, BBC Scottish, Berlin Radio, Biel-Bienne and Norrkoping Symphony Orchestras; the Prague Philharmonic Orchestra, Promusica Salzburg and the Orchestre de la Suisse Romande.

Future engagements include the Brahms Double Concerto in Germany and Spain, a further tour of Japan, duo recitals in the UK with Kathryn Stott, and concerts with the Hermitage String Trio, including a concert at the Wigmore Hall.

== Teaching ==
Gorokhov became a British Citizen in 1998. He is a professor at the Guildhall School of Music and at the Hochschule für Musik und Theater, Hannover, Germany.

Since 2008, Gorokhov has been teaching the BBC Young Musician 2012 finalist Laura van der Heijden. She proceeded to win the competition.

== Discography ==
Gorokhov's discography includes recordings of Boccherini, Debussy, Haydn, Kodály, Martinu, Shostakovich, Tchaikovsky and Tortelier for Melodiya. For Supraphon he has recorded concertos by Martinu and Saint-Saëns with the Brno Philharmonic Orchestra conducted by Lord Menuhin and an album of works by Prokofiev, Shostakovich, and Stravinsky. Rarely performed gems feature on "Russian Discoveries" on the Olympia label and "Virtuoso Cello Transcriptions" on Cello Classics. Leonid Gorokhov's first recording with Nikolai Demidenko was an all-Schubert album for the Munich-based AGPL label. This was followed by a recording of Schnittke, Rachmaninov and Shostakovich Sonatas on ASV Gold.
