= MasterWorks Festival =

Classical performing arts training program

The MasterWorks Festival is a month-long intensive summer training program for classical performing artists. Beginning in 2018, MasterWorks was held in Spartanburg, SC, USA, at Converse College. In fall 2022, MasterWorks announced that it would be moving to Campbellsville University, in Campbellsville, KY, for summer 2023.

== Mission ==
MasterWorks' vision statement is, "Equipping the classical performing arts world to know God and make Him known." Its mission is to "see the classical performing arts world full of the Love of God, and empowered with the message of Jesus Christ." The festival's purpose statement is to "train the next generation to be excellent in their artistry and their Christian witness and share that excellent performing artistry and impact with the community."

== History ==
The festival was co-founded in 1997 by the former artistic director of the Christian Performing Artists' Fellowship (CPAF), Dr. Patrick Kavanaugh and his wife Barbara, and by the trombonist James Kraft and his wife Mary Jeane. The festival began at the Houghton College in New York as a ministry of the CPAF. The festival's sponsor organization is the CPAF, which is "a multi-denominational ministry dedicated to performing and teaching the classical arts to the glory of God and to spreading the Gospel of Jesus Christ."

== Programs ==
MasterWorks Festival is operated on the campus of Campbellsville University. It focuses on intense artistic training and deep spiritual growth. MasterWorks offers master classes for classical musicians, dancers and actors instructed by world-renowned performing artists. It has featured performers such as Midori Goto, Christopher Parkening, Rebecca Wright, Rachel Barton Pine, Jeanette Clift George, John Dalley, Lawrence Dutton, Ann Schein, David Kim, Alan Chow, Anne Martindale Williams, David Hardy, Doug Yeo, Christine Smith, Steve Hendrickson, John Nelson, Phil Smith, Paula Robison, Stephen Clapp and the Ying String Quartet.

The MasterWorks Festival runs several programs, the largest of which is the Orchestra Program for students ages 14 to 26. There are also unique Intensive Study Programs for Strings, Piano, Winds and Voice. In addition, there is a Theatre program, a Film program, as well as a 3-day Choral program. Previously, the MasterWorks Festival had an Opera program and a Ballet program. MasterWorks also hosts a summer intensive technical internship program, which assists in productions throughout the festival.

== Expansion ==
In 2004, MasterWorks expanded outside the US and MasterWorks Europe took place in London, England. Since then, other non-USA MasterWorks Festivals have taken place in Winchester, England, and in China.
