= The Glory Tree =

Song cycle

The Glory Tree is a song cycle for solo soprano and chamber ensemble by the British composer Cheryl Frances-Hoad. It was first performed in the Purcell Room at the Southbank Centre in June 2005.

== Composition ==
The Glory Tree was inspired by Shamanic rituals and is set to the text of Old English poems, including Dream of the Rood and Judith. Frances-Hoad described the composition in the score program notes, writing:

Before a person can become initiated as a shaman, their spirit must travel to the three most important destinations in the spirit world, namely up to the heavens, across the sea, and down to the underworld, and it is these three journeys that the main three movements of the piece are based on. When I was researching shamanism, I came across a book that suggested that shamanic elements could be found in some Anglo Saxon poetry, and although this is debatable it gave me the perfect excuse to use excerpts from poems such as The Dream of the Rood and Judith as my texts, as I loved the magical and otherworldly sound of the language.

=== Structure ===
The Glory Tree has a duration of roughly 15 minutes and is composed in five connected movements:

1. "Behold! I shall tell the choicest of visions"
2. "Hail is the whitest of grains"
3. "I have often suffered on the weary seas"
4. "The sun is always a source of hope"
5. "What have you done, bloodstained one?"

Frances-Hoad detailed the structure of the composition, writing:

The piece is in five continuous movements, with the 1st, 3rd and 5th being the journeys to heaven, across the sea, then down to Hell, and the 2nd and 4th songs use the texts of Rune poems to link the three levels of the world – in the 2nd song, Icy Hail falls from the heavens and turns into water, and in the 4th, a boat travels across the water to reach the land, whereupon the last movement, the descent to hell, begins.

=== Instrumentation ===
The work is scored for a solo soprano, clarinet (doubling bass clarinet), violin, cello, and piano.

== Reception ==
Reviewing a 2011 recording of the piece, Andrew Clements of The Guardian lauded The Glory Tree, writing, "There's something engagingly freewheeling about Frances-Hoad's works, the feeling that she is quite unselfconscious about the music she writes and oblivious to how others might categorise it." Barry Witherden of BBC Music Magazine similarly remarked, "Refreshingly, on this evidence, Frances-Hoad's allegiances are to mainstream modernism, rather than the various popular post-modernist ‘isms’. Her compositions may tend towards the sternly ascetic, but they are full of feeling and memorable gestures. Ivan Hewett of The Daily Telegraph was slightly more critical, writing, "Frances-Hoad's skill at creating a rich texture from modest chamber forces is astonishing. But the Gothic strain can be oppressive, and isn’t always balanced by her lighter, witty side."

== Recordings ==
A recording of The Glory Tree was released on 28 June 2011 through Champs Hill Records and features Frances-Hoad's other chamber works Memoria, My Fleeting Angel, The Snow Woman, The Ogre Lover, Invocation, Bouleumata, and Melancholia.
