= Laura van der Heijden (musician) =

- Born: 7 April 1997 (age 28); West Sussex, England
- Genres: Classical
- Instrument: Cello
- Years active: 2005–present
- Website: www.lauravanderheijden.org

Laura van der Heijden (born 7 April 1997) is a British cellist. She won the 2012 BBC Young Musician of the Year competition.

Born in West Sussex, England, Van der Heijden is the youngest daughter of a Dutch father and Swiss mother. Her musical studies began at age 4 on recorder, then piano at age 5 and cello at age 6. In 2005, she joined the junior department of the Royal College of Music, where she studied piano under Emily Jeffrey. Her first public performance was at age nine with Forest Row's Jupiter Chamber Orchestra. She has been a pupil of Leonid Gorokhov since 2008.

In 2010, Van der Heijden won the Erster Preis mit Auszeichnung (first prize with distinction) and a special prize in the final of the Swiss National Youth Music Competition, which led to her performing the Boccherini Cello Concerto in G with the Zurich Chamber Orchestra at the Zurich Tonhalle in January 2011. She was also the 2011 winner of the Marjorie Humby competition at the Royal College of Music and was awarded the 2012 Director's Prize at RCM Junior Department. Van der Heijden won the BBC Young Musician of the Year on 13 May 2012, where in the final round, she played William Walton's Cello Concerto with Kirill Karabits and the now Royal Northern Sinfonia, on a 1911 Celeste Farotti cello loaned to her by Gorokhov.

Van der Heijden currently plays on a late 17th Century cello made by Francesco Rugeri of Cremona. She previously performed on a 1935 cello by Galileo Arcellaschi and a 1987 cello by Colin Irving. She became an Ambassador for Children & the Arts in January 2013. In 2018 she released her debut album entitled 1948, which subsequently won the 2018 Edison Klassiek Award. In 2019 she won BBC Music Magazine's Newcomer of the Year Award. Van der Heijden graduated from St John's College, Cambridge in 2019. On 18 February 2022, she released her latest album Pohádka: Tales From Prague To Budapest with the pianist Jâms Coleman, on the Chandos Label.

Her most recent recording included the world premiere of Cheryl Frances-Hoad's cello concerto Earth, Sea, Air in 2023 with the BBC Scottish Symphony Orchestra. Laura subsequently took to the stage of the Royal Albert Hall with the orchestra and conductor Ryan Wigglesworth to perform the work at the BBC Proms in 2024.

She lives in Forest Row, East Sussex.
