= Nina Šenk =

Slovenian composer (born 1982)

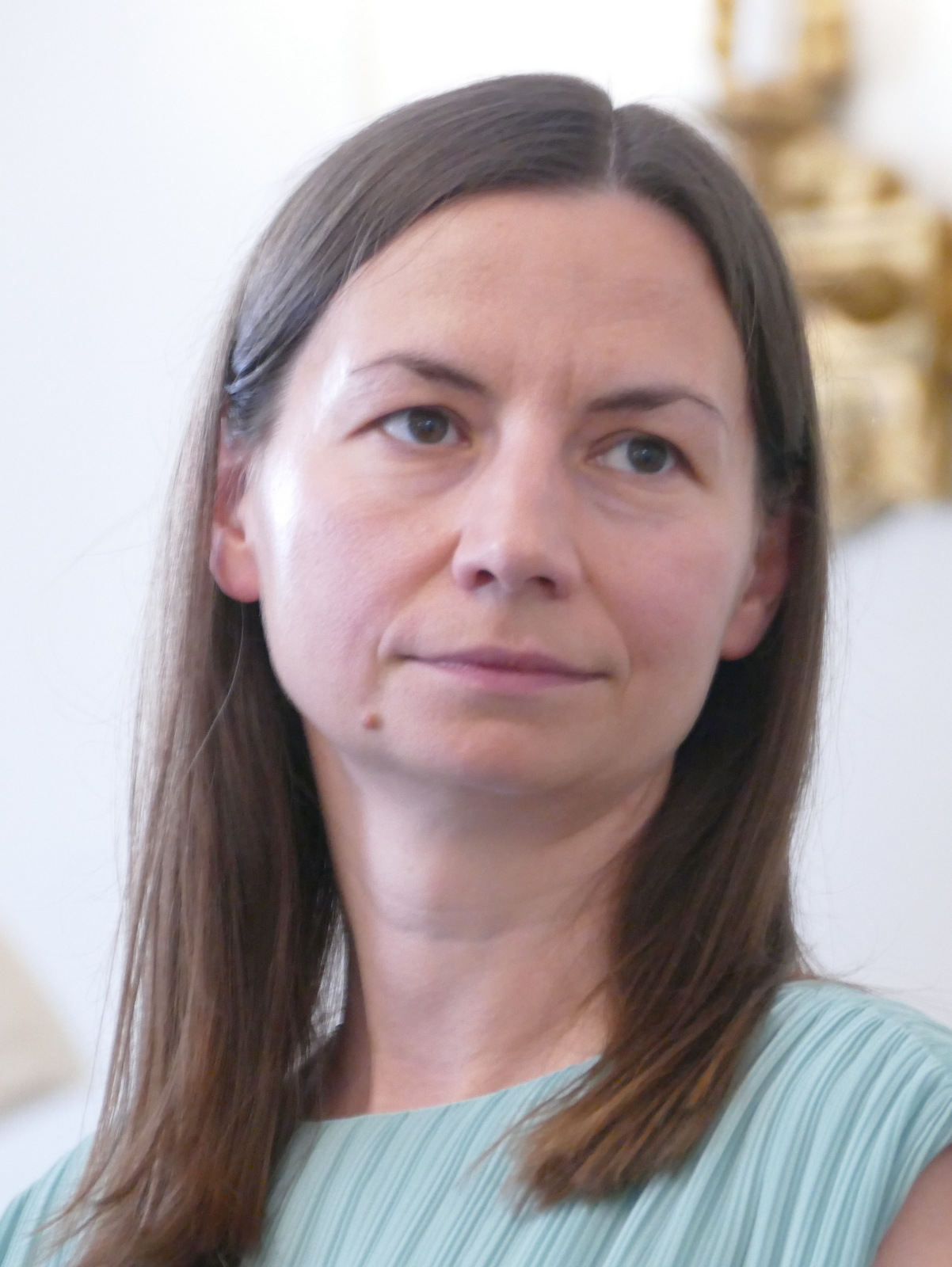
Nina Šenk

Nina Šenk (born 14 February 1982) is a classical Slovenian composer. In 2004, while still studying at the University of Ljubljana, she won first prize at the Young Euro Classic Festival in Berlin for her Violin Concerto No. 1. Her works have been performed at many music festivals and with various orchestras and ensembles around the world.

== Biography ==
After studying composition under Pavel Mihelčič in Ljubljana, Šenk moved to Dresden where she undertook postgraduate studies under Lothar Voigtländer. In 2008, she earned a master's degree at the University of Music and Performing Arts in Munich where her professor was Matthias Pintscher. After winning the Young Euro Classic prize in 2004, she was awarded the chamber music prize at the 2008 Weimar Spring Festival for Contemporary Music (Weimarer Frühlingstage) with her "Movimento fluido". From 2008 to 2010, she was composer in residence at the State Theatre in Cottbus, Germany, where she wrote her Second Violin Concerto. Her work Baca was commissioned for the BBC Proms, the first work by a Slovenian composer to be featured. Šenk was elected to the Slovenian Academy of Sciences and Arts in 2019 as its youngest member and first female musician.

== Awards ==
- European Prize for Best Composition, Young Euro Classic Festival (Concerto for Violin and Orchestra), 2004
- Prešeren Fund Prize, 2017
- Johann Joseph Fux Opera Composition Competition (Canvas), 2022
- Erste Bank Composition Award, 2024
