= Stephanie Wilson (executive) =

American theatre director, arts advocate, and non-profit fundraiser

- Born: 25 May 1957 (age 68); Los Angeles, United States
- Occupations: Theatre director, producer, non-profit executive
- Years active: 1974-present
- Organization(s): New West Symphony, Gold Coast Performing Arts Association

Stephanie Lin Wilson (née Wooley, formerly Angelini, born May 25, 1957), CFRE is an American theatre director, arts advocate, and non-profit fundraiser. She served as a commissioner for the City of Thousand Oaks Cultural Affairs Commission until 2020, and now serves on the City of Simi Valley Cultural Affairs Commission. She is the managing director of Will Geer Theatricum Botanicum and the artistic director of the Gold Coast Performing Arts Association. She was recently the deputy director of the New West Symphony.

As a Los Angeles-based theatre producer, Wilson has been active for over 40 years, earning several awards for her Equity theater productions and her work in the non-profit community. Her productions have been nominated for two Ovation Awards.

== Early life ==
Born in Los Angeles to Hollywood production designer Peter Wooley and singer Linda Wooley, Wilson attended Taft High School where she was a member of the drama department and directed several plays. Because of her father’s career as a successful production designer, she traveled often and switched schools regularly. Wilson claims that she first learned the entertainment business by “stowing away in the back of her father’s car.” Because of this, she was able to gain employment in several film productions, notably as the stunt double for a sheepdog on the Katharine Hepburn film Olly Olly Oxen Free which her father also worked on. Wilson studied film theory at Sonoma State University in Northern California.

== Career ==
After a period acting in local plays and theater productions, Wilson directed several plays leading up to the 1984 Summer Olympics as part of the Los Angeles Olympic Arts Festival and gained notability as a director as well as performer.

After the Olympic Arts Festival, Wilson became the founding artistic director of the Encino Playhouse in the San Fernando Valley in Los Angeles, producing numerous Equity plays as well as gaining a name in children’s theatre, which she would later utilize as the artistic director of Gold Coast Theatre Conservatory. Wilson would remain at the Encino playhouse until 1992, eventually moving to Thousand Oaks with her three children and starting the Gold Coast Performing Arts Association.

In the period before becoming director of development at the New West Symphony, Wilson was involved in capital campaigns for numerous non-profit organizations including an NPR Station at California Lutheran University, and the building for the Ventura County Community Foundation. She served as vice president of development for Partners in Care Foundation.

Wilson became artistic director of Gold Coast Plays and Theatre Conservatory in 1997. She also served as one of the founding members of the Thousand Oaks Cultural Affairs Commission and on the Thousand Oaks Civic Arts Plaza Board of Governors from 1999 to 2007. Wilson has chaired the board of directors for the California Alliance for Arts Education, Ventura County Arts Council and Social Justice Fund for Ventura County. She served for four years as deputy director and director of development for The New West Symphony, based in Thousand Oaks.

Wilson earned the CFRE (Certified Fund Raising Executive) designation, one of 5,500 fundraising professionals worldwide to hold the CFRE designation. In 2023, she became treasurer of the Board of Directors of the Santa Barbara and Ventura Counties Association of Fundraising Professionals.
