= Christian Performing Artists' Fellowship =

Christian ministry for classical performing arts world

The Christian Performing Artists' Fellowship (CPAF) is a non-profit, trans-denominational Christian ministry, dedicated to the classical performing arts world. CPAF is based in Winona Lake, Indiana, home of evangelist Billy Sunday, Youth for Christ and was the location of many early Billy Graham crusades. Co-founded in 1979 in the D.C. Area by former Artistic Director and author of Spiritual Lives of the Great Composers, Dr. Patrick Kavanaugh and his wife Barbara, and by trombonist James Kraft and his wife Mary Jeane, it is one of only two organizations in the United States dedicated to this particular mission field.

== History ==
CPAF publicly debuted in 1984 with a series of evangelistic concerts, performed by their group The Asaph Ensemble. The concerts featured musicians, opera singers and dancers. In 1987, as the popularity of their concerts increased, they began booking shows at the Kennedy Center in Washington D.C., and featuring prominent guest soloists such as Metropolitan Opera singer, Jerome Hines. Their increased popularity gave way to performance opportunities outside of not only the D.C. Area, but the United States. In 1992, in their very first overseas excursions, CPAF took part in Jerome Hines' opera I Am the Way at the Bolshoi Theatre in Moscow, Russia. They began to gain national acclaim in magazines and their notoriety continued to increase with their annual Christmas production of Handel's Messiah, which they performed for fourteen consecutive years. In 1996, the Asaph Ensemble was invited to Israel to perform on Christmas Eve in Bethlehem Square. Coverage on their presentation was shown around the world on CNN and other television networks.

CPAF was solely a volunteer organization from 1984 until Dr. Kavanaugh and his wife began CPAF as a full-time ministry in 1988. As CPAF increased, so did its vision and the Masterworks festival (MWF), a month-long intensive summer training program for classical performing artists, was developed to carry out the vision of CPAF through younger generations. The first MWF took place in 1997 at Houghton College, Houghton, New York. In the summer of 2002, MWF moved to Grace College in Winona Lake, Indiana. After two successful summer festivals there, MWF and CPAF permanently relocated their headquarters to Winona Lake. In 2004 MasterWorks Europe was established and took place in London, England. Since then, non-USA MasterWorks Festivals have also taken place at Winchester, England and Zhengzhou, China. Plans for MasterWorks Festivals around the globe are currently in the process of development.

== Ministry ==
The three unique characteristics of CPAF's ministry are Evangelism, a very high standard of Excellence, and work within the Classical Performing Arts.

In addition to the MasterWorks Festival, CPAF sponsors the Second Sunday Series, a series of once monthly, community concerts in which performers share their faith through classical music, drama and dance. CPAF has begun numerous Bible Studies and prayer groups throughout colleges and performing arts arenas around the United States.

== Arts Administration ==
In 2004, CPAF established an intern teaching program. The year-long program is designed for young performing artists to train, both spiritually and artistically, in arts administration.

== Training and Production ==
CPAF also trains young performers and theatre technicians through a number of technical internship programs held in the summer including, Production, Orchestra Management, Photography, Piano maintenance, Recording and the supporting areas of General Production. The internships assist in the productions that appear in the MasterWorks Festival.

== Leadership ==
A Bible Study Leadership Training Program is held during the MasterWorks Festival. This program trains performing artists to start Bible studies in their academic and artistic organizations.
