= Galina Grigorjeva =

Estonian composer

Galina Grigorjeva (Ukrainian: Галина Григорьєва, born 2 December 1962 in Simferopol, Ukraine) is an Estonian composer of Ukrainian origin.

She studied at Odesa Conservatory, and in 1991 she graduated from St. Petersburg Conservatory.

In 2014, she was awarded with Order of the White Star, IV class.

Grigorjeva has received a number of awards, including the Heino Eller Music Prize and the Lepo Sumera Composer Prize, and in 2015 her CD "In Paradisum" won the prize for best classical album at the Eesti Muusikaauhinnad (Estonian Music Prize).

== Musical Style ==
Although a contemporary composer, Grigorjeva’s music uses the subtle and animated melodic styles reflecting influences from early European polyphony and Slavonic sacred music. Choral compositions are deeply rooted in the traditions of the Orthodox Church and ancient Russian and Slavonic folklore.

== Works ==
- Liturgie de St Jean Chrysostome (1971)
- Musica Liturgica De La Iglesia Ortodoxa Rusa (1977)
- Poly-phonie for piano (1998)
- Na ishod (1999)
- Con misterio (2001)
- Recitativo accompagnato (2003)
- There Is a Time for Autumn for 6 percussionists (2004)
- Hocetus (2004)
- Valge prelüüd (White Prelude: Imitating Monsieur Couperin) for baroque viola (2006)
- Aria (2007)
- Ad infinitum (2008)
- Hortus Musicus (2008)
- Schwarz-weiß Prelude for piano and cello (2009)
- Nox vitae for mixed choir (2010)
- In Paradisum (2014)
- Nature Morte (2016)
- New Estonian Orchestral Music (2017)
- Music For Male Voice Choir (2023)
