= Gérard Pesson =

French composer (born 1958)

- Born: 17 January 1958 (age 67)
- Origin: Torteron, France
- Genres: Contemporary classical music
- Occupation: Composer
- Labels: Naive, Stradivarius, Aeon

Gérard Pesson (born 17 January 1958 in Torteron) is a French composer. Pesson studied musicology at the Sorbonne and is the composer of a number of award-winning works.

== Works ==
- Affûts pour 4 percussions (2001)
- Aggravations et final pour orchestre (2002)
- Berceuses à bas voltage (4) pour grand orchestre (1998)
- Branle du Poitou pour piano et 8 instruments (1997)
- Bruissant divisé pour violon et violoncelle (1998)
- Butterfly le nom, scène lyrique pour soprano, chœur d'hommes et petit orchestre (1995)
- Butterfly's Note book pour piano (1995/98)
- Cantate égale pays n°1 (Jachère aidant) pour voix, ensemble et électronique (2010)
- Cantate égale pays n°2 (God's Grandeur) pour voix, ensemble et électronique (2010)
- Cantate égale pays n°3 (Gd Mmré) pour voix, ensemble et électronique (2010)
- Cassation pour clarinette, trio à cordes et piano (2003)
- Carmagnole pour ensemble (2015)
- Chansons (5) pour mezzo-soprano et 5 instruments (1999)
- Chants populaires pour chœur (2008)
- Colophon (ritournelle à quatre voix sur une corde) pour violoncelle (2007)
- Contra me (miserere) pour ensemble vocal et instrumental (2002)
- De Loup & d'estoc (bergeries sur le fil) pour 2 violoncelles (2007)
- Dispositions furtives pour 2 pianos amplifiés (1988)
- Ecrit à Qinzhou pour récitant(e) et piano (1994)
- Études pour orgue baroque (3) (1998)
- Folies d'Espagne pour piano (1997)
- Forever Valley, opéra pour 7 chanteurs, comédienne et 6 instruments (1999/00)
- Fureur contre informe pour un tombeau d'Anatole pour trio à cordes (1998)
- Gigue pour 6 percussions (2001)
- In nomine pour 7 instruments (2001)
- Kein deutscher Himmel (transcription de l'Adagietto de la 5e Symphonie de Gustav Mahler) pour chœur mixte (1996/97)
- La Lumière n'a pas de bras pour nous porter pour piano (1994/95)
- La vita è come l'albero di Natale (d'après un fragment de Claude Debussy) pour violon et piano (1992)
- Le Gel, par jeu pour sextuor (1991)
- Le Grand Quinconce pour grand orchestre (1988)
- Les Chants Faëz pour piano principal et 11 instruments (1986)
- Mélodies carthaginoises (2) pour baryton et piano (1992)
- Mes béatitudes pour piano, violon, alto et violoncelle (1994/95)
- My Creative Method pour alto (2014)
- Nebenstück (d'après la 4e Ballade op.10 de Johannes Brahms) pour clarinette et quatuor à cordes (1998)
- Neige bagatelle pour guitare, violoncelle et piano (2002)
- Ne pas oublier coq rouge dans jour craquelé (moments Proust) pour violon, violoncelle et piano (2010)
- Nocturnes en quatuor pour clarinette, violon, violoncelle et piano (1987)
- Non sapremo mai di questo mi (d'après un fragment de Mozart) pour flûte, violon et piano (1991)
- Panorama, particolari e licenza (d'après Harold en Italie d'Hector Berlioz) pour alto, voix d'alto et neuf instruments (2006)
- Paraphernalia pour 2 altos (2009)
- Pastorale pour soli, chœur et orchestre (2006)
- Peigner le vif pour alto et accordéon (2007)
- Petites études mélancoliques (3) pour piano (1991)
- Poèmes de Sandro Penna (5) pour baryton, clarinette basse, cor, violon et violoncelle (1991/92)
- Preuve par la neige pour chœur (2004)
- Purple programme pour soprano, clarinette basse et percussion (1994)
- Quatuor à cordes n°1 Respirez ne respirez plus pour 2 violons, alto et violoncelle (1993)
- Quatuor à cordes n°2 Bitume (sérénade chevauchée) pour 2 violons, alto et violoncelle (2008)
- Rebus (pro rebus Harry Vogti) pour flûte, clarinette, violon, alto et violoncelle (1999)
- Récréations françaises pour sextuor (1993/95)
- Rescousses pour orchestre (2005)
- Sincère sur le mur atonal pour saxophone, violon et violoncelle (2014)
- Solitaire Mikado pour baryton et piano (2016)
- Sonate à quatre pour 2 flûtes à bec, violon et violoncelle (1996)
- Sur-le-champ pour 4 chanteurs et 8 instruments (1994)
- Un peu de fièvre pour 12 instruments (1995)
- Vexierbilder Rom pour piano (1991/95)
- Vexierbilder II pour piano (2003)
- Wunderblock (Nebenstück II) pour accordéon et orchestre (2005)
