= Gity Razaz =

American composer of Iranian origin

Gity Razaz is an American composer of Iranian origin. She has written music for symphony orchestra, opera, ballet, chamber ensemble, and solo instrumentalist, as well as pieces with multimedia and electroacoustic elements.

== Life and career ==
Gity Razaz began her classical training at the age of seven, and graduated with bachelor's and master's degrees in music composition from The Juilliard School where she studied with John Corigliano, Samuel Adler, and Robert Beaser. She was the composer-in-residence at the inaugural season of National Sawdust from 2016 to 2017. Pulitzer Prize-winning composer John Corigliano has called her a "unique composer whose 'Middle-Eastern roots have merged with her Western sensibilities to produce music that is both original and startling. She is on her way to becoming a major force in contemporary music.'" Her music has been described by The New York Times as "ravishing and engulfing" and possessing "an uncompromising beauty" by BBC Music Magazine.

Razaz's music has been performed throughout the United States and internationally, including at London's Royal Albert Hall for the Last Night of the 2021 BBC Proms, Carnegie Hall, National Sawdust, The Jerome L. Greene Space at New York Public Radio, Ballet Moscow, Canada's National Ballet School, Amsterdam Cello Biennale, Pioneer Works, and Le Poisson Rouge, among others. Her first chamber opera, Fault Lines, was commissioned by the Washington National Opera and premiered at the Kennedy Center in 2018 and her Cadenza for the Once Young was featured on BBC Radio 3's programme In Tune.

Cellist Alisa Weilerstein commissioned Razaz to write a piece for her FRAGMENTS project, the League of American Orchestras awarded her a Virginia B. Toulmin commission for San Diego Symphony, NAC Orchestra of Canada, Berkeley Symphony, Rochester Philharmonic, and Akron Symphony. The Seattle Symphony has presented her music on its concert "Music Beyond Borders: Music from the Seven" and included it in the inaugural season of Octave 9: Raisbeck Music Center. She also was a host for WQXR 93.9 FM New York's internet station Q2 Music, where she presented works of contemporary classical music.

== Selected works ==
=== Solo ===
- Creation of the Birds (2023) for violin
- Embroidering the Earth’s Mantle (2023) for viola
- Solar Music (2023) for cello
- Towards the Tower (2023) for double bass
- Secrets, Invocations (2022) for cello
- Fragmentation of Memory (2022) for piano
- Beauty of America (2021) for piano
- Song & Whispers (2020) for viola
- Spellbound (2020) for viola
- Round and Round Until Next Sunlight (2020) for violin
- Cadenza for the Once Young (2018) for violin
- Legend of Sigh (2015) for cello, pre-recorded cello, electronics
- Shadow Lines (2014) for cello, pre-recorded cello, electronics
- Light (2014) for piano
- Aleph (2012) for cello

=== Chamber ===
- Blue of Silence (2021) for violin, piano, electronics
- Four Tableaux for Sextet (2021) for violin, cello, clarinet, saxophone, piano, percussion
- String Quartet No. 2 (2018) for string quartet
- Four Haikus (2017) for guitar duo
- The Kreutzer Sonata (the suite version) (2017) for 2 violins, viola, cello, clarinet, piano
- A Prayer for the Abandoned (2015) for piano trio
- Wave Ring Duet (2014) for clarinet, bass clarinet, electronics
- Trout Remix (2014) for piano quintet
- Mallet Quartet (2013) for 2 marimbas and 2 vibraphones
- Piano Quintet based on three Poems by Baudelaire (2012) for piano quintet (composed for modern ballet)
- The Strange Highway (2011) for cello octet
- Chance Has Spoken (2011) for (composed for modern ballet) vibraphone, string quartet
- Apparition (2010) for harp, flute, clarinet
- Duo (2007) for violin, piano
- Sonata for Wind Quintet (2007) for woodwind quintet
- String Quartet No. 1 (2006) for string quartet

=== Orchestral ===
- Methuselah (In Chains of Time) (2023) for symphony orchestra
- Concerto for Flute and String Orchestra (2023) for solo flute, string orchestra
- Mother (2021) for chamber orchestra
- Echoes of Isolation (2021) for symphony orchestra
- And the Brightest Rivers Glide (2019) for symphony orchestra
- Flight of Faith (2017) for tenor, orchestra
- Cathedral Rock (2016) for string orchestra
- Arizona Dreams (2015) for string Orchestra
- Metamorphosis of Narcissus (2011) for chamber orchestra, electronics
- In The Midst of Flux (2009) for symphony orchestra
- Double Exposure (2009) for solo violin, chamber orchestra
- Concertino for Clarinet and Chamber Orchestra (2007) for solo clarinet, chamber orchestra

=== Vocal ===
- Flowing Down the Widening Rings of Being (2024) for tenor, clarinet, string quartet, harp, piano
- She Sings (2020) for SSAA chorus, string trio
- Fault Lines (2017) for opera for 4 voices, chamber orchestra
- Lucea, Jamaica (2017) for mezzo-soprano, piano
- Lux Aeterna (2016) for a cappella choir
- The Call Across the Valley of Not-Knowing (2014) for soprano, baritone, cello, clarinet, piano
- The Yellow Wallpaper Songs (2012) for soprano, violin, cello, piano
- Songs from the Book of Nightmares (2008) for soprano, oboe, clarinet, horn, piano

=== Ballet ===
- The Kreutzer Sonata (2017) for two violins, viola, cello, clarinet, and piano
- Wave Ring (2014) for violin, cello, clarinet, piano, and pre-recorded electronics
- Chance Has Spoken (2011) for vibraphone and string quartet
