= Rosa Briceño Ortiz =

Venezuelan conductor

- Born: April 25, 1957
- Origin: Venezuela
- Died: May 29, 2018 (aged 61)
- Occupations: Conductor and educator
- Formerly of: Orquesta Sinfónica Simón Bolívar

Rosa Briceño Ortiz (26 April 1957 – 29 May 2018) was a Venezuelan conductor and educator.

== Biography ==
A native of Caracas, Briceño studied with Gonzalo Castellanos, becoming his first female pupil, and graduated from the Accademia de Musicale Chigiana in Italy. In 1994 she became the first woman to lead the Banda Marcial Caracas. At various points in her career she was offered the directorship of groups in Brazil, Colombia, and Argentina; she also served on the board of the World Band Association, and acted as regional coordinator for Latin America for the Latin American Music Center. A specialist in repertoire for wind band, at one time she served as director of the Escuela de Música José Ángel Lamas, where she taught for over 25 years. In 1983 she directed the Orquesta Sinfónica Simón Bolívar for the first time, thus becoming the first Venezuelan woman to lead a symphony orchestra in Venezuela. In 2018 she suffered a cerebral edema and underwent emergency brain surgery. She died of leukemia. Briceño was awarded the Emma Soler Award for services to culture in 2017.
