= Elizabeth Rowe (flutist) =

American flutist (born 1974)

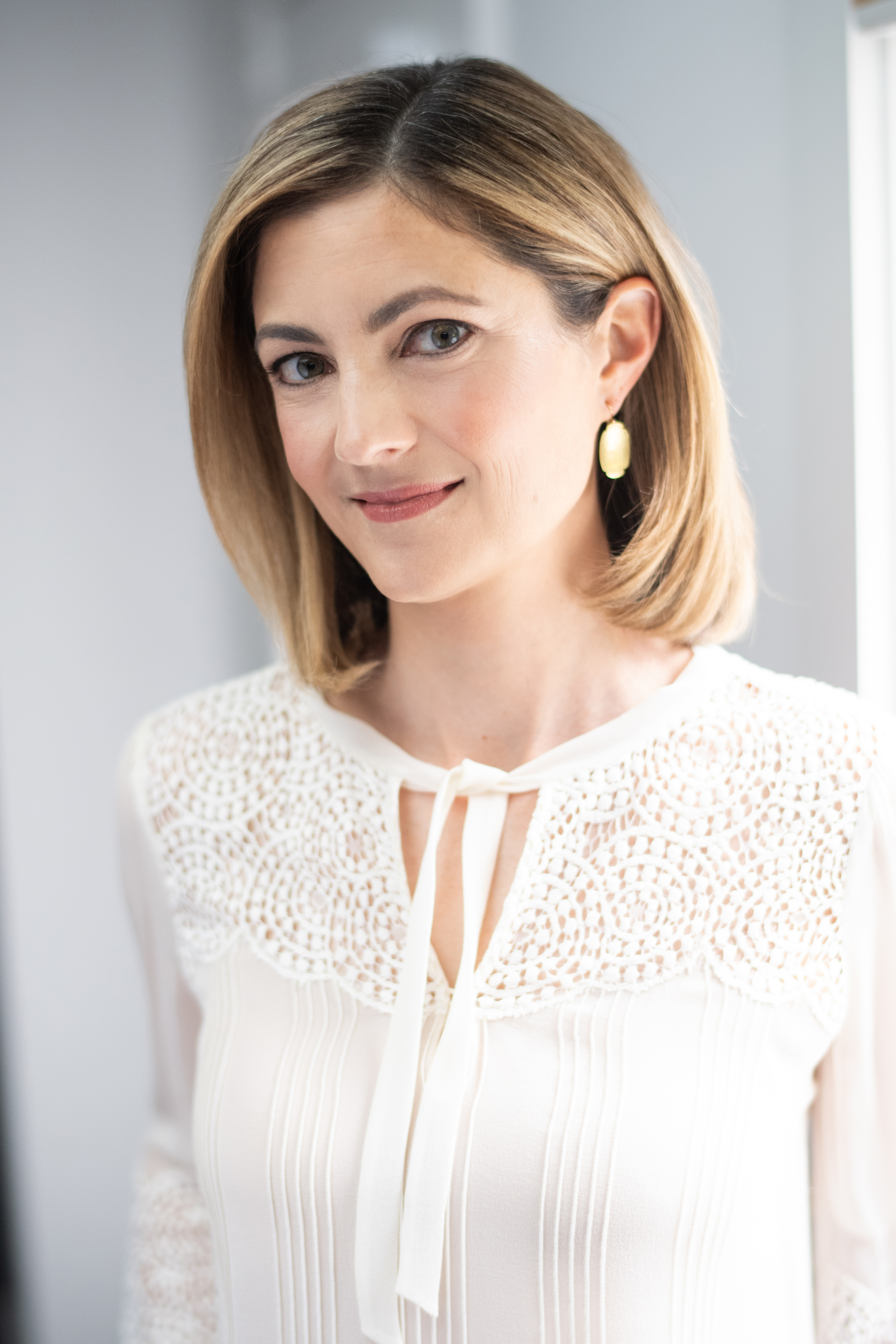

Background information
- Born: 1974 (age 51–52)
- Genre: Classical
- Occupations: Leadership Coach; Former Principal Flutist of the Boston Symphony Orchestra
- Instrument: Flute
- Website: Official website
- Known for: Gender discrimination lawsuit

Elizabeth Rowe (born 1974) is an American flutist and leadership coach, known for being the principal flutist of the Boston Symphony Orchestra from 2004 to 2024 and for a gender discrimination lawsuit.

Rowe grew up in Oregon where she started playing the flute as a child. She earned a music degree and has held several titled positions with professional orchestras. In 2004, she won a blind audition against 250 other applicants to become the principal flutist of the Boston Symphony Orchestra.

In 2018, she filed a gender discrimination lawsuit against the Boston Symphony Orchestra alleging she was paid less on account of her gender. The case was settled out of court in February 2019.

Rowe retired from the Boston Symphony at the end of the 2024 Tanglewood season, in order to focus on her work as a leadership coach.

== Early life and education ==
Rowe was born in 1974 and grew up in Eugene, Oregon. Her parents were both college professors with an interest in music. She started studying the flute when she was 7 years old. Rowe earned a degree in music from the University of Southern California. She was also a fellow at the Tanglewood Music Center.

== Career ==
In 1998, when Rowe was 23 years old, she was hired as the principal flutist of the Fort Wayne Philharmonic Orchestra. This was followed by positions with the Baltimore Symphony Orchestra and the National Symphony Orchestra in Washington D.C. Rowe also played with the New World Symphony and was on the faculty of the New England Conservatory of Music as of 2018.

In 2004, at age 29, Rowe won a blind audition against 250 other flute players for the principal flute position with the Boston Symphony Orchestra (BSO), which is one of the "Big Five" famous American orchestras. Her husband also joined the BSO in 2006. As of 2018, Rowe had been a concerto soloist in 28 BSO concerts. She was also frequently used as a spokesperson in their publicity and marketing efforts.

=== Discrimination lawsuit ===
Rowe filed a gender discrimination lawsuit against the Boston Symphony Orchestra in July 2018. Her lawsuit is believed to be the first gender discrimination suit filed under the Massachusetts Equal Pay Act, a law that went into effect in July 2018. The lawsuit prompted public discussion about gender biases in the classical music industry.

The basis of the lawsuit was that Rowe was paid about $70,000 less than the male principal oboist she sat next to. Rowe claimed this was because of her gender, while the BSO claimed oboists were more expensive than flutists due to market forces. Rowe and the BSO entered mediation in December 2018, and the lawsuit was settled out of court for an undisclosed amount in February 2019.

=== Leadership Coaching ===
Rowe retired from the Boston Symphony at the end of the 2024 Tanglewood season, in order to focus on her work as a leadership coach.
