= Last Man Standing (song cycle) =

Song cycle by Cheryl Frances-Hoad

Last Man Standing is a song cycle for baritone and orchestra written in 2018 by the British composer Cheryl Frances-Hoad and set to a text by Tamsin Collison. The work was commissioned by BBC Radio 3 and was first performed by the baritone Marcus Farnsworth and the BBC Symphony Orchestra conducted by Martyn Brabbins at the Barbican Centre on 30 November 2018.

== Composition ==
=== Background ===
Last Man Standing has a duration of about 28 minutes is cast in fifteen untitled songs. The libretto describes the experiences of an anonymous soldier, whom the composer described as an "Everytommy," who enlists to fight in World War I. Cheryl Frances-Hoad and Tamsin Collinson, who had previously collaborated on the chamber opera Love Bytes in 2012, originally intended to base the text on the memoirs of Siegfried Sassoon, but soon elected for a nameless protagonist who could "represent men of every rank and class." They spent three years studying various letters, novels, poetry, firsthand accounts, and other media about World War I, citing the BBC's 1964 documentary series The Great War and Joan Littlewood's 1963 satirical musical Oh, What a Lovely War! as particularly influential sources. The score therefor references numerous contemporaneous musical sources, such as bugle calls, music hall ditties, and soldiers' songs, among other musical effects. Collinson also used poppies as a narrative framing device due to their significance as a wartime remembrance and thus drew further influence from Nicholas J. Saunders's 2013 book The Poppy: From Ancient Egypt to Flanders Fields to Afghanistan.

=== Instrumentation ===
The work is scored for solo baritone and a large orchestra comprising piccolo, two flutes (2nd doubling piccolo), two oboes, cor anglais, two clarinets (2nd doubling E♭ clarinet), bass clarinet (doubling clarinet), two bassoons, contrabassoons, four horns, three trumpets (1st doubling piccolo trumpet), two trombones, bass trombone, tuba, timpani, two harps, four percussionists, celesta, and strings.

== Reception ==
Last Man Standing drew a mixed response from music critics. Fellow composer and journalist Robert Hugill favorably described the piece as "more of a monodrama, almost an opera, than a song cycle" and wrote, "It was this orchestra writing which gave the work its strength, if our ordinary soldier was unable to express himself in large-scale complex texts then the compensation was the orchestra commented and gave us a different point of view." He added, "This was a long piece, over 30 minutes, but it never felt it and all concerned gave a fully committed and very engaged performance." Colin Anderson of Classical Source also praised the piece, remarking, "In a score full of wartime onomatopoeia – bugle-calls, drums, whistles, marches – and, borrowed or created, the use of soldiers' and popular songs (including 'Auld Lang Syne' on horn, harmonised bleakly), there is no doubting the sincerity of Frances-Hoad's setting, music of eerie quiet, lyrical eloquence, proud declarations of duty, the summoning to battle, and mood-swings reflecting the horrors of conflagration, a roll-call of losses – come together for a sinister musical cabaret musing on something all too real, musically engrossing and moving."

Andrew Clements of The Guardian was more critical of the work, however, writing that it "never convinces either as music theatre or a song cycle." He continued:

The chameleon-like nature of Frances-Hoad's music can be one of its most appealing qualities, but here that seems too arbitrary, and becomes just an easy, almost hackneyed way of triggering stock responses to the horrors of warfare. The opening and closing numbers are pastiches of Butterworth's Housman settings, while elsewhere the reliance on soldiers' songs – When This Lousy War Is Over; We're Here Because We're Here – seems too obviously borrowed from Joan Littlewood's Oh! What a Lovely War. There are a couple of striking orchestral passages, as well as an interlude based upon Auld Lang Syne (which goes on just a bit too long), but they don't really add up to enough.

Last Man Standing was similarly criticized by Paul Driver of The Sunday Times.
