= Suzanne Farrin =

American composer (born 1976)

- Born: 1976 (age 49–50)
- Education: University of Colorado Boulder; Yale School of Music
- Occupations: Composer; ondist
- Employer: Purchase College; City University of New York
- Spouse: Sebastián Zubieta
- Children: 2
- Awards: Guggenheim Fellowship (2019)
- Musical career
- Genres: Classical music
- Label: New Focus Recordings

Suzanne Farrin (born 1976) is an American composer and ondist. A 2019 Guggenheim Fellow, she is Frayda B. Lindemann Professor of Music at CUNY Graduate Center and Hunter College, and she has released two albums from New Focus Recordings.

== Biography ==
Suzanne Farrin, from North Yarmouth, Maine, was born in 1976, and as a teenager she moved to coastal Massachusetts and then to Colorado; she cites her experiences in the former state as an inspiration in her work. Her grandparents inspired her interest in music, and she was a keyboardist for her school's MIDI band, working with the encouragement of that band's director.

After obtaining her BM from the University of Colorado Boulder in 1998, she attended Yale School of Music, where she got her MM in 2000, MMA in 2003, and DMA in 2008. Martin Bresnick, Ezra Laderman, Joseph Schwantner, and Evan Ziporyn were her teachers at Yale.

In 2007, she began writing solo piano pieces with "Empty Chariots". She has released two albums from New Focus Recordings: Corpo di Terra (2012), inspired by the poetry of Petrarch; and Dolce la Morte, inspired by Michelangelo's poetry towards Tommaso dei Cavalieri. In 2019, she was awarded a Guggenheim Fellow in Music Composition.

She considers composing to be "a way of approaching life, a view of the world" and "think[s] of it as an act, a habit". One of the recurring themes in her music is her love for the city of Rome. The Courier Journal said that she was "widely recognized [for] imaginatively us[ing] electronic instruments in her work".

She also performs the ondes Martenot, a Theremin-like electronic musical instrument. She appeared in her capacity as a ondist on the films Blockage (2017) and Chicuarotes (2019).

She starting teaching at the Purchase College Conservatory of Music, where she was also chair of the department of composition. She later moved to the City University of New York, where she became Frayda B. Lindemann Professor of Music at CUNY Graduate Center and Hunter College. In 2016, she was artist-in-residence at the Loretto Project in Kentucky.

Her husband Sebastián Zubieta, whom she met during her time at Yale, has served as the music director for Americas Society. As of 2007, she lived in Manhattan. She has two children.

She speaks Rioplatense Spanish, having done so since the late-1990s.

== Discography ==
Title	Year	Details	Ref.
Corpo di Terra	2012	Release: November 15, 2012; Label: New Focus Recordings	
Dolce la Morte	2018	Release: November 2, 2018; Label: New Focus Recordings	
