= Patrick Kavanaugh =

American conductor (1954–2018)

Patrick Kavanaugh (October 20, 1954 – April 2, 2018) was a composer, conductor, and the author of many books, including Music of the Spheres (Four Brothers Publishing), The Spiritual Lives of the Great Composers (Zondervan), Worship – A Way of Life (Baker Books), Raising Musical Kids (Vine Books), Music of the Great Composers (Zondervan), and Spiritual Moments with the Great Composers (Zondervan), The Music of Angels; A Listener's Guide to Sacred Music, from Chant to Christian Rock (Loyola Press), and Devotions from the World of Music (Cook).

From 1984 until his death, he served as the executive director of the Christian Performing Artists' Fellowship. He was also the artistic director of the Masterworks festival, and the conductor of the Symphony of the Lakes.

Patrick Kavanaugh's musical education included a Doctor of Musical Arts and a Master of Music (both from the University of Maryland), and a Bachelor of Music from the Catholic University of America School of Music. He also did extensive Post-Doctoral work in musicology, music theory, and conducting. His teachers included Earle Brown, Conrad Bernier, Mark Wilson, and Lloyd Geisler. As a composer, he currently has eighteen compositions published by Carl Fischer Music, and licensed by Broadcast Music Incorporated. Kavanaugh has composed in a wide variety of genre, from orchestral to chamber music, from opera to electronic music.

He resided near Winona Lake, Indiana, with his wife, Barbara – a cellist. He died from a heart attack on April 2, 2018.
