= Soulful Symphony =

Orchestra based in Baltimore, Maryland, US

Soulful Symphony is a 75-piece American symphony orchestra founded in 2000 by composer Darin Atwater, who serves as the symphony's artistic director and conductor. The symphony is based in Baltimore, Maryland and its membership is predominantly African American and Latino. The Soulful Symphony performs classical, jazz, gospel, and popular music.
