= Kerem Hasan =

British-Cypriot conductor

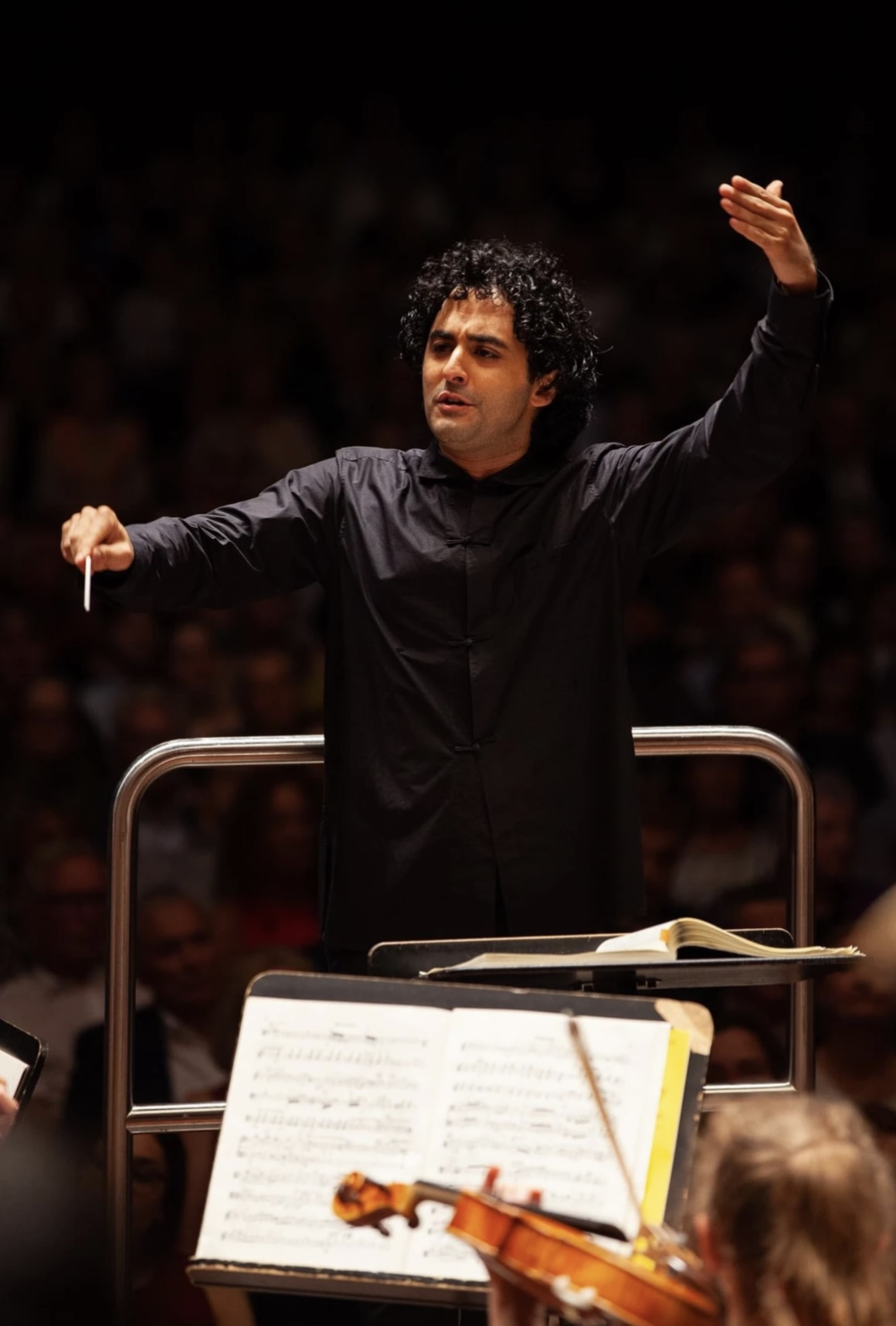
- Kerem Hasan
- Born: 10 January 1992 (age 34); London, United Kingdom
- Education: Royal Conservatoire of Scotland
- Occupation: Conductor
- Organizations: Tiroler Landestheater Innsbruck; Tiroler Symphony Orchestra - Chief Conductor 2019-2023; Welsh National Opera - 2017-2019; Noord Nederlands Orkest - Principal Guest Conductor

Kerem Hasan (born 10 January 1992) is a British and Cypriot conductor. Winner of the 2017 Nestlé and Salzburg Festival Young Conductors Award. From 2019 to 2023, Hasan served as the Chief Conductor of the Tiroler Symphonieorchester Innsbruck in Austria. Prior to that, he was appointed the Associate Conductor of the Welsh National Opera in 2017 to 2019 at the age of 25.

Since 2025, Hasan has been the Principal Guest Conductor of the Noord Nederlands Orkest.

He has conducted many of the world's leading orchestras such as Royal Concertgebouw Orchestra, London Symphony Orchestra, London Philharmonic Orchestra, BBC Philharmonic Orchestra, BBC Symphony Orchestra, Royal Philharmonic Orchestra, SWR Symphonieorchester, MDR Sinfonieorchester, Danish National Symphony Orchestra, Dresden Philharmonic.

== Early life and education ==
Hasan was born in London, United Kingdom to British-Cypriot parents. He started learning the piano from the age of 5 with his first piano teacher Marion Blech. He then attended Junior Academy at the Royal Academy of Music from the age of 12 and Purcell School. Hasan studied piano and conducting at the Royal Conservatoire of Scotland graduating in 2014, the Hochschule für Musik Franz Liszt in Weimar, and later the Zurich University of the Arts where he studied with Johannes Schlaefli.

== Career ==
In August 2017, Hasan won the Nestlé and Salzburg Festival Young Conductors Award. In 2016, he was a finalist at the Donatella Flick Conducting Competition in London, and was appointed Associate Conductor of the Welsh National Opera later that year.

In 2018 at age 26, it was announced that Hasan would be appointed Chief Conductor of the Tiroler Symphonieorchester Innsbruck in Austria, just months after he substituted for Bernard Haitink, conducting Mahler’s Ninth Symphony with the Royal Concertgebouw Orchestra in Amsterdam. Hasan remained the Chief Conductor of the Tiroler Symphonieorchester for 4 seasons. During his tenure, his opera performances at the Tiroler Landesthestheater Innsbruck include La Traviata, Samson et Delilah, Rigoletto, and The Rape of Lucretia.

For Glyndebourne Festival Opera in 2019, Hasan conducted their new production of Mozart's Die Zauberflöte from the design and direction team of Barbe & Doucet, and in 2021 for Glyndebourne on Tour (The Rake's Progress).

In the summer of 2022, he made his US debut with the Detroit Symphony Orchestra, Utah Symphony and Minnesota Orchestra.

Hasan made his English National Opera debut in 2022 conducting Mozart's Così fan tutte directed by Phelim McDermott, and returned in 2023, Calixto Bieito’s production of Bizet's Carmen. In 2025, he returned to premiere Jake's Heggie's opera Dead Man Walking to critical acclaim, marking the first full professional UK staging of the work.

In August 2025, the Noord Nederlands Orkest announced the appointment of Hasan as their next Principal Guest Conductor.
