= Low Brass Concerto =

The Low Brass Concerto is a concerto by American composer Jennifer Higdon for four solos, low brass instruments, and orchestra. The work was commissioned by the Chicago Symphony Orchestra for its renowned low brass section and co-commissioned by the Baltimore Symphony Orchestra and the Philadelphia Orchestra. It was composed in 2017 and was first performed by the Chicago Symphony Orchestra under the direction of Riccardo Muti on February 1, 2018.

== Composition ==
The Low Brass Concerto is cast in one continuous movement in alternating slow and fast sections. It has a performance duration of approximately 17 minutes.

=== Instrumentation ===
The low brass soloists consist of two tenor trombones, a bass trombone, and a tuba. They are accompanied by a large orchestra consisting of two flutes, two oboes, clarinet, bass clarinet, bassoon, contrabassoon, four horns, three trumpets, timpani, percussion, and strings.

== Reception ==
Reviewing the world premiere, John von Rhein of the Chicago Tribune wrote, "The new work harnesses the signature strength of [the CSO's low brass section] in imaginative ways that allow them to function as a unit, duo, trio and individual voices, before her 17-minute, single-movement concerto charges to a rousing close." He added, "This is a big-shouldered Chicago brass blowout if there ever was one — beautiful, accessible, inventive, impeccably crafted — drawing not so much on its muscular might as on its ability, less often recognized, to play softly and lyrically." Hedy Weiss of the Chicago Sun-Times similarly described the concerto as a "wonderfully accessible, richly melodic new work — one propelled by exhilarating rhythms, vibrant orchestral color, and an ingenious use of strings, woodwinds and percussion."

Despite lauding the concerto, Lawrence A. Johnson of the Chicago Classical Review was more critical of the piece, noting, "It's probably a good thing that the concerto feels too short rather than too long. If there is a complaint, one wishes there were more standout solo opportunities for each of the four players." He added, "Granted, in a work this short, there's not a lot of space for four players to chart their varied paths. (The premiere performance ran 20 minutes, slightly longer than the 15 to 17 minutes indicated in the score.) Perhaps some revision and judicious expansion to Higdon's likable concerto might allow each of the four soloists to stand out more and differentiate their instruments more than is currently the case." This criticism was shared by David Patrick Stearns of The Philadelphia Inquirer, who remarked, "So the concerto isn't exactly written for four players, but for four players acting more or less as a single entity. Mostly. Individual instruments occasionally pop out in solos or duets. Thus, the foursome has many lyrical and dramatic possibilities of any concerto soloist, though not the agility that one associates with, say, a violinist who leaps into the ozone during the cadenza."

== See also ==
- List of compositions by Jennifer Higdon
