= Tuba Concerto (Higdon) =

Concerto by Jennifer Higdon

The Tuba Concerto is a composition for solo tuba and orchestra by the American composer Jennifer Higdon. The work was commissioned by the Pittsburgh Symphony Orchestra for their principal tubist Craig Knox. It was first performed by Knox and the Pittsburgh Symphony Orchestra under the conductor Robert Spano on March 16, 2018.

== Composition ==
The concerto has a duration of approximately 19 minutes and is cast in three movements:

1. Dynamo
2. Crescent Line
3. Adamant Scherzo

It is scored for a solo tuba and an orchestra consisting of two flutes, oboe, English horn, two clarinets, bassoon, contrabassoon, four horns, three trumpets, three trombones, timpani, percussion, and strings.

== Reception ==
Reviewing the world premiere, Jeremy Reynolds of the Pittsburgh Post-Gazette wrote, "Ms. Higdon's concerto was engaging throughout, with angular, dynamic melodies and short bursts of virtuosity in the tuba (really) throughout." He continued:

The outer movements were quick, with zipping scales and rapid-fire articulation. The phrases were fairly short and traded between soloist and orchestra at a brisk clip, likely due to the physical requirements of the tuba (Mr. Knox needed to come up for air fairly regularly). This made for a different sound than the long, spinning melodies of a string or woodwind concerto, but it was fresh, invigorating even.
