= Cheryl Frances-Hoad =

British composer

Cheryl Ann Frances-Hoad (born 1980) is a British composer.

== Early life ==
Frances-Hoad began composing at the age of eight while studying cello and piano at the Yehudi Menuhin School. She graduated from Gonville and Caius College (Cambridge University) with a Double 1st in 2001 and an MPhil (with Distinction) in Composition, also at Cambridge.

== Composer ==
She has had two ballets choreographed by Lynn Seymour and Geoffrey Cauley; the second was performed by Scottish Ballet in the Britten Theatre, London. Her commissions include works for the BBC, the Surrey Philharmonic, the Manchester International Cello Festival, the Chard Festival of Women in Music, the Bass Club, Bass Fest and the Almeida Festival.

In 2000 the Cambridge Music Festival commissioned a work to commemorate the 250th anniversary of Bach's death, which was performed by the Cambridge University Chamber Orchestra and conducted by Nicholas Daniel. In November 2001 Frances-Hoad had her first chamber opera, broken lines: sonata for opera, premiered by the New Cambridge Opera Group, as part of the Britten@25 Festival, with generous funding from the R.V.W. Trust.

June 2002 saw two premieres: the Spitalfields Festival commission (a work for Nicholas Daniel and the Schubert Ensemble, with funding from the Foyle Foundation), and a piano trio for the London Mozart Trio at the Wigmore Hall. October 2002 saw another premiere at the Wigmore Hall, with a solo cello work for Thomas Carroll and Y.C.A.T, and a commission from the Zurich Chamber Orchestra.

Frances-Hoad was one of six featured composers in Tête à Tête's opera project Family Matters (based on Beaumarchais' third Figaro play The Guilty Mother) with a libretto by Olivier-Award winner Amanda Holden. Workshops took place in Battersea Arts Centre in September 2003, and the final opera was staged throughout February 2004 at the Bridewell Theatre, followed by twelve performances around the country. (The RVW Trust also assisted this venture.) In June 2005, The Glory Tree, a song cycle for the Kreisler Ensemble (inspired by Shamanic rituals and sung entirely in Old English), was premiered in the South Bank's Fresh Series in the Purcell Room.

Her 2012 opera Amy's Last Dive was composed when she was resident DARE Fellow in Opera Related Arts at Opera North and Leeds University. Quark Dances was toured in the UK by Rambert Dance Company in 2014. Two works received their premieres at the BBC Proms in 2017: Ein Feste Burg by organist William Whitehead, and From the Beginning of the World by vocal ensemble the Cardinall's Musick. Last Man Standing a 30-minute work for baritone and orchestra with libretto by Tamsin Collison, was premiered in 2018 by Marcus Farnsworth and the BBC Symphony Orchestra, conducted by Martyn Brabbins.

Scenes from the Wild, a 70-minute song cycle for tenor and chamber orchestra, was performed by the City of London Sinfonia and the BBC Singers in 2022. Also that year Your servant, Elizabeth, a short piece for chorus and orchestra, received its premiere at the BBC Proms on 22 July. In May 2023 Laura van der Heijden premiered her Cello Concerto in Glasgow with the BBC Scottish Symphony Orchestra conducted by Ryan Wigglesworth.

In 2023 Frances-Hoad was commissioned by King's College, Cambridge, to compose a new carol for that year's Festival of Nine Lessons and Carols, held at the college's chapel on Christmas Eve. The piece, titled The Cradle, is a setting of an anonymous 17th century Austrian text, translated by Robert Graves.

== Prizes and scholarships ==
Frances-Hoad has won several prizes, including the Purcell Composition Prize, the Bach Choir Carol Competition, the BBC Young Composers Workshop 1996, the Cambridge Composer's Competition, the Birmingham Conservatoire Composition Competition and the Robert Helps Prize.

She received the Mendelssohn Scholarship in 2002, the Bliss Prize in 2002, and was joint winner of the Harriet Cohen Award in 2002. She has also received awards from Cambridge University, the Newby Trust, the Earls Colne Educational trust and the Sidney Perry Foundation.

In February 2006, after winning the $10,000 Robert Helps Prize with My fleeting Angel (for piano trio), Frances-Hoad became Composer-in-Residence at the University of South Florida for a week, where she gave a two-hour lecture about her work, and a masterclass for both undergraduate and postgraduate composition students.

After winning the Cheltenham Festival Commission in the Royal Philharmonic Society Composition Prize, Frances-Hoad's My Day in Hell was premiered by the Dante Quartet at the Cheltenham Festival.

== Albums ==
- The Glory Tree: Chamber Works, Champs Hill Records (2011). Eight pieces (1999–2008): 'Memoria', 'My Fleeting Angel', 'The Snowwoman', 'The Ogre Lover', 'Invocation', 'Bouleumata', 'Melancholia', 'The Glory Tree'.
- You Promised Me Everything, Champs Hill Records (2014). Vocal works: 'One Life Stand', 'There is no Rose', 'Don't', 'Psalm No. 1', 'You Promised Me Everything', 'Last Night', 'Nunc Dimittis', 'Beowulf'.
- Stolen Rhythm, Champs Hill Records (2017). Orchestral and chamber works: 'Katharsis' for cello and piano, 'The Forgiveness Machine'for piano trio, 'Quark Dances' for large ensemble, 'Homages' (Book 1 & Book 2, for piano), 'A Refusal to Mourn' for oboe and string orchestra.
- Even You Song, First Hand Records (2017). An Evenson-inspired work for choir and organ.
- Magic Lantern Tales, Champs Hill Records (2018), songs
- The Whole Earth Dances, Champs Hill Records (2020). Nine chamber works (1998–2018): 'The Whole Earth Dances', 'Cloud Movements', 'Songs and Dances', 'The Prophecy', 'Game On', 'Pay Close Attention', 'Mazurka', 'Medea', 'My Day in Hell'.
