= Conrad Tao =

American composer and pianist

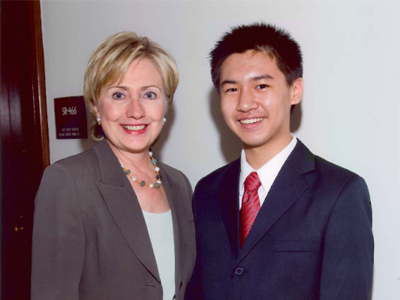
Hillary Clinton with Tao, in 2008, to recognize his being named a Davidson Fellow Laureate

Conrad Yiwen Tao (born June 11, 1994) is an American composer and pianist and former violinist. Tao's piano and violin performances since childhood brought him early recognition at music festivals and competitions. At age 13, he was featured on the PBS TV series From the Top – Live from Carnegie Hall as violinist, pianist and composer. He won eight consecutive ASCAP Morton Gould Young Composer Awards. Among his compositions have been commissions by the New York Philharmonic, Hong Kong Philharmonic, Pacific Symphony and Dallas Symphony Orchestra.

Among other honors, Tao is a U.S. Presidential Scholar in the Arts, a Davidson Fellow Laureate and a Gilmore Foundation Young Artist. He was the only classical artist named by Forbes magazine in 2011 as one of the "30 Under 30" in the music industry. In 2012, Tao released a solo piano EP, The Juilliard Sessions: Conrad Tao Plays Debussy and Stravinsky, and a synthpop album, Eyelids. Several more albums have followed. Also in 2012, he was an Avery Fisher Career Grant awardee. He produced and hosted a three-night music festival, the UNPLAY Festival, in New York City in 2013. He was artist-in-residence for Dallas Symphony Orchestra in 2015/16 and Hong Kong Philharmonic in 2017.

== Early life and career ==
Tao was born in Urbana, Illinois to Sam Tao, an engineer, and Mingfang Ting, a research scientist. Both parents were born in China and earned doctorates from Princeton University. Hearing his older sister Connie's piano lessons, Tao began to play children's songs on the piano, by ear, at the age of 18 months. He gave his first piano recital at age 4. At age 8, he made his concerto debut with the Utah Chamber Music Festival Orchestra, performing Mozart's Piano Concerto in A major. At the age of 9, Tao moved with his family to New York City, and he began studying in the Juilliard School's Pre-College Division and at the Professional Children's School. He won the 2003 Walgreens National Concerto Competition as a violinist. In 2004, 2007 (live at Carnegie Hall) and 2011, Tao was featured on the PBS and NPR series From the Top as violinist, pianist and composer.

Tao won eight consecutive ASCAP Morton Gould Young Composer Awards from 2004 to 2011. At age 10, his piano composition Silhouettes and Shadows won the BMI Carlos Surinach Prize. His first piano concerto, The Four Elements, was premiered in 2007 by the ProMusica Chamber Orchestra of Columbus, Ohio. In 2008, Tao was named a Davidson Fellow Laureate for his project, "Bridging Classical Music from the Past to the Future as Pianist and Composer". In reviewing a 2008 piano recital in Berkeley, where Tao gave the U.S. premiere of his "Fantasy-Sonata", the San Francisco Chronicle wrote: "The four movements of the piece tumble forth in a way that supports its hybrid title, suggesting both a free flow of ideas and an overarching structural framework. There are melodies for the ear to grab onto – especially in the slow movement, set against rippling left-hand accompaniment – and Tao varies and subverts them with glee; the intermezzo, with its spidery octave figures, is a little gem of sardonic wit." Other early compositions include pieces for solo piano and chamber music such as Tao's 2009 piano trio.

He won both the Juilliard Pre-College Gina Bachauer Piano Competition and the Prokofiev Concerto Competition in 2006. At the 2007 Festival del Sole, the 13-year-old Tao substituted for the ailing Italian pianist Fabio Bidini to play Serge Prokofiev's Piano Concerto No. 3 with the Russian National Orchestra. One critic wrote, "nothing could prepare us for the talent that leapt from the stage. [Tao's] command of one of the classical repertoire's most difficult works was simply amazing." By the age of 16, Tao had appeared as a piano soloist with the Philadelphia Orchestra, Russian National Orchestra, Baltimore Symphony, Dallas Symphony, Detroit Symphony, Utah Symphony and San Francisco Symphony, among many others.

In 2008, Tao performed both Mendelssohn's Violin Concerto in E minor and Piano Concerto No. 1 in the same concert with the Miami Piano Festival Orchestra. He repeated that feat nine times the next year with the Symphony of the Americas in Boca Raton. The same year, critic Harris Goldsmith, in Musical America, called Tao "the most exciting prodigy ever to come my way. His promise is limitless." The Wall Street Journal wrote of a 2008 concert: "In Mozart's dark-hued Concerto No. 20 in D Minor, Mr. Tao showed appealing freshness in his use of telling, expressive details that distinguish one interpretation from the next – a slight decrescendo here, a change of tonal color there, a heartfelt response to the piece. The crossed-hand passages and rapid scale runs were performed with consummate ease." In 2009, Tao's venues included the Ravinia Festival and Moscow's Bolshoi Theatre. Of a 2009 performance of Ravel's Piano Concerto in G Major, the San Francisco Classical Voice commented: "The first movement was full of thrills: laser-sharp articulation and accuracy, powerful glissandos ... and, what's more, heartfelt expression. ... Expressiveness came even more to the fore in the second movement. Never have I heard a left hand with such hypnotic affect, with right-hand legato melodies as smooth as a trip down the Seine."

Tao studied piano with Yoheved Kaplinsky and Choong Mo Kang at Juilliard and composition with Christopher Theofanidis of Yale University. He studied violin with Catherine Cho at Juilliard's Pre-College Division. He also studied for six summers at the Aspen Music Festival and School from 2004 to 2009, mostly playing violin, which he believes has helped him to develop "an understanding of the dynamic between orchestra and soloist."

== 2010 to 2011 ==
Tao was composer-in-residence for the 2009–10 season with Chicago's Music in the Loft concert series. As part of this program, the Brooklyn Friends of Chamber Music commissioned his "String Quartet No. 2" for the Jasper Quartet, which they performed throughout the U.S. After hearing Tao play the premiere of his Three Songs for Piano (2010), the reviewer of The Washington Post called them "well-constructed miniatures exploiting different moods and textures on the piano. The juxtaposition was admirable; Tao made no bones about concealing his influences, with Debussy first and foremost. ... But influences aside, his compositional voice is not "derivative" at all; you can discern a clear, fresh imagination". Among Tao's 2010 performances was a concert with Utah Symphony that included Rachmaninoff's Rhapsody on a Theme of Paganini. In the summer of 2010, Tao returned to the Aspen Music Festival as a guest artist to fill in on short notice as a piano soloist for an ailing Jeffrey Kahane.

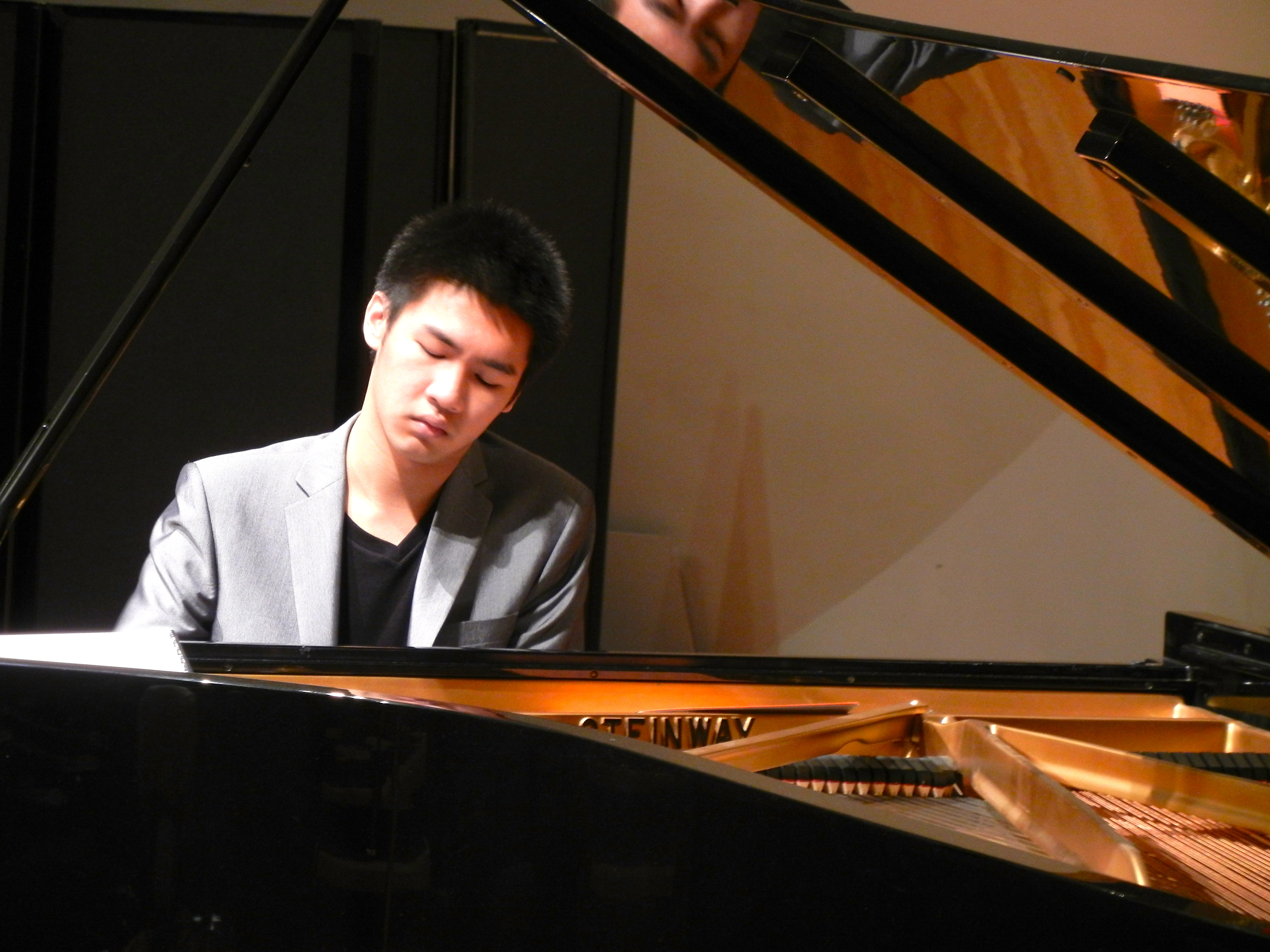
Tao in 2011

Tao completed high school in 2011 by independent study through the Indiana University High School of Continuing Studies, while studying music in the Juilliard precollege program and performing concerts on tour. Of this schedule, he said: "It isn't always easy to be an active performer as well as a student. ... I love doing all of these things at once and giving myself as many challenges as I can, because I learn so much from the experiences that result. Everything I teach myself or see or do can be applied to a larger framework". Later the same year, Tao began college in the Columbia University–Juilliard School joint bachelor's degree program.

The New York Times praised Tao's performance of Chopin piano pieces while accompanying American Ballet Theatre dancers at a 2011 gala at New York City Center. Tao repeated Rachmaninoff's Rhapsody in 2011 with the Pacific Symphony. and was featured as both a piano and violin soloist in Jackie Evancho's 2011 album and PBS Great Performances special Dream with Me. After this, he retired from playing the violin professionally. In his 2011 Cliburn Concerts debut in Dallas, Texas, Tao was again a last-minute replacement, where he "continually uncovered the energy and emotional underpinnings inherent in [the] music".

Tao was the only classical artist named by Forbes magazine as one of the "30 Under 30" in the music industry in 2011. He won the 2011 Soloist-Prize at the Festspiele Mecklenburg-Vorpommern, he was named a 2011 U.S. Presidential Scholar in the Arts, and the National Foundation for Advancement in the Arts YoungArts program awarded him its gold medal in music. He was named a 2012 Gilmore Foundation Young Artist.

== 2012 to 2013 ==
Tao travelled to Europe, South America and throughout North America to play more than 75 concerts in 2012. His concerts included Tchaikovsky's Piano Concerto No. 1 with the Utah Symphony, Saint-Saëns' Piano Concerto No. 2 with the Detroit Symphony Orchestra and Rachmaninoff's Piano Concerto No. 2 with the Symphony of the Americas in Fort Lauderdale, Florida, showing "a natural feel for the concerto's yearning melodies and restless energy". He gave his second annual recital in New York City called "A Piece for Peace" at Weill Recital Hall that included the Prokofiev Piano Sonata No. 7. Tao also played a program with Orquestra Filarmônica de Minas Gerais in Brazil and performed three recitals at the Irving S. Gilmore International Keyboard Festival in Michigan, where he gave "a stupendous performance. ... The first half was elegant. Fireworks followed." This was followed by performances in Munich, Paris, Berlin and London.

Tao was one of two Avery Fisher Career Grant awardees for 2012. Also in 2012, Tao played concerts in Mexico and at the Montreal Chamber Fest, where his Dvořák pieces "stole the show with a once-in-a-lifetime performance of the rarely-encountered American Suite ... he plays music as if the composer were at his side, with color, joy and spontaneous poetry." At the 2012 Aspen Music Festival, Tao played Gershwin's Second Rhapsody, followed by recitals in Avery Fisher Hall at the Mostly Mozart Festival.

The same year, he performed with the Oklahoma City Philharmonic, and his composition "Pángǔ", an overture-like modern piece inspired by the Chinese creation myth, was premiered by the Hong Kong Philharmonic, under Jaap van Zweden. In Toronto, Tao played Beethoven's Third Piano Concerto and Liszt's "Hungarian Rhapsody No. 6", and with the Allentown Symphony Orchestra, he played Rachmaninoff's Piano Concerto No. 3 He returned to Pacific Symphony to play the Grieg piano concerto with "crisply inflected and strongly sculpted fortissimos and effervescent scherzando playing." He also played with the Amsterdam Chamber Orchestra at the Concertgebouw.

In 2013, Tao played Prokofiev's Piano Concerto No. 1 with the Jacksonville Symphony and, on less than three days' notice to replace another pianist, he joined St. Louis Symphony to play Prokofiev's Piano Concerto No. 3. He next played Mozart's Piano Concerto No. 21 and the "Hungarian Rhapsody No. 6" with the Hong Kong Philharmonic. That year, Face the Music's Pannonia Quartet played Tao's String Quartet No. 2, while Tao performed a recital at the Aspen Music Festival and then was in Switzerland playing Prokofiev's Piano Concerto No. 3 with the Bern Symphony Orchestra. In Florida he played all five of Beethoven's piano concerti with the Symphony of the Americas and also played the five with the Spokane Symphony. On short notice, he rejoined Utah Symphony, filling in for an ailing soloist in Tchaikovsky's Piano Concerto No. 1. A New York Times review of Tao's concert previewing pieces from his 2013 album Voyages admired Tao's "confident and sensitive playing [and] the scope of his probing intellect and openhearted vision."

In between chamber music and concerto performances that year, using his cash grants, Tao produced and hosted a three-night music festival, the UNPLAY Festival, in New York City in June 2013, which explored the place of classical music in modern culture. His goal was to challenge the role of music as passive entertainment and the "narrow conception of what classical music is for, among not only audiences, but also musicians and presenters". Tao guest-hosted WQXR's Hammered! with a series of episodes in which he played works by modern composers that evoke memory and remembrance. He then returned to the Festspiele Mecklenburg-Vorpommern to play chamber music.

Other performances in 2013 included stops in Sweden and Chile. He played a recital and concertos by Shostakovich and Mozart with the Santa Fe Pro Musica and opened Pacific Symphony's 35th season with "crisp, clear-eyed and thoroughly musical" performances of Rachmaninoff's Piano Concerto No. 3. With Detroit Symphony Orchestra, his Beethoven Piano Concerto No. 1 was described as "crisp and accurate, lively and dynamic, and very musical, with moments of thoughtful reflection". In Brazil, he performed the Britten's Piano Concerto with Orquestra Filarmônica de Minas Gerais, conducted by Fabio Mechetti. He returned to Weill Recital Hall in October for his third annual "A Piece for Peace" concert, playing works by Getty, Monk and Ravel. Tao again substituted on short notice with the Stamford Symphony Orchestra. Later in the year Tao premiered an orchestral work that he wrote for Dallas Symphony Orchestra to commemorate the 50th anniversary of JFK's assassination, The World Is Very Different Now (a line from JFK's 1961 inaugural address). A review on DFW.com called it "atmospheric, creating shifting moods. ... There are haunting passages that are strikingly appealing, though there are few, if any, sustained, well-defined melodic lines. Instead the work draws listeners by creating moods and with remarkable orchestral color." With the National Arts Centre Orchestra in Ottawa, Canada, Tao performed Mozart's Piano Concerto No. 19.

== 2014 to 2015 ==
In 2014, Tao rejoined the Oklahoma City Philharmonic to play Prokofiev's Piano Concerto No. 3, "illuminating the composer's acerbic wit, sly insouciance and unrelenting rhythmic drive." He repeated the concerto with the Utah Symphony. With the Nashville Symphony, he played Ravel's Piano Concerto in G, and with the Colorado Springs Philharmonic, he played Rachmaninoff's Rhapsody and Liszt's "Totentanz". He performed Rachmaninoff's Piano Concerto No. 3 with the Reno Philharmonic Orchestra and played Totentanz and Rhapsody No. 6 with the Calgary Philharmonic Orchestra. With the Swedish Radio Symphony Orchestra in Stockholm, he performed Gershwin's Concerto in F, followed by recitals and private concerts in Amsterdam, Shanghai China, and the United States, as well Saint-Saëns' Piano Concerto No. 2 in Pennsylvania. Tao again played the Saint-Saëns with the St. Louis Symphony, followed by concerts in Mexico, the Grieg piano concerto with Hawaii Symphony Orchestra and Liszt's Piano Concerto No. 1 with Dallas Symphony Orchestra (DSO).

Later in the year, he played Rachmaninoff's Piano Concerto No. 2 in North Carolina and gave recitals, including at the Aspen Music Festival and in Switzerland, before playing Rachmaninoff's Piano Concerto No. 3 with the Bern Symphony Orchestra. He recorded a video for The New York Times playing the final movement of Prokofiev's Piano Sonata No. 7. He opened the Winston-Salem Symphony's season with Rachmaninoff's Rhapsody and played Ravel's Concerto for the Left Hand with the Battle Creek Symphony Orchestra. In October, the Edmonton Symphony Orchestra played Tao's "Pángǔ", and he joined them to play Grieg's Piano Concerto. In Amsterdam, he made his debut with the Royal Concertgebouw Orchestra, performing Liszt's Piano Concerto No. 1. He played Rachmaninoff's Piano Concerto No. 2 in Norway with the Stavanger Symphony Orchestra and then reprised the Grieg with the Toronto Symphony Orchestra and Maine's Portland Symphony Orchestra.

Tao rejoined Baltimore Symphony to play Shostakovich's Piano Concerto No. 1 at several venues. He opened the New York Youth Symphony season at Carnegie Hall with Rachmaninoff's Rhapsody. Tao's composition "Public Service Announcement (dogs and cats)" was premiered at Merkin Hall in New York City in November by the New York Virtuoso Singers. He reprised the Rhapsody in Malaysia and also with the Swedish Radio Symphony Orchestra in Stockholm. NPR selected Tao's performance of Bach's Toccata in F-sharp minor as one of public radio's best in-studio performances of 2014. Tao played Beethoven's Emperor Concerto among other pieces with the Boulder Philharmonic Orchestra, which also played his piece, "Pángǔ". He played Mozart's Piano Concerto No. 21 with the Orlando Philharmonic Orchestra and, at short notice with the Utah Symphony, played Beethoven's Piano Concerto No. 5. He joined the Knoxville Symphony Orchestra to play Mozart's Piano Concerto No. 25, with "exuberant enchantment" and "seemingly innate storytelling ability".

Tao was the 2015/16 DSO Artist-in-residence, with whom he performed Rachmaninoff's Rhapsody, Aaron Copland's piano sonata, four of Rachmaninoff's Études-Tableaux, Op. 39, the violin-and-piano version of Rachmaninoff's Vocalise, Bartók's "Contrasts", Prokofiev's "Piano Sonata No. 7" and Miklós Rózsa's Spellbound Concerto, among other pieces. He also composed for the orchestra, curated concert programs, participated in radio broadcasts and gave recitals and master classes. Also in 2015, Tao played Gershwin's Rhapsody in Blue with the Hawaii Youth Symphony and gave several performances with San Diego Symphony, playing Shostakovich's Piano Concerto No. 1, among other pieces. With Alabama Symphony Orchestra, he played Prokofiev's Piano Concerto No. 3. He played Beethoven's Emperor Concerto and other works at the Music in the Mountains festival in California, Rachmaninoff's Rhapsody with San Francisco Symphony, and Gershwin's Rhapsody in Blue with Sun Valley Summer Symphony. He returned to the Aspen Music Festival to play several programs that included Schumann's "Carnaval", Poulenc's sextet for piano and wind, and Beethoven's Fantasia in C minor.

Later in 2015, Tao premiered his concerto An Adjustment for piano, chamber orchestra, and iGadgets, at the Kimmel Center for the Performing Arts in Philadelphia, where he was also the soloist in Saint-Saëns' Piano Concerto No. 2. Inspired by Tao's experiences with depression, An Adjustment combines "in the most imaginative way the current style of spiritual post-Romanticism and '90s techno club music." His "Pángǔ" was performed by the Pittsburgh Symphony Orchestra, and Tao joined the orchestra to give a "not only thrillingly rhythmical, but extraordinarily sensitive" account of Gershwin's Concerto in F. Tao made stops in Europe, Brazil and the U.S. to play concerts including a recital based on his album, Pictures. He rejoined Pacific Symphony with Prokofiev's Piano Concerto No. 3.

== 2016 to 2017 ==
In 2016, Tao played Schumann's Piano Concerto with the Tallahassee Symphony in Florida, and Prokofiev's Piano Concerto No. 3 with the Colorado Springs Philharmonic and Mozart's Concerto No. 7, among other pieces, with the San Diego Philharmonic. With Cincinnati Symphony, he played Rachmaninoff's Rhapsody. With West Michigan Symphony, he played Tchaikovsky's Piano Concerto No. 1 and next performed the Grieg Piano Concerto in Calgary, Karol Szymanowski's Symphony No. 4, Symphonie Concertante, with the Malaysian Philharmonic Orchestra, Tchaikovsky's No. 1 with the Mobile Symphony Orchestra, and Beethoven's Piano Concerto No. 5 with Santa Fe Pro Musica.

With the Swedish Radio Symphony, he played Rachmaninoff's Piano Concerto No. 4, and he played Beethoven's Piano Concerto No. 5 with the Berkeley Symphony. Tao returned to the DSO to finish his year as artist-in-residence with a recital and the premiere of his orchestral composition, Alice, which was inspired by his recurring childhood nightmares, sometimes described as Alice in Wonderland syndrome. He accompanied the premiere of David Lang's opera The Loser on stage at the Brooklyn Academy of Music. Tao played Tchaikovsky's Piano Concerto No. 1 with the Giuseppe Verdi Symphonic Orchestra in Milan, Italy, and his composition, I got a wiggle that I just can’t shake was premiered by the Pacific Symphony. He played Rachmaninoff's Piano Concerto No. 3 with Virginia Symphony Orchestra, Rachmaninoff's Rhapsody with the Hawaii Symphony, Grieg's Piano Concerto with the Nashville Symphony, both Schumann's Piano Concerto and Beethoven's Piano Concerto No. 5 at the National Arts Centre in Canada, Szymanowski's Symphony No. 4 with the Szczecin Philharmonic in Poland and Bernstein's Symphony No. 2, The Age of Anxiety, with Staatskapelle Halle in Germany. He also played Rachmaninoff's Piano Concerto No. 2 with the Orquesta Sinfónica Nacional de México, Schumann's Piano Concerto with the Peninsula Symphony, Gershwin's Concerto in F with the Accademia Nazionale di Santa Cecilia in Italy and Gershwin's Rhapsody in Blue with the Asheville Symphony Orchestra.

In 2017 he gave a recital for the Van Cliburn Foundation in Dallas and a concert with the Royal Conservatory of Music in Toronto, playing Charles Ives' Piano Trio, and the Dvořák Piano Trio No. 3 in F Minor. With Portland Ovations in Maine, he played the same two trios, plus the Haydn Piano Trio No. 39 in G Major. Among other concerts, he played with the Orquesta Filarmónica de Jalisco of Guadalajara, Mexico and gave recitals at the Aspen Music Festival. With the Tucson Symphony Orchestra in Arizona, he performed Gershwin's "I Got Rhythm" Variations, Rhapsody in Blue and Copland's Suite from "Billy the Kid". He premiered his own "free-form" piano concerto, The Oneiroi in New York with the Atlantic Classical Orchestra in Palm Beach Gardens, Florida.

Tao was the Hong Kong Philharmonic's 2017 artist-in-residence, with whom he premiered his swallow harbor. He played the Grieg piano concert with Stamford Symphony in Connecticut and his own concerto, An Adjustment, with Sioux City Symphony Orchestra. With Lexington Philharmonic Orchestra, he played his piece, "Pángǔ", and Gershwin's Concerto in F. Winston-Salem's symphony orchestra performed his The world is very different now, and he joined them to perform Prokofiev's Piano Concerto No. 3. Tao played Mozart's Piano Concerto No. 8 at the Mainly Mozart Festival in San Diego, California, and Khachaturian's piano concerto with the Grant Park Orchestra in Chicago before returning to the Aspen Music Festival.

With Philadelphia Orchestra he played Rachmaninoff's Piano Concert No. 2 and with the Columbus ProMusica Chamber Orchestra, he premiered his own work for piano and orchestra, Over, and played Haydn's Keyboard Concerto 11. With Eugene Symphony he played Ravel's Piano Concerto for the Left Hand and Liszt's Totentanz, and with Spokane Symphony, he returned to Saint-Saëns' Piano Concerto No. 2. He then played Schumann's Piano Concerto with Mississippi Symphony Orchestra. Later in 2017 he made his Lincoln Center recital debut, where he received an Emerging Artist Award, and returned to Berkeley to play Rachmaninoff's Rhapsody and Liszt's "Totentanz" He wrote an encore, "All I Had Forgotten, Or Tried To", inspired by Kevin Killian's collection of erotic fiction, Impossible Princess.

== Since 2018 ==
In early 2018, in addition to recitals, Tao's schedule included Bernstein's The Age of Anxiety with the Malaysian Philharmonic Orchestra, Prokofiev's Second Piano Concerto with Seattle, Schumann's Piano Concerto with the Santa Fe Pro Musica and Gershwin's Concerto in F with the Buffalo Philharmonic Orchestra, with which he toured Poland in March 2018. He also formed the JCT Trio with violinist Stefan Jackiw and cellist Jay Campbell. In contrast to Tao's solo recitals, which focus on unconventional programming, the JCT Trio programs traditional repertoire.

In April, he joined Atlanta Symphony Orchestra to perform Shostakovich's Piano Concerto No. 1 and Hamilton Philharmonic Orchestra for Bartók's Piano Concert No. 3. The same month, Tao's violin sonata, Threads of Contact, premiered by Paul Huang and commissioned by Washington Performing Arts, for whom Tao has been a recitalist, was performed at the Kennedy Center. In May, Tao's dance composition, More Forever, was premiered by Caleb Teicher and Company in New York City, beginning an ongoing collaboration with Teicher. Tao was nominated for a 2019 Bessie Award for Musical Composition of More Forever. Tao returned to Aspen in June. In September, the New York Philharmonic premiered Tao's Everything Must Go, the fifth Tao work premiered by conductor Jaap van Zweden; the piece was commissioned as a prelude to Bruckner's Symphony No. 8 and takes inspiration from that piece. In October he again performed with the Swedish Radio Symphony Orchestra. In November, Tao performed Tchaikovsky's Piano Concerto No. 1 with San Diego Symphony.

In January 2019, Tao repeated Teicher's More Forever at the Guggenheim Museum in New York (and then on tour) and also continued to collaborate with Jackiw in Vancouver, Canada, at the 92nd Street Y in New York, and on tour. The next month, he reprised his performance in Lang's The Loser, this time with the Los Angeles Opera, In March he performed Chopin's Piano Concerto No. 1 with the Pacific Symphony. In May, he performed Ravel's Piano Concerto with Colorado Symphony and Beethoven's Piano Concerto No. 1 with the Los Angeles Philharmonic. In July, Tao, together with violinist Stefan Jackiw and cellist Jay Campbell, who frequently perform as the JCT Trio, played Beethoven's Triple Concerto with Chautauqua Symphony Orchestra in July. The same month, with Cleveland Orchestra, he played Prokofiev's Piano Concerto No. 3, and with the New York Philharmonic at Bravo! Vail, he played Beethoven's Piano Concerto No. 2. Also in 2019, Tao gave a recital at Carnegie Hall's Weill Recital Hall.

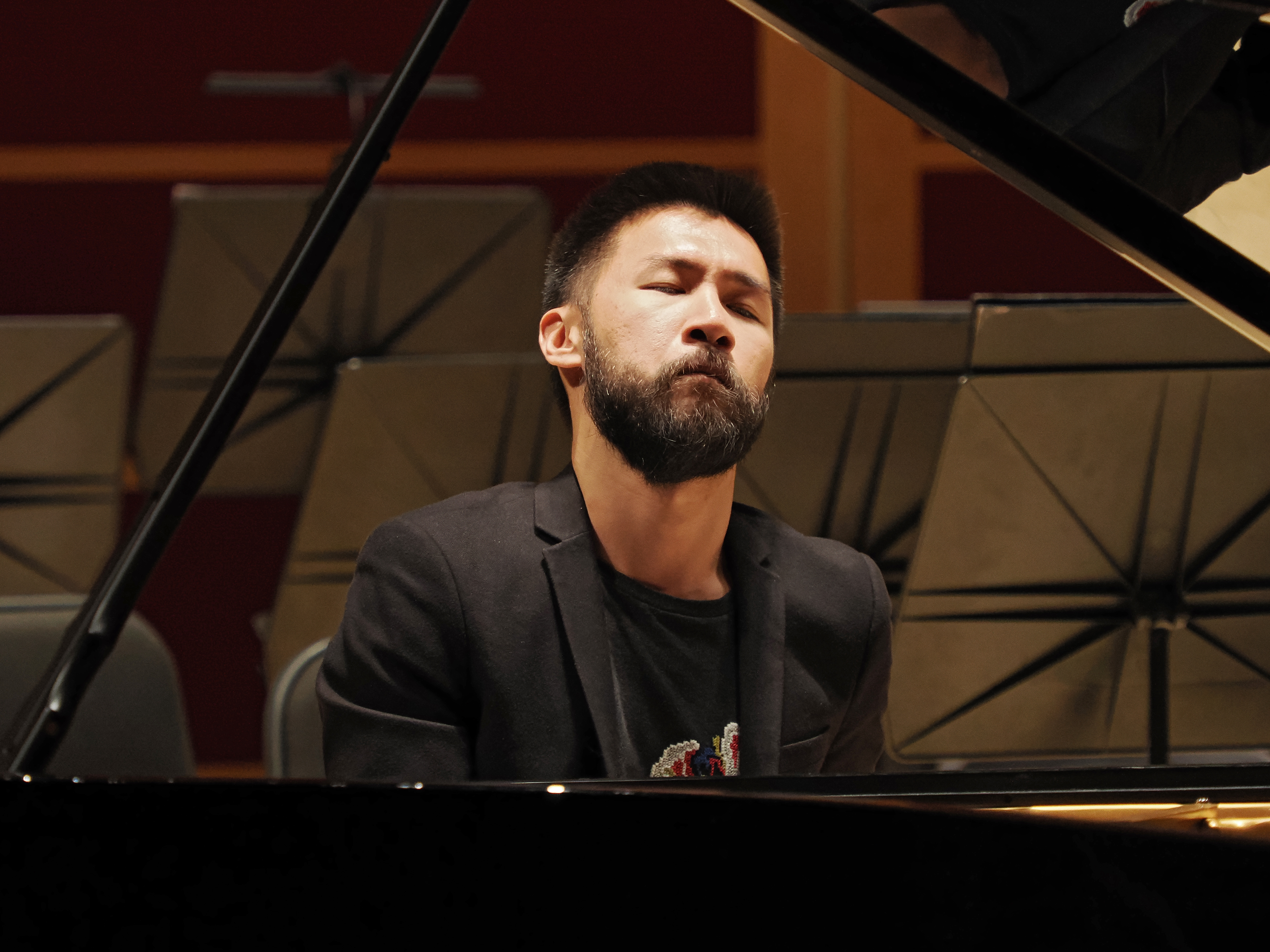
Tao performing Gershwin's Rhapsody in Blue with the Santa Rosa Symphony, 2024

In 2024, PBS recorded Tao performing Bach's Keyboard Concerto #4 in A major, BWV 1055, with Jonathon Heyward conducting, for the program Lincoln Center Presents followed by an encore solo performance of Elliott Carter's "Caténaires" (2006). The same year, Tao won the Andrew Wolf Chamber Music Award. In January 2025, he played a recital at Carnegie Hall's Zankel Hall. Commissioned by the Jacksonville Symphony, Tao premiered his piano concerto, Clang and Shudder, in April. The following month, Tao stepped in at the last moment to replace the ailing Alice Sara Ott, playing Beethoven's Fourth Piano Concerto with the Minnesota Orchestra. In June Tao revisited Rachmaninoff's Piano Concert No. 2 with the New Jersey Symphony for their season finale.

== Reputation as a pianist ==
=== Teenage performances ===
Rick Schulz of the Los Angeles Times wrote of a concert by the 16-year-old Tao: "In a dashing account of Rachmaninoff's Rhapsody, his attacks were crisp, with rhythmically tricky high-velocity passages cleanly articulated. ... Tao avoided sentimentality, his concentration drawing us into the composer's spare and witty work as few virtuosos of any age can do." Of his 2012 performance of Tchaikovsky's Piano Concerto No. 1, Catherine Reese Newton of The Salt Lake Tribune commented: "Not only did Tao demonstrate prodigious technique and a decisive attack in the ... outer movements of the concerto, he showed reflective musicianship in the slow movement. [His] encore [was] a dazzling performance of Liszt's Hungarian Rhapsody No. 6." Of Tao's Prokofiev Piano Sonata No. 7, Justin Davidson wrote in New York Magazine: "No 17-year-old should be able to do justice to one of the most bleakly adult pieces in the literature, yet he played it with aggressive charm and flashes of genuine wisdom." Lawrence Johnson of The Detroit News reviewed Tao's performance the same year of Saint-Saëns' Piano Concerto No. 2:

"Tao blew the doors off [the concerto] with a performance that was no less seductive in its lyrical beauty than hair-raising in its technical brilliance. ... The opening ... an expansive toccata-like solo flight, provided the perfect stage to announce a pianist of formidable technique, acute sensibility and excellent training. ... The concerto proper bore out every promise of the unaccompanied prelude. Tao's playing displayed fine shades of color and intensity, whether the passage at hand demanded reflection or flamboyance. ... Surely as impressive as the young pianist's capacity for whirlwind speed was his poetic disposition and the sheer finesse that ruled his playing."

At the 2012 Aspen Music Festival, Tao "delivered the most arresting performance, attacking [Gershwin's] Second Rhapsody with a lethal combination of power, rhythmic thrust, technical perfection and sheer joy." The following year, on less than three days' notice to replace an ailing pianist, Tao played Prokofiev's Piano Concerto No. 3 "with insouciant ease and apparent enjoyment ... flair and musicality". Of Tao's performance of all five of Beethoven's piano concerti that year, David Fleshler commented in South Florida Classical Review: "The mastery he displayed was more than the predictable brilliance of the grown-up prodigy, it was a performance that brought out the nobility, the eloquence and the dramatic power of these works." Larry Lapidus of The Spokesman-Review called the five concerti "a richly rewarding – indeed, unforgettable – musical experience" noting, that "Tao played the lengthy and difficult Concerto No. 1 ... without a flaw: not a missed or imperfectly struck note, not a careless or routine phrase, not a poorly voiced chord." Richard Todd of the Ottawa Citizen termed Tao's Piano Concerto No. 19 by Mozart, with National Arts Centre Orchestra in Ottawa, Canada, "almost startling in its clarity of sound and purpose."

=== 2014–2018 ===
In 2014, Matt Dixon wrote of Tao's Prokofiev Piano Concerto No. 3: "The level of precision on display was beyond impressive, and the closing minutes of the third and final movement revealed an energy that was simply exhilarating. Tao's ... approach to the music itself was dynamic, unusually expressive, and engaging, with the technical mastery always serving to aid in the interpretation." Margaret Sandresky of the Winston-Salem Journal commented of his Rachmaninoff Rhapsody: "Tao ... realized with ease both the prodigious technical difficulties and the many varied expressive demands of the piece, leading the orchestra players on a merry chase as the difficult passage work streamed from his fingers like mercury." Scott Smith of The Baltimore Sun stated of his performance of Shostakovich Piano Concerto No. 1 that Tao possesses "an ability to communicate clearly, no matter how thorny a score may become ... Tao brought remarkable spontaneity and colorful phrasing. ... There was always musicality, not just virtuosity". Of his Rachmaninoff Rhapsody, Gregory Sullivan Isaacs of TheaterJones judged that Tao "displayed impeccable technique ... clean and crystal clear, bordering on brittle. Some warmth throughout, not just in the lush melodic parts, would have been welcome. ... This is not to say that his performance lacked nuance, because there were many lovely turns of phrases. However, it left the impression that he was impatient to get through the slow parts and back to the flights of virtuosity. ... But there is no denying Tao's brilliance and technical mastery. All of the above reservations about the performance are the sins of the young."

In the Mozart Piano Concerto No. 21 in 2015, according to Matt Palm of the Orlando Sentinel, "Tao's energetic work blended seamlessly with his fellow musicians to create both elegance and exuberance." Scott Cantrell of The Dallas Morning News called Tao's Aaron Copland piano sonata "gripping ... finely timed and layered, but the rhythmic quirks of the scherzo would have been set in higher relief at a marginally slower pace", and thought of his Rachmaninoff Études-Tableaux, Op. 39 that "the F-sharp minor felt a bit pressed, and the D minor was pushed and pulled about too much. The A minor ... was ravishing, though, and the D major was genuinely exciting". Steven Kruger of New York Arts wrote that Tao's "was the best performance of the Rachmaninoff Paganini Variations I have ever heard, on or off disc. Tao was so vivid, he might as well have been Gershwin at the keyboard. Every note was electric. And the last movement of the Prokofiev Seventh Sonata, offered as an encore, simply made everyone's jaw drop." Peter Dobrin of Philly.com wrote that, in Saint-Saëns' Piano Concerto No. 2, Tao "kept his monstrous technique on a leash [and] used it for sincerity and wit – waiting a split second in certain entrances for a flash of humor, or holding back for emphasis. The opening was moving, and the way he paced mounting intensity in the last minutes uncovered the best in this work". In a performance of Rachmaninoff's Piano Concerto No. 3 in 2016, John Shulson of The Virginia Gazette commented that Tao's "performance ... was one of the most thrilling to be heard on stage with this symphony. ... Tao was the master of the Rachmaninoff and its many moods, offering inspired lyricism and ponderous power."

John Pitcher of Nashville Scene wrote that, in the Grieg, Tao "emphasized the concerto’s showy side [but] there was more ... than mere razzle-dazzle. He was an imaginative tonal colorist who used the piano’s sustain pedal to create a wash of prismatic overtones." He also commented, of Tao's encore, Carter's "fiendishly difficult, cerebral" piece, "Caténaires", that "the audience listened with breathless excitement. In the end, they roared their approval, giving Tao a sustained ovation." In the Ottawa Citizen, Natasha Gauthier judged that Tao "brought an original, modernist sensibility" to the Schumann Concerto and Beethoven's Emperor Concerto. She noted:

Tao has a trick of subtly emphasizing bass lines and syncopations in a way that sounds fresh yet organic, never forced or overblown. He has huge technique and facility, but it's his relaxed, almost jazzy approach to the music that stood out. The Schumann was all restless energy and shifting, interior light. The Beethoven had a lively, prancing magnificence, vivid as a film. An encore of "Caténaires" ... had both meticulous control and lethal attack.

Of Tao's performance of Schumann's piano concerto with the Pacific Symphony, Ken Iisaka of San Francisco Classical Voice commented: "With clear, articulate lines, Robert Schumann's passionate ardor towards Clara was expressed with determination, through deliberate tempos. Rather than letting the music be overly sentimental, rendering it a torrent of rage, Tao illustrated its volatile, bipolar personality with an unusual level of clarity and dryness. It almost felt as if the music gave a third-person account of the composer, rather than the music being by Schumann himself. Tao’s fresh perspective laid strong emphasis on the music’s architecture." Another reviewer thought that, in his rendition of Rhapsody in Blue, Tao "bent the rhythms at times, showing his mastery of jazz style without disturbing his rapport with the accompanying [Asheveille Symphony] orchestra. He found connections and bridges that I had been unaware of, observed pauses that emphasized the importance of silence in the midst of music, and generally convinced the audience that this was a performance to remember." Anthony Tommasini of The New York Times reviewed one of Tao's "Crypt Sessions" recitals at the Church of the Intercession in Harlem, New York (Tao substituted on two days' notice for an ailing David Greilsammer), writing:

In the crypt, the sheer volume of Mr. Tao's sound during frenzied climaxes [of Frederic Rzewski's "Which Side Are You On?"] was near-deafening, yet exhilarating. ... It was fascinating, though, to hear Mr. Tao draw out every dissonance-statured, vehement element of [Copland's piano] sonata while also bringing affecting tranquillity to the pensive conclusion of the last movement."

Of his 2018 performance of Gershwin's Concerto in F with the Buffalo Philharmonic, Mary Kunz Goldman wrote: "Tao has a fine percussive touch. He hammers away at the piece with flawless staccato energy. ... The end of the first movement was so tumultuous and perfectly calibrated that the crowd burst into illicit applause. The Andante movement had a bluesy, bittersweet quality. The concluding Allegro brought Tao back to attack mode. ... The snap-bang ending brought the listeners to their feet ... happy and shouting." Mark Gresham, writing in ArtsATL called Tao's performance of Shostakovich's Piano Concerto No. 1 "brilliantly virtuosic", and he joined the critics who have particularly remarked upon Tao's playing of his encore, "Caténaires", calling it "perhaps the most adventurous encore to be heard on the ASO stage in a long, long time. ... It was by far the ear-opener of the evening."

=== 2019–present ===
Reviewing Tao's 2019 debut with Cleveland Orchestra, Zachary Lewis commented: "Technique? Tao had it in spades. He [found] warmth, nuance, and haunting expression where many see little more than virtuoso display. [Besides] a ferocious but still sparkling third movement ... the highlight was the Andantino. ... Tao ably guided his listeners through the eerie, twisted thicket that is a set of variations, conversing gently with his colleagues all the way. Of his 2026 performance of Rachmaninoff's Piano Concerto No. 2, the reviewer for NJArts.net thought Tao "sailed through the work’s technical demands – including the explosive maestoso section and the tricky più mosso section – with finesse. Personal touches, such as a jazz-infused filigree in the final crescendo of the Moderato, abounded. ... with sensitive playing by Tao in the slower, quieter solos of the Adagio and in the profound sections of the main theme."

== Recordings ==
In early 2012, Tao released his first solo recording with EMI Classics, an EP, The Juilliard Sessions: Conrad Tao Plays Debussy and Stravinsky. Justin Davidson wrote of this album, "he plays his confidently poetic Three Songs, which hold their own with a pair of Debussy preludes and Stravinsky's Three Movements from Petrushka." Peter Joelson wrote: "The Debussy Preludes are thoroughly in his bones, but the Stravinsky I must say is given a breathtakingly good account. Technically faultless and interpretively mature, this is a knock-out." The same year, Tao released a synthpop album, Eyelids, and a recording of Mozart's Piano Concertos Nos. 17 and 25 with Santa Fe Pro Musica Orchestra.

In early 2013, Tao released an album, Gordon Getty: Piano Pieces, on the PENTATONE label. Tao's debut full-length solo album, on EMI Classics, Voyages, featuring Tao's compositions together with pieces by Meredith Monk, Rachmaninoff and Ravel, was released on June 11, 2013. The album reached No. 8 on the Billboard Classical Albums chart. Allmusic rates the album four stars out of five. Davidson wrote: "The playing induces shivers. The [Rachmaninoff] C minor prelude (Op. 23, No. 7) gushes out in quiet cataracts, lyrical and shimmering, a tour de force of delicacy and power." Despite Tao's skepticism about a classical music establishment that is "grossly normative, capitalistic, and steeped in established, unchallenged practices", commented one reviewer, Voyages is "perfect in all the conventional ways: masterfully performed and composed ... cleanly produced, and impeccably sequenced. ... It's an absolute joy to hear him fly through each of these pieces, the essences of which are not overwhelmed but rather recontextualized, given new life ... [Tao] has the creative mind to think of them in new ways." Fanfare magazine also gave the album a very warm review, and the producers of the album were nominated for a Grammy Award. A reviewer for NPR wrote:

Tao proves himself to be a musician of deep intellectual and emotional means. ... Tao [is] a prodigiously talented pianist ... but he also emerges as a thoughtful and mature composer, as his four-movement Vestiges for solo piano demonstrates. ... [W]hat's going to matter ... to listeners is what he makes them feel – and on Voyages, the pianist journeys along varied and alluring pathways, from the dreamy contemplation of the Ravel "Ondine (Wave)" movement to the jaggedly darting "upon being" section from his Vestiges. His playing is strong and sure, and the effect is transcendent and beautiful.

In 2015, Tao released Pictures, an album of piano music, on the Warner Classics label. It features Mussorgsky's Pictures at an Exhibition, together with works by Elliott Carter, Toru Takemitsu, David Lang and Tao. In 2019 he released another album, American Rage. He followed this in 2021 with Bricolage together with the brass quartet The Westerlies.
