= Martin Kennedy (composer) =

British-born American composer (born 1978)

Martin Kennedy (born March 24, 1978) is a pianist and composer of contemporary classical music.

== Early life and education ==
Martin Kennedy was born in Wakefield, England to Barry and Ann Kennedy, and moved with them as a young child to the United States. He grew up in Pennsylvania and Tuscaloosa, Alabama, where he attended Central High School. As a youth, he played piano and composed pieces for the Tuscaloosa Children's Theatre, Theatre Tuscaloosa and the Frank M. Moody Concert Hall, winning national awards and recognition for his work. He earned a Bachelor of Music degree in piano performance and composition, as well as a Master of Music in composition, from the Jacobs School of Music. In 2005, he received his Doctorate in Music Composition from the Juilliard School where he studied as a C.V. Starr fellow under Milton Babbitt and Samuel Adler.

== Career ==
After receiving his doctorate, Kennedy became assistant professor of theory and composition at the Department of Music in the College of Arts and Sciences at Washington University in St. Louis. He has written extensively for orchestra, chamber ensembles, and solo instruments, working with Tuscaloosa Symphony Orchestra music director Shin-ik Hahm and pianist Molly Morkoski. In 2015, Kennedy was director of composition and theory at the music department of Central Washington University. In 2023, he wrote a "Bandshell Fanfare" for the 100th anniversary of the Naumburg Bandshell's opening, performed at the Naumburg Orchestral Concerts, in the Naumburg Bandshell, Central Park, in the summer series.

== Awards and recognition ==
Kennedy's awards include first prize in the '2 Agosto' International Composing Competition, five ASCAP Morton Gould Young Composer Awards, a BMI Young Composer Award, the 1999 Raymond Hubbel award, the Indiana University Dean's Prize in composition in 1998 and 2002, the 2010 ASCAP Rudolf Nissim Prize for Best Orchestral Work, the Suzanne and Lee Ettleson Prize, an Aaron Copland Award, and residencies at the MacDowell and Yaddo artist colonies. He was Composer-In-Residence for the Alabama Symphony Orchestra. His music is published by Theodore Presser Company and G. Schirmer Inc.

== Selected works ==
=== Orchestral works ===
- Drift (2021)
- Forest Dark and Stars Above (2018)
- Siren, blind (2016)
- Three Pieces for Orchestra (1999)

=== Concerti ===
- Pull Pin and Throw for trombone and orchestra (2021)
- Violin Concerto (2020)
- Sonata for violin and orchestra (John Corigliano, arr. Kennedy) (2012)
- Trivial Pursuits for violin and orchestra (2009)
- Piano Concerto (2008)
- Totentanz for violin and orchestra (Franz Liszt, arr. Kennedy and Lara St. John) (2007)
- Flute Concerto (1999)

=== Chamber music ===
- Dry Falls for two guitars (2021)
- An Affirmation for chamber choir (2015)
- Distant Channels for bass trombone and percussion (2014)
- Czardashian Rhapsody (arr.) for violin and piano (2013)
- Desplazamiento for piccolo and piano (2013)
- Trivial Pursuits for violin and piano (2009)
- Four Songs for flute and piano (1998)
- These Parting Gifts for two violins and piano (1997)
- Souvenir for flute and piano (1995)
