= Randy Wong =

American arts administrator and double bassist

Randy Wong is an American arts administrator and double bassist based in Honolulu, Hawaiʻi. He is president and chief executive officer of the Hawaii Youth Symphony. He also performs as a bassist with the Hawaiʻi Symphony Orchestra. Wong is a co-founder and bandleader of the exotica- and jazz-oriented ensemble the Waitiki 7.

== Career ==
=== Hawaii Youth Symphony ===
Wong became executive director of the Hawaii Youth Symphony in 2012 and was later promoted to president. A 2014 feature in MidWeek described him as the youngest executive director in the organization's history and profiled his background as a former Hawaii Youth Symphony student musician and educator.

In 2020, Hawaii Business Magazine interviewed Wong about the organization's operations and programming during the COVID-19 pandemic. In 2025, Hawaiʻi Public Radio interviewed Wong about the Hawaii Youth Symphony's 60th anniversary programming and community activities.

=== Performer ===
Wong is listed as a bassist with the Hawaii Symphony on the orchestra's roster of musicians.

=== Waitiki 7 ===
Wong is a co-founder of the Waitiki 7, an ensemble associated with contemporary interpretations of mid-20th-century exotica and jazz. Coverage of the group has appeared in national and regional music publications, including JazzTimes, which profiled the band's 2025 album Exotica Reborn: In Studio and Live at House Without a Key and identified Wong as its leader. The ensemble has also been discussed by WBUR in the context of contemporary revivals of lounge and exotica music.

== Education ==
A 2014 MidWeek profile reported that Wong earned a bachelor's degree in classical music performance from the New England Conservatory and a master's degree in arts in education from Harvard University, and noted additional graduate study at Carnegie Mellon University.

== Selected discography ==
With the WAITIKI 7:

- Adventures in Paradise (2009)
- Sounds of Exotica (2010)
- Exotica Reborn: In Studio and Live at House Without a Key (2025)

== Reception ==
Wong's work as an arts administrator has been covered in local and regional media, including feature coverage in MidWeek and an interview in Hawaii Business Magazine focused on nonprofit leadership during the COVID-19 pandemic. As a bandleader and co-founder of the Waitiki 7, Wong has been featured in coverage by JazzTimes, All About Jazz, and WBUR discussing the group's recordings and role in contemporary exotica and jazz performance.
