= Kirill Gerstein =

Russian-American concert pianist

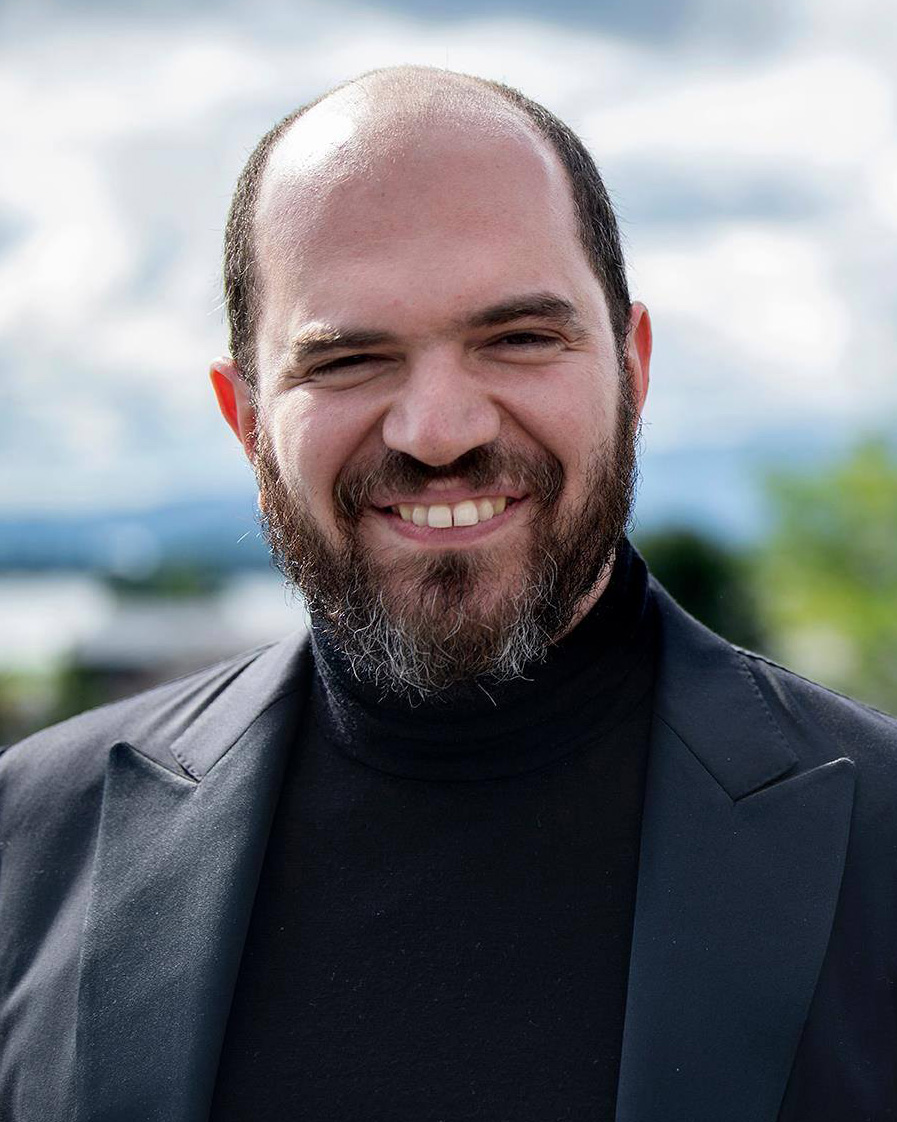
- 2020
- Born: 23 October 1979 (age 47); Voronezh
- Education: Manhattan School of Music
- Occupations: Pianist; Harpsichordist; Academic teacher
- Organizations: Hochschule für Musik "Hanns Eisler"
- Awards: Arthur Rubinstein International Piano Master Competition; Gilmore Artist Award

Kirill Gerstein (Russian: Кирилл Герштейн) (born 23 October 1979) is a Russian-American concert pianist. He is the sixth recipient of the Gilmore Artist Award. Born in the former Soviet Union, Gerstein is an American citizen based in Berlin. Between 2007-2017, he led piano classes at the Stuttgart Musik Hochschule. In 2018, he took up the post of Professor of Piano at the Hanns Eisler Hochschule in Berlin in addition to the Kronberg Academy’s Sir András Schiff Performance Programme for Young Artists.

== Early life and education ==
Gerstein was born in Voronezh in the former Soviet Union to a Russian Jewish family and began playing the piano at the age of two. At the age of 12, he won his first competition - the International Bach Competition in Gorzów, Poland. Though he formally studied classical piano, he also learned to play jazz by listening to his parents' record collection. At the age of 14, he met jazz vibraphonist Gary Burton at a festival in St. Petersburg which led to a full-scholarship offer to study jazz piano at Boston's Berklee College of Music. Gerstein was the youngest student ever admitted to the school.

Following his time at Berklee, Gerstein attended New York's Manhattan School of Music, where he studied with Solomon Mikowsky, earning both his Bachelor's and Master's of Music degrees in four years. He continued his studies in Madrid with Dmitri Bashkirov at Queen Sofía College of Music and in Budapest with Ferenc Rados.

== Career ==
Kirill Gerstein made his major orchestral debut in September 2000 performing Brahms's Piano Concerto No. 1 with David Zinman and the Tonhalle-Orchester Zürich and has since built a career as a major international concert artist.

As a soloist, Gerstein has performed with the National Symphony Orchestra, the Los Angeles and New York Philharmonics, the Philadelphia and Minnesota Orchestras, and the Atlanta, Baltimore, Boston, Chicago, Cincinnati, Dallas, Detroit, Houston, Indianapolis, Montreal, St. Louis, San Francisco, and Toronto Symphonies, among other North American orchestras. Abroad, he has performed with such orchestras as the Berlin, Czech, Munich, Rotterdam, London Symphony Orchestra and London Philharmonics, the City of Birmingham Symphony Orchestra, Leipzig Gewandhaus Orchestra, Staatskapelle Dresden, Finnish Radio Symphony Orchestra, Sofia Philharmonic, Royal Concertgebouw Orchestra, Tonkünstler Orchestra in Vienna, WDR Symphony Orchestra Cologne, and the Zürich Tonhalle, as well as with the NHK Symphony Orchestra in Tokyo and the Taipei Symphony Orchestra.

Gerstein's festival appearances include engagements with the Aspen Music Festival, Blossom Festival with the Cleveland Orchestra, Chicago's Grant Park Music Festival, Ravinia Festival with the Chicago Symphony Orchestra, Tanglewood with the Boston Symphony, Santa Fe Chamber Music Festival, and—with the Philadelphia Orchestra—Bravo! Vail, Mann Music Center, and Saratoga Chamber Music Festival. He debuted at the Salzburg Festival playing solo repertoire and piano-duo works with András Schiff. He has also performed at the Lucerne Festival, Jerusalem International Chamber Music Festival, and the BBC Proms.

Early honors and awards include First Prize at the 2001 Arthur Rubinstein International Piano Master Competition and the 2002 Gilmore Young Artist Award.

In January 2010, Gerstein was announced as the sixth recipient of the Gilmore Artist Award, which recognizes "extraordinary piano artistry" once every four years with a $300,000 prize. Previous winners include Leif Ove Andsnes from Norway, Piotr Anderszewski from Poland, and Ingrid Fliter from Argentina. With the prize money, Gerstein has been able to commission new works from Timo Andres, Chick Corea, Alexander Goehr, Oliver Knussen, Thomas Adès and Brad Mehldau, with additional commissions scheduled for future performance.

In April 2010, Gerstein was awarded Lincoln Center's Avery Fisher Career Grant.

In 2015, Gerstein's recording of Tchaikovsky's Piano Concerto No. 1 and Prokofiev's Piano Concerto No. 2, with the Deutsches Symphonie-Orchester Berlin led by James Gaffigan, was honored with an ECHO Klassik Award as the "Concerto Recording of the Year." This recording marked the world premiere of the Tchaikovsky concerto in its 1879 urtext edition, which reflects the way the composer himself conducted the concerto before a series of posthumous edits were made to the score. Based on Tchaikovsky's own conducting score from his last public concert, the new critical edition was published in 2015 by the Tchaikovsky Museum in Klin, tying in with Tchaikovsky's 175th anniversary and marking 140 years since the concerto's world premiere in Boston, in 1875. For the recording, Kirill was granted special pre-publication access to the new edition. On March 15, 2022, he was the soloist of Ravel’s concerto for the left hand in the concert given at the Berliner Philharmonie in support of the Ukrainian people, with the Deutsches Symphonie-Orchester Berlin under Alan Gilbert.

== Awards ==
- 2001: Arthur Rubinstein International Piano Master Competition, First Prize
- 2002: Gilmore Young Artist Award
- 2010: Gilmore Artist Award
- 2010: Avery Fisher Career Grant

== Discography ==
Kirill Gerstein records for the Cologne-based independent record label myrios classics but has also appeared on recordings released by Deutsche Grammophon, Decca Classics and LAWO Classics.

Year	Recordings	Label
2020	Kirill Gerstein & Thomas Adès Three Mazurkas Berceuse from The Exterminating Angel (world premiere recording) Concert paraphrase on Powder her face for two pianos (world premiere recording) In Seven Days with the Tanglewood Music Centre Orchestra and Thomas Adès, conductor and piano	myrios classics
2020	Adès Conducts Adès Concerto for Piano and Orchestra Totentanz with the Boston Symphony Orchestra and Thomas Adès, conductor; Mark Stone, baritone; Christianne Stotijn, mezzo-soprano	Deutsche Grammophon
2020	Strauss: Enoch Arden with Bruno Ganz	myrios classics
2019	Brahms: Piano Quintet in F minor, Op. 34 with the Hagen Quartett	myrios classics
2019	Tchaikovsky Project Boxset: Piano Concerto Nos. 1-3 with the Czech Philharmonic and Semyon Bychkov, conductor	Decca Classics
2019	Busoni: Piano Concerto with the Boston Symphony Orchestra, Men of the Tanglewood Festival Chorus and Sakari Oramo, conductor	myrios classics
2018	Scriabin: Symphony No. 1 and Prometheus: The Poem of Fire with the Oslo Philharmonic and Vasily Petrenko, conductor	LAWO Classics
2018	The Gershwin Moment Rhapsody in Blue Concerto in F Somebody Loves Me I Got Rhythm Blame it on my Youth Summertime Embraceable You with the St Louis Symphony Orchestra and David Robertson, conductor; Gary Burton, vibraphone; Storm Large, vocals	myrios classics
2017	Scriabin: Symphony No. 2 and Piano Concerto, Op. 20 with the Oslo Philharmonic and Vasily Petrenko, conductor	LAWO Classics
2016	Liszt: Transcendental Études	myrios classics
2015	Tchaikovsky: Piano Concerto No. 1 (1879 version - world premiere recording) Prokofiev: Piano Concerto No. 2 with the Deutsches Symphonie-Orchester Berlin and James Gaffigan, conductor	myrios classics
2014	Imaginary Pictures Mussorgsky: Pictures at an Exhibition Schumann: Carnaval	myrios classics
2012	Sonatas for Viola & Piano, Vol. 2 with Tabea Zimmermann, viola Brahms: Sonata for Viola and Piano in F minor, Op. 120, No. 1 Schubert: Sonata for Arpeggione and Piano in A minor, D. 821 Franck: Sonata for Violin (Viola) and Piano in A	myrios classics
2010	Sonatas for Viola & Piano, Vol. 1 with Tabea Zimmermann, viola Clarke: Sonata for Viola and Piano Vieuxtemps: Sonata for Viola and Piano in B-Flat, Op. 36 Brahms: Sonata for Viola and Piano in E-Flat, Op. 120, No. 2	myrios classics
2010	Schumann: Humoresque Knussen: Ophelia's Last Dance Liszt: Sonata in B minor	
