= Huntsville Symphony Orchestra =

Orchestra in Huntsville, Alabama, founded 1955

The Huntsville Symphony Orchestra is a symphonic orchestra located in Huntsville, Alabama. The current conductor and music director is Gregory Vajda. Vajda has been the conductor since the 2011–2012 season. The orchestra's resident conductor is Joseph Lee.^{7}

== History ==
The Huntsville Symphony was founded in the fall of 1955 by Alvin Dreger, a cellist from Huntsville, and Arthur Fraser, a conductor from Montevallo.^{3} They sent letters to local musicians and invited them to join the region's first orchestra.^{3} Forty musicians participated, many of whom were scientists in German rocket scientist Wernher von Braun's team.^{4} The symphony's first conductor was Dr. Arthur M. Fraser.^{3}

The HSO is the oldest continuously operating professional orchestra in the state of Alabama.^{6} Past conductors include Arthur Fraser (1954–1959), Russell Gerhart (1959–1971), Marx Pales (1971–1988), Taavo Virkhaus (1989–2003) and Carlos Miguel Prieto (2003–2011).^{5}

The yearly concert programs include a Classical series, a Pops series and a "Casual Classics" series.^{5} Notable guest performers have included renowned cellist Yo-Yo Ma, the Canadian Brass and classical guitarist Manuel Barrueco.^{1} Hungarian composer Máté Balogh dedicated his piece Alabama March to the orchestra on the bicentennial of the State of Alabama in 2019.^{5}

== Current leadership ==
Gregory Vajda is the orchestra's sixth and current conductor. He is recognized by many other organizations for his talents. Included are music director of the Portland Festival Symphony; principal guest conductor of the Hungarian Radio Symphony; artistic director of Hungary's UMZE New Music Ensemble; artist in residence of France's Ensemble Ars Nova; and program director of the Peter Eötvös Contemporary Music Foundation. Previously he was music director of the International Armel Opera Festival and of Music in the Mountains Festival, California.^{7}

He has also conducted with the following orchestras: Hamburg State Opera, L’Opéra de Montréal, Palermo Opera, Atlanta Opera, Hungarian State Opera, Ensemble Intercontemporain, Budapest Symphony, Vienna Philharmonic, Frankfurt Radio Symphony, Montréal Symphony, Los Angeles Philharmonic, Louisville Orchestra, Oregon Symphony, Seattle Symphony, and Symphony Silicon Valley.^{7}

He is a highly decorated leader. His awards include the Artisjus Award for his work with contemporary music and the prestigious Bartók-Pásztory Award.^{7}

Vajda attended the Franz Liszt Academy of Music and was a pupil of Peter Eötvös, composer and conductor. He also has a deep family connection to music as his father is the acclaimed soprano, Veronika Kincses.^{7}

== Notable performances and guest musicians ==
=== Notable guests ===
- Yo-Yo Ma^{5}
- Manuel Barrueco^{5}
- Máté Balogh^{5}

=== List of performances ===
- "Frankenstein!! (Superman)" (May 5, 2023) - performed at Randolph School
- Summer Night Symphony: The Fourth Wall (August 19, 2023)
- Tchaikovsky Vilolin Concerto (September 22, 2023)
- "Table Music" A Dinner Concert (September 24, 2023)
- The Music of Rocky Horror (October 20, 2023)
- Towards the Unknown Region (November 3, 2023)
- The Gospel According to Gershwin (December 31, 2023)
- Scheherazade (January 20, 2024)
- Carnival of Animals (February 10, 2024)
- Mozart and Mendelssohn (February 10, 2024)
- The Magic of Michael Grandinetti (March 23, 2024)
- Musical Walk with HSO (March 24, 2024)
- Mahler and Rachmaninov (April 13, 2024)
- Harry Potter and the Prisoner of Akaban in Concert (April 26-27, 2024) - not an HSO exclusive production^{2}
- May be the Fourth be with You (May 4, 2024)

== Connections to youth orchestra ==
The Huntsville Symphony Orchestra works in connection with the Huntsville Youth Orchestra (HYO) to nurture the next generation of artists. In 1961, Russel Gerhart, the founding conductor of the Huntsville Symphony, founded HYO to train the local youth.^{13}

== See also ==
- Alabama Symphony Orchestra
- Mobile Symphony Orchestra
- Tuscaloosa Symphony Orchestra
