= Richard Westerfield =

American conductor

Richard Westerfield is an American conductor. He has served as Associate Conductor of the Boston Symphony Orchestra, and has led orchestras such as the Brown University Orchestra, the Harrisburg Symphony Orchestra, and the Alabama Symphony Orchestra.

He came to prominence in 1993 at age 35 when he stepped in at the last minute for three concerts with the New York Philharmonic to fill in for an ailing Erich Leinsdorf, to critical acclaim. At the time, his day job was in JP Morgan's Sovereign Group, helping third-world countries get access to capital markets in the US and Europe. In May 2004, he stepped down from a 6-year tenure as music director of the Alabama Symphony Orchestra.

In 2002, he conducted the Naumburg Orchestral Concerts, in the Naumburg Bandshell, Central Park, in the summer series.
