= The WAITIKI 7 =

- Origin: United States
- Genres: Exotica; jazz
- Years active: 2008–present

The WAITIKI 7 is an American musical ensemble associated with the modern revival of exotica, a mid-20th-century style blending jazz, popular music, and atmospheric sound imagery. The group is led by bassist Randy Wong.

The ensemble has released several recordings since 2009, including Adventures in Paradise (2009), New Sounds of Exotica (2010), and Exotica Reborn: In Studio and Live at House Without a Key (2025).

== History ==
According to a 2010 review in All About Jazz, The WAITIKI 7 was formed in 2008 as an exotica revival ensemble, with a core rhythm section consisting of bassist Randy Wong, drummer Abe Lagrimas Jr., and percussionist Lopaka Colón.

A 2025 feature in JazzTimes identified Wong as the group’s leader and situated The WAITIKI 7 within a broader contemporary resurgence of lounge and exotica-influenced music. The article noted that Exotica Reborn was the ensemble’s first studio recording since 2011.

== Music and style ==
Reviewers have described The WAITIKI 7 as drawing on classic exotica elements—such as mallet percussion, atmospheric textures, and evocations of tropical environments—while incorporating extended jazz improvisation and contemporary jazz harmony.

== Personnel ==
Membership has varied across recordings and performances.

For the album New Sounds of Exotica (2010), All About Jazz listed the following lineup: Randy Wong (bass), Abe Lagrimas Jr. (drums), Lopaka Colón (percussion), Zaccai Curtis (piano), Helen Liu (violin), Tim Mayer (flute and saxophone), and Jim Benoit (vibraphone).

A 2025 JazzTimes feature highlighted an ensemble that included Curtis and Colón and also referenced drummer Harold Chang, described as a veteran performer who appeared on recordings by Martin Denny and Dick Hyman during the 1950s and 1960s.

== Discography ==
- Adventures in Paradise (2009)
- New Sounds of Exotica (2010)
- Exotica Reborn: In Studio and Live at House Without a Key (2025)

== Reception ==
A 2010 review in Honolulu Magazine described exotica as a niche genre and characterized The WAITIKI 7 as part of a contemporary effort to sustain and reinterpret the style, noting the group’s stated connections to musicians associated with classic exotica recordings.

Reviews of Exotica Reborn in 2025 emphasized the project’s combination of studio material and live recordings from performances at the Halekulani hotel’s House Without a Key in Waikīkī.

== See also ==
- Exotica
- Martin Denny
- Arthur Lyman
