= David Epstein (conductor) =

American composer and conductor (1931–2002)

David Mayer Epstein (October 3, 1930 – January 15, 2002) was an American composer, conductor, and music scientist who taught at the Massachusetts Institute of Technology.

He served as director of the Harrisburg Symphony Orchestra from 1974 to 1978, Worcester Orchestra from 1976 to 1980 and served as guest conductor in 28 orchestras across nine countries.

He was the author of Shaping Time: Music, the Brain, and Performance, a work on the neurological basis for various elements of music theory, and co-editor of Beauty and the Brain: Biological Aspects of Aesthetics.
