= Saint Micah =

American pianist, singer, composer, and record producer

- Born: Micah McLaurin; Charleston, South Carolina, U.S.
- Genres: Classical, pop
- Occupations: Pianist, singer, composer, record producer
- Instruments: Piano, vocals
- Website: saintmicah.com

Micah McLaurin, known professionally as Saint Micah, is an American pianist, singer, composer, and record producer. He began his career as a classical concert pianist, receiving the Gilmore Young Artist Award in 2016. He made his debut as a pop vocalist in 2023 and adopted the Saint Micah stage name in 2026.

== Early life and education ==
McLaurin was born in Charleston, South Carolina, and began playing piano at age eight after his grandmother gave his family her old piano. He initially studied with Marsha Gerber and later with Enrique Graf. In 2010, at age 15, he became the youngest performer in the history of the College of Charleston's International Piano Series.

He earned a bachelor's degree from the Curtis Institute of Music, where he studied with Robert McDonald and Gary Graffman, and a master's degree from the Juilliard School, where he studied with Jerome Lowenthal and Yoheved Kaplinsky.

== Classical career ==
In 2010, McLaurin was a co-winner of the Southeastern Piano Festival and placed second at the Ettlingen International Competition for Young Pianists. He received fifth prize at the 2011 Hilton Head International Piano Competition for Young Artists.

At the 2012 Thomas and Evon Cooper International Piano Competition, McLaurin placed third after performing Chopin's Piano Concerto No. 2 with The Cleveland Orchestra conducted by Jahja Ling at Severance Hall. Daniel Hathaway of ClevelandClassical.com called his playing "elastic and poetic" and praised its voicing, while finding his interaction with the orchestra inconsistent.

McLaurin received the 2016 Gilmore Young Artist Award. With the award's commission funding, he commissioned Stephen Hough to write Piano Sonata No. 4 (Vida Breve).

In 2017, McLaurin gave his first Paris recital as part of the Les Pianissimes series. Alain Cochard of Concertclassic praised the richness of his sound, concentration and musical personality. In July 2018, he performed Gershwin's Piano Concerto in F with the Philadelphia Orchestra at the Mann Center. Reviewing the concert for The Philadelphia Inquirer, Peter Dobrin wrote that McLaurin brought out the work's expressive passages and displayed "technique and power to spare".

McLaurin released the live album Micah McLaurin Live in 2020 and the studio album Chopin in 2021.

In June 2023, McLaurin made his Spoleto Festival USA debut in Charleston, performing Grieg's Piano Concerto with the Spoleto Festival USA Orchestra under Jonathon Heyward at the Charleston Gaillard Center. Reviewing the performance for Classical Voice North America, Perry Tannenbaum called McLaurin an "excellent pianist" and described the later stages of the final movement as "crackling with authentic thunder".

== Pop career ==
In 2023, McLaurin released Diamonds, a nine-track instrumental album recorded with the Royal Philharmonic Orchestra at Abbey Road Studios and British Grove Studios. He co-arranged the album with David Campbell, Chris Walden and Robin Smith. Later that year, he made his debut as a vocalist and pop composer with "MOONS", his first original release to feature his vocals.

He released the pop single "Call Me" in 2024. Its music video placed second in the Best Art Director category at the 2025 Berlin Music Video Awards; Victoria Pavon and An Le were credited as its art directors.

In June 2026, McLaurin adopted the stage name Saint Micah and released the dance-pop single "The Grind", created with Fernando Garibay, Ramiro Padilla and Simon Wilcox. Spotify credits him as both a composer and producer on the track. A Dave Audé remix reached number 13 on Music Week's Commercial Pop Club Chart.

In August 2026, he released "Papillon" through Casa Doce Music; KALTBLUT identified Young Jake as its producer. Spotify also credits McLaurin as a composer and Saint Micah as a producer.

== Artistry ==
McLaurin has described his musical reference points as spanning Romantic-era composers such as Chopin, Rachmaninoff and Liszt and pop artists including Lady Gaga, Madonna and Donna Summer. He has said that arranging the standards on Diamonds gave him greater creative control than traditional classical performance and helped him make his approach more accessible.

== Discography ==
The discography below follows the artist's consolidated Spotify catalog.

=== Albums ===
Title	Year	Type
Micah McLaurin Live	2020	Live album
Chopin	2021	Studio album
Diamonds	2023	Studio album

=== Extended plays ===
Title	Year
Call Me	2024
Don't Give Up On Love	2025

=== Singles ===
Title	Year	Notes
"Rhapsody in Blue (Live)"	2020	
"Rhapsody in Gaga"	2022	
"All I Want for Christmas Is You"	2022	
"Diamonds Are a Girl's Best Friend"	2023	
"Moon River"	2023	
"MOONS"	2023	
"MOONS – Leland Remix"	2024	Remix
"Don't Give Up On Love"	2024	
"Let's Go To France"	2024	
"MacArthur Park"	2024	with RILEY
"Don't Give Up On Love (The Remixes)"	2024	Remix release
"Call Me"	2024	
"Medusa"	2024	
"Baboom"	2025	
"Baboom (Lifelike Remix)"	2025	Remix
"Baboom (Danny Verde Remix)"	2025	Remix
"Satisfied"	2025	
"Satisfied (Until Dawn Remix)"	2025	Remix
"Remember Me"	2025	
"Remember Me (Majestic Remix)"	2025	Remix
"Remember Me (Sunset Remix – Until Dawn)"	2025	Remix
"Dancing With My Broken Heart"	2025	
"How Can I"	2026	
"The Grind"	2026	
"The Grind (Dave Audé Remix)"	2026	Remix
"Papillon"	2026	
