= Gregory Vajda =

Hungarian clarinetist, composer and conductor

Gregory Vajda (born Gergely Vajda; August 13, 1973) is a Hungarian clarinetist, composer and conductor.

== Early life and education ==
He was born in Budapest in 1973 to bassoonist József Vajda (1947–2016) and operatic soprano Veronika Kincses. Vajda studied conducting at the Franz Liszt Academy of Music under Professor Ervin Lukács. He was also a conducting and composition pupil of well-known composer and conductor, Péter Eötvös.

== Career ==
=== Conducting ===
Following performances with the Montreal Symphony in Bartók's Bluebeard's Castle and Schoenberg's Erwartung, Gregory Vajda gained international recognition. In 2011, he was appointed the sixth music director of the Huntsville Symphony. After completing his three-year tenure as principal conductor, he was named principal guest conductor of the Hungarian Radio Symphony (MR Symphony) in 2014. Vajda also serves as the artistic director of the International Armel Opera Festival.

In addition to his duties with these organizations, upcoming guest-conducting engagements during 2015-16 season include the Danubia Symphony, the Hungarian State Opera, the Pannon Philharmonic, the Szeged Symphony, the Launaudiere Festival and the Portland Festival Symphony among others.

In 2014/15 Vajda was engaged by the Hamilton Philharmonic, the Omaha Symphony and Symphony Silicon Valley, the Rochester Philharmonic; in 2013/14 by the Phoenix Symphony, Symphony Silicon Valley, Calgary Philharmonic and the Columbus Symphony. In 2012/13 he led the Edmonton Symphony, Kalamazoo Symphony and Santa Barbara Symphony. In Hungary he conducted the Pannon Philharmonic in a semi-staged version of Ligeti's opera Le Grand Macabre, and lead two performances of Lohengrin as part of the Budapest Wagner Days with the Hungarian National Opera Orchestra. In July he concluded his artistic director and conductor position with Music in the Mountains, CA – a position held since 2009.

The 2011/12 season combined he returned to the Seattle Symphony and Edmonton Symphony with his debut leading the Toledo Symphony, while highlights of 2010/11 included a subscription series with the Oregon Symphony featuring the US premiere of his work "Duevoe," a return to Atlanta Opera conducting La bohème, and re-engagements to the Baltimore Symphony, Edmonton Symphony, Symphony Silicon Valley and Round Top Festival. Debuts with the Louisiana Philharmonic and Huntsville Symphony rounded out the season.

Vajda's 2009/10 season began with a stint at the Hungarian Radio Symphony Orchestra, followed by his first return to the Hungarian State Opera since emigrating to the US. In his adopted country he led subscription concerts with the Oregon Symphony, debuts with the Seattle, Grand Rapids and Memphis symphonies, and returned to the San Antonio Symphony and Symphony Silicon Valley.

Season 2008/09 marked the conductor's introduction to the Salzburg Festival as assistant conductor to Peter Eötvös. He conducted the final performance of Bartok’sBluebeard's Castle with the Vienna Philharmonic and Vienna State Opera Chorus, before returning to the Atlanta Opera to lead La Cenerentola. On the orchestra stage, he conducted the Toronto, Edmonton, San Antonio, and Silicon Valley symphonies. He also helped inaugurate the widely talked-about EMPAC at the Rensselaer Polytechnic Institute (NY) with a performance of Grabstein für Stephan by György Kurtag.

While assistant conductor with the Milwaukee Symphony, a position he relinquished in 2005, Gregory Vajda led several regional tours and had opportunities to conduct the Canadian Brass, Maureen McGovern, the KingSingers, as well as the Milwaukee Symphony in a yearlyclassical subscription series. In past seasons, Vajda appeared with St. Paul Chamber Orchestra, the Milwaukee Chamber Orchestra, the Calgary Philharmonic, the Winnipeg, Louisville, Charlotte and Omaha symphonies, the National Arts Centre Orchestra in Ottawa, Ensemble Intercontemporain, led the Klangforum Vienna in performances of Péter Eötvös’ As I Crossed a Bridge of Dreams and Three Sisters (as part of the Wiener Festwochen), gave the premiere of his chamber opera The Giantbaby at the New Theatre in Budapest, and the premiere of Hungarian composer György Ránki's opera King Pomade's New Clothes at the Hungarian State Opera. He has also conducted at the festivals of Avignon and Strasbourg, at the Woodstock Mozart Festival, Grant Park Festival and the Mostly Mozart Festival in Lincoln Center.

In 2003-05, he conducted the Naumburg Orchestral Concerts, in the Naumburg Bandshell, Central Park, in the summer series.

Vajda has been resident conductor of the Oregon Symphony, based in Portland, Oregon, since 2005; the 2012–2013 season marks his last with the orchestra.

In 2009, Vajda began serving as artistic and music director of Music in the Mountains, based in California. More recently, Vajda was named music director and conductor of the Huntsville Symphony Orchestra in Huntsville, Alabama.

=== Composing ===
In addition to conducting, Vajda is also a gifted clarinetist and composer. He conducted his own composition for the silent film The Crowd at the Auditorium of the Louvre, with American pianist Jay Gottlieb. He has also recorded his piece Duevoe with the Hungarian Radio Symphony Orchestra. He was honored with the Zoltán Kodály State Scholarship for composers for the year 2000, and the Annie Fischer State Scholarship for music performers in the year 1999.
