= Harrisburg Symphony Orchestra =

American orchestra

- Orchestra
- Short name: HSO
- Founded: 1930
- Location: Harrisburg, Pennsylvania
- Concert hall: Forum Auditorium
- Music director: Stuart Malina
- Website: harrisburgsymphony.org

The Harrisburg Symphony Orchestra (HSO) is an American orchestra based in Harrisburg, Pennsylvania, United States. The orchestra membership consists of professional musicians drawn from Central Pennsylvania, and from cities including Philadelphia, Baltimore, Washington, D.C., and New York. The orchestra's musicians are represented by the American Federation of Musicians (AFM) Local 294, and the orchestra is a member of the Regional Orchestra Players' Association (ROPA) and the League of American Orchestras.

== History ==
Attempts to create a Harrisburg orchestra date to 1910, when the Dauphin County courts chartered a Harrisburg orchestra under George W. Updegrove. Another attempt in 1928 was also unsuccessful.

Planning for the present orchestra dates to the spring of 1927, and discussions began in earnest in 1929. In 1930 the Juilliard Foundation of New York engaged pianist and teacher Jacques Jolas to organize a music center in Harrisburg, the core aim of which was forming a symphony orchestra, and rehearsals began that summer. Organizers invited George King Raudenbush, previously of Aeolian Hall in New York, as conductor; he became the orchestra's first music director.

The orchestra gave its first concert at William Penn High School in Harrisburg on March 19, 1931, conducted by Raudenbush.

By the end of 1931 the orchestra had moved its concerts to the newly opened Forum Auditorium in the Education Building, part of the Pennsylvania State Capitol Complex, where it continues to perform.

Raudenbush led the orchestra until 1950. He was succeeded by Edwin McArthur (1950–1974), David Epstein (1974–1978), Larry Newland (1978–1994), Richard Westerfield (1995–1999), and Stuart Malina (2000–present).

In its early decades the orchestra developed educational programs. Young Persons' Concerts for area schoolchildren began in the mid-1930s. From 1937, under an arrangement negotiated by Raudenbush, the Philadelphia Orchestra appeared in the Harrisburg subscription series on a shared-season basis for about twenty years.

A typical recent season includes Masterworks and POPS concert series, Young Persons' Concerts, and educational activities such as in-school performances and master classes by HSO musicians and guest soloists.

In 2006 the orchestra marked its 75th anniversary with a performance of Mahler's Symphony No. 2 on March 19, 75 years to the day after its first concert. The orchestra observed its 90th anniversary during the 2019–2020 season and its 95th anniversary during the 2024–2025 season.

== Music directors ==
- 1931–1950: George King Raudenbush
- 1950–1974: Edwin McArthur
- 1974–1978: David Epstein
- 1978–1994: Larry Newland
- 1995–1999: Richard Westerfield
- 2000–present: Stuart Malina

== Notable soloists ==
Notable soloists who have appeared with the orchestra include pianists Emanuel Ax, Jeffrey Biegel, Sarah Davis Buechner, Claude Frank, Stephen Hough, Eugene Istomin, and Earl Wild; organists Paul Callaway and John Weaver; harpsichordist Igor Kipnis; violinists John Corigliano, Kim Chee-yun, Pamela Frank, Miriam Fried, Joseph Fuchs, Carroll Glenn, Leila Josefowicz, Augustin Hadelich, Erika Morini, Ruggiero Ricci, Gil Shaham, Joseph Szigeti, Efrem Zimbalist, and Pinchas Zukerman; cellists Zuill Bailey, Raya Garbousova, Bernard Greenhouse, Lynn Harrell, Elsa Hilger, Leslie Parnas, and Gregor Piatigorsky; double bassist Gary Karr; and singers Rose Bampton, Roberta Peters, Regina Resnik, and the Trapp Family Singers.

== Harrisburg Symphony Youth Orchestra ==
The Harrisburg Symphony Youth Orchestra (HSYO) was founded in 1953; its first public concert was conducted by Noah Klauss. The program comprises three ensembles: the Harrisburg Symphony Youth Orchestra (high-school age), the Junior Youth String Orchestra (middle-school age), and the Elementary String Orchestra. As of 2026, Gregory Woodbridge, the HSO's associate conductor, is music director of the HSYO.

== Harrisburg Symphony Society ==
The Harrisburg Symphony Society was established in 1990 as the volunteer auxiliary of the Harrisburg Symphony Orchestra. It supports the orchestra through fundraising events, educational programs, and hospitality for the musicians. The society reports having raised approximately $3 million for the orchestra since its founding.

== Volunteers ==
The orchestra is assisted on concert weekends by a volunteer corps whose duties include ticket scanning and seating.
