= Tuscaloosa Symphony Orchestra =

Orchestra based in Tuscaloosa, Alabama (founded 1979)

- Orchestra
- Short name: TSO
- Former name: Tuscaloosa Area Community Orchestra
- Founded: 1979
- Location: Tuscaloosa, Alabama, U.S.
- Concert hall: Moody Concert Hall, University of Alabama
- Music director: Adam Flatt
- Website: tsoonline.org

The Tuscaloosa Symphony Orchestra (TSO) is a professional orchestra based in Tuscaloosa, Alabama. Founded as the Tuscaloosa Area Community Orchestra in 1979, it was reorganized as the Tuscaloosa Symphony Orchestra in 1984. The orchestra performs at the Moody Music Building on the campus of the University of Alabama in Tuscaloosa.

== History ==
The Tuscaloosa Symphony Orchestra was founded in 1979 by Michael Gattozzi and Margaret McCain. Originally named the Tuscaloosa Area Community Orchestra, it was renamed to the Tuscaloosa Symphony Orchestra in 1984. Ransom Wilson served as the orchestra's first professional music director starting in 1985.

In 1988, the orchestra relocated its performances from the Bama Theatre to the Moody Concert Hall at the University of Alabama.

Korean maestro Shin-ik Hahm served as music director from 2001 to 2010, with Adam Flatt taking over in 2011.

== See also ==
- Alabama Symphony Orchestra
- Huntsville Symphony Orchestra
- Mobile Symphony Orchestra
