= Gilmore Artist Award =

American music award

The Gilmore Artist Award is awarded every four years to a concert pianist. The award was established in 1989 by The Gilmore of Kalamazoo, Michigan.

== Selection criteria ==
In contrast with other music awards, nominees are not aware that they are under consideration, but are assessed discreetly over a period of time through live performances and recordings. The prize money is $300,000, of which $50,000 to be spent as the winner desires and $250,000 to be used for career development.

== Previous winners ==
- 1991 – David Owen Norris (England)
- 1994 – Ralf Gothóni (Finland)
- 1998 – Leif Ove Andsnes (Norway)
- 2002 – Piotr Anderszewski (Poland)
- 2006 – Ingrid Fliter (Argentina)
- 2010 – Kirill Gerstein (Russia)
- 2014 – Rafał Blechacz (Poland)
- 2018 – Igor Levit (Russia/Germany)
- 2024 – Alexandre Kantorow (France)

== Gilmore Young Artist Award ==
Every two years, the Gilmore Young Artist Award is presented to promising pianists below age 23. An anonymous selection committee receives and evaluates nominations by music professionals from around the world. As with the Gilmore Artist Award, the nominees are not aware that they are being considered. Awardees receive a $15,000 stipend and another $10,000 to commission an original piano composition that they will have the exclusive right to perform for one year.

The award was first granted in 1991. 38 pianists have received a Gilmore Young Artists Award.

Gilmore Young Artist Award winners
Year	Recipients				
1991	Wendy Chen	Brenda Huang	Peter Miyamoto	Christopher Taylor	
1994	Soojin Ahn	Anders Martinson	Andrea Schneider		
1996	Andrew Armstrong	Katherine K. Lee	Adam Neiman	Orli Shaham	Alex Slobodyanik
1998	Hsing-ay Hsu	Brenda Jones			
2000	Andrew von Oeyen	Orion Weiss			
2002	Jonathan Biss	Kirill Gerstein			
2004	Christopher Falzone	Elizabeth Schumann			
2006	Natasha Paremski	Yuja Wang			
2008	Adam Golka	Rachel Naomi Kudo			
2010	Charlie Albright	Ivan Moshchuk			
2012	George Li	Conrad Tao			
2014	Andrew Hsu	Llewellyn Sanchez-Werner			
2016	Daniel Hsu	Micah McLaurin			
2018	Wei Luo	Elliot Wuu			
2020	Misha Galant	Maxim Lando			
2022	Janice Carissa	Clayton Stephenson			
2024	Kasey Shao	Harmony Zhu			
