= Ivan Moshchuk =

American classical pianist

Ivan Nikolaevich Moshchuk
- Иван Николаевич Мощук
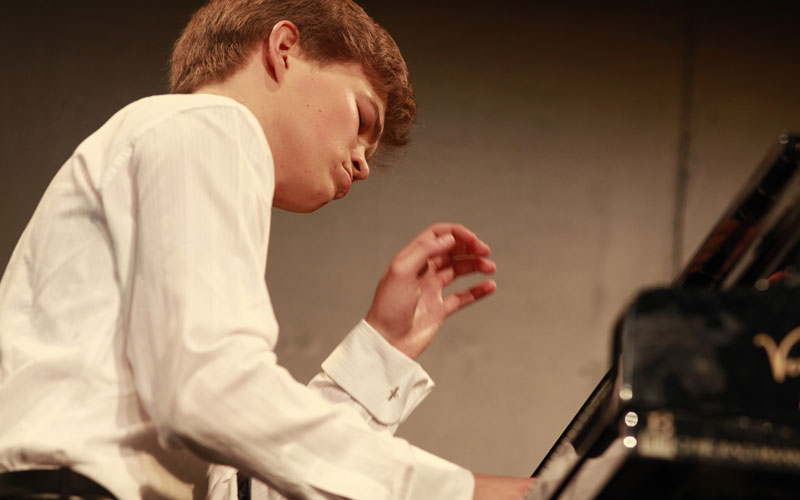
- Moshchuk performing at the Verbier Festival, July 2010.
- Born: December 5, 1990 (age 35); Moscow, Russian SFSR, Soviet Union (present-day Russia)
- Occupation: Pianist

Ivan Nikolaevich Moshchuk (Note: Russian: Иван Николаевич Мощук, romanized: Ivan Nikolayevich Moshchuk) (born December 5, 1990) is a Russian-American classical pianist. He was born in Moscow, U.S.S.R., and raised in Grosse Pointe, Michigan.

== Early life ==
Ivan Nikolaevich Moshchuk was born in Moscow, U.S.S.R., on 5 December 1990. He moved to Metro Detroit at age four with his family after his father accepted an invitation to work at Wayne State University. Soon after, he began taking private lessons with Margarita Molchadskaya, former pedagogue of the central specialized school for gifted children at the Saint Petersburg State Conservatory, named after Nikolai Rimsky-Korsakov.

While still a student at Grosse Pointe South High School, Moshchuk became the first Michigan resident to receive the Gilmore Young Artist Award. He went on to earn a diploma from the Peabody Institute of Johns Hopkins University, where he studied piano performance with Leon Fleisher. Following his studies at the Peabody Institute, Moshchuk relocated to Paris, France, where he became a resident of the Cité internationale des arts.

=== Reception ===
Moshchuk has received positive reviews by the media.

In 2010, Tim Smith of the Baltimore Sun declared that it was "impossible not to be impressed" by Moshchuk's "absorbing, dynamic music-making". The same year the Grand Rapids Press and Lansing City Pulse described Moshchuk's performances as "powerful" and breathtaking. Following his appearance with the South Carolina Philharmonic in 2007, the Columbia Free Times praised Moshchuk for playing the Rachmaninoff Second Concerto with "immense verve and rewarding sonorities," and gave him "only the highest marks for accuracy, musicality, command, technique and sensitivity". The Kalamazoo Gazette noted Moshchuk's "rare combination of breathtaking technique and genuine musicality," selecting his solo recital as part of the Gilmore Rising Stars Series as a favorite of 2011, alongside artists such as Radu Lupu, Yo-Yo Ma, and Anthony McGill. Classical Voice North Carolina described him as "a young artist with matinee good looks and admirable stage presence." Watching a recording of Moshchuk being interviewed for a public radio television program, Great Lakes Chamber Music Festival Artistic Director and pianist James Tocco claimed to have been "struck by how intelligent this young man was" as well as "the power and beauty of his playing.”

In CVNC: An Online Arts Journal in North Carolina, a writer wrote of Moshchuk's all-Chopin performances and compared him to legendary pianist William Kapell:

For this listener, Kapell set the standards for performance of Chopin's Sonata No. 3, and by those standards, all others are perforce measured. I've heard lots of performances of it over the years. Most have disappointed. Moshchuk did not. This performance in Carswell had everything going for it. It was quite simply one of the very best renditions I have heard in over 50 years. And overall, his playing easily made this program among the most impressive I have heard in a lifetime of listening. It was that good."
