= Irving S. Gilmore International Piano Festival =

Irving S. Gilmore International Piano Festival (formerly the Gilmore Keyboard Festival) is an international music festival focused on piano music taking place in Kalamazoo, Michigan. The festival was created in 1989 to highlight keyboard instruments but was renamed from a "keyboard festival to "piano festival" in 2021. The Gilmore also offers commissions to composers for new works for piano. The festival features performances, community events, and educational opportunities like Gilmore Piano Camp.

Among the artists who have performed at the festival are Herbie Hancock, Diana Krall, Tony Bennett, Ben Folds, John Legend, Pink Martini, Emanuel Ax, and Sergei Babayan.

== Awards ==
The Gilmore confers awards including the Gilmore Artist Award, the Gilmore Young Artist Award, and starting in 2022, the Larry J. Bell Jazz Artist Awards.
