= Piotr Anderszewski =

Polish pianist (born 1969)

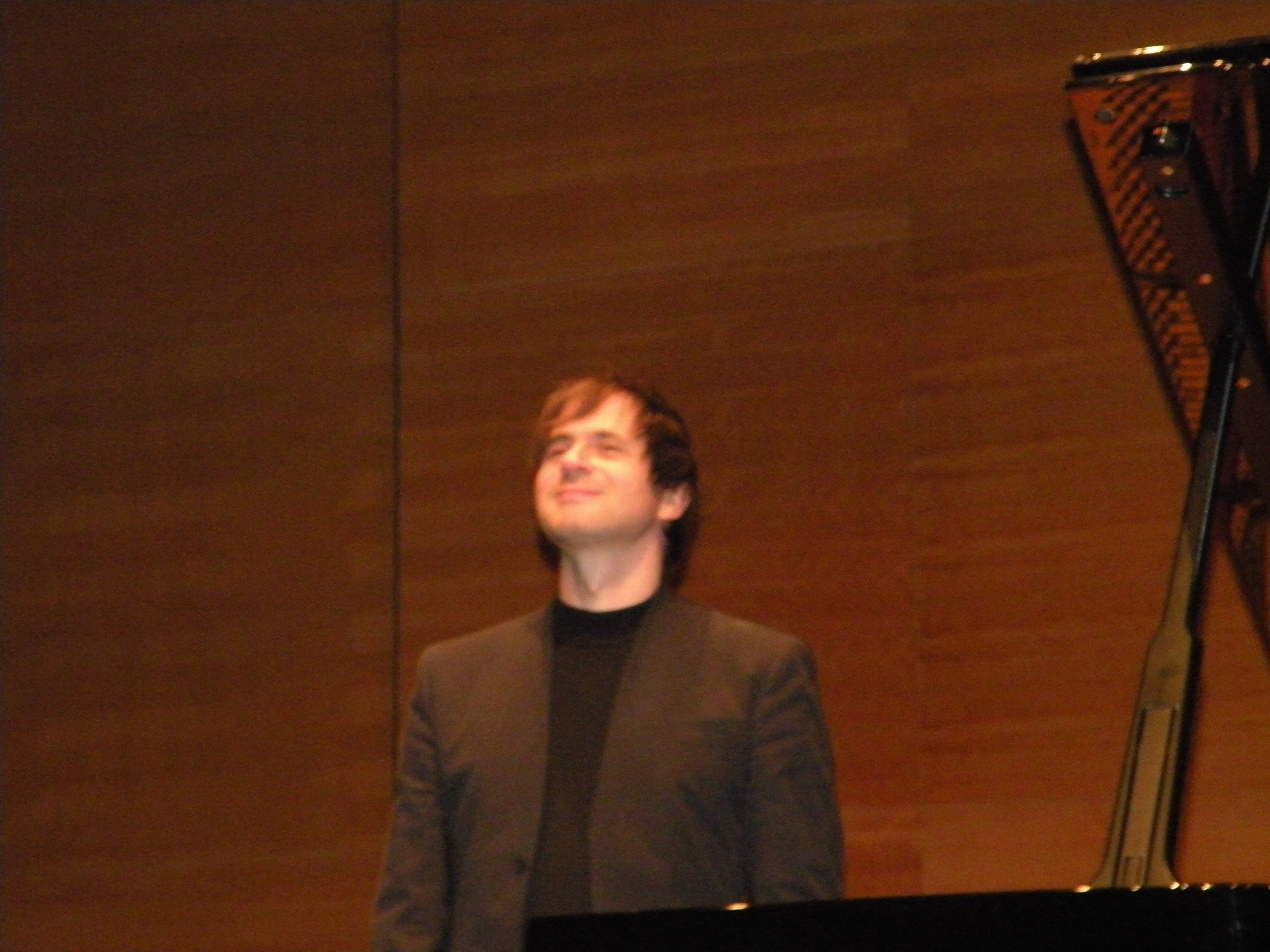
- Anderszewski during La Folle Journée in Nantes, 2009.

Background information
- Born: 4 April 1969 (age 57); Warsaw, Poland
- Genre: Classical
- Occupation: Pianist
- Instrument: Piano
- Years active: 1990-present
- Website: anderszewski.net

Piotr Anderszewski (Polish pronunciation: [ˈpʲɔtr andɛrˈʂɛfski]) (born 4 April 1969) is a Polish pianist. Based in Paris, where he spent part of his childhood, he has enjoyed an international career and has recorded widely, winning several awards.

== Early life and education ==
Anderszewski was born in Warsaw, Poland, to Polish-Hungarian parents. His father's work took the family to France when he was seven and they stayed there for seven years, "I started the piano in France [...] and French became my first language". He studied piano at the Chopin Academy in Warsaw (renamed Fryderyk Chopin University of Music in 2008) and conservatories in Strasbourg (with Hélène Boschi) and Lyon. At age eighteen, he spent a year in the University of Southern California Thornton School of Music in Los Angeles on a scholarship. Later in his twenties, he also studied with Murray Perahia, Fou Ts'ong and Leon Fleisher.

== Career ==
Refusing to enter the Chopin Competition in Warsaw ("...to play only Chopin? I cannot. ...for the Chopin Competition you play only Chopin for four rounds"), Anderszewski first came to public attention at the Leeds Piano Competition in 1990, when he walked off stage in the semi-finals because he felt he had not been playing well enough; the piece was the Variations op. 27 of Anton Webern. He made his London debut six months later at the Wigmore Hall.

He has given recitals at the Royal Festival Hall, Carnegie Hall, Suntory Hall, the Herkulessaal in Munich, the Konzerthaus, Vienna, the Concertgebouw, the Auditorio Nacional de Música in Madrid, the Mariinsky Concert Hall in St. Petersburg and the Walt Disney Concert Hall in Los Angeles. Orchestras with whom Anderszewski has performed include the London Symphony Orchestra, the Berlin Philharmonic, the Philadelphia Orchestra, the Philharmonia Orchestra, the Royal Concertgebouw Orchestra and the Chicago Symphony Orchestra. In addition, Anderszewski has established a significant reputation for directing from the keyboard and has collaborated with chamber orchestras including the Sinfonia Varsovia, the Mahler Chamber Orchestra, the Camerata Salzburg, the Deutsche Kammerphilharmonie in Bremen and the Scottish Chamber Orchestra.

Anderszewski's chamber collaborations have been primarily with violinists - as well as his sister Dorota Anderszewska (currently leader of the Orchestre national de Montpellier Languedoc-Roussillon), he has performed with Viktoria Mullova, Augustin Dumay, Gidon Kremer, Frank Peter Zimmermann and Henning Kraggerud. He also appears regularly with the Belcea Quartet.

Anderszewski made a number of recordings for Harmonia Mundi, Accord and Philips before signing exclusively to Virgin Classics in 2000. His first disc on the Virgin label was Beethoven's Diabelli Variations, which received a number of prizes including a Royal Philharmonic Society award, Choc du Monde de la Musique and an Echo Klassik award. His discography also includes a Gramophone award winning disc of selections from Well-Tempered Clavier Book 2 and a Grammy-nominated CD of Bach's Partitas 1, 3 and 6 and a disc of works by Chopin. His affinity with the music of his compatriot Karol Szymanowski is captured in recording of the composer's solo piano works, which received the Classic FM Gramophone Award in 2006 for best instrumental disc. On 12 April 2012 he received the BBC Music Magazine Recording of the Year Award at a ceremony in London, for his Virgin Classics CD of music of Robert Schumann.

Anderszewski has collaborated on a number of occasions with the filmmaker Bruno Monsaingeon. The first of these collaborations, Piotr Anderszewski plays the Diabelli Variations (2001) explores Anderszewski's particular relationship with Beethoven's opus 120, whilst the second, Piotr Anderszewski, Unquiet Traveller (2008) is an unconventional artist portrait, capturing Anderszewski's reflections on music, performance and his Polish-Hungarian roots. A third film by Monsaingeon, Anderszewski Plays Schumann was completed in 2010. There have also been two filmed recordings of Anderszewski's concert appearances, featuring Mozart piano concertos and a recital given at Warsaw's Philharmonic Hall in 2007.

Anderszewski has received a number of awards throughout his career, including the Gilmore Artist Award (2002), given every four years to a pianist of exceptional talent. He has also been a recipient of the Szymanowski Prize (1999) the Royal Philharmonic Society's Best Instrumentalist award (2001), and the Gramophone Classical Music Award (2021). He has demonstrated an uncompromising attitude to his vocation, criticising the lack of time to prepare a concerto performance with an orchestra, or struggling with unfamiliar pianos in a recital setting.

Anderszewski has championed the work of his compatriot Szymanowski through numerous performances and has directed festivals dedicated to his music at the Théâtre des Bouffes du Nord in Paris (2005), Carnegie Hall, New York (2010), the Wigmore Hall in London (2005 and 2010) and the Philharmonic Hall in Łódź (2010).

== Discography ==
- Leoš Janáček: Sonata for violin and piano. Sergei Prokofiev: Sonata No 1 in F minor, Op 80 for violin and piano. Claude Debussy: Sonata for violin and piano. Viktoria Mullova - violin. Recorded 1994. Philips 446 091. Reissued Philips 457 7460 (2006)
- Johannes Brahms: Sonata No 1 in G, Op 78 for violin and piano. Sonata No 2 in A, Op 100 for violin and piano. Sonata No 3 in D minor, Op 108 for violin and piano. Viktoria Mullova - violin. Recorded 1995. Philips 446 709-2. Reissued Philips 475 7454 (2006)
- Johann Sebastian Bach: English Suite No 6 in D minor, BWV811. Ludwig van Beethoven: Piano Sonata No 31 in A flat major, Op 110. Anton Webern: Variations, Op 27. Recorded 1996. Accord ACD 025. Reissued Virgin Classics 7243 5 45632 2 5 (2004)
- Ludwig van Beethoven: Sonata in G major, Op 30 for violin and piano. Wolfgang Amadeus Mozart: Sonata in E minor, K304 for violin and piano. Franz Schubert: Sonata in A major D574, Op. post. 162 for violin and piano Dorota Anderszewska - violin. Recorded 1998. Accord ACD 044.
- Johann Sebastian Bach: French Suite No 5 in G major, BWV 816. Overture in the French style in B minor, BWV 831. Recorded 1998. Harmonia Mundi HMN 911679
- Ludwig van Beethoven: 33 Variations on a Waltz by Diabelli, Op 120. Recorded 2000. Virgin Classics VC 454682
- Wolfgang Amadeus Mozart: Piano Concerto No 21 in C major, K467. Piano Concerto No 24 in C minor, K491. with the Sinfonia Varsovia. Recorded 2001. Virgin Classics VC 5455042
- Johann Sebastian Bach: Partita No 1 in B flat major, BWV 825. Partita No 3 in A minor, BWV 827. Partita No 6 in E minor, BWV 830. Recorded 2001. Virgin Classics 7243 5 45526 2 5
- Frédéric Chopin: Ballade No 3 in A flat, Op 47. Ballade No 4 in F minor, Op 52. Mazurka in A minor, Op 59 No 1. Mazurka in A flat, Op 59 No 2. Mazurka in F minor, Op 59 No 3. Mazurka in B major, Op 63 No 1. Mazurka in F minor, Op 63 No 2. Mazurka in C sharp minor, Op 63 No 3. Mazurka in F minor, Op 68 No 4. Polonaise No 5 in F sharp minor, Op 44. Polonaise No 6 in A flat, Op 53 'Heroic'. Recorded 2003. Virgin Classics 7243 5 45620 2 0
- Karol Szymanowski: Métopes, Op 29. Masques, Op 34. Piano Sonata No 3, Op 36. Recorded 2004. Virgin Classics 7243 5 45730 2 6
- Wolfgang Amadeus Mozart: Piano Concerto No 17 in G major, K453. Piano Concerto No 20 in D minor, K466. with the Scottish Chamber Orchestra. Recorded 2005. Virgin Classics 0946 344696 2 3
- Wolfgang Amadeus Mozart: Piano Sonata No 16 in C, K545, arr Grieg. with Martha Argerich - piano. Recorded live at the Lugano Festival 2005. EMI 0946 3 58472 2 2
- Ludwig van Beethoven: Piano Concerto No.1 in C major, Op 15, with Die Deutsche Kammerphilharmonie Bremen. Six Bagatelles, Op 126. Recorded 2007. Virgin Classics 50999 5 02111 2 8
- Piotr Anderszewski at Carnegie Hall: J S Bach: Partita No 2 in C minor, BWV 826, Schumann: Faschingsschwank aus Wien, op 26, Janáček: In the Mists (V mlhach) (1912), Beethoven: Sonata No 31 in A flat major, op 110. Bartók: Three Songs from the Csík District, Sz 35a/BB 45b (1907). Recorded 2008. Virgin Classics 2 CDs ICPN: 5099926729121
- Robert Schumann: Humoreske Op. 20, Studien für den Pedalflügel Op.56, Gesänge der Frühe Op. 133. Recorded 2009 & 2010. Virgin Classics Digipack 1 CD 5099994862522
- Johann Sebastian Bach: English Suites Nos 1, 3 and 5. Recorded 2014. Warner Classics CD: 0825646219391; Download: 0825646219377; Mastered for iTunes: 0825646219353
- Johann Sebastian Bach: Well-Tempered Clavier, Book 2 (Excerpts). Recorded 2021. Parlophone Records Limited
