= Music in the Mountains (California) =

Summer classical music festival in Nevada County, California

Music in the Mountains SummerFest has been an annual summer classical music festival in Nevada County, California since 1982. The non-profit organization, Music in the Mountains.org (MIM) holds events throughout the year in a variety of style for all ages. The artistic and music director was Hungarian conductor, Gregory Vajda from 2009 until 2016. Concerts take place in Grass Valley and Nevada City. MIM also sponsors Sierra Brewfest with many local microbreweries.

The California Youth Symphony was expected to do a repeat performance for Music in the Mountains, this time with the 80-plus member chorus in March 2020, but the event was cancelled as a precautionary measure during COVID-19 pandemic in California
