= Brown University Orchestra =

American orchestra

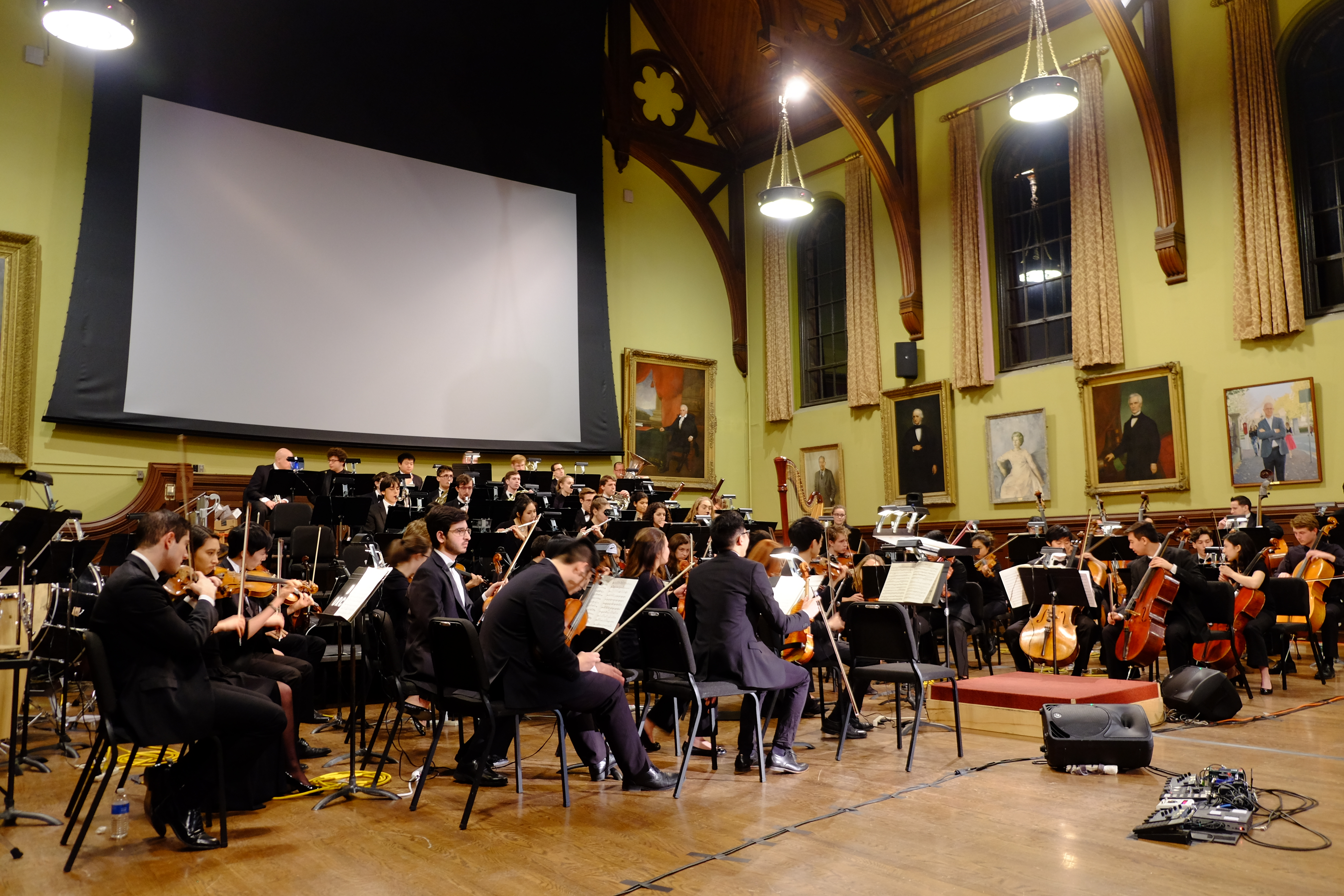
- Formation: 1918; 108 years ago

The Brown University Orchestra (BUO) was founded in 1918 and is composed of approximately 100 members of the Brown University community. It was led by conductor Martin J. Fischer at its inception, until his faculty retirement. Paul Phillips led the orchestra from 1989 until 2017, with Mark Seto currently serving as conductor.

== Performances ==
The Brown University Orchestra has performed twice in Carnegie Hall, the latter concert featuring the Dave Brubeck Quartet; twice with Itzhak Perlman; once in a Providence concert that featured his daughter Navah Perlman '92 as piano soloist; and once in a benefit concert at Avery Fisher Hall. Recent special events include a 2002 tour to Montreal, a 2004 performance of Peter Boyer's multimedia composition Ellis Island: The Dream of America at Veterans Memorial Auditorium in Providence featuring actors Barry Bostwick and Brown alumna Kate Burton, and a 2006-7 tour of China, which made the BUO only the second American college orchestra to tour China. Most recently, the orchestra toured Ireland in 2013, performed with the Paul Taylor Dance Company in 2017, and co-commissioned Tracy Silverman's electric violin concerto Love Song to the Sun in 2018, featuring an interactive multimedia display designed by Brown professor Todd Winkler.

The university has historically performed in Sayles Hall, though it has moved to the Lindemann Performing Arts Center following its completion. The orchestra was a driving force behind the construction of the facility, which opened in 2023.

== Musicians ==
Mstislav Rostropovich, Isaac Stern, Pinchas Zukerman, Eugenia Zukerman and Joseph Kalichstein are among the renowned musicians who have appeared as soloists with the Brown University Orchestra. Composers-in-residence hosted by the orchestra include Steve Reich, Steven Stucky, Michael Torke, Nico Muhly, Lukas Foss, Samuel Adler, Philip Glass, and Joan Tower.

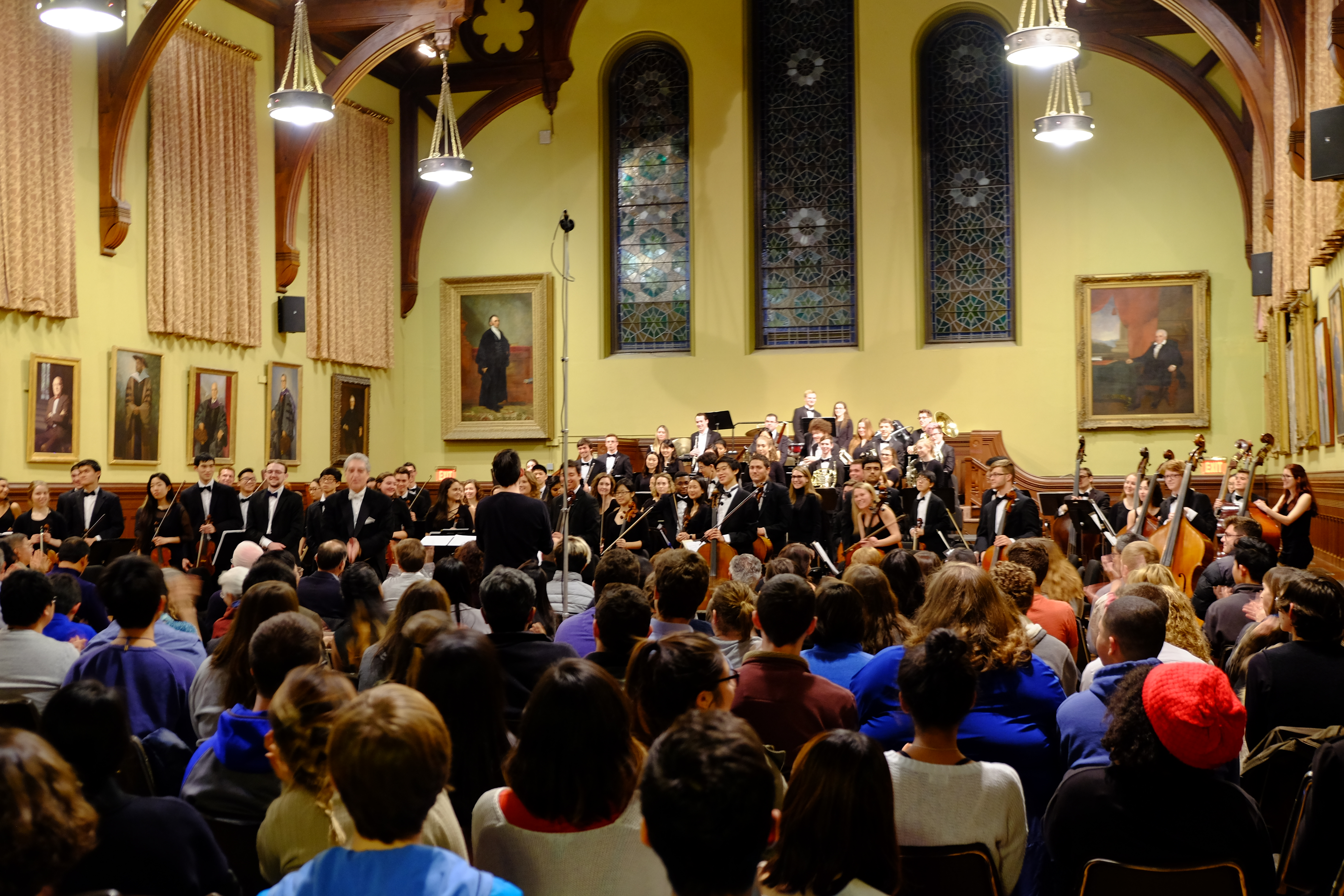
The Brown University Orchestra at Sayles Hall on 2 December 2016.

== Conductors ==
Previous conductors of the orchestra have included Martin J. Fischer, Paul Phillips, and Brandon Keith Brown. In December 2006, Daniel Barenboim served as a guest conductor when he visited with the West-Eastern Divan orchestra. Brown additionally partnered with Barenboim's Barenboim–Said Akademie.

== Awards ==
In 2009, the Brown University Orchestra received the 3rd Prize ASCAP Award for "Adventurous Programming of Contemporary Music" in the Collegiate Orchestra Division. This is the seventh time that the Brown University Orchestra, a member of the American Symphony Orchestra League, has won this prestigious national honor, having received ASCAP Awards previously in 1994, 1997, 1999, 2001, 2004, and 2005.
