= Alabama Symphony Orchestra =

Orchestra in Birmingham, Alabama, founded 1921

- Orchestra
- Founded: 1921
- Concert hall: Alys Stephens Center
- Website: www.alabamasymphony.org

The Alabama Symphony Orchestra is a major orchestra based in Birmingham, Alabama. The orchestra was first formed in April 1921 but had to close because of financial issues in 1993. It re-opened in 1997 after substantial fundraising.

== Programs ==
Since its rebirth in 1997, The Alabama Symphony Orchestra has undertaken an effort to reach every corner of the city and the state with a varied program of music. The ASO now includes 10 subscription series and many special event concerts each season. The ASO also offers a series for school children–Young People's Concerts (YPC). Each season, thousands of students attend YPC concerts. Teachers receive study guides in advance to help prepare students for these concerts and to enhance the educational experience.

On June 29, 2011, the ASO received the John S. Edwards Award for its strong commitment to new American music, demonstrating an enthusiasm for performing the works of living composers. In addition to the concert season in Birmingham, concerts have included Tuscaloosa, Anniston, Decatur, Point Clear, Montgomery (Huntingdon College), Florence, Selma, Dothan and Enterprise. The ASO's association with the Alabama Ballet and Opera Birmingham flourishes as the orchestra accompanies many of their performances. The ASO also planned to collaborate with the Birmingham Civil Rights Institute, Alys Stephens Center, Summerfest Performing Ensemble, and the Birmingham Concert Chorale in concert performances.

== Music Directors ==
- Carlos Izcaray (2015–2026)
- Justin Brown (2006–2012)
- Richard Westerfield (1997–2004) In May 2004, he stepped down from a 6-year tenure as music director of the Alabama Symphony.
- Paul Polivnick (1985–1993)
- Amerigo Marino (1964–1984)
- Arthur Winograd (1960–1964)
- Arthur Bennett Lipkin (1949–1960)
- Dorsey Whittington (1933–1942)

== See also ==
- Huntsville Symphony Orchestra
- Mobile Symphony Orchestra
- Tuscaloosa Symphony Orchestra
