= Hawaii Youth Symphony =

American statewide youth orchestra

Hawaii Youth Symphony (HYS) is a nonprofit, statewide youth orchestra organization based in Honolulu, Hawaii. Founded in 1964, it serves students from across the Hawaiian Islands through orchestral and community music education programs and presents multiple concerts each season.

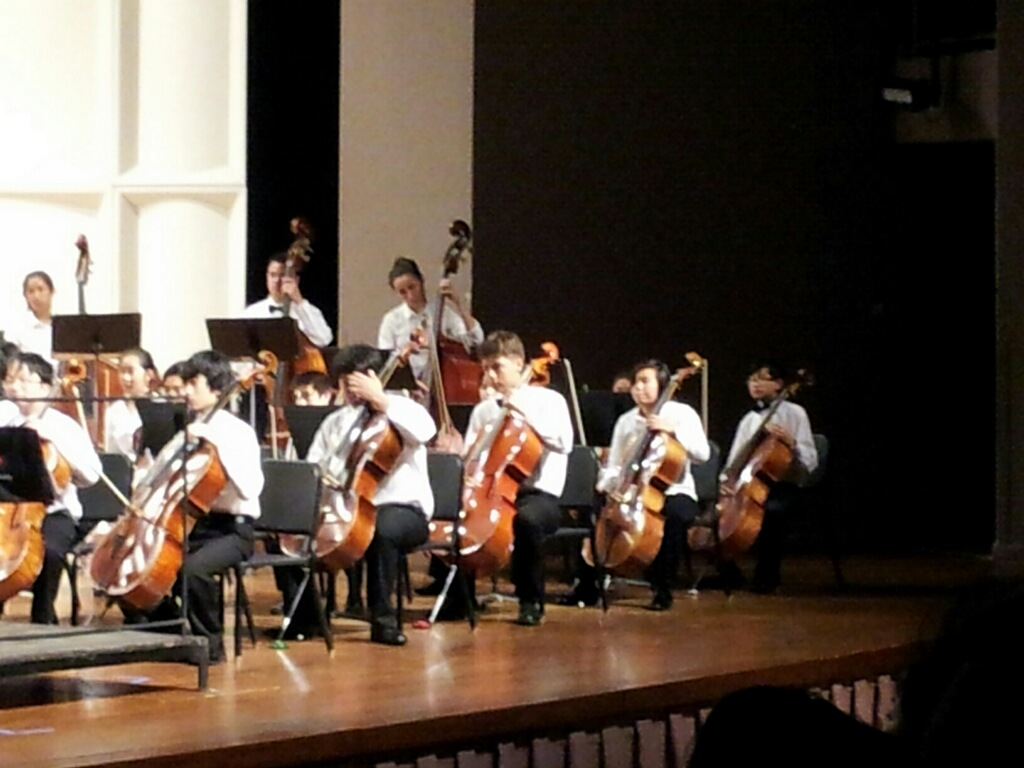
Concert Orchestra cellos and basses in performance

== History ==
HYS was established in 1964 and incorporated as a 501(c)(3) nonprofit; its EIN is 99-0119771. By the late 2000s the organization was drawing participants from multiple islands and staging seasonal concerts in major Honolulu venues. Civil Beat reported in 2016 that the organization worked with youth ages 7–18 and staged about 24 concerts annually.

== Programs ==
HYS organizes its offerings into several program areas that support students at different stages of musical development.

Academy Program

Entry-level and early-stage music instruction focused on fundamentals and ensemble skills. The academy operates in partnership with the Boys & Girls Club of Hawaii.

String Program

Beginning, intermediate, and advanced string orchestras preparing students for full symphonic ensembles.

Symphony Program

The organization's advanced full orchestras — including Youth Symphony I, Youth Symphony II, and Concert Orchestra — rehearse during the academic year and perform a range of orchestral repertoire.

Pacific Music Institute (PMI)

HYS’s summer initiative that brings together students for masterclasses and performances led by faculty and guest artists. Past PMI events have included side-by-side concerts with the Hawaiʻi Symphony Orchestra at the Neal S. Blaisdell Concert Hall.

Music in the Clubhouse (MITCH)

Community access classes run with the Boys & Girls Club of Hawaii, providing entry-level instrumental instruction and instrument loans.

== Leadership ==
Henry Miyamura served as music director of Hawaii Youth Symphony for many years and conducted Youth Symphony I during his tenure.

Youth Symphony II is conducted by Susan Ochi-Onishi.

Former conductors of Youth Symphony II include Derrick Yamane.

Since 2012, the organization's chief executive has been Randy Wong; nonprofit filings list him as President / CEO.

== Performances and partnerships ==
HYS ensembles perform concerts throughout the academic year, often collaborating with professional artists and organizations. The program has partnered with the Hawaiʻi Symphony Orchestra for joint performances in the Blaisdell Concert Hall and has presented statewide performances including free community concerts at the Maui Arts & Cultural Center.

== Recordings and recognition ==
In 2013, HYS released the concert album He Makana O Nā Mele (The Gift of Music); the recording was a finalist for a Nā Hōkū Hanohano Award in 2014.

== See also ==
- Hawaiʻi Symphony Orchestra
- Music of Hawaii
