= Mobile Symphony Orchestra =

Orchestra in Mobile, Alabama (founded 1970)

- Orchestra
- Founded: 1997
- Location: Mobile, Alabama, U.S.
- Concert hall: Saenger Theatre
- Music director: Scott Speck
- Website: mobilesymphony.org

The Mobile Symphony Orchestra is the symphonic orchestra of Mobile, Alabama. Scott Speck is the current music director.

== Concerts ==
The Mobile Symphony Orchestra holds a seven-concert season from September to May of each year, consisting of six traditional classical concerts and one holiday concert. Annual traditions include Beethoven and Blue Jeans in November and Holiday in December. The orchestra has performed repertoire from many musical styles and periods and has hosted many artists, including Yo-Yo Ma and Renée Fleming.

== History ==
The origin of the Mobile Symphony Orchestra dates back to 1970, with the establishment of Symphony Concerts of Mobile. In 1996, the organization's board began planning the development of a full-time professional orchestra to permanently reside in Mobile. In 1997, the name of the company was changed to Mobile Symphony, Inc., and in 1998 the orchestra held its first concert season. The symphony's first and current music director, Scott Speck, was named in 2000. In 2002, under the leadership of mayor Michael Dow, the company acquired a building at 257 Dauphin Street in downtown Mobile, which became the Larkins Music Center. The building includes office space, a large recital hall, practice rooms, meeting facilities, and a landscaped courtyard. The building also has a connection to the historic Saenger Theatre, where the orchestra performs all concerts.

== See also ==
- Alabama Symphony Orchestra
