= Charles Ives Prize =

Scholarship for young composers

The Charles Ives Awards are scholarships for young composers, awarded annually by the American Academy of Arts and Letters: six scholarships of $7,500, and two fellowships of $15,000. In 1998, the Academy inaugurated the Charles Ives Living, a 2-year, $200,000 award, and in 2008 awarded the inaugural Charles Ives Opera Prize of $50,000.

== Winners ==
Year	Winner	Award
1970	Joseph C. Schwantner	
1970	John Kirkpatrick	
1971	Louis Smith Weingarden	
1971	Vivian Perlis	
1972	Michael Seyfrit	
1972	Robert J. Krupnick	
1972	Thomas Janson	
1972	Harold Farberman	
1973	Peter Lieberson	
1973	Robert Gerster	
1973	Charles Ives Society	
1973	Philip Caldwell Carlsen	
1974	Ira Taxin	
1974	Allen Shearer	
1974	Paul Alan Levi	
1975	Yale University Music Library	
1975	David Koblitz	
1975	Stephen Chatman	
1975	Chester Biscardi	
1976	Bruce Saylor	
1976	William Matthews	
1976	Robert E. Martin	
1976	Tod Machover	
1976	Joseph A. Hudson	
1976	Michael Eckert	
1977	Maurice Wright	
1977	John Anthony Lennon	
1977	Matthias Kriesberg	
1977	John Halvor Benson	
1977	Larry Thomas Bell	
1977	Gregory Ballard	
1978	David Olan	
1978	Thomas Mountain	
1978	Arthur W. Gottschalk	
1978	Lee Scott Goldstein	
1978	Justin Dello Joio	
1978	Daniel Brewbaker	
1979	Tobias Picker	
1979	David B. Goodman	
1979	Carl Brenner	
1979	Marilyn S. Bliss	
1979	Susan Blaustein	
1979	Robert Beaser	
1980	George Tsontakis	
1980	Mario J. Pelusi	
1980	William Maiben	
1980	Lowell Lieberman	
1980	Laura Clayton	
1980	Thomas E. Barker	
1981	Daniel C. Warner	
1981	Russell F. Pinkston	
1981	William Neil	
1981	Thomas Allen LeVines	
1981	Allen Gimbel	
1981	Tamar Diesendruck	
1982	Karen P. Thomas	
1982	Preston Stahly, Jr.	
1982	Charles E. Porter	
1982	Jeffrey Hall	
1982	Peter Golub	
1983	John T. Sackett	
1983	Daron Aric Hagen	
1983	David Froom	
1983	Richard Danielpour	Charles Ives Fellowship
1984	Gregory Youtz	
1984	Nicholas C.K. Thorne	Charles Ives Fellowship
1984	Larry Stukenholtz	
1984	Bright Sheng	
1984	Laura Karpman	
1984	Kenneth Fuchs	
1984	Richard Campanelli	
1985	Michael Torke	
1985	Robert Steven Rouse	
1985	James Primosch	
1985	Thomas Oboe Lee	Charles Ives Fellowship
1985	Paul D. Kozel	
1985	Glen Cortese	
1985	William E. Coble	
1986	Frank Ticheli	
1986	Vincent Paul Moravec	
1986	Martin M. Matalon	
1986	James Legg	
1986	Robert Kyr	
1986	Eric David Chasalow	Charles Ives Fellowship
1987	Randall Woolf	
1987	Russell F. Pinkston	Charles Ives Fellowship
1987	Gary Philo	
1987	Christopher Lewis James	
1987	David Karl Gompper	
1987	Sebastian Currier	
1987	Mark Barenboim	
1988	David J. Vayo	
1988	Douglas A. Scott	
1988	Behzad Ranjbaran	
1988	Gerald H. Plain	Charles Ives Fellowship
1988	Mark Kilstofte	
1988	Timothy Geller	
1988	Richard Argosh	
1989	Carolyn Yarnell	
1989	Augusta Read Thomas	
1989	Suzanne Sheppard	
1989	Michael Ruszczynski	
1989	John P. Russo	
1989	Mark D. Johnson	
1989	Susan Harding	Charles Ives Fellowship
1990	William Waite	
1990	Russell Platt	
1990	Troy Peters	
1990	Corinne Nordmann	
1990	Lowell Liebermann	Charles Ives Fellowship
1990	John Kennedy	
1990	Jonathan Dawe	
1991	Julia Wolfe	
1991	Eric S. Sessler	
1991	Justin Davidson	
1991	Nathan Currier	Charles Ives Fellowship
1991	John V. Costa	
1991	Edmund Campion	
1991	Kendall Durelle Briggs	
1992	Geoffrey Stanton	Charles Ives Fellowship
1992	Andrew Rindfleisch	
1992	Kevin Puts	
1992	Mark Kuss	
1992	Jennifer Higdon	
1992	John Gibson	
1992	Evan Chambers	
1993	Laura Schwendinger	
1993	Anthony Kelley	
1993	Leslie Hogan	
1993	Lee Gannon	
1993	Sebastian Currier	
1993	Gia Comolli	
1993	Marco Beltrami	
1994	Jason N. Uechi	
1994	Augusta Read Thomas	Charles Ives Fellowship
1994	Eric Sawyer	
1994	Erik Santos	
1994	John Halle	
1994	Miguel B. Chuaqui	
1995	Daniel Worley	
1995	Dalit Warshaw	
1995	Chris Theofanidis	Charles Ives Fellowship
1995	Pawel Sydor	
1995	Daniel Ott	
1995	Dan Coleman	
1995	Carlos Carrillo	
1996	David Taddie	
1996	Luis Prado	
1996	Pablo Ortiz	Charles Ives Fellowship
1996	Richard Danielpour	Charles Ives Fellowship
1996	Michael Nathaniel Hersch	
1996	Renee Favand	
1996	Kevin Beavers	
1996	Richard Adams	
1996	Dr. Carol Williams	
1997	Barbara A. White	
1997	Andrew Kirshner	
1997	Daniel Kellogg	
1997	Deniz Ince	
1997	Jennifer Higdon	Charles Ives Fellowship
1997	Mason Bates	
1998	David Sanford	
1998	Helen Lee	
1998	Alexander H. Freeman	
1998	Dorothy Chang	
1998	Robert B. Carl	Charles Ives Fellowship
1998	Christopher L. Brown	
1998	Martin Bresnick	
1999	Robert Zimmerman	
1999	Jason Roth	
1999	David Mallamud	
1999	Paul Yeon Lee	
1999	Roshanne Etezady	
1999	Steven Burke	Charles Ives Fellowship
2000	Gregory T. S. Walker	Charles Ives Fellowship
2000	Carlos Sanchez-Gutierrez	Charles Ives Fellowship
2000	Laurie San Martin	Charles Ives Scholarship
2000	Marcus Maroney	Charles Ives Scholarship
2000	John Kaefer	Charles Ives Scholarship
2000	Sara Doncaster	Charles Ives Scholarship
2000	Christina Ahn	Charles Ives Scholarship
2001	Chen Yi	Charles Ives Living
2001	Erik Santos	Charles Ives Fellowship
2001	Russell Platt	Charles Ives Fellowship
2001	Sally Lamb	Charles Ives Fellowship
2001	Tom Swafford	Charles Ives Scholarship
2001	Jonathan Newman	Charles Ives Scholarship
2001	Hubert Ho	Charles Ives Scholarship
2001	Gabriela Frank	Charles Ives Scholarship
2001	Michael Djupstrom	Charles Ives Scholarship
2001	James Barry	Charles Ives Scholarship
2002	Leslie Hogan	Charles Ives Fellowship
2002	Mason Bates	Charles Ives Fellowship
2002	Dmitri Tymoczko	Charles Ives Scholarship
2002	Gregory Spears	Charles Ives Scholarship
2002	David Schober	Charles Ives Scholarship
2002	Nathan Michel	Charles Ives Scholarship
2002	Nancy Kho	Charles Ives Scholarship
2002	Kati Agocs	Charles Ives Scholarship
2003	Barbara White	Charles Ives Fellowship
2003	Daniel Kellogg	Charles Ives Fellowship
2003	Melissa Mazzoli	Charles Ives Scholarship
2003	Keeril Makan	Charles Ives Scholarship
2003	David T. Little	Charles Ives Scholarship
2003	James Lee, III	Charles Ives Scholarship
2003	Jorge Villavicencio Grossmann	Charles Ives Scholarship
2003	Anthony Cheung	Charles Ives Scholarship
2004	Stephen Hartke	Charles Ives Living
2004	Harold Meltzer	Charles Ives Fellowship
2004	Kristin P. Kuster	Charles Ives Fellowship
2004	Aaron J. Travers	Charles Ives Scholarship
2004	Jeff Myers	Charles Ives Scholarship
2004	Tamar Muskal	Charles Ives Scholarship
2004	Judd Greenstein	Charles Ives Scholarship
2004	Judah Adashi	Charles Ives Scholarship
2005	Edward Jacobs	Charles Ives Fellowship
2005	Kurt Rohde	Charles Ives Fellowship
2005	Matthew Tommasini	Charles Ives Scholarship
2005	Sean Shepherd	Charles Ives Scholarship
2005	Manly Romero	Charles Ives Scholarship
2005	Shawn Hundley	Charles Ives Scholarship
2005	Ryan Anthony Francis	Charles Ives Scholarship
2005	Aaron Einbond	Charles Ives Scholarship
2006	Yevgeniy Sharlat	Charles Ives Fellowship
2006	Anthony Cheung	Charles Ives Fellowship
2006	Justin Messina	Charles Ives Scholarship
2006	Robinson McClellan	Charles Ives Scholarship
2006	Steven Hoey	Charles Ives Scholarship
2006	Shawn Crouch	Charles Ives Scholarship
2007	George Tsontakis	Charles Ives Living
2007	Aleksandra Vrebalov	Charles Ives Fellowship
2007	Arlene Elizabeth Sierra	Charles Ives Fellowship
2007	Orianna Webb	Charles Ives Scholarship
2007	Zachary R. Wadsworth	Charles Ives Scholarship
2007	Jay Wadley	Charles Ives Scholarship
2007	Dan Visconti	Charles Ives Scholarship
2007	Trevor Gureckis	Charles Ives Scholarship
2007	David Fulmer	Charles Ives Scholarship
2008	Stephen Hartke	Charles Ives Opera Prize
2008	Kay Rhie	Charles Ives Fellowship
2008	Kati Agócs	Charles Ives Fellowship
2008	Kate Soper	Charles Ives Scholarship
2008	John Christian Orfe	Charles Ives Scholarship
2008	Andrew McPherson	Charles Ives Scholarship
2008	Ted Hearne	Charles Ives Scholarship
2008	Jacob Bancks	Charles Ives Scholarship
2008	Timo Andres	Charles Ives Scholarship
2009	Ray Lustig	Charles Ives Fellowship
2009	Yu-Hui Chang	Charles Ives Fellowship
2009	Carolyn O'Brien	Charles Ives Scholarship
2009	Andrew Norman	Charles Ives Scholarship
2009	David M. Gordon	Charles Ives Scholarship
2009	Michael Gilbertson	Charles Ives Scholarship
2009	Ryan Gallagher	Charles Ives Scholarship
2009	Matthew Barnson	Charles Ives Scholarship
2010	Michael Djupstrom	Charles Ives Fellowship
2010	Anna Clyne	Charles Ives Fellowship
2010	Roger Zare	Charles Ives Scholarship
2010	Jude Vaclavik	Charles Ives Scholarship
2010	Clint Needham	Charles Ives Scholarship
2010	Eric Nathan	Charles Ives Scholarship
2010	Jesse Benjamin Jones	Charles Ives Scholarship
2010	Shawn Allison]	Charles Ives Scholarship
2011	Jay Wadley	Charles Ives Fellowship
2011	Dan Visconti	Charles Ives Fellowship
2011	Alex Mincek	Charles Ives Scholarship
2011	Bryan Jacobs	Charles Ives Scholarship
2011	Louis Chiappetta	Charles Ives Scholarship
2011	Christopher Cerrone	Charles Ives Scholarship
2012	Xi Wang	Charles Ives Fellowship
2012	Haralabos [Harry] Stafylakis	Charles Ives Fellowship
2012	Christopher Theofanidis	Charles Ives Fellowship
2012	Chris Rogerson	Charles Ives Scholarship
2012	James Matheson	Charles Ives Scholarship
2012	Wang Jie	Charles Ives Scholarship
2012	Takuma Itoh	Charles Ives Scholarship
2012	David Hertzberg	Charles Ives Scholarship
2012	Sean Friar	Charles Ives Scholarship
2012	Niccolo Athens	Charles Ives Scholarship
2013	Ted Hearne	Charles Ives Fellowship
2013	David Fulmer	Charles Ives Fellowship
2013	Elizabeth Ogonek	Charles Ives Scholarship
2013	Michael Lee	Charles Ives Scholarship
2013	Tonia Ko	Charles Ives Scholarship
2013	Patrick Harlin	Charles Ives Scholarship
2013	Stephen Feigenbaum	Charles Ives Scholarship
2013	Joshua Cody	Charles Ives Scholarship
2014	Dan Tepfer	Charles Ives Fellowship
2014	Nathan Shields	Charles Ives Fellowship
2014	Nina C. Young	Charles Ives Scholarship
2014	Daniel Schlosberg	Charles Ives Scholarship
2014	Jeremy Podgursky	Charles Ives Scholarship
2014	Balint Karosi	Charles Ives Scholarship
2014	David Kirkland Garner	Charles Ives Scholarship
2014	William David Cooper	Charles Ives Scholarship
2015	Erin Gee	Charles Ives Fellowship
2015	Jason Eckardt	Charles Ives Fellowship
2015	Christopher Trapani	Charles Ives Scholarship
2015	Polina Nazaykinskaya	Charles Ives Scholarship
2015	Max Grafe	Charles Ives Scholarship
2015	Paul Frucht	Charles Ives Scholarship
2015	Emily Cooley	Charles Ives Scholarship
2015	Julia Adolphe	Charles Ives Scholarship
2016	Hannah Lash	Charles Ives Fellowship
2016	Eric Wubbels	Charles Ives Fellowship
2016	Liliya Ugay	Charles Ives Scholarship
2016	Sonnet Swire	Charles Ives Scholarship
2016	Jeffrey Parola	Charles Ives Scholarship
2016	Dylan Mattingly	Charles Ives Scholarship
2016	Scott Lee	Charles Ives Scholarship
2016	Thomas Kotcheff	Charles Ives Scholarship
2017	Ryan Chase	Charles Ives Fellowship
2017	Saad Haddad	Charles Ives Fellowship
2017	Sid Richardson	Charles Ives Scholarship
2017	Hilary Purrington	Charles Ives Scholarship
2017	Sky Macklay	Charles Ives Scholarship
2017	William Healy	Charles Ives Scholarship
2018	Peter Van Zandt Lane	Charles Ives Fellowship
2018	Matthew Schreibeis	Charles Ives Fellowship
2018	Peter S. Shin	Charles Ives Scholarship
2018	Sunbin Kim	Charles Ives Scholarship
2018	Eli Greenhoe	Charles Ives Scholarship
2018	Jack Frerer	Charles Ives Scholarship
2018	Jonathan Cziner	Charles Ives Scholarship
2018	Theo Chandler	Charles Ives Scholarship
2019	Christopher Cerrone	Charles Ives Fellowship
2019	Reinaldo Moya	Charles Ives Fellowship
2019	Miles Walter	Charles Ives Scholarship
2019	Marco-Adrian Ramos Rodriguez	Charles Ives Scholarship
2019	Paul Mortilla	Charles Ives Scholarship
2019	Sato Matsui	Charles Ives Scholarship
2020	Matthew Ricketts	Charles Ives Fellowship
2020	Timo Andres	Charles Ives Fellowship
2020	Jason Mulligan	Charles Ives Scholarship
2020	David Clay Mettens	Charles Ives Scholarship
2020	Nate May	Charles Ives Scholarship
2020	Huijuan Ling	Charles Ives Scholarship
2020	Aaron Israel Levin	Charles Ives Scholarship
2021	Gabriel Kahane	Charles Ives Fellowship
2021	Narong Prangcharoen	Charles Ives Fellowship
2021	William Dougherty	Charles Ives Scholarship
2021	Alexis Lamb	Charles Ives Scholarship
2021	Ehud Perlman	Charles Ives Scholarship
2021	Frances Pollock	Charles Ives Scholarship
2021	Joel Thompson	Charles Ives Scholarship
2021	Shelley Washington	Charles Ives Scholarship
2022	Leila Adu-Gilmore	Charles Ives Fellowship
2022	Sungji Hong	Charles Ives Fellowship
2022	Brittany Green	Charles Ives Scholarship
2022	Marco Jimenez	Charles Ives Scholarship
2022	Paul Novak	Charles Ives Scholarship
2022	Nicole Russell	Charles Ives Scholarship
2022	Michael Seltenreich	Charles Ives Scholarship
2022	Kari Watson	Charles Ives Scholarship
2023	Charles Peck	Charles Ives Fellowship
2023	Peter Shin	Charles Ives Fellowship
2023	Seare Farhat	Charles Ives Scholarship
2023	Jordyn Gallinek	Charles Ives Scholarship
2023	Luke Haaksma	Charles Ives Scholarship
2023	Ali Can Puskulcu	Charles Ives Scholarship
2023	Harriet Steinke	Charles Ives Scholarship
2023	Bethany Younge	Charles Ives Scholarship
2024	Fang Man	Charles Ives Fellowship
2024	Susie Ibarra	Charles Ives Fellowship
2024	Elise Arancio	Charles Ives Scholarship
2024	Jacob Beranek	Charles Ives Scholarship
2024	Luke Blackburn	Charles Ives Scholarship
2024	Liam Cummins	Charles Ives Scholarship
2024	Isaac Santos	Charles Ives Scholarship
2024	Justin Weiss	Charles Ives Scholarship
2024	Sean Shepherd	Charles Ives Living
2025	Arseniy Gusev	Charles Ives Fellowship
2025	Gabriella Smith	Charles Ives Fellowship
2025	Corey Chang	Charles Ives Scholarship
2025	Ryan William Garvey	Charles Ives Scholarship
2025	Baldwin Giang	Charles Ives Scholarship
2025	Emily Liushen	Charles Ives Scholarship
2025	Gabriel Novak	Charles Ives Scholarship
2025	Max Vinetz	Charles Ives Scholarship
