= Pierrot ensemble =

Type of musical ensemble

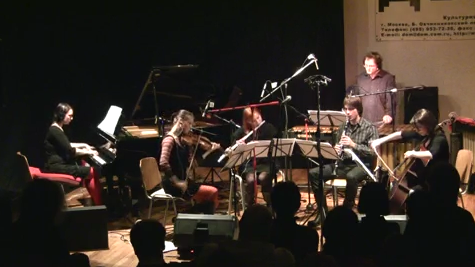
Pierrot ensemble plus percussion (vibraphone) in a performance of Steve Reich's Double Sextet.

A Pierrot ensemble is a musical ensemble comprising flute, clarinet, violin, cello and piano. This ensemble is named after 20th-century composer Arnold Schoenberg’s seminal work Pierrot lunaire, which includes the quintet of instruments above with a narrator (usually performed by a soprano).

== History ==
The quintet of instruments used in Pierrot Lunaire has been used in the twentieth century by different groups, such as The Fires of London, who formed in 1965 as "The Pierrot Players" to perform Pierrot lunaire, and continued to concertize with a varied classical and contemporary repertory. This group began to perform works arranged for these instruments and commission new works.

While standard chamber ensembles (such as string quartets or piano trios) continued to be extremely popular among 20th-century composers, the Pierrot ensemble represents an example of the many kinds of non-standard chamber ensembles that have been used in classical music since the beginning of the 20th century.

The number of compositions written for Pierrot Ensemble is limited by the inherent unbalance of the ensemble (two strings, plus two winds, plus piano). More frequent are works that introduce additional instruments, typically more strings, and especially percussion which obtains a small, and inexpensive, chamber ensemble with three families of instruments represented.

== Doublings ==
Doublings are a standard compositional device used to extend an ensemble instrumental color. In Schoenberg's Pierrot lunaire, the flutist is asked to play piccolo, the clarinetist is asked to play bass clarinet. Other common doublings might include E♭ clarinet (as in Carter's Triple Duo), alto flute.

== Notable Pierrot ensembles ==
- The Fires of London (founded as the Pierrot Players) (1965–1987, UK)
- Da Capo Chamber Players (1970, USA)
- The New Music Players (1990, UK)
- Standing Wave (1991, Canada)
- Eighth Blackbird (Pierrot + percussion) (1996, USA)
- Achrome Ensemble (2013, Italy)
- Brightwork New Music (2013, USA)
- What Is Noise (2014, USA)
- Ensemble Namu 나무앙상블 (2017, South Korea)

== Works for Pierrot ensemble ==
- Arnold Schoenberg: Pierrot lunaire (1912) + voice (usually soprano)
  - The originary work after which the ensemble is named.
- Amaury du Closel: Stolpersteine (2021)
- John Harbison:
  - Die Kürze (1970)
  - Chaconne (2001)
- Milton Babbitt: Arie da Capo (1979)
- Richard Festinger: Ontogenesis (1978)
- Michael Finnissy: Banumbirr (1982)
- Ellen Taaffe Zwilich: Intrada (1983)
- Gérard Grisey: Taléa (1986)
- Zhou Long: Dhyana (1989)
- Steven Mackey: Indigenous Instruments (1989)
- Gunther Schuller: Paradigm Exchanges (1991)
- Jorge Villavicencio Grossmann:
  - Siray I (1995)
  - Siray III (2018)
- Michael Torke: Telephone Book (1995) {comprising Yellow Pages (1985), Blue Pages (1995), and White Pages (1995)}
- Dorothy Hindman: Setting Century (1999)
- David Lang: Sweet Air (1999)
- Carolyn Yarnell: Lapis Lazuli (2007)
- Jean-Louis Agobet: Eclisses (2008)
- Fabien Levy: A propos (2008)
- Greg Caffrey: These are the Clouds about the fallen sun (2013)
- Armando Bayolo: Gestos inútiles (2013)
- Caio Facó: Sopros do Estuário (2017)
- Christopher Healey: Gardens of my Heart (2018)
- Basil Considine: On the Sweet Shores of Napoli (2021)
- Basil Considine: ...So Wrong (2023)
- Lior Navok: Quicksand (2023)
- Axel Reyes: "Bokeh Boreal" (2026)

== Works with alternative/additional instruments ==
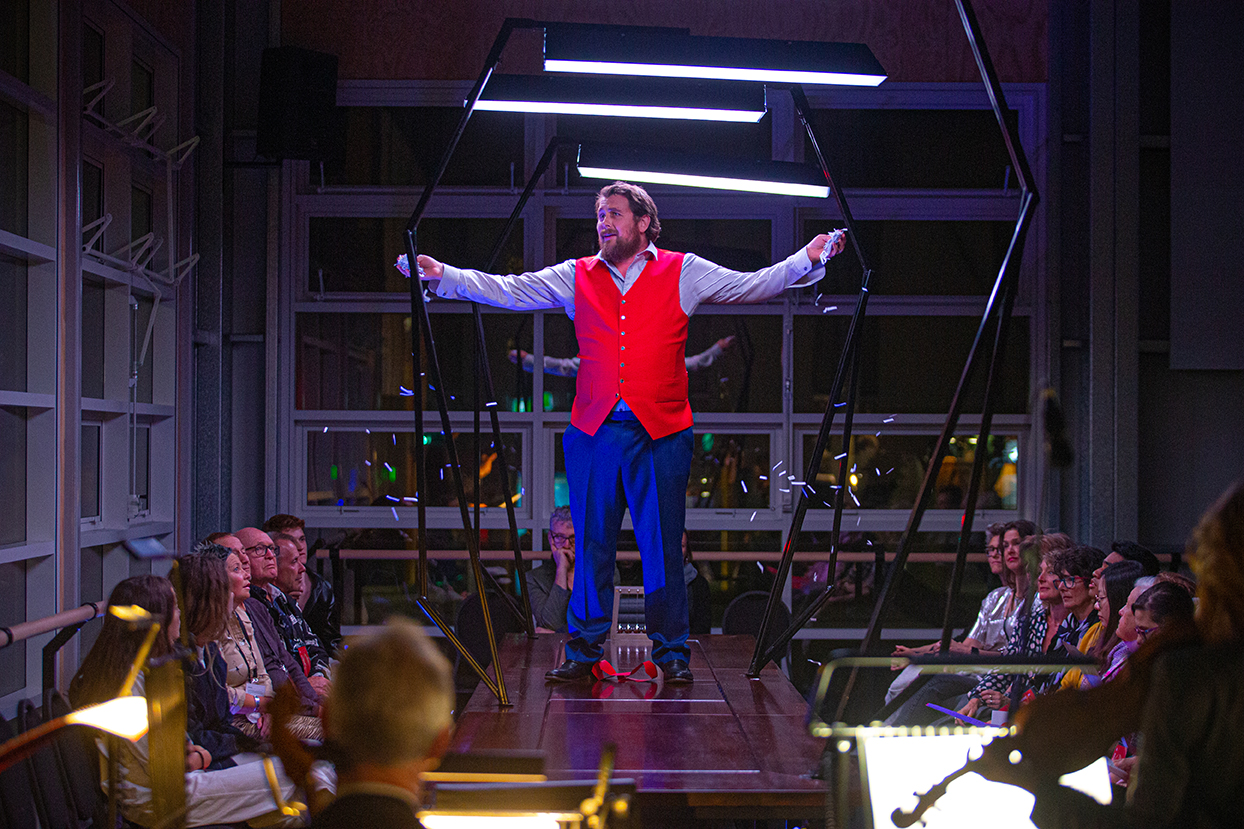
Peter Maxwell Davies' Eight Songs for a Mad King, in a 2020 New Zealand Opera production

- Maurice Ravel: 3 Poèmes de Stéphane Mallarmé (1913) + 2nd flute, 2nd clarinet, and voice
- Igor Stravinsky: 3 Japanese Lyrics (1913) + 2nd flute doubling piccolo, 2nd clarinet, and voice
- Manuel de Falla: Harpsichord Concerto (1926) + oboe, harpsichord instead of piano
- Hanns Eisler:
  - Palmström (1926) + soprano (without piano)
  - 14 Arten den Regen zu beschreiben (1941) + viola
- Olivier Messiaen: Quatuor pour la fin du temps (1941) (without flute)
- Juan Carlos Paz: Dedalus (1950)
- Peter Maxwell Davies: Eight Songs for a Mad King (1969) + baritone and percussion
- Sean Friar: Scale 9 (2009) + percussion - flute (quintet), + percussion (sextet), + viola, and percussion (septet)
- Donald Martino: Notturno (1973) + percussion; winner of the 1974 Pulitzer Prize
- Morton Feldman: For Frank O'Hara (1976) + percussion
- Ralph Shapey: Three for Six (1979) + percussion
- Joan Tower: Noon Dance (1982) + percussion
- Charles Wuorinen: New York Notes (1982) + 1 or 2 percussionists and electronic sounds
- Elliott Carter: Triple Duo (1983) + percussion
- Richard Festinger:
  - Septet (1987) + viola and percussion
  - A Serenade for Six (1993) + percussion
  - After Blue (1998) + percussion
  - The Coming of Age (2003) + soprano and viola
- Salvatore Sciarrino: Lo Spazio inverso (1985) + celesta
- John Harbison: The Natural World (1987) + soprano
- William Susman:
  - Twisted Figures (1987) + mallet percussion
  - Camille (2010) with piano four-hands
- John Cage: Seven (1988) + viola
- Kamran Ince: Waves of Talya (1989) + percussion
- Earle Brown: Tracking Pierrot (1992) + percussion
- Jacob Druckman: Come Round (1992) + percussion
- Laura Schwendinger:
  - Fable (1992) + percussion
  - Songs of Heaven and Earth (1997) + percussion, harp and voice
  - Mise-en-scene (2011) + percussion
  - Artist's Muse (2017) + percussion
- Chen Yi: Sparkle (1992) + 2 percussionists, double bass
- Iannis Xenakis: Plektó (1993) + percussion
- Mario Davidovsky: Flashbacks (1995) + percussion
- Gérard Grisey: Vortex Temporum (1996) + viola
- Robert Paterson:
  - Quintus (1996) + percussion (without flute)
  - Sextet (1999) + percussion
  - The Thin Ice of Your Fragile Mind (2004) + percussion
  - Eating Variations (2006) + baritone and percussion (without piano)
  - Winter Songs (2008) + bass-baritone and percussion
  - Hell's Kitchen (2014) + percussion
  - Summer Songs (2016) + soprano and percussion
  - Spring Songs (2018) + tenor and percussion
  - Autumn Songs (2019) + mezzo-soprano and percussion
  - Listen (2022) + choir and percussion
- Mel Powell: Sextet (1996) + percussion
- Lior Navok
  - Sextet (1998) + percussion
  - Elegy to the Future (2001) + percussion
- Steven Stucky: Ad Parnassum (1998) + percussion
- Steven Mackey: Micro-Concerto (1999) + percussion
- Louis Andriessen: Zilver (1994) + percussion
- Fred Lerdahl: Time After Time (2000) + percussion
- Rytis Mazulis: Canon mensurabilis (2000) + viola
- Tristan Murail: Winter Fragments (2000) + electronic sounds
- Frederic Rzewski:
  - Pocket Symphony (2000) + percussion
  - Brussels Diary (2010)
- George Perle: Critical Moments 2 (2001) + percussion
- Martin Bresnick: My Twentieth Century (2002) + viola
- Zhou Long:Five Elements (2002) + percussion; also exists in a version with Chinese instruments
- Sebastian Currier: Static (2003); winner of the 2007 Grawemeyer Award
- Jennifer Higdon: Zaka (2003) + percussion
- Theo Verbey: Perplex (2004) + vibraphone
- Rolf Wallin: The Age of Wire and String (2005)
- Stuart Greenbaum: Book of Departures (2007) + percussion
- Stephen Hartke: Meanwhile: Incidental Music to Imaginary Puppet Plays (2007) + viola (rather than violin) and percussion
- Steve Reich: Double Sextet (2007) for Pierrot ensemble with tape or 12 players; winner of the 2009 Pulitzer Prize
- John Woolrich In the Mirrors of Asleep (2007)
- Mohammed Fairouz: Unwritten (2010) + soprano
- Michael Seltenreich: Sparks & Flares (2010) + percussion
- Greg Caffrey:
  - The Garden of Earthly Delights (2016) + percussion
  - Three movements on the work of William Scott (2017) + percussion
  - Things fall apart; the centre cannot hold (2018) + percussion
- Graham Waterhouse: Irish Phoenix (2017) + soprano
- Gabriel Vicéns: El Matorral (2022) + vibraphone
- Elena Doria Winell:
  - "reaching towards, reaching from" (2023) + percussion
  - "blood...all over my hands" (2023) + soprano and percussion
- Nicholas Tran: "on becoming space // Emergent Becoming" (2023)+ percussion
- Armando Bayolo:
  - Action Figure (2001) + percussion
  - Wide Open Spaces (2014) + percussion
  - Nadie puede dar lo que no tiene (2020) + percussion
  - Holbein Dances (2021) - flute and percussion
  - Cancionero de luto (2023) + chorus and percussion
- Xi Wang: Echo Poem Image (2010) + percussion
- Carlos Sanchez-Gutierrez:
  - Luciérnagas (1999) + percussion
  - Five Memos (2009) + percussion
  - Diaries II (2018) + percussion
