= Roger Zare =

American composer

Roger Joseph Zare (born 1985 Sarasota, Florida) is a Chinese-American composer and pianist. Currently based in Boone, North Carolina. He is known primarily for his orchestral and wind ensemble works, several of which have received significant recognition in the contemporary music community.

== Life ==
Zare grew up in Sarasota, Florida, and began playing piano at age 5, violin at age 11, and began composing at age 14. He received his BM from the USC Thornton School of Music in 2007, his MM from the Peabody Conservatory in 2009, and his DMA from the University of Michigan in 2012. Zare's teachers have included Bright Sheng, Kristin Kuster, Paul Schoenfield, Michael Daugherty, Derek Bermel, David Smooke, Christopher Theofanidis, Tamar Diesendruck, Donald Crockett, Morten Lauridsen, Frederick Lesemann, Betty Hines, and Rex Willis. Before his collegiate career, Zare attended Pine View School in Osprey, Florida.

=== 2005–2010 ===
In 2005, while studying under Tamar Diesendruck at USC, Zare won the New York Youth Symphony's 65th annual First Music commission and was the youngest composer in the foundation's history to receive that honor, marking the beginning of Zare's professional career. For the group, Zare wrote The Other Rainbow, which was premiered in Carnegie Hall in 2006. Later that year, his 2004 orchestral piece Fog was performed by the Sarasota Orchestra under the baton of Leif Bjaland.

In 2007, Zare's career-establishing work Green Flash was premiered at USC under the baton of composer and conductor Donald Crockett. Green Flash received a reading with the 2008 American Composers Orchestra Underwood Readings, conducted by Anne Manson, and Zare subsequently won the workshop's 2008 Underwood Commission. Green Flash also received ASCAP's 2009 Rudolf Nissim Prize, and BMI's prestigious student composer award in 2007, and the Symphony in C composition competition in 2011. Green Flash has subsequently been published by The Theodore Presser Company.

Following the Underwood Readings, Juilliard faculty member and Pulitzer Prize-winning composer Christopher Rouse wrote in 2009 that:

Roger Zare writes for orchestra like a real natural. It's a medium that seems to be in his blood.

Also in 2007, Zare was invited to the USC Thornton Wind Ensemble's performance of Lift-Off, conducted by H. Robert Reynolds. Lift-Off would go on to win first prize in the 3rd Frank Ticheli Competition, category 2, for works graded 3–4. Subsequently, it was performed at the Midwest Clinic by the Mason High School Wind Symphony, directed by Micah Ewing, and published by Manhattan Beach Music in 2016.

Zare's 2008 Underwood Commission from the American Composers Orchestra was a fifteen-minute single-movement work titled Time Lapse, premiered by the ACO, conducted by Anne Manson in Carnegie Hall. Focusing on gestures that would be expanded or compressed temporally, this work includes an extended technique that involves tying magnetic tape to piano and harp strings to create an ethereal bowed effect. This technique was first developed by David Smooke, and a demonstration of this technique is available on YouTube. Other works of Zare's that use magnetic tape include Oneironaut's Journey, premiered by the Aspen Contemporary Ensemble in 2010, and Alarum Bells, commissioned and premiered by Jeannette Fang in 2015. Alarum Bells also uses rubber super balls as a piano preparation, bounced onto the piano strings, to create a bell-like effect. Earlier, in 2006, Zare's first work for prepared piano, Dark and Stormy Night, involves placing and manipulating ping pong balls on the piano strings, to create rattling sounds and theatrical effects when the balls unpredictably bounce into the air. Both Alarum Bells and Dark and Stormy Night require an obligato page turner who assists the pianist with tasks related to the preparations.

Zare received another BMI award for his orchestral work, Aerodynamics in 2009, and received honorable mention in the 2012 ASCAP Frederick Fennell Prize for its wind ensemble transcription. This work was also chosen for the 2009 Minnesota Orchestra Composer Institute, then curated by Aaron Jay Kernis, and it was conducted by Osmo Vanska.

=== 2010–2015 ===
In 2010, Zare was awarded a Charles Ives Prize and a fellowship to the Aspen Music Festival and School Composition Masterclass program. Zare also was chosen for the Cabrillo Festival of Contemporary Music's composer–conductor workshop, run by the Conductors Guild. Christopher Lees and Jordan Randall Smith both conducted Aerodynamics with the Cabrillo Festival Orchestra. Later in 2010, Zare was invited to be composer-in-residence at the Chamber Music Festival of Lexington, then known as the UBS Chamber Music Festival, directed by violinist Nathan Cole. Zare spent a week in residence in Lexington, Kentucky, presented his music to local schools, and performed on a family concert with the other musicians of the festival. Zare was commissioned to write a quartet for clarinet, violin, cello, and piano, and the resulting work, Geometries, has received numerous performances since, including twice in Hong Kong at the 2013 Intimacy of Creativity workshop, directed by Bright Sheng, and at the 2014 Hong Kong International Chamber Music Festival, where Zare performed Geometries with violinist Cho-Liang Lin, cellist, Jian Wang, and clarinetist Burt Hara.

In 2011, Zare was commissioned by clarinetist Alexander Fiterstein to write a concerto for clarinet and wind ensemble. Bennu's Fire was premiered by Fiterstein and the California State University Northridge Wind Ensemble at the 2011 International Clarinet Association "Clarinetfest" Conference in Northridge. Bennu's Fire also received an ASCAP Morton Gould award in 2012 and a BMI student composer award. Bennu's Fire has since been performed by the United States Air Force Band, with Technical Sergeant Brian Wahrlich as the soloist.

Throughout the summer of 2012, Zare served as composer in residence with the Salt Bay Chamberfest in Damariscotta, Maine, and made three trips to present about his music to patrons of the festival. Through a program called "Sound Investment," he was commissioned by a consortium of patrons to write a new piece for the festival, On the Electrodynamics of Moving Bodies. Named after Albert Einstein's paper of the same name that describes his theory of special relativity, the music provides an aural description of accelerating to relativistic speeds.

Zare has been focusing on writing for wind ensemble since the early 2010s. In 2012, with the help of H. Robert Reynolds, Zare arranged a 29-member consortium of collegiate wind ensembles to commission Mare Tranquillitatis. Originally for string orchestra and commissioned by Jeffrey Bishop at Shawnee Mission Northwest High School in 2007, this work is named after the Apollo 11 landing site on the Moon. Since 2012, the wind ensemble version of Mare Tranquillitatis has received over 80 performances, including two performances in July, 2016 by the United States Army Band "Pershing's Own." Zare has served in many residencies at universities and high schools around the United States, and his wind works have been performed at CBDNA regional conferences, the Midwest Clinic, the Texas Music Educators Association conference, and by numerous honor bands.

In the fall of 2012, Zare was honored as the Sioux City Symphony Orchestra Composer of the Year. Zare joined the symphony for a week-long residency, during which he also visited local schools and colleges to meet with composition students, teach masterclasses, and present on his compositional process. The culmination of this week was a performance of Aerodynamics by the Sioux City Symphony, directed by Ryan Haskins, as well as the premiere of Spectral Fanfare, a work for brass octet and percussion on the same program.

Later in the fall of 2012, Zare composed Fractal Miniatures for the SONAR new music ensemble in Baltimore. Originally for mixed nonet, Zare has also made versions for mixed sextet and full orchestra. Fractal Miniatures has won the 2014 Boston New Music Initiative call for scores, the 2014 Boston Musica Viva composition competition, the 2015 Northridge Composition Prize, the 2015 Illinois State University Red Note Festival composition competition in the chamber orchestra category, and grand prize in the China-US Emerging Composers Competition in 2016. Fractal Miniatures is a set of eight short movements that represent artistic impressions of various fractals. The symmetry and recursive nature of fractals informs the construction of this work on multiple levels, and its visceral energy, contrasts between angular and rounded shapes, and vibrant harmonic palate strongly connect this piece to the visual nature of much of Zare's music.

Embracing his love of science, in July 2014, Zare participated in a workshop presented by CERN at the Montreux Jazz Festival, The Physics of Music and the Music of Physics. Across the lake from the Large Hadron Collider, the Donald Sinta Quartet joined him in Montreux, Switzerland, and performed his saxophone quartets, LHC and Z(4430).

=== 2015–present ===
During the spring of 2015, Zare's orchestral work, Tectonics, triumphed in the 3rd Senzoku Contemporary Composition Competition, held in Tokyo. Originally written as his doctoral dissertation at the University of Michigan, Tectonics was performed by the Senzoku New Philharmonic Orchestra and was awarded first prize in the orchestral category of the competition.

One of Zare's biggest interests has been NASA's space program, and he avidly follows both crewed and uncrewed missions as NASA seeks to explore the Solar System. Inspired by NASA's first mission to the dwarf planet Pluto, Zare composed a work named after the New Horizons probe in 2015. A commission from the Chesapeake Chamber Music Festival, directed by Marcy Rosen and J. Lawrie Bloom, it was premiered in June, 2015.

Later in 2015, Zare was commissioned by Missouri Western State University to write a work celebrating the university's centennial. His celebratory work, We Are the Movers and Shakers, for choir and wind ensemble set the first stanza of Arthur O'Shaughnessy's famous Ode.

In the fall of 2015, Zare received a Copland House residency award. During his month-long stay at Aaron Copland's house in Cortlandt, New York, Zare composed a saxophone sonata inspired by the rain cycle for Scotty Phillips, who premiered it at the North American Saxophone Alliance Biennial Conference in March 2016.

During the spring of 2016, Zare was one of six composers selected to participate in the Chicago Civic Orchestra Composers Project. His work, Lunation 1113, was coached by members of Eighth Blackbird, and performed at Chicago Symphony Center in May 2016.

During the summer of 2016, Zare was invited to serve as the Kaplan Fellow in composition at the Bowdoin International Music Festival. At the festival, Zare wrote two new compositions and had nine performances of his works, including two world premieres and two American premieres. Zare also helped coordinate the composition program and served as a liaison between the festival's composer in residence, Derek Bermel, and the composition students. He taught composition lessons throughout the summer and organized the "Guinea Pigs in Bow Ties" concert, a 48-hour marathon in which composers are paired with musicians at random, and then compositions and written and premiered in the span of the following two days.

Throughout 2016 and 2017, an interdisciplinary collaboration partnered Zare with Elizabeth Hicks, an astrophysicist, and Megan Rhyme, a choreographer, producing Far from Equilibrium, an evening-length dance piece for clarinet quartet and eight dancers based on the physics of turbulence. After six performances in Chicago in the summer of 2016, members of the project were invited to present at the 2017 New Music Gathering at Bowling Green State University in May, 2017.

== Discography ==
- Collider by the Donald Sinta Quartet – LHC and Z(4430).
- Confluences (Mark Records) by the Drake University Wind Symphony, directed by Robert Muenier – Mare Tranquillitatis
- Unraveled by the Akropolis Reed Quintet – Variations on Reverse Entropy.
- Voicings (GIA Publications) by the University of North Texas Wind Symphony, directed by Eugene Corporon – Lift-Off.
- Teaching Music Through Performance in Band, Volume 10 (GIA Publications) by the University of North Texas Wind Symphony, directed by Eugene Corporon – Mare Tranquillitatis.
- My Song (NAMI Records Japan) by Kayako Matsunaga – Dark and Stormy Night.
