= Andrew Kuster =

American writer, composer, and conductor

Andrew Thomas Kuster is an American writer, composer, and conductor.

== Biography ==
Kuster was born in Madison, Wisconsin, the son of Thomas and Judy Kuster. He grew up in New Ulm, Minnesota. After attending Bethany Lutheran College in Mankato, Minnesota, he earned a Bachelor of Music in Composition from St. Olaf College in Northfield, Minnesota. At St. Olaf he studied composition with Arthur Campbell and performed with the St. Olaf Choir under Kenneth Jennings and Anton Armstrong. He earned a Master of Music in Composition from Minnesota State University, Mankato, where he studied with Steve Heitzeg. In 2000, he received the Doctor of Musical Arts degree in the Literature and Performance of Choral Music from the University of Colorado Boulder, where he studied with Joan Catoni Conlon, Lawrence Kaptein, Lynn Whitten, William Kearns, and Alan Luhring. He worked as a text reviewer for the Text Creation Partnership at the University of Michigan and as staff editor for the Kurt Weill Foundation in New York City. He is a member of the American Choral Directors Association Research and Publications Committee. From 1997 to 2011 he was married to the composer Kristin Kuster. Currently, he lives in Ann Arbor, Michigan.

== Work ==
Dr. Kuster works as Executive Editor of scholarly editions at Music of the United States of America.

He has written and composed music for Lessons With Hypatia, a fictionalized historical account of the philosopher Hypatia and the burning of the Library of Alexandria for music theater, and The Soulless, a work for music theater set about love, death, and discovering joy in the unexpected.

He regularly organizes and conducts performances and recordings of music for chamber chorus. He has worked closely with University of Michigan faculty composers Evan Chambers and Andy Kirshner in performances and recordings of their new works. He has specialized in music by Stravinsky, Messiaen, Amy Beach, Kurt Weill, and Heinrich Schütz. His conducting responsibilities have included the University of Colorado Women's Chorus, the Boulder Chorale, and the associate conductor of the University Musical Society Choral Union in Ann Arbor.

He co-edited the critical edition of Zaubernacht by Kurt Weill (ISBN 978-0-913574-65-2) and has published several scholarly performing editions of music by Heinrich Schütz, including Geistliche Chor-Music (ISBN 1-4116-4243-0). His articles about Webern, Rachmaninoff, and Britten have appeared in the Choral Journal, and A-R Editions has published his critical edition of Amy Beach's The Sea-Fairies (ISBN 0-89579-435-7).

In 2001, the American Choral Directors Association awarded Dr. Kuster the Julius Herford Prize for Distinguished Doctoral Research in Choral Music for his writing about Igor Stravinsky's twelve-tone choral works.
