= Kuster =

Kuster is a surname; notable people with this surname include:

- Andrew Kuster (born 1969), American writer, composer, conductor; former husband of Kristin Kuster
- Ann McLane Kuster (Annie Kuster, born 1956), United States attorney and politician
- Anton Kuster (born 1923), Swiss sprint canoer
- Bill Kuster (1930–2006), American television meteorologist
- Brigitte Kuster (born 1959), French politician
- Edward G. Kuster (1878–1961), American attorney, musician, and theatre director
- Judith Kuster, American speech-language pathologist
- Kristin Kuster (born 1973), American composer; former spouse of Andrew Kuster
- Selina Kuster (born 1991), Swiss footballer

== See also ==
- Kuster Mill, historic fulling mill in Pennsylvania
- Küster
- Kuester
