= Mark Kilstofte =

American classical composer

Mark Kilstofte (born 1958) is an American composer, and professor at Furman University, Greenville, South Carolina, reared in Pueblo, Colorado.

== Life ==
Kilstofte was trained as a singer at St. Olaf College and also studied conducting in addition to his compositional studies. He earned his doctorate at the University of Michigan. His primary composition teachers were William Albright, Leslie Bassett, William Bolcom and Eugene Kurtz. Before coming to Furman, Kilstofe taught for two years at Wayne State University.

Kilstofte's works are characterized by a respect for, and a firm command of, earlier styles and compositional processes; and his work often superimposes creative harmonic structures on lyric lines. Kilstofte has received a number of prestigious compositional awards, including the Rome Prize, the Rudolf Nissim Award, the Goddard Lieberson Fellowship and the Charles Ives Scholarship, the Aaron Copland award (twice), the Francis and William Schuman Fellowship, and the Composers' Award for String Quartet.

His works include orchestral compositions, pieces for band/wind ensemble, chamber works, and choral compositions. The music of Mark Kilstofte is published by the Newmatic Press, Boelke-Bomart, Inc., Gordon V. Thompson Music, Kjos Music Company, Roger Dean Publishing Company, and Equilibrium Recordings. Some of his works have been recorded.
