= Küster =

Küster (German for "sacristan") is a German occupational surname. Notable people with the surname include:

- Ernst Küster (1874–1953), German botanist
- Ernst Georg Ferdinand Küster (1839–1930), German surgeon
- Heinrich Küster (1870–1956), German architect and town officer
- Heinrich Carl Küster (1807–1876), German malacologist and entomologist
- Konrad Küster (born 1959), German musicologist
- Ludolph Küster (1670–1716), German classical scholar, editor of ancient Greek texts
- Susen Küster (born 1994), German hammer thrower

== See also ==
- Mother Küsters' Trip to Heaven, a 1975 German film by Rainer Werner Fassbinder
- Kuster
- Kuester
