= Andrew Imbrie =

American composer (1921–2007)

- Born: April 6, 1921
- Died: December 5, 2007 (aged 86)
- Education: Princeton University, University of California, Berkeley
- Era: Contemporary

Andrew Welsh Imbrie (April 6, 1921 – December 5, 2007) was an American contemporary classical music composer and pianist.

== Career ==
Imbrie was born in New York City and began his musical training as a pianist when he was 4. In 1937, he went to Paris to study composition briefly with Nadia Boulanger and piano with Robert Casadesus. He returned to the United States the next year to attend Princeton University where he studied with Roger Sessions, receiving his undergraduate degree in 1942. His senior thesis there, a string quartet, was recorded by the Juilliard Quartet. During World War II he served in the U.S. Army as a Japanese translator. Afterwards, he went to the University of California, Berkeley, where he received an M.A. in Music in 1947; there he continued to study with Sessions, who had taken a position at Berkeley.

Imbrie taught composition, theory, and analysis at Berkeley from 1949 until his retirement in 1991. In the summer of 1991, he was Composer-in-Residence at Tanglewood in Lenox, Massachusetts.

In addition to his principal teaching job at Berkeley, he served as a visiting professor at the University of Chicago, Brandeis University, Northwestern University, New York University, the University of Alabama, and Harvard University, and had a regular teaching post at the San Francisco Conservatory.

He died at his home in Berkeley, California at the age of 86.

His notable students include Larry Austin, Tamar Diesendruck, Richard Festinger, Alden Jenks, Frank La Rocca, Neil Rolnick, Valerie Samson, Allen Shearer, Laura Schwendinger, Nils Frykdahl, Kurt Rohde, Hi Kyung Kim, Leslie Wildman and Carolyn Yarnell.

== Style ==
Imbrie's style was influenced early by Béla Bartók, and then by Roger Sessions, his teacher at both Princeton and Berkeley. Imbrie preferred harmony that was non-triadic, or if triadic, non-functional, and a tightly organized, often atonal, contrapuntal texture with attention to careful motivic development; he avoided the serial techniques that dominated art music composition after the Second World War. Imbrie was also attentive to melodic line and shape to make a free atonal language accessible.

== Selected compositions ==
Imbrie's body of work spans many genres. His chief works are:

- Three Against Christmas (1960 opera)
- Angle of Repose (1976 opera)
- Dandelion Wine (1961 for chamber ensemble)
- To a Traveler (1971 for chamber ensemble)
- Sextet for Six Friends (2007 for chamber ensemble)
- Drumtaps for chorus with orchestra (text by Whitman)
- Prometheus Bound for chorus with orchestra (text by Green after Aeschylus)
- Adam for chorus with orchestra (text from medieval and Civil War sources)
- Requiem (1984, chorus with orchestra)
- Three symphonies
- Eight concertos
- Songs for voice
- Sonatas for various instruments
- Chamber works for diverse instrumental ensembles
- Works for choral ensembles
- Five string quartets

== Recordings ==
First Recordings of Two Naumburg Award Compositions. Columbia Records, MS 6597

- Violin Concerto

Andrew Imbrie. New York: Composers Recordings Inc., 1973. Rereleased, New World Records, 2007.

- Symphony No. 3
- Serenade for flute, viola and piano
- Sonata for cello and piano

New Music for Virtuosos. New York: New World Records, 1977.

- Three Sketches

Andrew Imbrie and Gunther Schuller. New York: New World Records, 1978.

- String Quartet No. 4

New Music Series Vol. 3. Neuma Records, 1993

- Short Story

Collage New Music. Boston: GM Recordings, 1989.

- Pilgrimage

Andrew Imbrie. Boston: GM Recordings, 1993.

- String Quartets 4 & 5
- Impromptu for Violin and Piano

Music of Andrew Imbrie. New York: CRI, 1994.

- Symphony No. 3
- Serenade for Flute, Viola and Piano
- Sonata for cello and piano

Dream Sequence – Chamber Music of Andrew Imbrie. New York: New World Records, 1995.

- Dream Sequence
- Roethke Songs
- Three Piece Suite
- Campion Songs
- To a Traveler

Andrew Imbrie, Requiem. New Rochelle, NY: Bridge Records, 2000.

- Requiem
- Piano Concerto No. 3

Andrew Imbrie. Albany, NY: Albany Records, 2002.

- Spring Fever
- Chicago Bells
- Songs of Then and Now

== Sources ==
- Ann P. Basart, Martin Brody: "Andrew Imbrie", Grove Music Online, ed. L. Macy (Accessed July 21, 2006) (subscription required)
- Kennedy, Michael (2006), The Oxford Dictionary of Music, 985 pages, ISBN 0-19-861459-4
