= Song cycles (disambiguation) =

Song cycles are groups of individually complete songs designed to be performed in sequences as units.

Song cycles may also refer to:

- Song cycles (Killmayer)
- Song cycles (Schubert)
- Song cycles (Waterhouse)
