= Festinger =

Festinger is a surname. Notable people with the surname include:

- Richard Festinger (born 1948), American composer
- Leon Festinger (1919–1989), American social psychologist, responsible for the development of the theory of cognitive dissonance
