= Hi Kyung Kim =

South Korean composer (born 1954)

- Hangul: 김희경
- RR: Gim Huigyeong
- MR: Kim Hŭigyŏng

Hi Kyung Kim (Korean: 김희경; born 1954) is a South Korean composer.

== Life ==
Hi Kyung Kim was born in South Korea. She graduated from Seoul National University with a BA and the University of California, Berkeley, with an MA and PhD, where she studied composition with Andrew Imbrie, Olly Wilson, Gérard Grisey, and Sung-Jae Lee. As a benefit of the U.C. Berkeley's George C. Ladd Prix de Paris, she worked at Institut de Rechéreche et Coordination Acoustique/Musique (IRCAM) and École Normale Supérieure in Paris from 1988 to 1990.

After completing her studies, Kim took a position as assistant professor at the University of California, Santa Cruz. She returned to Korea in 1985 and 1998 for research and study of Korean music, and also researched the music of Elliott Carter at the Paul Sacher Foundation in Basel, Switzerland.

== Honors and awards ==
- Eisner prize in Creative Arts and
- Two Di Lorenzo Composition Prizes
- U.C. Berkeley's George C. Ladd Prix de Paris
- Walter Hinrichsen Award from the American Academy and Institute of Arts and Letters

== Works ==
Selected works include:

- Thousand Gates (2010/2011) Korean and Western choreography, Korean ensemble (percussion, haegeum), Western ensemble (violin, cello, clarinet/bass clarinet, percussion) and multi-media
- Rituel III (2004/5) Korean choreography/percussion, Korean ensemble (janggo, daegeum) and Western ensemble (violin, cello, clarinet/bass clarinet, percussion), multi-media
- Rituel II (2002) Korean choreography/Korean percussion, Korean ensemble (chanting, piri/bamboo oboe, saengwhang/mouth organ, hun/clay flute, yangkeum/dulcimer); Western ensemble (violin, cello, clarinet/bass clarinet, percussion)
- Rituel (2001) Korean dance/percussion and violin, cello, clarinet, percussion
- When He was Six Hundred Years Old (2010) haegeum (Korean fiddle), clarinet, cello
- Isle of Eeo (2010) violin (2), viola, cello, percussion
- Clarinet Quintet (2009), clarinet, string quartet, editing of unfinished work of Andrew Imbrie
- At the Edge of the Ocean (2001/2003) flute, clarinet, violin, viola, cello, percussion
- Trio "Sori" (2002), Korean daegeum (bamboo flute), clarinet and cello
- Primitive Dance (1990/1999) string quartet
- Breaking the Silence (1996) violin, cello, piano
- Unknown Lives (1995) flute, clarinet, violin, viola, cello, percussion, piano
- When You Rush (1991) flute, clarinet, bassoon, trombone, violin, cello, harp
- What are Years? (1988/1991) 2 movements, soprano, flute, clarinet, guitar, violin, double bass
- Short Dance (1987) string quartet
- Encounter (1986) clarinet, bass clarinet, bassoon, cello and five percussion players
- Ari for soprano & string quartet (1983)
- Satisfaction (1977) chamber ensemble
- Musical Gathering (1976) flute, oboe, clarinet, bassoon, horn
- Crash (1975) string quartet
- Resistance (1975) soprano, piano
- FOR RAE: "I am too excited to tell you" piano solo
- The Poet KIM SAT GAT: daegeum solo (bamboo flute) (2007/2010)
- Secret Wine: percussion solo (2008)
- Two Years with the Seine (2007) 4 movements, clarinet and cello
- A Story: gayageum solo (2006) 3 movements
- Orange Pastel (2001/2009) two percussionists
- Crystal Drops (2000/2003) 2 movements, two pianos
- After the Fall (1998) clarinet and bass clarinet
- Instant Breath: flute solo (1999)
- Reflection: clarinet solo (1985)
- Intrigues (1985) 3 movements, prepared piano and clarinet
- Dialogue (1974) violin, piano
- Path way: piano solo (1974)
- Requiem chamber orchestra & chamber choir
- Islands in the Bay, percussion concerto (1993), 3 movements
- Conversation for Orchestra (1976)
- Looking at the New Heaven and Earth (1976) mixed voice SATB and piano
- Step (1988) for computer/tape

Her music has been recorded and issued on CD, including:

- Crystal Drops: Music By Hi Kyung Kim (2008)
- Tribute To Andrew Imbrie In Celebration Of His Eightieth Birthday (2005)
- Solos And Duos: Music By Andrew Imbrie And Hi Kyung Kim (2008)
- Tribute To Chou Wen-Chung (2009)
- Kim: Unknown Lives (2000)
