= Tonia Ko =

Hong Kong composer

- Born: 1988 (age 37–38); British Hong Kong
- Education: Eastman School of Music (BM); Jacobs School of Music (MM); Cornell University (DMA)
- Occupation: Composer
- Awards: Guggenheim Fellowship (2018)

Tonia Ko is a Hong Kong composer. Based and educated in the United States and United Kingdom, Ko is a 2018 Guggenheim Fellow and is a Senior Lecturer in Composition at the Royal Holloway, University of London Department of Music.

== Biography ==
Ko was born in 1988 in British Hong Kong and raised in Honolulu, where she was educated at ʻIolani School (graduating in 2006). She was originally a choir singer, pianist, and violist during her youth, but had decided to go into music composition by the time she was fifteen. She subsequently did post-secondary studies at Eastman School of Music (where she got her BM with highest distinction), the Jacobs School of Music (where she got her MM and the 2011 Georgina Joshi Composition Commission Prize), Cornell University (where she got her DMA), Tanglewood Music Center, and Royaumont Voix Nouvelles Academy. She also did postdoctoral studies at the University of Chicago's Center for Contemporary Composition and at City, University of London.

In 2013, she was awarded a Charles Ives Scholarship. In 2015, she was a Young Concert Artists alumnus. On 6 March 2016, her symphony Strange Sounds and Explosions Worldwide had its premiere performed by the New York Youth Symphony at Carnegie Hall; Vivien Schweitzer of The New York Times said of the work: "A listener might assume that a new symphony [with that title] would depict perilous global situations. But the title [...] alludes to fireworks and other joyful events, as well as natural ones like erupting volcanoes." In 2018, she was awarded a Guggenheim Fellowship in Music Composition. That same year, she was awarded a MacDowell Fellowship, where she composed the string quartet piece Plain, Air; in September of that year, Spektral Quartet performed the premiere of Plain, Air at the Openlands Lakeshore Preserve. Her composition Still Life Crumbles was performed at the 2020 Grand Teton Music Festival.

In 2024, she was awarded a second MacDowell Fellowship, where she composed Breath, Contained III, the third part of her concerto performed on bubble wrap, Breath, Contained. The same year, another composition of hers, Her Land, premiered at an American Composers Orchestra concert at Carnegie Hall.

As an educator, she was an Associate Instructor of Music Theory at the Jacobs School of Music in addition to being a masters student, before becoming a Senior Lecturer in Composition at the Royal Holloway, University of London Department of Music.
