= Alden Jenks =

American composer

Alden Jenks (born August 10, 1940) is an American composer.

== Biography ==
Alden Jenks was born in Michigan and received a B.A. from Yale University and an M.A. from the University of California, Berkeley. He studied composition with Lawrence Moss, Andrew Imbrie and Seymour Shifrin. He also studied composition in 1967 with Karlheinz Stockhausen at the University of California, Davis, and electronic music with David Tudor and Anthony Gnazzo.

As a performer, he served as a controller of the live electronics for Stockhausen's 1967 Darmstadt collective-composition project, Ensemble, and performed on synthesizer in the 25th anniversary concert of Terry Riley's In C in 1989, released as a recording in 1995 on New Albion Records CD NA071.

As a composer he is primarily known for his work in electronic media, and was Professor of Composition and Director of the E. L. Wiegand Composition Studio at the San Francisco Conservatory. John Adams has cited him as an influential colleague, crediting Jenks with introducing him to Wagner His composition Nagasaki won the Bourges Electronic Music Competition, and Marrying Music won the Viotti-Valsesia International Music Competition award.

== Compositions (selective list) ==
- Nagasaki, electronic music (1983) awarded a prize at the Bourges Festival in 1983
- Those Long Canadian Winters, theatre music
- Mummermusic, music for a mime act by Peter Kors (1974)
- Ansichtskarte an Johann, for two pianos (1978/83)
- Marrying Music, for two pianos (1978/83) Winner of "Diploma and Medal" in the Viotti-Valsesia International Music Competition
- Femme Fatale: The Invention of Personality, incidental music for the play by Laura Farabough (1981)
- Calcululations, MIDI composition (1990)
- MENAGE, for synthesizer, piano, and percussion (1994)
- "Letter from Linda" (1998–99)
- Martin Put That Gun Away, electroacoustic music (2000)
- Ognaggio al'Anzzonio, electroacoustic music (2003)
- Sour Music (2003)
- "Prelude", for organ (2003)
- "Ghost Songs" (2004)
- "Five California Songs" on texts by Richard Brautigan, Robert Hass, Leonard Nathan, and Philip Whalen for tenor, cello, and piano (2006)
- "The Soup" (2008/09)
- "Tokyo Crow" (2009)
- "Unrestful Sleep", piano solo (2011)
- "Hammered", piano and computer (2013)
- "Oh, It's You", soprano and electronics (2013)
