= Kuester =

Kuester is a surname. Notable people who used this name include:

- Brian Kuester, American lawyer
- Dennis J. Kuester, American businessman
- Edith Haines Kuester (1870–1956), American pianist, composer
- Gus Kuester (1888–1980), American politician
- John Kuester (born 1955), American basketball coach

== See also ==
- Kuster
- Küster
- Quester
