= Michael Djupstrom =

American composer

Michael Djupstrom (born 1980) is an American composer. Born in St. Paul, Minnesota, he grew up in White Bear Lake, Minnesota. After completing undergraduate and graduate studies in composition at the University of Michigan, Djupstrom moved to Philadelphia, Pennsylvania, where he completed an Artist Diploma at the Curtis Institute of Music. His music has garnered many awards, and is published by Bright Press and Boosey & Hawkes.

His composition teachers include Jennifer Higdon, Richard Danielpour, Bright Sheng and Betsy Jolas, among others.

== Awards ==
- 2002 – ASCAP/CBDNA Frederick Fennell Prize
- 2002 – Walter Beeler Memorial Composition Prize, Ithaca College
- 2003, 2004 – ASCAP Foundation Morton Gould Young Composer Award
- 2004 – William Schuman Prize, BMI Foundation
- 2005 – ASCAP/Lotte Lehmann Foundation Song Cycle Competition, 3rd prize
- 2005 – Music Teachers National Association - Shepherd Distinguished Composer of the Year
- 2006 – Great Wall International Composition Competition, 1st Prize & Audience Prize, Chinese Fine Arts Society
- 2010 – Charles Ives Fellowship, The American Academy of Arts and Letters
- 2012 – American Viola Society's Maurice Gardner Composition Competition grand prize winner for Walimai
- 2012 – Delius International Composition Prize
- 2013 – Columbia Orchestra American Composer Competition winner for Scène et Pas de deux
- 2013 – Grand Prize, Washington Awards, S&R Foundation
- 2014 – Pew Fellowship in the Arts, Pew Center for Arts & Heritage
