= N.E.O.N. =

N.E.O.N. is the acronym for Nevada Encounters of New Music, a symposium and festival of contemporary music taking place yearly at the University of Nevada, Las Vegas. Directed by UNLV faculty composers Virko Baley and Jorge Villavicencio Grossmann, N.E.O.N. began in 2007. The objective of this symposium and festival is a pedagogical one: student composers from the U.S. and abroad gather in Las Vegas for three to four days of intensive activities, including masterclasses, lectures and concerts.

The ensembles-in-residence participating in N.E.O.N. 2007 were ECCE (East Coast Composers Ensemble) and UNLV's NEXTET. The ensembles-in-residence participating in N.E.O.N. 2008 and 2009 were TALEA and UNLV's NEXTET.

N.E.O.N. 2007 featured guest composers Steven Stucky, George Tsontakis, and Paul Chihara. N.E.O.N. 2008 featured guest composers Bernard Rands, Chen Yi, Bruce Boughton, and Dmitri Tymocko. N.E.O.N. 2009 featured guest composers Augusta Read Thomas, Ricardo Zohn-Muldoon, and Tom Flaherty.

Due to financial constraints, N.E.O.N. is in hiatus for 2010.
