= Kristin Kuster =

American composer

Kristin P. Kuster (born 1973) is an American composer of symphonic, vocal and chamber music.

== Biography ==
Kuster was born Kristin Peterson in Raleigh, North Carolina and grew up in Boulder, Colorado. She received her Doctor of Musical Arts degree from the University of Michigan, where she studied with William Bolcom, Michael Daugherty, Evan Chambers, and William Albright. She was awarded the Charles Ives Fellowship from the American Academy of Arts and Letters and the Underwood Emerging Composer Commission from American Composers Orchestra. Kuster is an Associate Professor of Composition at the University of Michigan School of Music, Theatre & Dance. She lives in Ann Arbor, Michigan. She was married to Andrew Kuster from 1997 to 2011.

== Style ==
Kuster "writes commandingly for the orchestra," and her music "has an invitingly tart edge" (The New York Times). Kuster's colorfully enthralling compositions take inspiration from architectural space, the weather, and mythology. Her orchestral music "unquestionably demonstrates her expertise in crafting unique timbres" (Steve Smith, Night after Night).

== Works ==
Orchestra and orchestra with voices

- Iron Diamond (2005)
- Myrrha (2006)
- Beneath This Stone (2007)
- Rain On It (2012)
- Devil's Thumb (2013)

Opera and musical theatre

- The Trickster & The Troll (2008)
- A Thousand Acres (2022)

Wind ensemble

- Interior (2006)
- Lost Gulch Lookout (2008)
- Two Jades (2011)

Chamber ensemble

- Ando: Light Against Ahade (2003)
- Jellyfish (2004)
- Breath Beneath (2004)
- Ribbon Earth (2008)
- Perpetual Noon (2008)
- Midnight Mirror (2009)
- Perpetual Afternoon (2009)
- Little Trees (2009)
- Here, Leaving (2010)
- Sweet Poison (2011)
- Rain Chain (2012)
- Parting Wish (2012)
- Ribbon Windows, Curtain Walls (2013)
- Readings From the Middle Seat (2013)
- Red Pine (2014)

Vocal ensemble

- Myrrha (2006)
- Bleed (2007)
- Redness (2008)
- Zephyrus (2009)
- Home (2010)
- Given a Body (2012, 2013)
- Volta (2013)
- Moonrise (2013)
- White Hurricane: 1915 (2014)

Vocal solo

- Silken Branches (2007)
- Soon (2007)
- Sorrow (2007)
- Dream Black Night (2007)
- Long Ago (2008)
- King (2013)

== Sources ==
- Kuster, Kristin P., biography at Naxos Records
- Composer Kristin Kuster Wins 2004 Underwood Commission American Composers Orchestra website
