= Kendall Briggs =

Kendall Durelle Briggs
- Born: January 2, 1959 (age 67); Salt Lake City, Utah
- Genres: Classical
- Occupations: Composer, Professor of Music: The Juilliard School
- Instrument: Pianist
- Years active: 1994 - present
- Website: http://www.seminarsinmusic.com

Kendall Durelle Briggs is an American composer of classical music and music theorist. He is a professor of music theory, music history and analysis at the Juilliard School in New York City. He has authored two books on the subject, The Language and Materials of Music and Tonal Counterpoint. He is a recipient of the Charles Ives Prize in composition from The Academy of Arts and Letters.

== Biography ==
Briggs was born in Salt Lake City, Utah, and grew up in Seattle, Washington. He was first exposed to music by his mother, a classical pianist. He later studied the cello as well. He attended Pacific Lutheran University, where he received a bachelor's degree in composition, and later went on to study at the Juilliard School, where he received his master’s and doctoral degrees. He joined the faculty of The Juilliard School in 1994.

He studied with composers David Diamond and Charles Jones.

== Works ==
Notable works include:

- Rhapsody for Cello and Orchestra ". . . a riveder le stelle"
- Sonata for Flute and Piano
- Sonata for Cello and Piano
- Sonata for French Horn and Piano
- Sonata for Trumpet and Piano
- Sonata for Viola and Piano
- Sonatine for Flute and Piano
- Sonatine for Piano 4-Hands
- Petite Suite for Piano, Violin, Cello
- Serenade for Chamber Orchestra
- Suite for Orchestra
- Symphony No. 1
- Symphony No. 2
- Symphony No. 3
- Sinfonietta for String Orchestra
- 6 Suites for Solo Cello
- 6 Preludes for Piano

== Awards ==
Year	Award	Work
1991	American Academy of Arts and Letters: Charles Ives Prize	
	Presser Foundation Music Award	

== Discography ==
Title	Artist	Role	Year	Label
5 Stars: Favorites from the 5 Browns	The 5 Browns	Arranger	2008	RCA
