= Will Healy (composer) =

American composer (born 1990)

- Born: William Healy; February 15, 1990 (age 36); Bay Ridge, Brooklyn
- Genres: Jazz Fusion; Contemporary Classical; Experimental Hip-Hop; Indie Rock
- Occupation: Composer
- Website: willhealymusic.com

Will Healy (born February 15, 1990) is an American composer, pianist, and artistic director of ShoutHouse, an orchestral hip-hop collective.

== Biography ==
=== Early life and education ===
Healy attended New York City's Loyola School. He completed his Bachelor's of Music degree from Vassar College and received the W.K. Rose Fellowship in Creative Arts and the Jean Slater Edson Prize for his chamber work "Hashima". He obtained a Master's of Music in composition at The Juilliard School where he studied with John Corigliano, Steven Stucky, and Samuel Adler and was recipient of the Richard Rodgers Scholarship.

=== Musical career ===
Healy's work has been performed at The Apollo Theater, the New York Philharmonic's Biennial series, the Aspen Music Festival, on "New Sounds" with John Schaefer (WNYC) and "Making Music" (WBAI), The Kennedy Center, Lincoln Center, Carnegie Hall, New York City Ballet, (le) Poisson Rouge, and Midsummer's Music. In 2021, he worked with Kanye West on his album Donda as an arranger, transcriber, and director on live performances. His commissions include Copland House, the Great Lakes Chamber Festival, Novus New Music, Kyo Shin-An Arts, Robert Fleitz and Carrie Frey, Nancy Allen, and others. In 2018, Healy's work, "Kolmanskop," was presented by EarShot (the National Orchestral Composition Discovery Network) and the Jacksonville Symphony. He was also composer in residence at Midsummer's Music in 2021.

In 2014, Healy founded ShoutHouse, a collaborative artistic project and band made up of four composers, five rappers, three jazz soloists, and more than a dozen classical musicians. Their first full-length album, Cityscapes, was released by New Amsterdam Records in 2019.

== Awards and honors ==
As a composer and arranger, Healy is the recipient of awards including the 2023 ASCAP Leonard Bernstein Award, a 2017 Charles Ives Scholarship from the American Academy of Arts and Letters, an ASCAP Foundation Morton Gould Young Composer Award, the W.K. Rose Fellowship, a JFund commission from the American Composers Forum, Musiqa's inaugural Emerging Composer Commission Program, prizes in the Juilliard and Kaleidoscope Orchestra Composition Competitions.

== Selected works ==
=== Large Ensemble ===
- Passages (2023) for singer, two emcees, instrumental soloists and wind ensemble
- Orbits (2022) for chorus, emcee, instrumental soloists and large ensemble
- Future Caprices (2019) for string orchestra
- Kolmanskop (2016) for large orchestra

=== Chamber ===
- Root Position (2023) for piano quartet
- Mariners (2022) for clarinet, violin, and piano
- Small Spaces (2022) for flute, vibraphone, viola, and cello
- Machine Learning (2020) for clarinet, violin, cello, and piano
- Threats/Threads (2020) for saxophone quartet
- Highwire (2019) for octet
- Sonata for Saxophone and Piano (2018) for alto saxophone and piano
- Speaking (2015) for soprano saxophone and piano
- Upper West Stomp (2015) for saxophone octet (SSAATTBB)
- Synapses for Wind Quintet (2013) for wind quintet

=== Instrumental Solo ===
- Omens (2017) for solo piano
- The Wisher (2017) for solo harp
- Prelude for Rrita (2016) for solo piano
- Etudes for Melancholy Robots (2014-2017) for solo piano
- Nocturnes for Jamie (2013) for solo piano
- Orbit (2012) for solo harp

=== Choral ===
- Scrawl (2019) for SSAATTBB a cappella
- Tell Me (2019) for SSAATTBB and piano

=== Cityscapes (2019) ===
- Mannahatta (2016)
- Hudson Drones (2017)
- Grand Central (2015)
- ANTS (2015)
- Rebuild (2016)

=== ShoutHouse, Music of Will Healy (2015) ===
- The Song I Wanted to Hear (2014)
- Fully Mechanized (2014)
- Light (2014)
- On Lucid Dreams (2014)
- Meet Halfway
