= Laura Clayton =

American pianist and composer

Laura Clayton (born December 8, 1943) is an American pianist and composer. She was born in Lexington, Kentucky, and studied at the Peabody Conservatory in Baltimore and at Columbia University, New York, with Mario Davidovsky. She began studying composition with Darius Milhaud at the Aspen Music School and graduated with a Master of Music in Composition from the New England Conservatory in Boston. She lived for a while in Brazil and then continued her studies at the University of Michigan, graduating with a Doctorate of Musical Arts.

After completing her education, she worked as a composer. In 1980, her work was chosen to represent the United States at the International Rostrum of Composers.

Her compositional style has been describes as rhythmically complex with a "highly refined sense of mystery", inspired by images of nature. Cree Songs for the Newborn, based on creole poems, was chosen to represent the USA at the 1980 UNESCO International Rostrum of Composers in Paris.

== Honors and awards ==
- Charles Ives Prize from the American Academy and Institute of Arts and Letters, 1980
- Walter B. Hinrichsen Award
- NEA awards
- Jerome Foundation grant
- University of Michigan grant
- Alice M. Ditson Fund grant
- Guggenheim Foundation grant, 1984
- MacDowell Fellow

== Works ==
Chamber Music

- Mobile no. 2, for voice and piano, 1975
- O Train Azul for guitar, 1977
- Cree Songs to the Newborn for Soprano and chamber orchestra, 1987
- Passagio, for piano, 1978
- Herself the Tide, for Soprano and piano, 1981
- Panels, for chamber ensemble, 1983
- Clara's Sea, for women's voices, 1988
- Joie, for piano, 1990

Orchestral Music

- Sagarama with piano, 1984
- Terra Lucida, 1988

Tape

- Implosure for two dancers, slide and tape, 1977
- Simichai-ya, sax, echoplex, tape, 1987
