= Sean Shepherd =

American composer

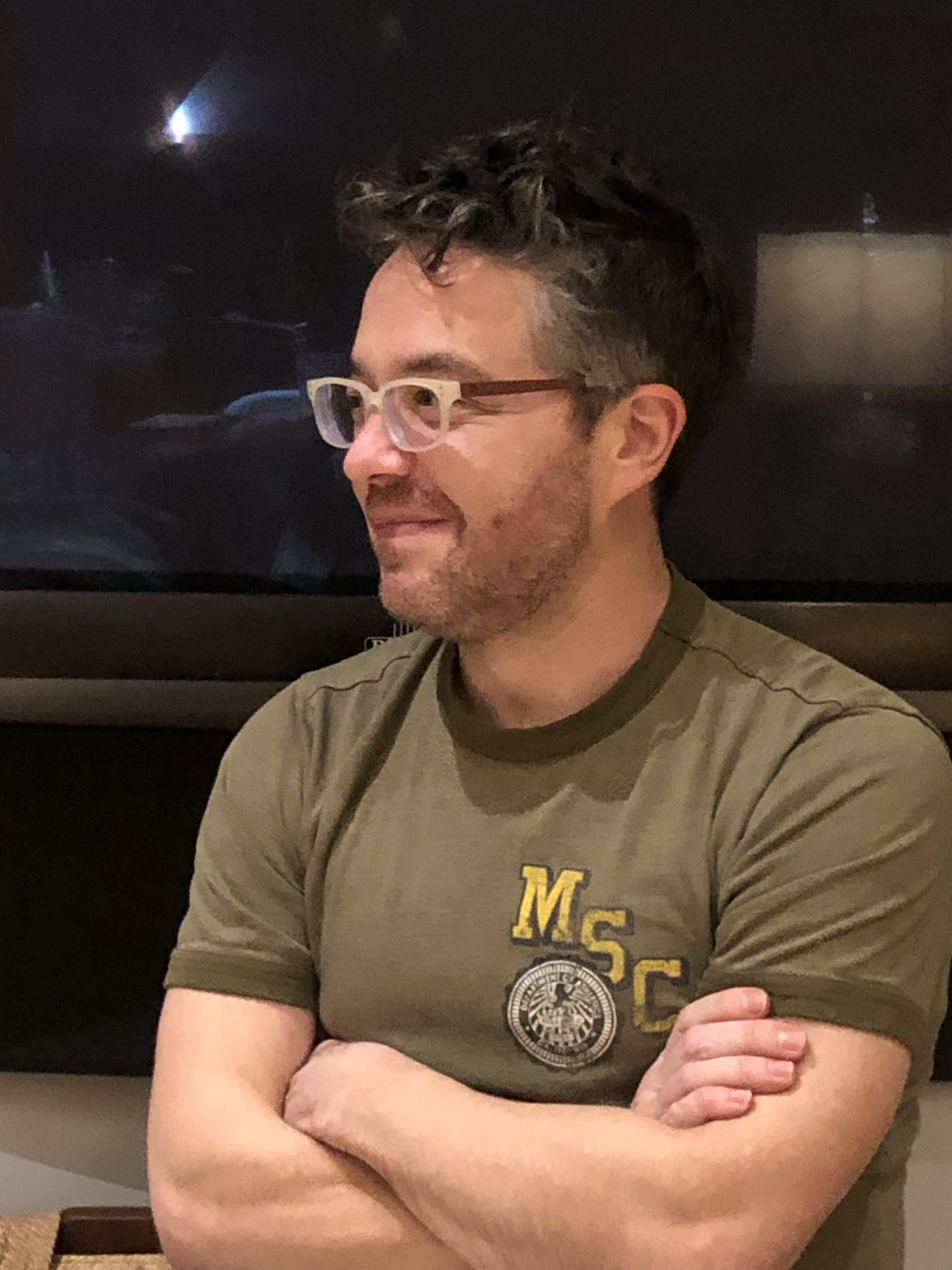
- Composer Sean Shepherd in his home, 2022
- Born: 1979 (age 46–47); Reno, Nevada, U.S.
- Education: Jacobs School of Music; Juilliard School; Cornell University
- Occupation: Composer
- Awards: Charles Ives Living Award (2024); American Academy of Arts and Letters Music Prize (2016); Guggenheim Fellowship (2015); United States Artists Fellowship (2011); Benjamin H. Danks Award from the American Academy of Arts and Letters (2009); Deutsche Bank Fellow at the American Academy in Berlin (2008); International Lutoslawski Award, first prize (2005)
- Website: www.boosey.com/composer/Sean+Shepherd

Sean Shepherd is an American composer based in New York. His work has been performed by major orchestras, ensembles, and performers across the United States, Europe, and Asia. Performances include those with the Boston Symphony Orchestra, the Cleveland Orchestra, the New York Philharmonic, the National Symphony Orchestra, the BBC Symphony Orchestra, and New World Symphony Orchestra, at festivals including the Aldeburgh Festival, Heidelberger Frühling, La Jolla Music Festival, Lucerne Festival, Santa Fe Chamber Music Festival, and Tanglewood. He has performed internationally with Ensemble intercontemporain, the Scharoun Ensemble Berlin, the Asko/Schönberg Ensemble and the Birmingham Contemporary Music Group.

== Early life and education ==
Shepherd was born in 1979 in Reno, Nevada. He performed his undergraduate work at the Jacobs School of Music at Indiana University Bloomington, where he studied with David Dzubay and American composer Claude Baker. His graduate work was completed at the Juilliard School, where he studied with American composer Robert Beaser, followed by doctoral studies with composers Roberto Sierra and composer Steven Stucky at Cornell University, where he earned his DMA (Doctor of Musical Arts).

== Career ==
Shepherd served as the Daniel R. Lewis Composer Fellow at the Cleveland Orchestra and as composer-in-residence of the Reno Philharmonic.

In 2012, Shepherd was named the Kravis Emerging Composer of the New York Philharmonic. Shepherd's "Blue Blazes" premiered with National Symphony Orchestra under the direction of Christoph Eschenbach in 2013.

In 2021, Shepherd's work was featured at the Tanglewood Music Festival and at the Santa Fe Chamber Music Festival. His work was deemed a "season highlight" when performed at the Cabrillo Festival of Contemporary Music in 2021.

Shepherd served as a finalist judge in the 2021 Broadcast Music, Inc.'s 69th Annual Student Composer Awards.

He served as a visiting assistant professor of composition at the University of Chicago from 2022 to 2024.

In 2023, Shepherd was awarded the 2024 Charles Ives Living Award, which includes a 2-year stipend allowing a composer to focus solely on creating new works.

== Works ==
The following works are published by Boosey & Hawkes.

=== Orchestral ===
- Wanderlust (2009)
- Silvery Rills (2011)
- Desert Garden (2011)
- Blue Blazes (2012)
- Tuolumne (2012)
- Magiya (2013)
- Songs (2013)
- Express Abstractionism (2017)
- Melt (2018)
- Sprout (2021)
- Downtime (2022)

=== Concertos ===
- Concerto for Ensemble (2014–15)
- Quadruple Concerto for flute, oboe, clarinet, bassoon and orchestra (2025)

=== Oratorio ===
- On a Clear Day for cello, choir and orchestra (2023)

=== Chamber orchestra ===
- These Particular Circumstances (2009)

=== Ensemble and Chamber Without Voices ===
- Twilight for bassoon and string quartet (2001)
- New Poems – 1907 for mezzo-soprano and ensemble (2002–03)
- Vignette: four Vinaigrettes for wind quintet (2003/05)
- Metamorphoses (2004)
- String Quartet No. 1 (2005)
- Lumens (2005)
- Preludes for piano solo (2005–06)
- Aperture in Shift (2006)
- Wanderlust – Seagulls on High for chamber ensemble (2007)
- Dust for violin and piano (2008)
- Octet (2008)
- the birds are nervous, the birds have scattered (2008)
- Blur (2011)
- Quartet for Oboe and Strings (2011)
- Trio for violin, cello and piano (2012)
- Quintet for oboe, clarinet, violin, viola and contrabass (2013)
- ribboned / braided / spun for solo harp (2014)
- String Quartet No. 2 (2015)
- Means of Escape for mixed ensemble
- wideOPENwide for solo violin (2016)
- Echo for solo oboe or Anglais solo (2017)
- Sonata à 5 for saxophone, violin, viola, cello and piano (2019)
- String Quartet No. 3 (2020)
- Old Instruments for flute and percussion (2021)
- familiar for solo cello (2022)
- Tiny Bright Big True Real for mixed ensemble (2022)
- Simple Machines (2024)
- Latticework for violin and cello (2025)

=== Choral and vocal ===
- Ozymandias for solo voices and ensemble (2005)
- The Daffodils for chorus a cappella (2013)

== Awards and honors ==
Shepherd has received numerous prestigious awards and honors throughout his career:

- Charles Ives Living Award (2024)
- American Academy of Arts and Letters Music Prize (2016)
- Guggenheim Fellowship (2015)
- United States Artists Fellowship (2011)
- Benjamin H. Danks Award from the American Academy of Arts and Letters (2009)
- Deutsche Bank Fellow at the American Academy in Berlin (2008)
- International Lutoslawski Award, first prize (2005)

== Recordings ==
- These Particular Circumstances performed by the New York Philharmonic, conducted by Alan Gilbert. From the album On the Cutting Edge: New Music from CONTACT!, 2010.
- Dust performed by Benjamin Sung and Jihye Chang. From the album Flux Flummoxed: New American Music for Violin and Piano, 2013.
- Blur for Ensemble performed by Ensemble Intercontemporain, conducted by Matthias Pintscher. From the album New York, 2017.
- Magiya performed by the Oregon Symphony, conducted by Carlos Kalmar. From the album Aspects of America, 2018.
- Express Abstractionism, co-commissioned by the Boston Symphony Orchestra and Leipzig Gewandhaus Orchestra, performed by the Boston Symphony Orchestra, conducted by Andris Nelsons. Naxos Records, 2019.
- Florid Hopscotch performed by the Claremont Trio. From the album Queen of Hearts, 2022.
- On a Clear Day for cello, choir and orchestra, performed by Jan Vogler (cello), the Philharmonisches Staatsorchester Hamburg, conducted by Kent Nagano. Released via Deutsche Grammophon on the CAvi imprint, 2025.
