= Heinrich Küster =

German architect and town officer (1870–1956)

Wilhelm E. Heinrich Küster (16 August 1870 in Hanover – 1 Juli 1956 in Görlitz) was a German architect and town officer (1909–1933 as Stadtbaurat of Görlitz).

After his architectural studies (1890–1895) in high technical school in Hanover he worked in Elberfeld (until 1899), in 1905 in Oberhausen, 1905–1908 in Breslau (Wrocław), from 1909 in Görlitz.
