= Tamar Diesendruck =

American composer (born 1946)

- תמר דייזנדרוק
- Born: August 3, 1946 (age 80); Tel Aviv, Israel
- Education: Brandeis University
- Occupation: Composer
- Employer: Berklee College of Music
- Partner: Eric Moe
- Awards: Guggenheim Fellowship (1999)
- Musical career
- Genres: Classical music

Tamar Diesendruck (Hebrew: תמר דייזנדרוק; born August 3, 1946) is an American composer of classical music. A 1999 Guggenheim Fellow, she is also a professor at Berklee College of Music.

== Biography ==
Tamar Diesendruck was born in August 3, 1946 in Tel Aviv, and she later emigrated to the United States, where she grew up in New England. In 1968, she obtained her BA at Brandeis University, where she studied under Martin Boykan, Edward Cohen, and Seymour Shifrin. After obtaining her MA at University of California, Berkeley in 1979, she then remained there to get her PhD in Music Theory and Composition in 1983, with her advisor being Andrew Imbrie.

In 1989, Diesendruck's piece Such Stuff premiered at Carnegie Hall; Carmen Eisner of the Wisconsin State Journal praised it for "hold[ing] plenty of close calls for ears that don't like to take chances", while John Rockwell of The New York Times criticized it for its perceived incoherence. In 1990, she started her series of Tower of Babel-inspired pieces, with Susan Larson of The Boston Globe calling it "the framework for Diesendruck's search for a personal language". One of these pieces, On That Day, when performed by the Dinosaur Annex Music Ensemble in 1991, was called "determinedly un-mysterious" by Richard Buell of The Boston Globe, Robert Croan of the Pittsburgh Post-Gazette called How/Feel the "most substantial and interesting work" of its respective 1993 Pittsburgh New Music Ensemble concert. In 1997, Buell praised her next piece The Grief That Does Not Speak (in lower-case) for its quality but criticized it for "swallowing" several subsequent pieces.

In 2007, she composed Sudoku Variations specifically for Elaine Chew; inspired from a sudoku hobby she recently undertook, its meter structure is inspired by the game's mathematical rules. She was a 2012–2013 Radcliffe Fellow. She released two albums from Centaur Records: Quartets 1+2, Theater of the Ear (2008) and The Grief That Does Not Speak (2011). David Patrick Stearns told The Philadelphia Inquirer that her piece Other Floods, performed at the Philadelphia Episcopal Cathedral in 2013, had "leapt down curious musical rabbit holes [he] was unable to follow".

She was a 1984 Fellow of the American Academy in Rome and a 1986 Charles Ives Scholar. She has been awarded the MacDowell Fellowship twelve times, in 1986, 1988, 1990, 1991, 1993, 1994, 1995, 1996, 1997, 1999, 2000, and 2023. She also won a Library of Congress/Koussevitzky Music Foundation composition grant in 1988. In 1999, she was awarded a Guggenheim Fellowship in music composition, as well as a Goddard Lieberson Fellowship. She won an American Academy of Arts and Letters Award in 2006.

After teaching in several schools such as the San Francisco Conservatory of Music, San Francisco State University (where she worked as a lecturer in 1988), New York University, University of Pittsburgh, and Chatham College, she eventually joined the faculty of Berklee College of Music and became professor there. At Berklee, she teaches classes in composition.

As of 1999, she worked as a composer in Somerville, Massachusetts. Her partner Eric Moe is a composer.
