= Kati Agócs =

Canadian-American composer (born 1975)

Kati Ilona Agócs
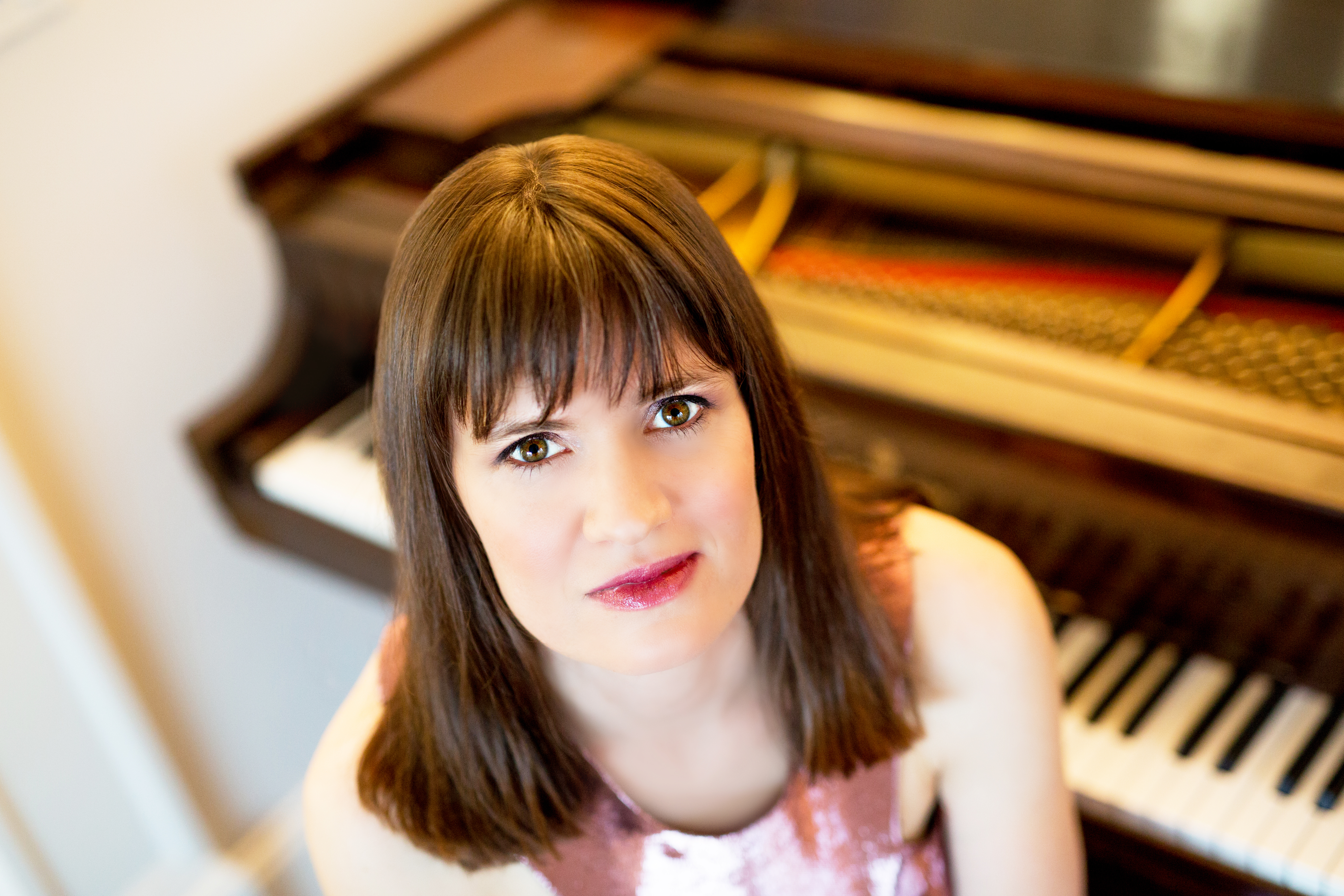
- Agócs in December 2015

Background information
- Born: January 20, 1975 (age 51)
- Origin: Windsor, Ontario, Canada
- Genre: Contemporary classical
- Occupation: Composer
- Website: www.katiagocs.com

Kati Ilona Agócs (born January 20, 1975) is a Canadian-American composer and a member of the composition faculty at the New England Conservatory of Music in Boston, Massachusetts.

== Education ==
Agócs attended the Juilliard School in New York where she earned a Master's and Doctoral degrees under the guidance of Milton Babbitt. She was a composition fellow at the Aspen Music Festival and School and the Tanglewood Music Center, where she held the ASCAP Leonard Bernstein Composer Fellowship in 2007. She was a voice student of Adele Addison.

== Career ==
From 2005 to 2006, she lived in Budapest and wrote on the new-music scene in Hungary for the journal The Musical Times. She had previously organized an exchange program between the Juilliard School and the Liszt Academy. The Hungarian-language weekly, Bécsi Napló (Vienna Journal) acknowledged her contribution to the visibility of Hungarian composers abroad. She served as Composer in Residence for the National Youth Orchestra of Canada in 2010.

Agócs was awarded a Guggenheim Fellowship in 2013. In 2014 the American Academy of Arts and Letters named her as recipient of the Arts and Letters Award in Music. She maintains a work studio in Flatrock, Newfoundland, Canada.

== Personal life ==
Agócs has one daughter, Olivia.

== Music ==
Boston Modern Orchestra Project recorded and released the 2016 album The Debrecen Passion, named one of the top 10 Classical albums of 2016 by the Boston Globe. The title track of this album was nominated in 2017 by the Canadian Academy of Recording Arts and Sciences for a Juno Award, Classical Composition of the Year.

In 2022, her Concerto for Violin and Percussion Orchestra was also nominated for Classical Composition of the Year.

Agócs has written on American music for the journal Tempo and also created a critical edition of the Symphony in A Major by Leopold Damrosch.

=== Select principal works ===
==== Solo and chamber works up to seven instruments ====
- Concerto for Violin and Percussion Orchestra (Solo violin and six percussionists) 2018. Recorded performance by violinist Nicholas Kitchen and the New England Conservatory Percussion Ensemble led by director Frank Epstein.
- Crystallography (Soprano, flute, clarinet, violin, cello, piano, and percussion) 2012 (Text: Christian Bök)
- Every Lover is a Warrior (Solo harp) 2005
- Hyacinth Curl (Two high voices and handbells) 2016
- Hymn (Saxophone quartet) 2005
- Immutable Dreams (Flute, clarinet, violin, cello, piano) 2006.
- Imprimatur (String Quartet No. 2) 2018
- In Spiritu (French horn, violin, piano) 2026
- Queen of Hearts (Piano Trio No. 1) 2017
- Rapprochement (String Quartet No. 3) 2025
- Voices of the Immaculate (Lyric mezzo-soprano, flute, clarinet, violin, cello, and piano/celeste) 2021 (Text: assembled by the composer: fragments from Revelations and testimony from survivors of abuse by clergy)

==== Orchestra / large ensemble works ====
- By the Streams of Babylon (Two amplified soprano voices and chamber orchestra) 2009 (Text: Psalm 137 in Latin)
- The Debrecen Passion (Twelve female voices and chamber orchestra) 2015 (Text: poems by Szilárd Borbély in Hungarian; Lamentations of Mary in modern Hungarian translation by Ferenc Molnár [fragments]; Ana B’Choach [in Hebrew]; Stabat Mater Specioso [fragments, in Latin]; Thou Art a Vineyard [hymn text in Georgian])
- Devotion (French horn, harp, and string orchestra) 2014, arranged from string quintet version
- Elysium (Chamber Orchestra and Recorded Sound)
- Horn Concerto (Solo Horn and Chamber Orchestra) 2021
- Hosanna of the Clouds (Solo Soprano, SATB Chorus, and Chamber Orchestra) 2025 (Text: Excerpts from Psalms 27 & 39 and Books of Luke, Isaiah, and Revelations in Latin; Prayer in Aramaic; Free verse in Latin and English)
- ..like treasure hidden in a field (Chamber Orchestra) 2010
- Perpetual Summer (Large Orchestra with Amplified and Processed Solo String Sextet) 2010; rev. 2012
- Requiem Fragments (Chamber Orchestra) 2008
- Shenanigan (Orchestra) 2011
- Transluminescence — Concerto for Piano and Orchestra (Solo Piano and Orchestra) 2022
