= Jorge Grossmann =

Peruvian composer, naturalized Brazilian

Jorge Villavicencio Grossmann (1973) is a Peruvian and Brazilian composer, who currently resides in the United States.

== Biography ==
Grossman was born in Lima to a Peruvian father and Brazilian mother of Austrian-Jewish descent. He began musical studies at the age of six, continuing to study the violin with Luis Fiestas and Veronique Daverio. In 1989, he and his family fled Peru for Brazil during the rise of the Maoist Shining Path.

In Brazil, he continued musical studies at Faculdade Santa Marcelina with Alberto Jaffe (a student of Max Rostal) and Ayrton Pinto (a former member of the Boston Symphony Orchestra). In 1998, he moved to the USA where he obtained a master's degree at Florida International University as a student of Fredrick Kaufman and, in 2004 he graduated with a Doctor of Musical Arts degree from Boston University as a student of John Harbison and Lukas Foss

His music has been performed world-wide by ensembles such as the Norwegian Radio Orchestra, National Symphony Orchestra of Ukraine, Peruvian National Symphony, New England Philharmonic, Aspen Sinfonia, Orquesta Uninorte (Paraguay), Kyiv Camerata, Nouvel Ensemble Moderne, Klangforum Wien, Boston Musica Viva, Da Capo Chamber Players, Seattle Chamber Players, Pierrot Lunaire Ensemble Wien, Talea Ensemble, JACK Quartet, Mivos Quartet, Borromeo String Quartet, among others.

His awards include a fellowship from the John Simon Guggenheim Memorial Foundation, the Jacob Druckman Award from the Aspen Music Festival, Aaron Copland Award, Charles Ives Scholarship from the American Academy of Arts and Letters, "Bolsa de Artes" by the Associacao Vitae (a fellowship of six months to a year, under which he composed his String Quartet no. 2). He was a Fulbright scholar in Spain in 2016.

He has been in residence at The MacDowell Colony, Atlantic Center for the Arts, and as guest composer in several festivals in the U.S. and abroad. He is a member of altaVoz a Latin American composers collective. From 2004 to 2010 he served as assistant professor of theory/composition at the University of Nevada, Las Vegas, where he co-founded and co-directed N.E.O.N., Nevada Encounters of New Music and directed NEXTET, UNLV's new music ensemble. Since 2010, he teaches composition at Ithaca College.

Grossmann's music began to draw inspiration from Peruvian themes once he relocated to Boston, as demonstrated by his works Pensar Geométrico al Trasluz, based on César Vallejo, and "Siray" (meaning "to weave" in Quechua). Other notable works include his three-movement solo violin piece La Ricerca della Spiritualità Trascendente, which takes inspiration from older models such as the flashy unaccompanied fiddle items of Bach and Bartok and his 2012 orchestral triptych "Anemoi", which was premiered at the Musical Premieres of the Season festival in Kyiv by the National Symphony Orchestra of Ukraine. Most recently Grossmann has begun to incorporate Peruvian indigenous instruments in compositions such as Whistling Vessels (2013).

== Works ==
=== Solo Instrumental ===
- Piano Sonata (1993)
- Prelude and Toccata for piano (1997)
- Prelude and Fugue for organ (1993–97)
- Omaggio a Berg for piano (1999)
- Alma for violín and electronics (2000)
- De Profundis for cello (2001)
- Mechanisms (Etudes I) for piano (2001)
- La Ricerca della Spiritualità Trascendente - for violin (2004-2005)
- Se Había Extinguido en Nosotros una Claridad for bassoon (2005)
- Sol Negro (Soleil Noir) for organ (2006)

=== Chamber music ===
- Eleusis for cello and piano (1994–97)
- Quadros de Dom Quixote for flute, clarinet, bassoon and horn (1998)
- Elegía Póstuma [in memoriam Alfonso de Silva] for alto sax and piano (1997)
- La Sombra es un Pedazo que se aleja for string quartet (1998)
- Reflejos for soprano voice, flute, violin, contrabass, marimba and vibraphone (1999)
- Dialogues and Monologues for oboe and piano (2000)
- Dialogues and Monologues for clarinet and piano (2000)
- Dialogues and Monologues II for bassoon and piano (2000)
- Mecanismos for flute, clarinet, violin, cello, piano and percussion (2001)
- Movement for string quartet (1999-2002)
- Hinterhof-szenenfor violin and piano (2002–03)
- String Quartet nº 1 (2002)
- String Quartet nº 2 ...a emaranhada forma humana corrupta da vida que muge e se aplaude (2003)
- " String Quartet nº 3" musica funebre y nocturna (2009)
- Siray for flute, clarinet, violin, cello, piano (2005)
- Pensar Geométrico al Trasluz for recorded (or flute), cello and percussion (2005)
- Trio for violin, horn and piano (2006-2011)
- Sialia for clarinet, cello and piano

=== Large Ensemble - Chamber Orchestra ===
- Partita Concertante for clarinet, harpsichord, contrabass, percussion and strings (2000)
- Away for 14 players (2003)
- Sinfonietta for 14 players and solo soprano (based on Away, text by Vicente Huidobro) (2004)

=== String Orchestra ===
- Pequena Suite (1993)
- Terpsychore Suite (1997)
- Concerto Elegiaco for piano and strings (2001-2006)

=== Symphony Orchestra ===
- La Leyenda Ayar (1997–98)
- Las Ruinas Circulares dance piece in four scenes (1998)
- Pasiphaë (2000–02, premiered in 2003).
- Valdrada (2008)
- Anemoi (2011-2012)
- Piano Concerto (2014)
- Gravitacoes (2016)

=== Vocal ===
- No more walks… (Hollander)
- Noche (Vicente Huidobro)
- Sombra de las Voces (Octavio Paz)
- Pequeño Responso (César Vallejo)

=== Choral ===
- Ave Maria (1989)
- O Quam Suavis (1997)
- The lower leaves of trees (2002)
- Yoshitada Songs SATB (2010)

=== Mixed Ensemble ===
- Aude Dictum narrator, violin and piano (2004)

== Awards ==
- Fulbright Scholar Program Grant
- Fromm Music Foundation Commission
- John Simon Guggenheim Memorial Foundation Fellowship
- Charles Ives Scholarship from the American Academy of Arts and Letters
- ALEA III International Composition Competition (finalist)
- Jacob Druckman Award from the Aspen Music Festival for Pasiphaë for orchestra.
- Honorable mention for Pasiphaë for orchestra: in the "Lepo Sumera" orchestral competition in Estonia.
- Winner of Boston University orchestral composition competition for Pasiphaë.
- "Bolsa de Artes" of Asociação Vitae, of São Paulo, Brasil.
- Artist Grant, St. Botolph Club Foundation Boston.
- Aaron Copland Award (2007)
