= Fredrick Kaufman =

American composer

Fedrick Kaufman
- Born: Fedrick Kaufman; March 24, 1936 (age 90); Brooklyn, New York
- Genres: Jazz
- Occupation: Composer
- Instrument: Trumpet

Fredrick Kaufman (born March 24, 1936) is an American composer.

== Before Fame ==
Kaufman was born in Brooklyn, New York and studied trumpet, composition and jazz at the Manhattan School of Music (BMus 1959, MMus 1960). In addition, he studied composition with Vincent Persichetti and Vittorio Giannini at the Juilliard School.

== Career ==
He played trumpet with the New York City Ballet Orchestra, taught at Yankton College and later became professor of composition at the University of Wisconsin. After serving as dean of the Philadelphia College for the Performing Arts from 1982 to 1985, and Professor of Music until 1993, he became the director of the School of Music at Florida International University in 1993 until 2008.

Kaufman is a former Fulbright Scholar and author of The African Roots of Jazz, a groundbreaking study that drew heavily on his early musical life as a jazz trumpet player with the Woody Herman Band. He is the recipient of the Darius Milhaud Award in Composition from the Aspen Music Festival, and honors and fellowships from the National Endowment for the Arts, the Rockefeller, Guggenheim and Ford Foundations, the California, Montana and Pennsylvania Arts Councils as well as the Norwegian government.

Fredrick Kaufman's Holocaust composition Kaddish has been performed in the major concert halls of Europe, Eastern Europe, Scandinavia, Israel, South America, Asia and throughout the United States.

His works have received prizes at international competitions and have been selected for performances at festivals such as the Aspen Music Festival, Telluride Chamber Music Festival, Music Festival of the Hamptons, Sarasota Music Festival, Israel Festival, Darmstadt Festival for New Music, International Arts Festival in Vilnius, Lithuania, and the St. Cyprien International Festival of the Arts in France.

Renowned artists such as Richard Stoltzman, Julius Baker, Susan Starr, Roy Malan, Mark Drobinsky, Andres Diaz, David Kim, Roberto Diaz, Yehuda Hanani, Charles Neidich, Kemal Gekic, Paul Green, Sarah Lambert Bloom, Martin Bookspan, The Miami String Quartet, The Amernet String Quartet, The Philadelphia String Quartet, The Windsor String Quartet, The Diaz Trio, and numerous others have recorded and performed Kaufman's concertos and chamber music. Additionally, Israeli television has paid tribute to him as a composer in the thirty-minute documentary film "Fredrick Kaufman-Life of an Artist".

In 1985, the Statue of Liberty committee commissioned Fredrick Kaufman to write a choral work Mother of Exiles, for the re-dedication ceremonies of the Statue of Liberty. The composition was premiered by the United Nations Chorus at the ceremony and was broadcast worldwide by network television. WE THE PEOPLE 200 of the City of Philadelphia commissioned Kaufman to write his fifth Symphony, "The American", in 1987 for the 200th anniversary celebration of the Constitution. Maestro Kaufman conducted the premiere performance which was nationally broadcast on NBC-TV. Over the past 15 years, Kaufman has been called upon repeatedly to conduct his compositions around the world.

In 1997, the Miami Herald voted Maestro Fredrick Kaufman one of the 10 most influential people in the arts in the city of Miami.

His latest multi-cultural works have received much critical acclaim by the press. His Kaminarimon (for Taiko drums and Flamenco dance) has been called "remarkable" and "stunning" and was voted as the number one classical composition of 2002 and "the most imaginative new work of the year" by, music critic, James Roos of The Miami Herald. His recently commissioned work Yin & Yang: A Dialogue for Two Grand Pianos, was launched and lauded by critics in New York and Miami, where it received its world premiere. String Quartet #6, "The Urban" was called "stunning" by New Yorker magazine.

In March, 2011, Fredrick Kaufman completed the "Guernica" Piano Concerto, a commission for the Czech National Symphony Orchestra and concert pianist Kemal Gekic. The "Guernica" Concerto was premiered and recorded in the 2013 concert season in Prague by the Czech National Symphony Orchestra at the famed Smetana Concert Hall. The "Guernica" Piano Concerto with Kemal Gekic and the Czech National Symphony Orchestra conducted by Maestro Marcello Rota; his "Kaddish" Cello Concerto with soloist Mark Drobinsky and the Czech Radio Orchestra, and "Seascape" performed by the Czech Symphony Orchestra was released on a CD recording entitled Guernica by Parma Recording and distributed internationally by Naxos during the summer of 2013. Maestro Max Valdez and the Puerto Rico Symphony Orchestra performed the "Guernica" Concerto with Kemal Gekic at the Casals Festival in Puerto Rico in 2015. Parma Records released a CD in 2106 entitled Stars & Distances featuring the title work performed by the Florida Grand Opera conducted by Maestro Andrew Bisantz, and the orchestra work Seven Sisters with performers from the Czech Philharmonic and Czech Symphony Orchestra.

== Personal life ==
Fredrick Kaufman currently resides with his artist wife Florence Kaufman in Miami. He has two daughters, Laura Ben Amots, an artist, and Erica Kaufman, a choreographer and dancer.

He holds the distinguished position of Professor Emeritus in Composition at Florida International University. Prior to that he held the position of Composer-in-Residence for the university, a position that was created specifically for him. Professor Kaufman was the founding Director of the FIU School of Music for ten years and established its internationally acclaimed FIU Music Festival. He was formerly Academic Dean of the Philadelphia College of the Performing Arts and a faculty member at the University of Wisconsin, the University of Montana at Billings, the University of London and the Rubin Academy of Music in Jerusalem, Israel. Kaufman is the founder and former Artistic Director of the St. Cyprien International Festival of the Arts held in St. Cyprien, France.
