= Anthony Cheung (composer) =

American composer (born 1982)

- Born: January 17, 1982 (age 44); San Francisco, California, U.S.

Academic background
- Education: Harvard University (AB); Columbia University (DMA)

Academic work
- Discipline: Music
- Sub-discipline: Musical composition Piano performance
- Institutions: University of Chicago; Brown University

Anthony Cheung (born January 17, 1982) is an American composer and a pianist.

== Early life and education ==
Cheung was born in San Francisco in 1982. He earned a Bachelor of Arts degree in music and history from Harvard University and a DMA in music from Columbia University.

== Career ==
Cheung composes a wide range of concert music, including solo and orchestral works. His works have been commissioned by Ensemble Modern, Ensemble Intercontemporain, and the Cleveland Orchestra, among others. He won a Guggenheim Fellowship in 2016, the Rome Prize in 2013, and first prize in the Sixth International Dutilleux Competition (2008).

Cheung was the co-director of the Grossman Ensemble at the University of Chicago. He is an associate professor of music at Brown University.
