= Joan Catoni Conlon =

Professor of choral music

Joan C. Conlon
- Born: Joan Catoni

Academic background
- Education: University of Washington
- Thesis: Stylistic variation and virtuosity in the choral music of Georg Philipp Telemann as represented by the unpublished cantata Wertes Zion, sei getrost (1975)

Joan Catoni Conlon is Professor and Director of Graduate Choral Research Emerita for the University of Colorado at Boulder, where she conducted the University Singers. She received her BA, MA and DMA degrees from the University of Washington where she was Professor of Choral Music and Conducting (1972–95). From 1971 to 1995 she was the conductor of the Northwest Chamber Chorus in Seattle, Washington, and was the chair of the Research and Publications Committee of the American Choral Directors Association. Her scholarship specializes in the choral music of Georg Philipp Telemann and Claudio Monteverdi. She published Performing Monteverdi: A Conductor’s Guide (ISBN 0-937276-27-8). She has also studied the Hindustani classical vocal music of India. In 2009 she edited and contributed to 'Wisdom, Wit and Will: Women Choral Conductors On their Art' [ISBN 978-1579997601.] -- a collection of essays relating to conducting choral literature and professional development.

== Career ==
Conlon began singing as an alto with the Northwest Chamber Chorus in 1968 while she was studying choral music at the University of Washington. She was group's director from 1971 until 1995. Conlon's sabbatical in 1983 examined Indian vocal traditions and learned new vocal pieces.

Conlon moved to the University of Colorado at Boulder in 1995.

== Selected publications ==
- Conlon, Joan C. (2001). Performing Monteverdi. Hinshaw Music. ISBN 978-0-937276-27-3.
- Conlon, Joan Catoni, ed. (2009). Wisdom, Wit, and Will. GIA Publications. ISBN 978-1-57999-760-1.

== Honors and awards ==
In 1998 Conlon was in the first group of people elected to the hall of fame for the Washington Music Educators Association. Conlon was named an honorary life member of the National Collegiate Choral Organization.
