= Song cycles (Waterhouse) =

Song cycles by Waterhouse

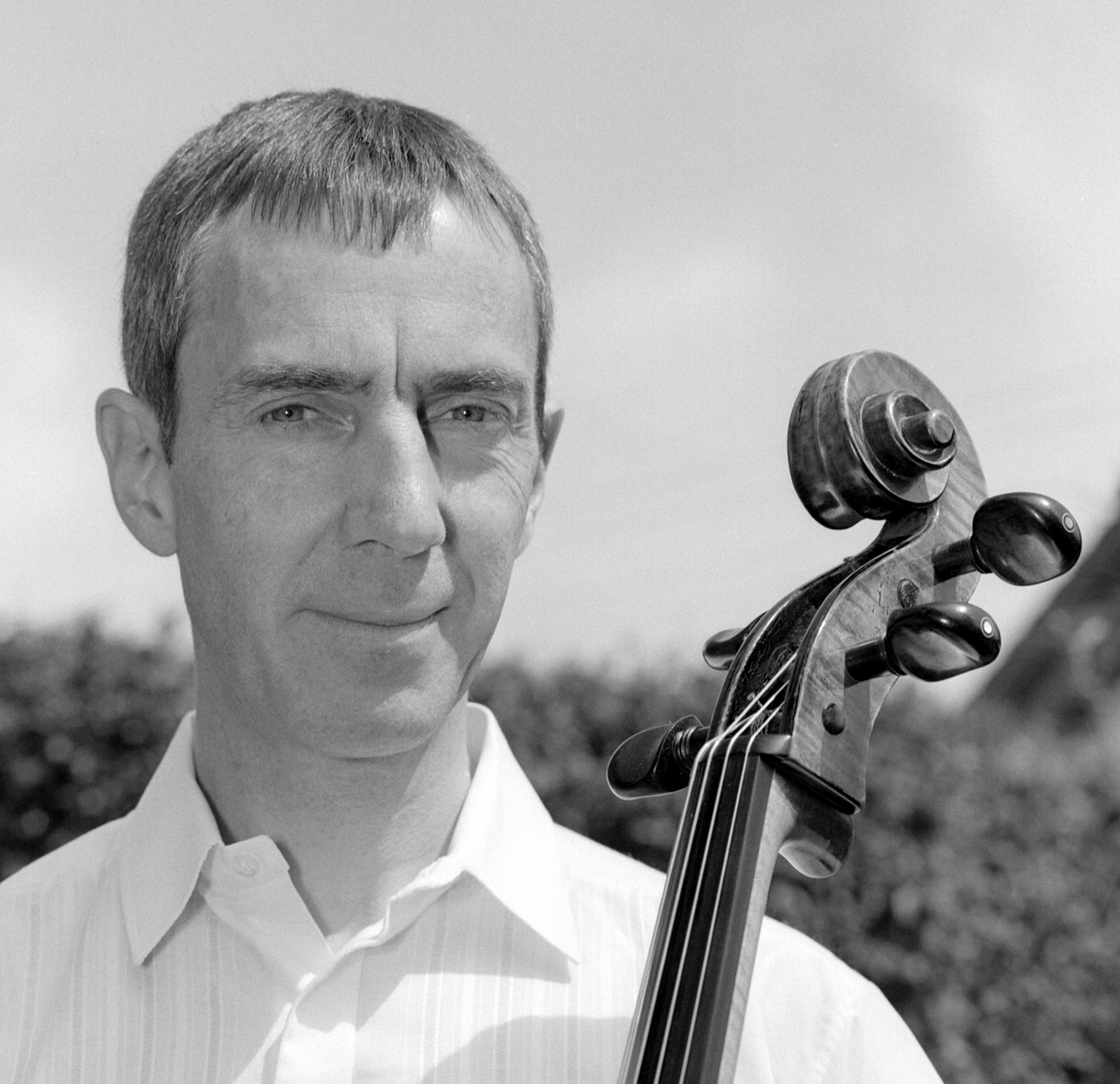
Graham Waterhouse in 2011

Graham Waterhouse, cellist and composer especially of chamber music, has written a number of song cycles. As a cellist, he has used string instruments or a Pierrot ensemble instead of the typical piano to accompany a singer. In 2003 he composed a first cycle of songs based on late poems by Friedrich Hölderlin. In 2016, he set nursery rhymes, excerpts from James Joyce, and texts by Shakespeare. In 2017, he wrote settings of poems by Irish female writers, and in 2022 a cycle of Buddhist texts for mezzo-soprano, cello and piano.

== Overview ==
The following table contains for every song cycle the title with translation, the year of composition, the text source and its language(s), voice type (soprano, mezzo-soprano, tenor) and instrument or ensemble, and the number of movements. When ensemble is mentioned, it is always the Pierrot ensemble which Arnold Schoenberg introduced in his Pierrot Lunaire of 1912: flute, clarinet, violin, cello, piano and percussion.

Song cycles by Graham Waterhouse
Title	Translation	Year	Text source	Language	Voice	Instrument(s)	Movements
Sechs späteste Lieder	Six latest songs	2003	Hölderlin	German	mezzo-soprano	cello	7
Moonbass		2014	medieval poems	French; English; German	soprano	cello	3
De Natura	Of nature	2015	poems about nature	English	tenor	string quartet	5
Hinx Minx		2016	nursery rhymes	English	mezzo-soprano	cello	6
Music of Sighs		2016	James Joyce	English	mezzo-soprano	ensemble	3
Drei Lieder nach Shakespeare	Three Songs After Shakespeare	2016	Shakespeare	English	soprano	string quartet	3
Irish Phoenix		2017	Irish female writers	English	soprano	ensemble	7
Shravana		2022	Buddhist texts	Sanskrit	mezzo-soprano	cello and piano	5

=== Sechs späteste Lieder ===
Sechs späteste Lieder
- Based on: Poems by Hölderlin
- Performed: 11 April 2010
- Movements: 7
- Scoring: Mezzo-soprano; cello

The cycle, composed in 2003, sets six of the late poems by Hölderlin for mezzo-soprano voice and cello in seven movements, with a prelude by the cello, and the final poem spoken as a melodrama:

1. Vorspiel (Cello)
2. Das Angenehme dieser Welt
3. Nicht alle Tage
4. Der Winter
5. Die Aussicht
6. Der Herbst
7. Auf den Tod eines Kindes

It was performed and live recorded at the Gasteig in Munich by Martina Koppelstetter and the composer on 11 April 2010, in a composer's portrait concert, along with chamber music, early songs and the premiere of the setting of the poem Im Gebirg (On the Mountains) by Hans Krieger, scored for mezzo-soprano, alto flute and piano.

=== Moonbass ===
Moonbass
- Text: Medieval poems
- Performed: 28 November 2014
- Movements: 3
- Scoring: Soprano; cello

The cycle is a setting of three medieval poems in different languages, for soprano and cello. It was composed for a colloquium at the University of Oldenburg with Violeta Dinescu.

1. He Lune! (Christine de Pisan, 1365–1430)
2. Man in the Moon (anon., translated from Old English by J. Draycott)
3. Der Tunkel Sterne (Der von Kürenberg, c. 1150–1170)

It was premiered on 28 November 2014 by Stephanie Kühne and the composer.

=== De Natura ===
De Natura
- Text: Poems about nature
- Performed: 1 November 2015
- Movements: 5
- Scoring: Tenor; string quartet

De Natura (Of Nature) is a song cycle for tenor and string quartet. The texts have in common that they deal with phenomena of nature.

1. Hymn to Helios (anon., 1st century BC)
2. The Moon (Charles Best, 1608)
3. On a Nightingale in April (William Sharp, c. 1890)
4. The Amphisbaena (A. E. Housman, c. 1920)
5. Saint Hugh (Thomas Dekker, c. 1630)

It was premiered at the Gasteig on 1 November 2015 by tenor Colin Howard and a string quartet formed by Joe Rappaport, Lorenz Chen, Dorothea Galler and the composer.

=== Hinx Minx ===
Hinx Minx
- Based on: Nursery rhymes
- Performed: 28 February 2016
- Movements: 6
- Scoring: Mezzo-soprano; cello

The cycle of settings of six nursery rhymes from the Oxford Dictionary of Nursery Rhymes was composed for a concert for children on the Museumsinsel Hombroich, performed on 28 February 2016 by Eva Vogel, mezzo-soprano, and the composer as the cellist.

1. Sing, sing
2. Anna Elise
3. Hector Protector
4. Hinx, Minx
5. Solomon Grundy
6. Chinese counting

=== Music of Sighs ===
Music of Sighs
- Text: by James Joyce
- Performed: 24 April 2016
- Movements: 3
- Scoring: Mezzo-soprano; ensemble

The texts for the cycle are all by James Joyce; Arise from Chamber Music (No. 14) is framed by two excerpt from Finnegans Wake:

1. Bulbulone
2. Arise
3. Buzzard

Scored for mezzo-soprano and ensemble, the cycle was first performed at the Gasteig on 24 April 2016 by Julia Kraushaar and the Ensemble Blauer Reiter.

=== Drei Lieder nach Shakespeare ===
Drei Lieder nach Shakespeare
- Text: Songs from Shakespeare's The Tempest
- Performed: 9 November 2016
- Movements: 3
- Scoring: Soprano; string quartet

Waterhouse set three songs by Shakespeare from his play The Tempest for soprano and string quartet, to be first performed in an homage concert for Shakespeare, ... play fast and loose ..., at the Gasteig on 9 October 2016 by Anna Karmasin and the Pelaar Quartet:

1. Say my Spirit
2. Where the Bee sucks
3. Juno and Ceres

=== Irish Phoenix ===
Irish Phoenix
- Text: poems by Irish women
- Performed: 1 April 2017
- Movements: 8
- Scoring: Soprano; ensemble

The cycle is based on poems by Irish women writers from the 8th to the 21st century. It is scored for soprano and an instrumental ensemble matching Anton Webern's arrangement of Schoenberg's first Chamber Symphony, Op. 9: flute (doubling piccolo), clarinet (doubling bass clarinet), violin, cello, piano and percussion. Settings of seven poems and an interlude form the cycle:

1. Eve (anon, 8th century)
2. News (Colette Nic Aodha)
3. The Spring (Katharine Tynan)
4. Song (Rebecca Scott, 1870)
5. Interlude
6. Small Breaths (Eileen Hulme, 1990)
7. The Poetry Bug (Colette Bryce, early 21st century)
8. The Irish Phoenix (anon, 18th century)

It was first performed by Anna Karmasin and the ensemble Blauer Reiter at the Gasteig on 1 April 2017.

=== Shravana ===
Shravana
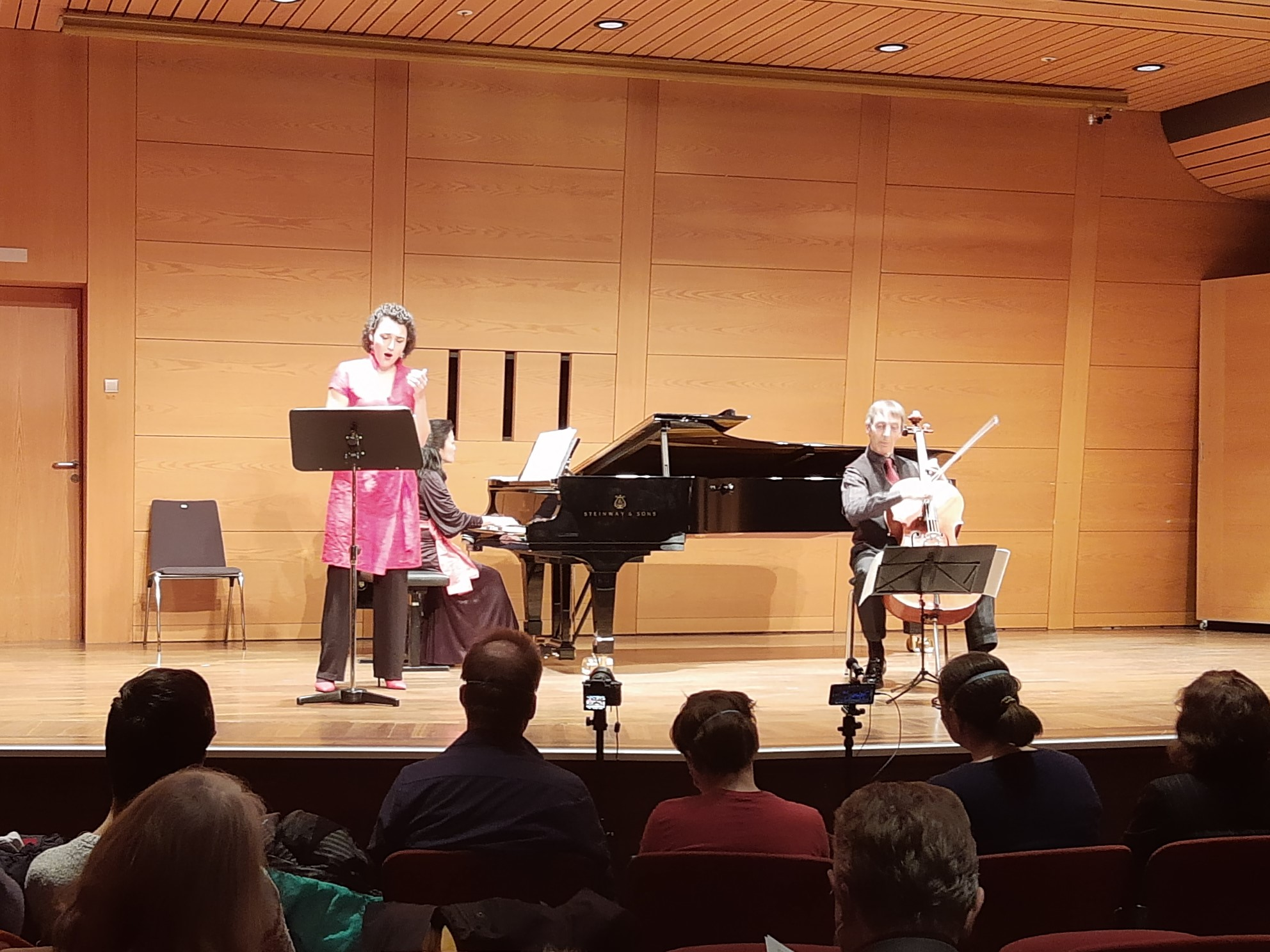
- Premiere at the Gasteig
- Based on: Buddhist texts
- Performed: 12 March 2022
- Movements: 5
- Scoring: Soprano; cello; piano

The cycle Shravana for mezzo-soprano, cello and piano is music in five movements for different combinations of the three performers, all with Buddhist overtones.

1. Gate Paragate
2. Om Tare
3. Vajrakilaya
4. Vokalise
5. Vaidurya

It was first performed at the Gasteig on 12 March 2022 by Anna-Doris Capitelli, the composer and Miku Nishimoto-Neubert.
