= Carolyn Yarnell =

American classical composer

Carolyn Yarnell (born 1961) is an American composer and visual artist. A recipient of the Rome Prize, Charles Ives Prize, and a Guggenheim Fellowship, she is particularly noted for works which combine visual and musical depictions of landscape and light, many of which were inspired by the landscapes of her native California.

== Background ==
Yarnell grew up in the Sierra Nevada region of California. She studied composition at the San Francisco Conservatory of Music where she received a Bachelor of Music in 1986 and at Yale University where she received her master's degree in 1989. Two years later the final two movements of her five-movement Symphony No. 1, Enemy Moon and Exit, commissioned by the Tanglewood Music Center, had their world premiere at Tanglewood's Festival of Contemporary Music. Yarnell is a long-time member of the Common Sense Composers Collective who via collaborations with groups such as the New Millennium and American Baroque ensembles have premiered many contemporary works by their members and other composers. The collective has produced several CDs including TIC (2007) and The Shock of the Old (2002). The latter featured contemporary compositions played on baroque period instruments.

== Selected works ==
- The Same Sky, for piano, electronics and video projection (2000)
- Symphony No. 1.
- Mean Harp, for solo piano
- Living Mountains, tone poem for orchestra
- Lapis Lazuli, chamber music
- Yosemite and the Range of Light, multi-movement orchestral work
- Film score for La Souriante Madame Beudet (1927 silent film by Germaine Dulac)

== Recordings ==
- The Shock of the Old – Common Sense Composers Collective and the American Baroque Ensemble, works by Marc Mellits, Belinda Reynolds, Ed Harsh, Randall Woolf, Dan Becker, Carolyn Yarnell, John Halle and Melissa Hui (2002). Label: Santa Fe New Music
- Sonic Vision – works by Carolyn Yarnell (2003). Label: Tzadik
- Kathy Supové: Infusion – contemporary piano works by Marti Epstein, Elaine Kaplinsky, Randall Woolf, and Carolyn Yarnell (2004). Label: Koch International Classics
- TIC – Common Sense Composers Collective and the New Millenium Ensemble, works by Marc Mellits, Belinda Reynolds, Ed Harsh, Randall Woolf, Dan Becker, Carolyn Yarnell and John Halle (2007). Label: Albany Records

== Sources ==
- Burns, Kristine Helen (2002). Women and music in America since 1900: An encyclopedia, Volume 1. Greenwood Press. ISBN 1-57356-308-0
- Dalton, Joseph (June 2, 2007). "Perlman remains a giant among violinists". Albany Times Union. Albany, NY. Archived from the original on November 5, 2012 – via HighBeam Research.
- Dalton, Joseph (November 14, 2007). "Composer in tune to her life as vagabond". Albany Times Union. Albany, NY. Archived from the original on November 5, 2012 – via HighBeam Research.
- Dyer, Richard (August 9, 1991). "Tanglewood festival ends on a high note". The Boston Globe. Boston, MA. Archived from the original on November 5, 2012 – via HighBeam Research.
- Hastie, Amelie and Stamp, Shelley (2006). "Women and the Silent Screen: Cultural and Historical Practices", Film History: An International Journal, Vol. 18, No. 2, 2006, pp. 107–109 (subscription required)
- Kosman, Joshua (2002). "New music, old instruments". San Francisco Chronicle, June 30, 2002
- WNYC (August 11, 2009). Evening Music: Lapis Lazuli by Carolyn Yarnell
- Holland, Bernard (1993). "Classical Music in Review: American Composers Orchestra Carnegie Hall". The New York Times, June 22, 1993
- Holland, Bernard (1994) "Detonations of Sound, Here, There and Everywhere – Kathleen Supove, Pianist Roulette". The New York Times, December 21, 1994
