= Xi Wang =

Chinese composer

Xi Wang (Chinese: 奚望; pinyin: Xī Wàng; born 1978) is a Chinese composer based in the United States. A 2024 Guggenheim Fellow, she is Professor of Music Composition and Theory at the Meadows School of the Arts.

== Biography ==
Xi Wang was born in 1978 in China. She began studying music when she was five, eventually culminating in her admission to the Shanghai Conservatory of Music, where she obtained her Bachelor of Music degree. In 2001, she emigrated to the United States, where she obtained her Master of Music degree at the University of Missouri–Kansas City, and she continued her graduate studies at Cornell University, where she obtained her Doctor of Musical Arts degree and won the 2006–2007 Robbins Family Prize in Music Composition. In 2009, she became part of the faculty of Southern Methodist University, where she eventually became Professor of Music Composition and Theory at the Meadows School of the Arts.

In addition to teaching, she also works as a composer and pianist, with her genre being Asian-Western fusion music. In 2015, her composition Tibet Fantasia, one of many inspired by Tibetan music, premiered at Dallas City Performance Hall with the cooperation of local music ensemble Voices of Change. Another composition, Year 2020 (2024), was inspired by the COVID-19 pandemic. She also works as a conductor for composition premieres, including on her own works.

In 2011, she was a MacDowell Colony Fellow in Music Composition. She won the 2012 Charles Ives Fellowship. In 2024, she was appointed a Guggenheim Fellow; she later announced that she would study Tibetan culture and music as part of a research trip there as part of the Fellowship.

Xi is based in the Dallas–Fort Worth metroplex. Xi prefers the Chinese tradition of placing the surname before the given name.
