= Evan Chambers =

American classical composer (born 1963)

- Born: 1963 (age 62–63); Alexandria, Louisiana, U.S.
- Education: University of Michigan (DMA)
- Occupations: Composer; traditional Irish fiddler; professor
- Employer: University of Michigan
- Notable work: The Old Burying Ground

Evan Chambers (born 1963, in Alexandria, Louisiana) is a composer, traditional Irish fiddler, and Professor of Composition at the University of Michigan. He received a Doctorate in music composition from the University of Michigan. His teachers include William Albright for whose Requiem he composed Lament, Leslie Bassett, Nicholas Thorne, and Marilyn Shrude, with studies in electronic music with George Wilson and Burton Beerman. He is a member of the Lindisfarne Association.

Chambers' compositions are deeply rooted in folk music, his own spirituality, and a keen comprehension of musical gesture and form. His works for large ensemble include The Old Burying Ground for soprano, tenor, folksinger and orchestra, Concerto for Fiddle and Violin for Irish fiddler, violin soloist, and orchestra; Three Islands for orchestra; The Tall-Eared Fox and the Wild-Eyed Man for string orchestra; and Polka Nation for wind ensemble. His chamber music includes Come Down Heavy, Cold Water, Dry Stone and Crazed for the Flame. His electronic music compositions include Rothko-Tobey Continuum for violin and tape and Cell Phone Java Bodhi Svaha, with video by Andy Kirshner based on Buddhist-themed poetry by Chambers.

Chambers' music has been recorded on the compact disks The Old Burying Ground (Dorian Sono Luminus DSL-92113), Cold Water, Dry Stone (Albany, Troy 422), Brutal Reality (Albany, Troy 354), Simple Requests (Cambria CD-1088), "Collaborations" (Equilibrium CD-66), Alternating Currents (Centaur CRC 2492) and "Beyond the Red Line" (Mark Custom MCD-6537).

In 2021, when University of Michigan composition faculty member Bright Sheng screened 90 minutes of Laurence Olivier's blackface performance of Othello for his undergraduate seminar without context or discussion, the students petitioned for his removal from the class and Evan Chambers gave the following quote to the campus newspaper: “To show the film now, especially without substantial framing, content advisory and a focus on its inherent racism is in itself a racist act, regardless of the professor’s intentions. We need to acknowledge that as a community.”

== Sources ==
- Homepage (New)
- Homepage (old)
- Interview
