= Randall Woolf =

American composer (born 1959)

Randall Woolf (born August 23, 1959) is an American composer known for his diverse contemporary works for chamber orchestra, chamber ensembles, and solo players, often combined with digital audio, turntables, and video. He studied composition privately with David Del Tredici and Joseph Maneri, and at Harvard, where he earned a Ph.D. He is a member of the Common Sense Composers Collective. He is composer-mentor of the Brooklyn Philharmonic. In 1997, he composed a ballet version of Where the Wild Things Are in collaboration with Maurice Sendak and Septime Webre. He created three pieces for video and live instruments with directors Mary Harron (director of “American Psycho”) and John C. Walsh. He has worked frequently with John Cale, notably on his score of American Psycho. He re-created four of Nico’s songs for Cale’s tribute concert “On the Borderline”, sung by Peter Murphy, Lisa Gerrard, Sparklehorse, Stephin Merritt, Peaches, and Meshell Ndegeocello. He arranged over 40 of Cale's songs for orchestra, including the entire Paris 1919 album (performed at the Brooklyn Academy of Music in January 2013), songs from The Velvet Underground and Nico, and "Music for a New Society". His works have been performed by Kathleen Supové, Jennifer Choi, Timothy Fain, Mary Rowell, Todd Reynolds, Ethel, conductor/flutist Ransom Wilson, Tara O’Connor, Lindsey Goodman, the Brooklyn Philharmonic, the Kronos Quartet, Turnmusic, Fulcrum Point, the Pittsburgh New Music Ensemble, Sonic Generator, Bang on a Can/SPIT Orchestra, the American Composers Orchestra, NakedEye Ensemble, and others.

Recordings and scores of most of Woolf's music are on his website, randallwoolf.com. His complete flute music is on http://flutterbyrandallwoolf.com/, an alluvial by CCA. An alluvial is a music streaming website, organized around a theme, like an album.

Woolf's orchestral work White Heat was commissioned by and premiered at the Tanglewood Music Center in 1989.
