= William Albright (musician) =

American composer, pianist and organist

William Hugh Albright (October 20, 1944 – September 17, 1998) was an American composer, pianist and organist.

== Biography ==
Albright was born in Gary, Indiana, and began learning the piano at the age of five. When Albright was in junior high, his family decided to move to West Orange, New Jersey. There, Albright started studying with Rosetta Goodkind and composition with Hugh Aitken through the Juilliard Preparatory Department.He attended the Juilliard Preparatory Department (1959–62), the Eastman School of Music (1962–63) and the University of Michigan (1962–70), where he studied composition with Ross Lee Finney and George Rochberg, and organ with Marilyn Mason. He interrupted his studies for the 1968–69 academic year when he received a Fulbright scholarship to study with Olivier Messiaen in Paris. Upon his graduation in 1970 he was appointed to the faculty of the University of Michigan, where he taught composition and directed the electronic music studio until his death from liver failure in Ann Arbor, Michigan, in 1998.

== Career ==
His music combined elements of tonal and non-tonal classical music (in particular the influence of Messiaen) with American popular music and non-Western music, in what has been described as "polystylistic" or "quaquaversal" music—which makes the definition of an overall style difficult. Albright's approach to some of his music has been considered to be surrealistic. He was an enthusiast for ragtime and made notable recordings of the piano rags of Scott Joplin and others. He also recorded an album of his own ragtime compositions.

In addition to his compositional and teaching activities, Albright maintained an active career and was regarded as both a virtuoso organist and pianist, performing many recitals on both instruments throughout North American and Europe. He was the featured organist for the 1976 International Contemporary Organ Music Festival at the Hartt School of Music. He had earlier been commissioned to write his organ work Stipendium Peccati for the 1973 International Contemporary Organ Music Festival. He commissioned new works for the organ from other contemporary composers to play on his international concert tours. His hymns appear in hymnals of the Unitarian and Episcopal Churches.

Albright's notable students include Derek Bermel, John Burke, Evan Chambers, Chihchun Chi-sun Lee, Gabriela Lena Frank, Alexander Frey, Evan Hause, John Howell Morrison, Carter Pann, Frank Ticheli, and Michael Sidney Timpson.

== Honors ==
- Two Fulbright fellowships
- Two Guggenheim Fellowships
- Niagara University's Symphonic Composition Award
- Two National Endowment for the Arts Grants
- Two Koussevitzky Commissions
- Composer-In-Residence at the American Academy in Rome, 1979
- Queen Marie-Jose Prize
- American Academy of Arts and Letters
- University of Michigan's Distinguished Service Award and Faculty Recognition Award.

== Selected Compositions ==
- Three Novelty Rags
- Alliance
- Stipendium Peccati
- Bacchanal
- Organbook I and II, for organ and tape
- Sonata, for alto saxophone and piano
- Chasm, for organ. Commissioned by the Ann Arbor and Detroit chapters of the American Guild of Organists for the 1986 AGO National Convention in Ann Arbor, premiered by Marilyn Mason.
