= Richard Festinger =

American composer

Richard Festinger (born 1 March 1948) is an American composer of contemporary classical music, pianist and educator.

== Biography ==
Festinger was born in Newton, Massachusetts. He received his B.A. in music, magna cum laude, from San Francisco State University, and his Ph.D. in music composition from the University of California, Berkeley. He was the founding director of Earplay, a new chamber music ensemble based in the Bay Area. He has been a resident artist at the MacDowell Colony, Camargo Foundation, Cité internationale des arts in Paris, Yaddo, the Virginia Center for the Creative Arts, the Rockefeller Foundation Bellagio Study Center, the Ligurian Study Center in Bogliasco, Italy, Fundación Valparaíso, Mojácar, Almeria, Spain, Ucross Foundation Centre International d’Accueil et d’Échanges des Récollets, the Aaron Copland House, the Oberpfälzer Künstlerhaus, and the Central Conservatory of Music in Beijing. He was commissioned by the Fromm Foundation in 2003 to compose his work Hidden Spring for the Cygnus Ensemble. Also in 2003 Works and Process at the Guggenheim commissioned and premiered his settings of poet/author Denis Johnson, The Coming of Age with Amy Burton, soprano and The Group for Contemporary Music conducted by Bradley Lubman. In 2009 pianist Marilyn Nonken toured with Festinger's large scale piano solo, Le Pianiste.

Early in his career Festinger played guitar and toured with folk singer Joan Baez including a performance at Woodstock. Shortly afterwards, intent on pursuing a performing career in jazz, he attended the Berklee School of Music in Boston, where he studied composition with Herb Pomeroy and improvisation with Gary Burton. Returning to San Francisco in 1972 he performed extensively for several years as a jazz guitarist while pursuing a growing interest in classical music and composition. Festinger earned his B.A. from San Francisco State and later his M.A. and Ph.D. from the University of California, Berkeley where he worked with Andrew Imbrie. Festinger is Professor of Theory and Composition at San Francisco State University, where he is also the artistic director of the Morrison Artists Chamber Music Series.

== Compositions ==
- Incognito (2014) text: Emily Dickinson, soprano and baritone
- Winds of May (2014) text: James Joyce, soprano and two classical guitars
- Love Wanders There (2013) text: James Joyce, soprano and two classical guitars
- Kleinen Doch Emsigen (2013) flute, clarinet, viola, cello
- Portrait(2012) unaccompanied violin
- Violacanta (2012) unaccompanied viola
- Upon The Viol (2012) unaccompanied cello
- To a Pilgrim (2011) bass clarinet and cello
- Spring Ice (2010) soprano and violin, on 12th-century Japanese poems
- Enchainement (2009) for solo viola
- Le Pianiste (2009) solo piano three pieces after paintings of Roberto Matta
- Equinox (2009) for clarinet and small orchestra
- Legerdemain (2008) solo percussion, hand drums
- Insect Voices (2008) soprano and four players
- The Locust Tree (2007) chorus-SATB (text William Carlos Williams)
- Concerto for Piano and Nine Instruments (2007)
- Between Thought and Thing (2006) for eight players
- The Way Things Go (2006) flute, piano
- From The Beginning (2005) String Quartet No. 2
- A Machine for Interpreting Dreams (2005) for four players
- Hidden Spring (2004) for six players
- Laws of Motion (2004) for five players
- Diary of a Journey (2003) for six players
- The Coming of Age (2003) text: Denis Johnson soprano and six players
- a dream foretold (2001) for four players
- Construction in Metal and Wood (2001) percussion and piano
- Crossfire (2000) two percussion
- Peripeteia (1999) clarinet, violin and cello
- On the Lightness of the Moon (1998) clarinet, violin, viola and piano
- After Blue (1998) flute, clarinet, violin, cello, piano and percussion, 1998
- Dajunso Ma Dor Da Duca (1997) nine-part chorus
- Tapestries (1997) violin, cello and piano, 1997
- Windsongs (1996) flute, oboe, clarinet, bassoon, horn
- Trionometry (1996) flute, clarinet and piano, 1996
- Violuminescence (1995) violin solo and chamber orchestra, 1995
- Twinning (1994) violin and piano, 1994
- String Quartet No.1 (1994)
- A Serenade for Six (1993) flute, clarinet, violin, cello, piano and percussion
- Smokin' with Cocuswood (1992) oboe, string quartet and piano
- Head over Heels (1992) solo electronic keyboard with computer
- Three Little Piano Pieces (1992)
- Octet (1991) – flute, oboe, clarinet, horn, violin, viola, cello and piano
- Sonata for Cello and Piano (1990)
- Variations for Piano (1988)
- Septet (1987) – flute, clarinet, violin, viola, cello, piano and percussion
- Impromptu (1985) clarinet and piano
- Letters and the Weather of Six Mornings (1984) soprano and piano
- Paysages Modernes (1983) large orchestra
- Song: Beauty is a Shell from the Sea (1981) SATB with flute, oboe, bass clarinet, horn, string quartet, harp and guitar
- Concerto for Piano and Orchestra (1980)
- Triptych (1979) solo flute
- Matin (1978) CD
- Ontogenesis (1978) flute, clarinet, violin, cello and piano
- Avian Landscapes (1987) CD
- In Delirium of Sunrise (1977) string quartet
- Cheville (1976) large orchestra
- Divertimento (1976) oboe, clarinet, violin and cello
- Movements for Guitar (1976)
- Prelude for Guitar (1971)

== Recordings ==
- Music of Richard Festinger. New Millenium Ensemble. Bridge Records 9245
- Richard Festinger: Tapestries and Other Works. Laurel Trio, Earplay, Curtis Macomber. New World/CRI NWCR832
- A Serenade for Six. New Millenium Ensemble. New World/CRI NWCR772
- Septet, the Earplay ensemble, Centaur CD 2274
- Triptych, Samuel Baron, flute, Contemporary Recording Studios vinyl LP CRS 8738
- Various tracks, Joan Baez, One Day at a Time, Vanguard Records
- Live at Pangaea, volumes I and II, Independent Records, San Rafael, CA, vinyl LPs
