= Andy Kirshner =

Andy Kirshner is an American writer, director, and composer.

He is professor emeritus at the University of Michigan, in both the Stamps School of Art and Design and the School of Music, Theatre & Dance, where he taught for 25 years. His interdisciplinary body of work uses film, theatre, music, scholarship to explore complex social, political, and historical questions, and has been supported by the National Endowment for the Arts, the Michigan Council on the Arts and Cultural Affairs, and many others. Kirshner has written, directed, and composed three feature films: a musical satire of American politics, Liberty's Secret (2016), and Manufacturing Hate: 10 Questions for Henry Ford (2021), a documentary-drama about the legacy of Henry Ford's antisemitic publications, and Sex Radical (2025), about the 19th-century feminist, Ida Craddock, and her battle against the censorship regime of Anthony Comstock. Kirshner's earlier works include The Museum of Life and Death, a 25th-century, post-human morality play based on the medieval play, Everyman; An Evening with Tony Amore, a musical tragic-comedy for jazz crooner and full orchestra inspired by the mythos of Frank Sinatra; Who It Is, a one-man musical about race and nationalism; and Dr. Nathan Feelgood In Person, an operetta for 10-piece blues band and a singing psychiatrist.

Kirshner holds a doctorate in Music Composition from the University of Michigan, where his principal teacher was William Bolcom. He also studied composition with T.J. Anderson. He has a degree in saxophone performance from the New England Conservatory of Music, and a degree in philosophy from Tufts University.
