= Árpád (given name) =

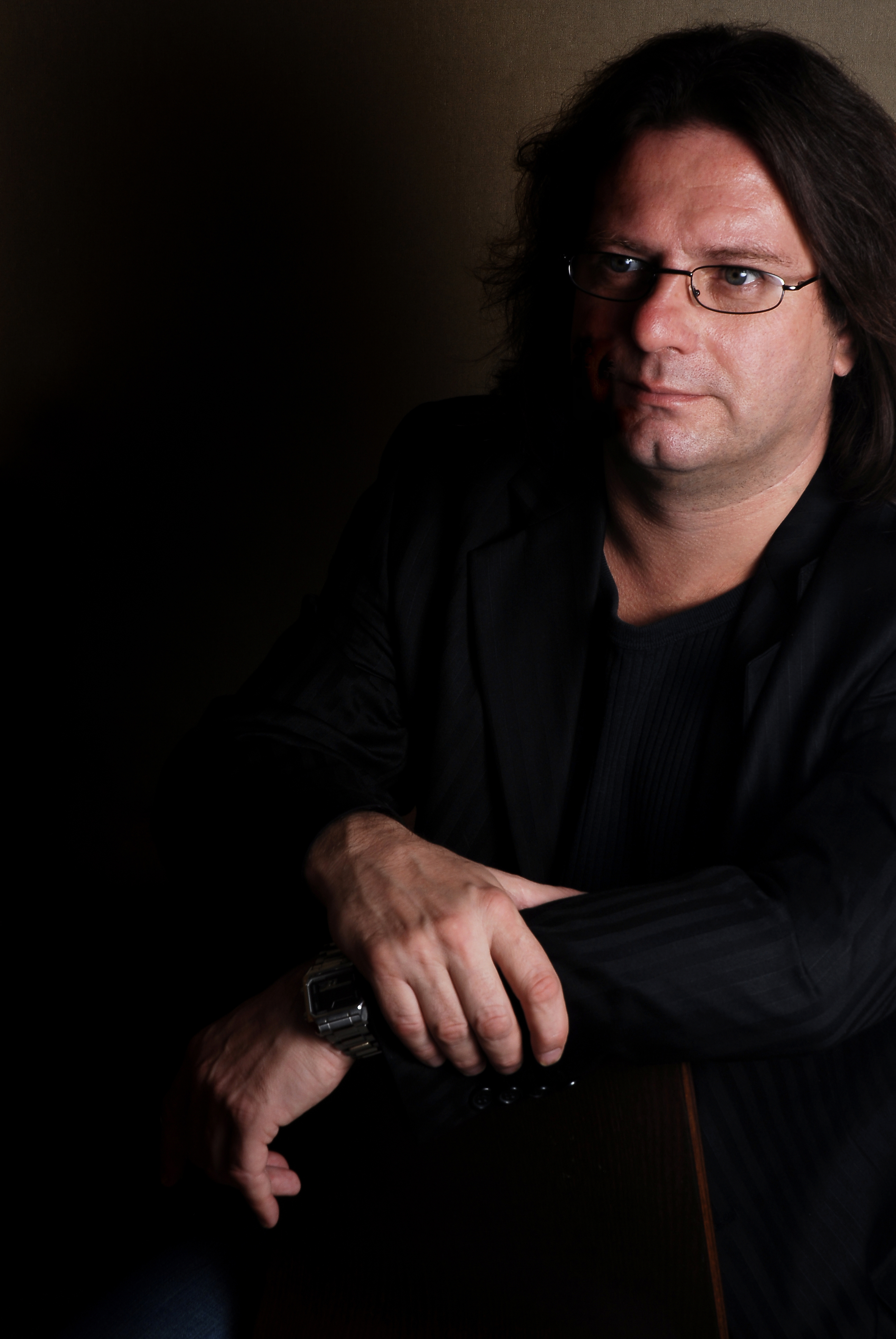
Barabás Árpád

Arpad or Árpád (Hungarian pronunciation: [ˈaːrpaːd]) is a Hungarian masculine given name. Notable people with the name include:

- Árpád Ambrusz (born 1980), Hungarian football player
- Árpád Balázs (born 1937), Hungarian classical music composer
- Árpád Bárány (born 1931), Hungarian Olympic fencer
- Árpád Basch (1873–1944), Hungarian painter and graphic artist
- Arpad Busson (born 1963), French financier and London-based socialite
- Árpád Bogsch (1919–2004), Hungarian turned American international civil servant
- Arpad Darazs (1922–1986), Hungarian-American music educator
- Árpád Doppler (1857–1927), Hungarian-German composer
- Árpád Duka-Zólyomi (born 1941), Slovak politician and Member of the European Parliament
- Arpad Elo (1903–1992), the creator of the Elo rating system for two-player games such as chess
- Árpád Feszty (1856–1914), Hungarian painter
- Árpád Göncz (born 1922), Hungarian liberal politician and former President of Hungary
- Arpád Györi (born 1970), Czech ice hockey player and coach
- Árpád Házi (1908–1970), Hungarian communist politician
- Árpád Henney (1895–1980), Hungarian politician and military officer who served as Minister without portfolio between 1944 and 1945 in the Nazi-dominated Ferenc Szálasi cabinet
- Arpad Joó (born 1948), Hungarian conductor and concert pianist
- Árpád Kovácsevics (born 1968), Hungarian football player
- Árpád Lehotay (1896–1953), Hungarian actor
- Árpád Lengyel (disambiguation), multiple people
- Árpád Majoros (born 1983), Hungarian football player
- Árpád Milinte (born 1976), Hungarian football player
- Árpád von Nahodyl (born 1958), German writer, neopagan activist and politician
- Árpád Orbán (1938–2008), Hungarian football player
- Árpád Pál (born 1955), Hungarian former handball player
- Árpád Pédery (1891–1914), Hungarian gymnast
- Árpád Prandler (born 1930), Hungarian judge of the International Criminal Tribunal
- Árpád Pusztai (born 1930), Hungarian-born biochemist and nutritionist
- Arpád Račko (born 1930), Slovak sculptor
- Arpad Simonyik (born 1940), Canadian sprint canoer
- Árpád Soltész (born 1944), Hungarian sprint canoer
- Árpád Soós (disambiguation), multiple people
- Árpád Sopsits (1952–2025), Hungarian theatre and film director, and screenwriter
- Árpád Sterbik (born 1979), Serbian-born Spanish handball player
- Árpád Szabó (1878–1948), Hungarian politician
- Árpád Szakasits (1888–1965), Hungarian Social Democrat, then Communist political figure
- Árpád Székely (living), Hungarian ambassador to the Russian Federation
- Árpád Szenes (1897–1985), Hungarian-Jewish abstract painter who worked in France
- Árpád Tóth (1886–1928), Hungarian poet and translator
- Árpád Vajda (1896–1967), Hungarian chess master
- Arpad Vass (born 1959), research scientist and forensic anthropologist
- Arpad Vass (footballer) (born 1989), Slovenian football player
- Árpád von Degen (1866–1934), Hungarian biologist and botanist
- Árpád Weisz (1896–1944), Hungarian Olympic football player and manager
- Arpad Wigand (1906–1983), SS-Oberführer who served as the SS and Police Leader in Warsaw
