= Joan Tower =

American composer, concert pianist and conductor

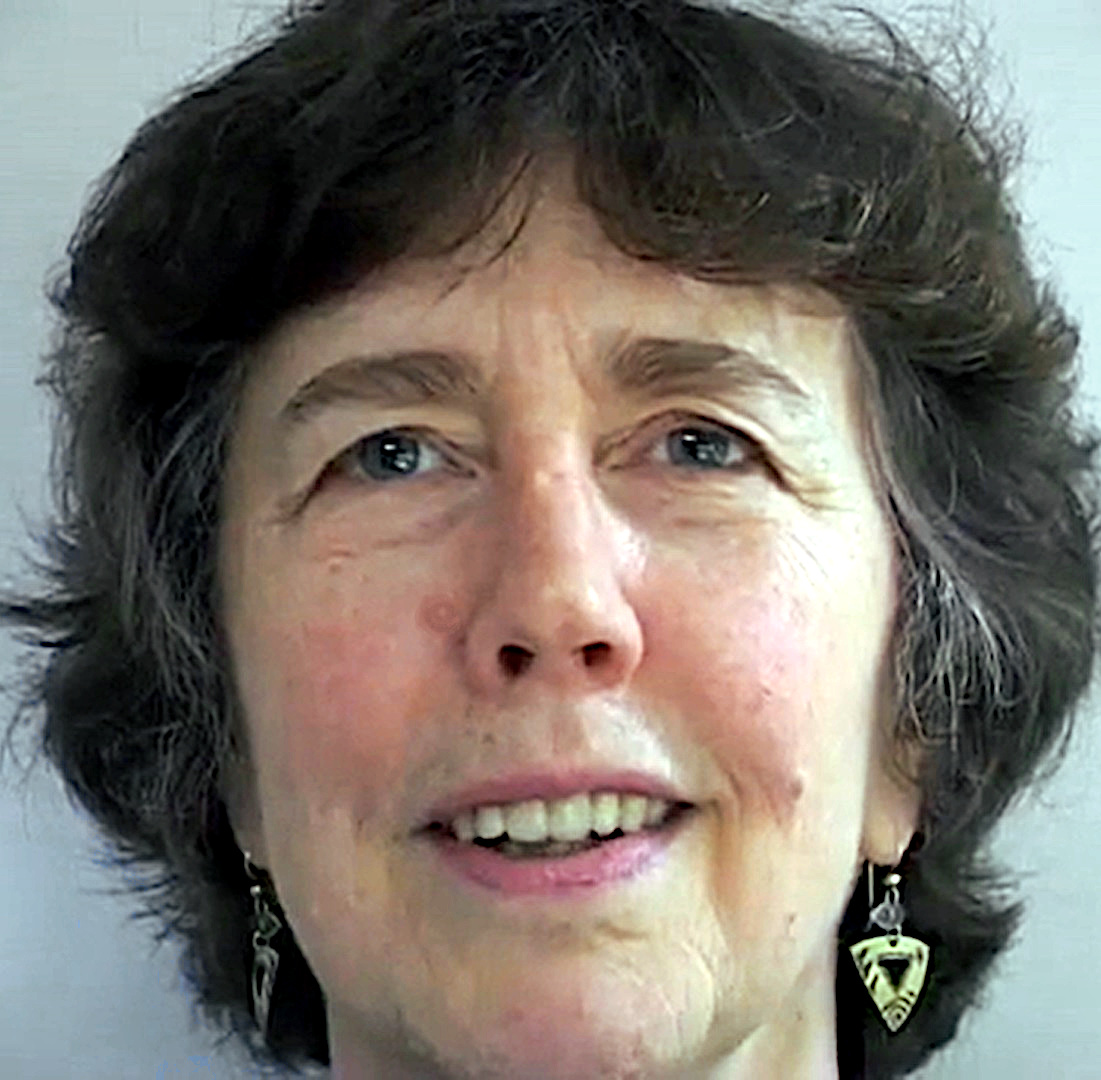
- Tower (circa 2003)
- Born: September 6, 1938 (age 88); New Rochelle, New York, U.S.
- Education: Bennington College; Columbia University (PhD)

Joan Tower (born September 6, 1938) is a Grammy-winning contemporary American composer, concert pianist, and conductor. Her work has been performed worldwide. Since gaining recognition for her first orchestral composition, Sequoia (1981), a tone poem that structurally depicts a giant tree from trunk to needles, she has written a variety of instrumental works, including Fanfare for the Uncommon Woman—something of a response to Aaron Copland's Fanfare for the Common Man—the Island Prelude, five string quartets, and an assortment of other tone poems. Tower was the pianist and a founding member of the Naumburg Award-winning Da Capo Chamber Players, which commissioned and premiered many of her early works, including her widely performed Petroushskates. The New Yorker has called her "one of the most successful woman composers of all time".

== Life and career ==
Born in New Rochelle, New York, in 1938, Tower moved to Bolivia when she was nine years old, an experience she credits for making rhythm an integral part of her work. She discovered this love for rhythm in the local saint's day celebrations. There, she learned how to play percussion and then started her musical journey. For the next decade Tower's talent in music, particularly on the piano, grew rapidly due to her father's insistence that she benefit from consistent musical training. Tower's relationship with her mineralogist father is visible in many aspects of her work, most specifically her "mineral works", such as Black Topaz (1976) and Silver Ladders (1986). She returned to the United States as a young woman to study music, first at Bennington College and then at Columbia University, where she studied with Otto Luening, Jack Beeson, and Vladimir Ussachevsky and was awarded her doctorate in composition in 1968.

In 1969 Tower, violinist Joel Lester, and flutist Patricia Spencer founded the New York-based Da Capo Chamber Players, where she served as the group's pianist. During the late 1970s and early 1980s Tower wrote a number of works for the Da Capo Players, including Platinum Spirals (1976), Amazon I (1977), and Wings (1981). The group won several awards in its early years, including the Walter W. Naumburg International Competition Award in 1973. Tower left the group in 1984, buoyed by the immediate success of her first orchestral composition, Sequoia (1981). Tower also was influenced by jazz music, having seen performers such as Miles Davis and John Coltrane in New York City clubs. This inspired her to become a jazz pianist for ten years and implement jazz chords in many of her works.

In 1972 Tower had accepted a faculty position at Bard College in composition, a post she continues to hold today. She received a Guggenheim fellowship in 1976. From 1985 to 1988 Tower was composer-in-residence at the St. Louis Symphony Orchestra.

Tower became the first woman recipient of the Grawemeyer Award for Music in 1990 for Silver Ladders. In 1993, on a commission from the Milwaukee Ballet, Tower composed Stepping Stones, and she conducted sections from it at the White House. Other compositions from the 1990s include the third Fanfare for the Uncommon Woman, several piano concertos (notably 1996's Rapids (Piano Concerto no. 2) and Tambor (1998), written for the Pittsburgh Symphony Orchestra. In 1999 Tower accepted a position as composer-in-residence with the Orchestra of St. Luke's and in 1998 she won the Delaware Symphony's Alfred I. DuPont Award for Distinguished American Composer.

In 2002 Tower won the Annual Composer's Award from the Lancaster Symphony. During the 2003–04 season two new works were debuted, DNA, a percussion quintet commissioned for Frank Epstein, and Incandescent. In 2004 the Nashville Symphony's recording of Tambor, Made in America, and her Concerto for Orchestra earned a Grammy nomination. In 2004 Carnegie Hall's "Making Music" series featured a retrospective of Tower's body of work, performed by artists including the Tokyo String Quartet and pianists Melvin Chen and Ursula Oppens. In 2005 Tower became the first composer commissioned for the "Ford Made in America" program, the only project of its kind to involve smaller-budget orchestras as commissioning agents of new work by major composers, in which her 15-minute Made in America was performed in every state of the union during the 2005–2007 season. In 2008, Made in America and its recording by the Nashville Symphony conducted by Leonard Slatkin won three Grammy Awards: Best Orchestral Performance, Best Classical Album, and Best Classical Contemporary Composition.

Alongside those listed above, her work has been performed by many of the world's leading orchestras and chamber ensembles, including The Orchestra Now, the New York Philharmonic, the Boston Symphony Orchestra, Seraph Brass, and the American Brass Quintet.

Tower is the Asher B. Edelman Professor of Music at Bard College in Annandale-on-Hudson, New York, and a member of the American Academy of Arts and Letters. She also serves on the Artistic Advisory panel of the BMI Foundation.

== Musical Style ==
Tower's early music reflects the influence of her mentors at Columbia University and is rooted in the serialist tradition, whose sparse texture complemented her interest in chamber music. As she developed as a composer Tower began to gravitate toward the work of Olivier Messiaen and George Crumb and broke away from strict serialism. Her work became more colorful and has often been described as impressionistic. She often composes with specific ensembles or soloists in mind, and aims to exploit their strengths in her work.

Among her most notable work is the six-part Fanfare for the Uncommon Woman, dedicated to "women who are adventurous and take risks". Inspired by Copland's Fanfare for the Common Man, four of the six parts are scored for 3 trumpets, 4 horns, 3 trombones, tuba and percussion. The first debuted in 1987, conducted by Hans Vonk. For the second, which premiered in 1989, Tower added one percussion while the third, debuted in 1991, is scored for a double brass quintet. The fourth and sixth are scored for full orchestra. The fifth part was commissioned for the Aspen Music Festival in 1993 and was written specifically for Joan W. Harris. The first five parts were added to the National Recording Registry in 2014.

== Works ==
=== Ballet ===
- Stepping Stones (1993), commissioned by the Milwaukee Ballet
  - Choreographed by Kathryn Posin

=== Orchestral ===
- Sequoia (1981)
  - commissioned by the Jerome Foundation for the American Composers Orchestra, who gave the work's première with Dennis Russell Davies conducting in New York City
- Island Rhythms (1985)
  - commissioned by the Florida Orchestra (with a grant from the Lincoln Properties Company), who gave the work's première under Irwin Hoffman on 29 June 1985.
- Silver Ladders (1986)
  - commissioned by the Saint Louis Symphony, and dedicated to Leonard Slatkin, who conducted the première. The work was a prize winner in the 1988 Kennedy Center Friedheim Awards, and in 1990 won the prestigious Grawemeyer Award.
- Concerto for Orchestra (1991)
  - co-commissioned by the Chicago Symphony, the Saint Louis Symphony and the New York Philharmonic.
- Fanfare for the Uncommon Woman (1987–1992)
  - commissioned by Absolut Vodka for the Houston Symphony, the New York Philharmonic, the Orchestra of St. Luke's and the Kansas City Symphony. The world première was given by the Houston Symphony with Hans Vonk conducting.
- Stepping Stones (1993)
  - commissioned by the Milwaukee Ballet
- Duets (1994), for chamber orchestra
  - written for the Los Angeles Chamber Orchestra
- Paganini Trills (1996)
  - premièred in Powell Symphony Hall, Saint Louis on 19 May 1996.
- Tambor (1998)
  - commissioned by Mariss Jansons and the Pittsburgh Symphony, who gave the work's première on 7 May 1998.
- The Last Dance (2000)
  - written for the Orchestra of St. Luke's, who premièred the work under Alan Gilbert (conductor) at Carnegie Hall, New York City on 24 February 2000.
- Fascinating Ribbons (2001), for concert band
  - commissioned by the College Band Directors National Association and was given its première at the CBDNA Conference in 2001.
- In Memory (2002), for string orchestra
  - transcription of a string quartet Tower wrote for the Cavani String Quartet
- Made in America (2004), for chamber orchestra
  - commissioned by Ford Made in America in partnership with the League of American Orchestras and Meet the Composer, for a consortium of over 60 amateur orchestras across the United States. The world première was given by the Glens Falls Symphony Orchestra in October 2005.
- Chamber Dance (2006), for chamber orchestra
  - written for the Orpheus Chamber Orchestra, who premièred the work at Carnegie Hall on May 6, 2006.
- Stroke (2010)
  - commissioned by the Pittsburgh Symphony, who premièred the work under Manfred Honeck on 13 May 2011 at Heinz Hall, Pittsburgh, Pennsylvania.
- 1920/2019 (2020) for orchestra
  - commissioned by the New York Philharmonic, who premièred the work under Jaap van Zweden on 3 December 2021.

=== Concertante ===
- Music for Cello and Orchestra (1984)
  - written for André Emelianoff
- Concerto for Piano (Homage to Beethoven) (1985), for piano and orchestra
  - co-commissioned by the Hudson Valley Philharmonic, the Saint Paul Chamber Orchestra and the Philharmonia Virtuosi, with a grant from the National Endowment for the Arts.
- Clarinet Concerto (1988), for clarinet and orchestra
  - commissioned by the Naumburg Foundation for clarinettist Charles Neidich, who gave the work's première with the American Symphony Orchestra under Jorge Mester in 1988
- Flute Concerto (1989), for flute and orchestra
  - written for Carol Wincenc, who gave the work's première.
- Island Prelude (1989), for oboe and string orchestra
  - written for oboist Peter Bowman, who premièred the work with the Saint Louis Symphony under Leonard Slatkin on 4 May 1989.
- Violin Concerto (1992), for violin and orchestra
  - commissioned by the Snowbird Institute and the Barlow Endowment
- Rapids (Piano Concerto No. 2) (1996), for piano and orchestra
  - commissioned by the University of Wisconsin for pianist Ursula Oppens
- Strike Zones (2001), concerto for percussion and orchestra
  - written for Evelyn Glennie and the National Symphony Orchestra, who gave the work's première under Leonard Slatkin at the Kennedy Center, Washington D.C. in October 2001.
- Purple Rhapsody (2005), concerto for viola and chamber orchestra
  - co-commissioned by the Omaha Symphony Orchestra, the Buffalo Philharmonic, the Virginia Symphony, the Kansas City Symphony, the ProMusica Chamber Orchestra (Columbus), the Peninsula Music Festival Orchestra (Door County, Wisconsin), and the Chautauqua Symphony Orchestra, with a grant from the Serge Koussevitzky Music Foundation in the Library of Congress. The work was premièred by the violist Paul Neubauer (to whom the work is dedicated) and the Omaha Symphony Orchestra in 2005.
- Red Maple (2013), for bassoon and string orchestra
  - premiered by Peter Kolkay, bassoon, with the South Carolina Philharmonic under Morihiko Nakahara on 4 October 2013.
- A New Day (2021) for cello and orchestra
  - commissioned by the Colorado Music Festival, the Cleveland Orchestra, the Detroit Symphony Orchestra, and the National Symphony Orchestra. The work was premièred by the cellist Alisa Weilerstein and the Colorado Music Festival Orchestra on 25 July 2021.

=== Chamber ===
- Breakfast Rhythms I. and II. (1974), for clarinet solo, flute, percussion, violin, cello and piano
- Black Topaz (1976), for flute, clarinet, trumpet, trombone, piano and two percussion
- Amazon I. (1977), for flute, clarinet, violin, cello and piano
- Petroushskates (1980), for flute, clarinet, violin, cello and piano
- Noon Dance (1982), for flute, clarinet, percussion, piano, violin and cello
- Fantasy... Harbour Lights (1983), for clarinet and piano
- Snow Dreams (1983), for flute and guitar
- Fanfare for the Uncommon Woman (1986), for eleven brass and three percussion
- Island Prelude (1989), for oboe solo and string quartet/quintet or wind quintet
- Second Fanfare for the Uncommon Woman (1989), for eleven brass and three percussion
- Third Fanfare for the Uncommon Woman (1991), for brass dectet
- Celebration Fanfare (1993), for eleven brass and three percussion
- Elegy (1993), for trombone solo and string quartet
- Fifth Fanfare for the Uncommon Woman (1993), for four trumpets
- Night Fields (String Quartet No. 1) (1994), for string quartet
- Très lent (Hommage à Messiaen) (1994), for cello and piano
- Turning Points (1995), for clarinet and string quartet
- And...they're off (1997), for piano trio
- Rain Waves (1997), for violin, clarinet and piano
- Toccanta (1997), for oboe and harpsichord
- Big Sky (2000), for piano trio
- In Memory (String Quartet No. 2 (2002), for string quartet
- Incandescent (String Quartet No. 3) (2003), for string quartet
- For Daniel (2004), for piano trio
- DNA (2005), for percussion quintet
- A Little Gift (2006), for flute and clarinet
- Copperwave (2006), for brass quintet
- A Gift (2007), for flute, clarinet, bassoon, horn and piano
- Trio Cavany (2007), for piano trio
- Angels (String Quartet No. 4) (2008), for string quartet
- Dumbarton Quintet (2008), for piano quintet
- Rising (2009), for flute and string quartet
- White Granite (2010), for piano quartet
  - 17-minute work, co-commissioned by the St Timothy's Summer Music Festival, Montana, the Bravo! Vail Valley Music Festival, Colorado, and the LaJolla Music Society for SummerFest, California. Premièred in Georgetown Lake, Montana on 11 July 2010.
- White Water (String Quartet No. 5) (2011), for string quartet, commissioned for the Daedalus Quartet by Chamber Music Monterey Bay.

=== Instrumental ===
- Circles (1964), for piano
- Fantasia (1966), for piano
- Platinum Spirals (1976), for violin
- Red Garnet Waltz (1977), for piano
- Wings (1981), for clarinet or alto saxophone
- Clocks (1985), for guitar
- Or like a...an engine (1994), for piano
- Ascent (1996), for organ
- Holding a Daisy (1996), for piano
- Valentine Trills (1996), for flute
- Wild Purple (1998), for viola
- Vast Antique Cubes/Throbbing Still (2000), for piano
- Simply Purple (2008), for viola
- Ivory and Ebony (2009), for piano
- For Marianne (2010), for flute
- String Force (2010), for violin
- Steps (2011), for piano
- Purple Rush (2016), for viola

=== Vocal ===
- Can I (2007), for S.S.A.A. choir and percussionist
  - written for the Young People's Chorus of New York City, who premièred the work under Francisco J. Nuñez at the Miller Theater, New York City on 27 April 2008.

== Interviews ==
- Joan Tower interviewed by Michael Schell, July 22, 2021 on Radio Eclectus, KHUH-LP
- At 80, Joan Tower Says Great Music Comes ‘in the Risks’, New York Times, November 9, 2018, by William Robin
- Joan Tower interview by Bruce Duffie, April, 1987
- Private Interview with Joan Tower, February 23, 1988, Saint Louis, MO, in "An Analysis of Joan Tower's Wings for Solo Clarinet", August 1992, by Nancy E. Leckie Bonds
- Private Interview with Joan Tower, May 21, 1988, Saint Louis, MO, in "An Analysis of Joan Tower's Wings for Solo Clarinet", August 1992, by Nancy E. Leckie Bonds,
- Joan Tower (September 15, 2005). "Joan Tower: Made In America". NewMusicBox (Interview). Interviewed by Frank J. Oteri (published October 1, 2005).
- The composer in conversation with Bruce Duffie, published in New Music Connoisseur Magazine, Spring, 2001.

== Discography ==
- Big Sky: Chamber Music of American Women Composers White Pine WPM202
- Cantos Desiertos / BEASER / TOWER / LIEBERMANN Naxos – Catalogue No:8.559146
- Chamber and Solo Music Naxos – Catalogue No:8.559215 Chamber Music, Instrumental
- Red Maple, Peter Kolkay (bassoon), Calidore String Quartet. Bridge Records 9587 (2023)
- Silver Ladders / Island Prelude / Sequoia Naxos – Catalogue No:FECD-0025
- TOWER: Made in America / Tambor / Concerto for Orchestra Naxos – Catalogue No: 8.559328
- WORLD PREMIERE COLLECTION Naxos- Catalogue No: FECD-0032
