= Chamber Dance =

Musical composition by Joan Tower

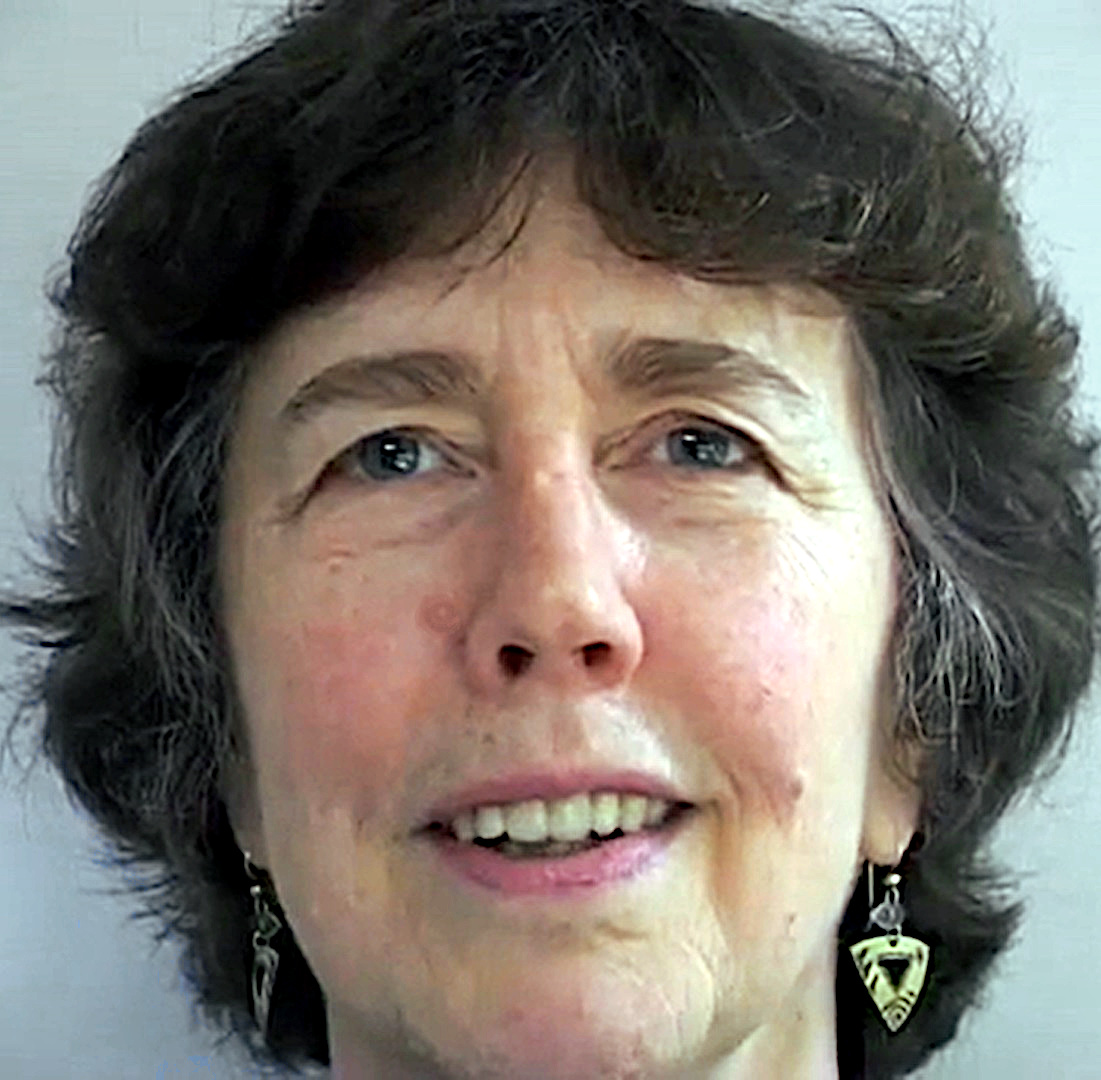
Joan Tower ca. 2002–05

Chamber Dance is a composition for orchestra written by the American composer Joan Tower. The work was commissioned by the Orpheus Chamber Orchestra, to which it is dedicated. The piece was first performed by the same ensemble at Carnegie Hall on May 6, 2006.

== Composition ==
Chamber Dance is cast in one continuous movement and has a duration of approximately 15 minutes. Despite its title, the work is not a piece of chamber music in the traditional sense, being scored for a modest-sized orchestra. In the score program note, Tower explained, "It is chamber music in the sense that I always thought of Orpheus as a large chamber group, interacting and 'dancing' with one another the way smaller chamber groups do. Like dancers, the members of this large group have to be very much in touch with what everyone else is doing, and allow for changing leadership to guide the smaller and bigger ensembles." She continued, "Chamber Dance weaves through a tapestry of solos, duets, and ensembles where the oboe, flute, and violin are featured as solos and the violin and clarinet, cello and bassoon, two trumpets, and unison horns step out of the texture as duets. The ensemble writing is fairly vertical and rhythmic in its profile, thereby creating an ensemble that has to 'dance' well together."

=== Instrumentation ===
The music is scored for an orchestra comprising two flutes (2nd doubling piccolo), two oboes, two clarinets, two bassoons, two horns, two trumpets, timpani (doubling percussion), and strings.

== Reception ==
The music critic Corinna da Fonseca-Wollheim of The New York Times described Chamber Dance as "slinky, fast-flowing and infused with a strong sense of rhythm," adding, "it's an infectious piece of orchestral writing." Anthony Burton of BBC Music Magazine said that the piece "requires a chamber-music-like responsiveness among the players. It bears further witness to Tower's imaginative handling of instrumental colouring."

Timothy Mangan of the Orange County Register was more critical of the work, however, remarking, "In Chamber Dance, Tower [...] reveals a sure craftsmanship, Stravinskian ear and conservative bent. The way this music trades off between the instruments, and seems to gather itself into syncopated allegros, is accessible without being all that interesting. It feels predictable, and that, I'm afraid, is what people want these days."

== Recording ==
A recording of Chamber Dance performed by the Nashville Symphony conducted by Giancarlo Guerrero was released on album, together with Tower's Violin Concerto and Stroke, through Naxos Records in May 2015.
