= Cambor =

Cambor is a surname. Notable people with the surname include:

- Kathleen Cambor (fl. 1997), American author
- Peter Cambor (born 1978), American actor, writer, and producer

== See also ==
- Camber (disambiguation)
- Tambor (disambiguation)
