= Strike zone (disambiguation) =

Strike zone may refer to:

- Strike zone, in baseball, the area over home plate through which a pitch must pass in order to count as a strike
- Strike Zone (book), a science fiction novel set in the Star Trek expanded universe
- "Strike Zone", a song by Loverboy from their 1983 album Keep It Up
- Strike Zones, a percussion concerto by Joan Tower
