= Fanfare for the Uncommon Woman =

Set of orchestral compositions by Joan Tower

Fanfares for the Uncommon Woman is a series of six short compositions, or “parts” of one 25-minute composition, by Joan Tower. Parts I and II are scored for brass and percussion, parts III and V are scored for brass ensembles, and Parts IV and VI for full orchestra. Tower wrote Parts I-V between 1987 and 1993, and Part VI twenty-one years later, in 2014. The fanfares are a tribute to "women who take risks and are adventurous", with each dedicated to an inspiring woman in music.

== Background ==
Joan Tower began composing music in the 1960s, at a time when the male-dominated music world followed the composition standards of post-World War II Europe. She is among the generation of female American composers credited with creating her own voice and leading the way for later generations.

== Summary ==
The first and most popular of the Fanfares was commissioned by the Houston Symphony as part of the orchestra's Fanfare Project and was composed in 1986. It debuted on January 10, 1987, with the Houston Symphony conducted by Hans Vonk. It was originally inspired by Copland's Fanfare for the Common Man and employs the same instrumentation while adding the glockenspiel, marimba, chimes, and drums. The piece is about 2 minutes and 41 seconds long and is dedicated to the conductor Marin Alsop. It contains an opening flourish, huge percussion strokes, and then a galloping rhythm that pushes through the rest of the piece to reach the conclusion.

The second Fanfare was written in 1989 and uses the same instrumentation as the first while adding percussion. It was commissioned by Absolut Vodka and premiered at Lincoln Center in 1989. It was performed by the Orchestra of Saint Luke's and is about 3 minutes and 23 seconds long. It is dedicated to Joan Briccetti, a former general manager of the St. Louis Symphony.

The third Fanfare was written in 1991 and was commissioned by Carnegie Hall in commemoration of its 100th anniversary. It premiered on May 5, 1991, and was performed by the Empire Brass and members of the New York Philharmonic brass section. The conductor was Zubin Mehta and it is about 5 minutes and 15 seconds long. It omits the percussion seen in the previous fanfares, instead being scored for a double brass quintet. It is laid out on a larger scale than the others and gradually moves from quiet lyricism to full-ensemble chords before slowing down into a final coda. It is dedicated to Frances Richard, director of concert music at ASCAP.

The fourth Fanfare was written in 1992 and was the only one in the series scored for full orchestra where the brass does not dominate. However, its propulsive rhythms and sheer energy qualify it as a fanfare. The piece was commissioned by the Kansas City Symphony, and premiered on October 16, 1992, conducted by William McGlaughlin. The piece is about 4 minutes and 35 seconds long and is dedicated to conductor JoAnn Falletta.

The fifth Fanfare was written in 1993 and was commissioned by the Aspen Music Festival for the opening of the Joan and Irving Harris Concert Hall in 1993. It is scored for trumpet quartet, the smallest ensemble required for any of the fanfares. It is approximately 3 minutes long and dedicated to Joan Harris.

The sixth Fanfare was written in 2014 for solo piano, and was later adapted for full orchestra in 2016. It was premiered by the Baltimore Symphony Orchestra under the baton of Marin Alsop. It is about 5 minutes and 30 seconds, and is dedicated to composer Tania Leon.

== Performances ==
The Fanfares have been performed worldwide by over 500 ensembles.

In 1999, the first five Fanfares were recorded by the Colorado Symphony Orchestra, along with Tower's "Concerto for Orchestra" and "Duets for Orchestra". Tower dedicated the first Fanfare to the conductor of the recording, Marin Alsop. In 2015, this recording was added to the Library of Congress' National Recording Registry, having been judged “culturally, historically, or aesthetically important.”
