= Arpad =

Arpad or Árpád may refer to:

== People ==
- Árpád (given name), a Hungarian men's name
- Árpád (c. 845–907), first ruler of Hungary

== Places ==
- Arpad, Syria, an ancient city in present-day Syria near Tell Rifaat
- Árpád, the Hungarian name for Arpăşel village, Batăr Commune, Bihor County, Romania

== Other ==
- Árpád Bridge, a bridge in Budapest, Hungary, named after the above person
- Árpád dynasty, the ruling dynasty in Hungary
- Arpad, the Gypsy, a Hungarian-French-German television film series
- SMS Árpád, the name of an Austro-Hungarian battleship
