= Flute Concerto (Tower) =

1989 Concerto by Joan Tower

The Concerto for Flute is a composition for solo flute and orchestra by the American composer Joan Tower. The work was commissioned by the American Composers Orchestra and was composed in 1989. It was first performed at Carnegie Hall on January 28, 1990, by the flutist Carol Wincenc and the American Composers Orchestra under the conductor Hugh Wolff. The piece is dedicated to Carol Wincenc.

== Composition ==
The Flute Concerto has a duration of roughly 15 minutes and is composed in one continuous movement. Tower briefly described the piece in the score program notes, writing, "The 15-minute work starts with the low register of the flute alone before the orchestra comes. As the flute gets more active, the chamber-size orchestra provides competitive tension which is matched phrase by phrase as the piece heads relentlessly towards to a finale where the "music blows wide open" (Wincenc) in a virtuosic display of flute scales and arpeggios."

=== Instrumentation ===
The work is scored for solo flute and a small orchestra comprising an additional flute (doubling piccolo), oboe, clarinet (doubling bass clarinet), bassoon, trumpet, bass trombone, two percussionists, and strings.

== Reception ==
The Flute Concerto has been praised by music critics. Reviewing the world premiere, Bernard Holland of The New York Times wrote, "It is a one-movement work that makes a musical virtue of its technical cleverness. The flute's natural reticence in big formats is a problem met head on, not simply avoided by separating solo instrument from orchestra." He added:

Indeed, low registers set against finely separated ensemble colors give the flute a strong and intelligible identity. Voices from within the orchestra often double the solo line. Elsewhere, its racing, skittering passages explore and expand on the instrument's natural trilling character. There is an honest sentiment and energy here that Carol Wincenc, the afternoon's soloist (and the piece's dedicatee), presented forcefully.

In a later review, Martin Bernheimer of the Financial Times similarly praised "the mad coloratura" of the piece.
