= Concerto for Orchestra (Tower) =

Orchestral composition by Joan Tower

The Concerto for Orchestra is an orchestral composition by the American composer Joan Tower. The work was jointly commissioned by the St. Louis Symphony, the Chicago Symphony Orchestra, and the New York Philharmonic.

== Composition ==
The Concerto for Orchestra is composed in two connected sections and has a duration of roughly 30 minutes. Tower described the composition in the score program note, writing:

In every sense, Concerto for Orchestra is my biggest work to date. It's the first piece purely for orchestra I've written since Silver Ladders in 1986, but it follows three solo concertos — for clarinet, flute, and violin — and reflects that experience, enabling me to take more risks between soloists and orchestra. Whereas Silver Ladders highlighted four solo instruments, here not only solos, but duos, trios, and other combinations of instruments form structural, timbral, and emotive elements of the piece. As in all my music, I am working here on motivating the structure, trying to be sensitive to how an idea reacts to or results from the previous ideas in the strongest and most natural way — a lesson I've learned from studying the music of Beethoven. Although technically demanding, the virtuoso sections are an integral part of the music, resulting from accumulated energy, rather than being designed purely as display elements. I thus resisted the title Concerto for Orchestra (with its connotations of Bartók, Lutoslawski, and Husa), and named the work only after the composing was completed, and even then reluctantly.

=== Instrumentation ===
The work is scored for an orchestra comprising three flutes (doubling piccolo), two oboes, cor anglais, three clarinets (doubling E-flat clarinet and bass clarinet), three bassoons (doubling contrabassoon), four horns, three trumpets, three trombones, tuba, timpani, three percussionists, harp, piano, and strings.

== Reception ==
The Concerto for Orchestra has received positive marks from critics. Peter G. Davis of New York called it "a colorful and engaging piece that will surely take its place beside the composer's much-played Sequoia and Silver Ladders." He added, "Although it lacks a catchy title, the one-movement score generates a similar sort of musical imagery, even if the basic idea is rather more abstract: a half-hour trip through a large landscape in which constantly changing musical shapes and gestures suggest a time span spent traversing great spaces and long distances." David Gutman of Gramophone gave the concerto a more mixed review, however, remarking, "There are deliberate echoes of Bartok, Stravinsky and even Bernard Herrmann in the Concerto for Orchestra, as well as a welcome emphasis on rhythm and movement, but the work lacks the kind of distinctive material that would lift it onto another plane."
