= Gyori =

Gyori is a surname, meaning "from Győr". Notable people with the surname include:

- Arpád Györi (born 1970), Czech ice hockey player and coach
- Ferenc Győri (born 1964), Hungarian ultramarathon runner and geographer
- János Győri (born 1976), Hungarian footballer
- Ladislao Pablo Győri (born 1963), Argentine-Hungarian engineer, digital and visual artist, essayist and poet
- Mátyás Győri (born 1997), Hungarian handballer
- Noemi Győri (born 1983), Hungarian classical flautist
