= Piano Concerto (Tower) =

The Concerto for Piano (Homage to Beethoven) is the first piano concerto by the American composer Joan Tower. The work was commissioned by the Hudson Valley Philharmonic, the Saint Paul Chamber Orchestra, and the Philharmonia Virtuosi with a grant from the National Endowment for the Arts. Its world premiere was performed by the pianist Jacquelyn M. Helin and the Hudson Valley Philharmonic conducted by Imre Palló on January 31, 1986. The music contains numerous allusions to the music of Ludwig van Beethoven, in whose memory it is dedicated.

== Composition ==
The concerto has a performance duration of approximately 21 minutes and is written in one continuous movement divided into three sections, each referencing its own Beethoven sonata. The first section was inspired by the Piano Sonata No. 17, Op. 31, The Tempest, about which Tower was impressed by "its unusual (even for Beethoven) alternating slow and fast pacing." The second section includes a cadenza that quotes the Piano Sonata No. 32, Op. 111, Beethoven's final piano sonata. The piano cadenza in the final section contains a theme taken from the third movement of the Piano Sonata No. 21, Op. 53, Waldstein.

=== Instrumentation ===
The work is scored for solo piano and an orchestra comprising two flutes (2nd doubling piccolo), oboe, two clarinets (2nd doubling bass clarinet), bassoon, two horns in F, two trumpets, bass trombone, two percussionists, and strings.

== Reception ==
Reviewing the world premiere, the music critic Bernard Holland of The New York Times viewed the piece rather unfavorably, remarking, "Miss Tower's concerto rides the crest of a curiously tranquil new wave of composers - this sleepy avant-garde of ours that seems to have gazed deeply into the eyes of the future and found nothing there at all." He continued:

Indeed, almost every harmonic device, every melodic turn or rhythmic figure here referred back to something that we already know. Miss Tower, what is more, seemed primarily interested in preserving the familiarity, not in making new things from it. Listening to this concerto's Beethovenian allusions, its little bursts of minimalist repetition, its whole-tone methodology, its warmly chiming percussion effects - all smoothly glued one to the next - was a little like walking into a shiny new split-level house that has been crammed with antiques. One cannot decide whether one is experiencing the past, the present or really anything at all.
