= Clarinet Concerto (Tower) =

Musical composition by Joan Tower

The Concerto for Clarinet is a composition for solo clarinet and orchestra by the American composer Joan Tower. The work was commissioned by the Walter W. Naumburg Foundation for the clarinetist Charles Neidich, to whom the piece is dedicated.

== Composition ==
The concerto has a duration of roughly 19 minutes and is composed in one continuous movement. Tower described the piece in the score program note, writing:

The Clarinet Concerto, which lasts about 19 minutes, is divided into three large sections (fast-slow-fast), and includes four cadenzas—two for the soloist and two for two clarinets; one of the solo cadenzas in the slow movement is accompanied by the orchestra. The work is built on two themes. The first theme, a "melodic" idea, unfolds slowly throughout the introduction. The soloist presents the second theme, which is more motivic and scalar in character. These two ideas interact throughout the Concerto, and are developed in some instances to such a degree that they are transformed into new themes, which are in turn developed. One of these later derived ideas, a chord made from the notes of the first theme, is sustained for a long time through a crescendo and diminuendo. This chord, which occurs throughout the Concerto, was borrowed from my latest orchestral work, Silver Ladders, and was in turn taken from a long-held note in the solo clarinet movement of Messiaen's Quartet for the End of Time. The Concerto ends quietly with the second half of the first theme and the long-held chord.

=== Instrumentation ===
The work is scored for solo clarinet and an orchestra comprising two flutes (doubling piccolo), two oboes, two clarinets, two bassoons, four horns, two trumpets, trombone, bass trombone, tuba, timpani, two percussionists, harp, piano (doubling celesta), and strings.

== Reception ==
The music critic John Henken lauded the concerto for its "remarkable" combination of "orchestral color and solo verve." Susan Bliss of the Los Angeles Times also praised the piece, writing:

Tower has created a powerful piece, deserving of more frequent hearing. It stands as a single movement that divides into traditional fast-slow-fast sections, dark, busy and threatening music broken by atmospheric musings which become increasingly foreboding. Relationships between solo and orchestral roles are tight and symbiotic, with some sense of pianistic improvisation (Tower began her career as a pianist), despite idiomatic and exacting scoring.
