= Petroushskates =

Petroushskates is a chamber music composition by the American composer Joan Tower. The work was composed in 1980 for the tenth anniversary of the Da Capo Chamber Players. It is scored for a Pierrot ensemble: flute, clarinet, violin, cello, and piano.

== Composition ==
Petroushskates is composed of one short movement with a duration of roughly five minutes. The work was partially inspired by "The Shrovetide Fair" scene from Igor Stravinsky's ballet Petrushka as well as by the movements of ice skating, about which Tower wrote in the score program note: "While watching the figure skating event at the recent winter Olympics, I became fascinated with the way the curving, twirling, and jumping figure are woven around a singular continuous flowing action. Combining these two ideas creates a kind of carnival on ice – a possible subtitle for this piece." The title is thus an amalgam of "Petrushka" and "skates."

== Reception ==
John Henken of the Los Angeles Times praised the work, writing, "Joan Tower's Petroushskates [...] relies on ostinatos and a recycled harmonic and motivic framework, here of specific identity. But her quintet for mixed ensemble has great motor energy and effectively transmutes its materials into some vivacious chamber pop." It was also praised by Gramophone, which said of the piece, "Petroushskates (1980) has long been a calling-card for Joan Tower, but its synthesis of minimalist figuration with a harmonic style owing more to Stravinsky than just surface allusions is an engaging one."
