= 1920/2019 =

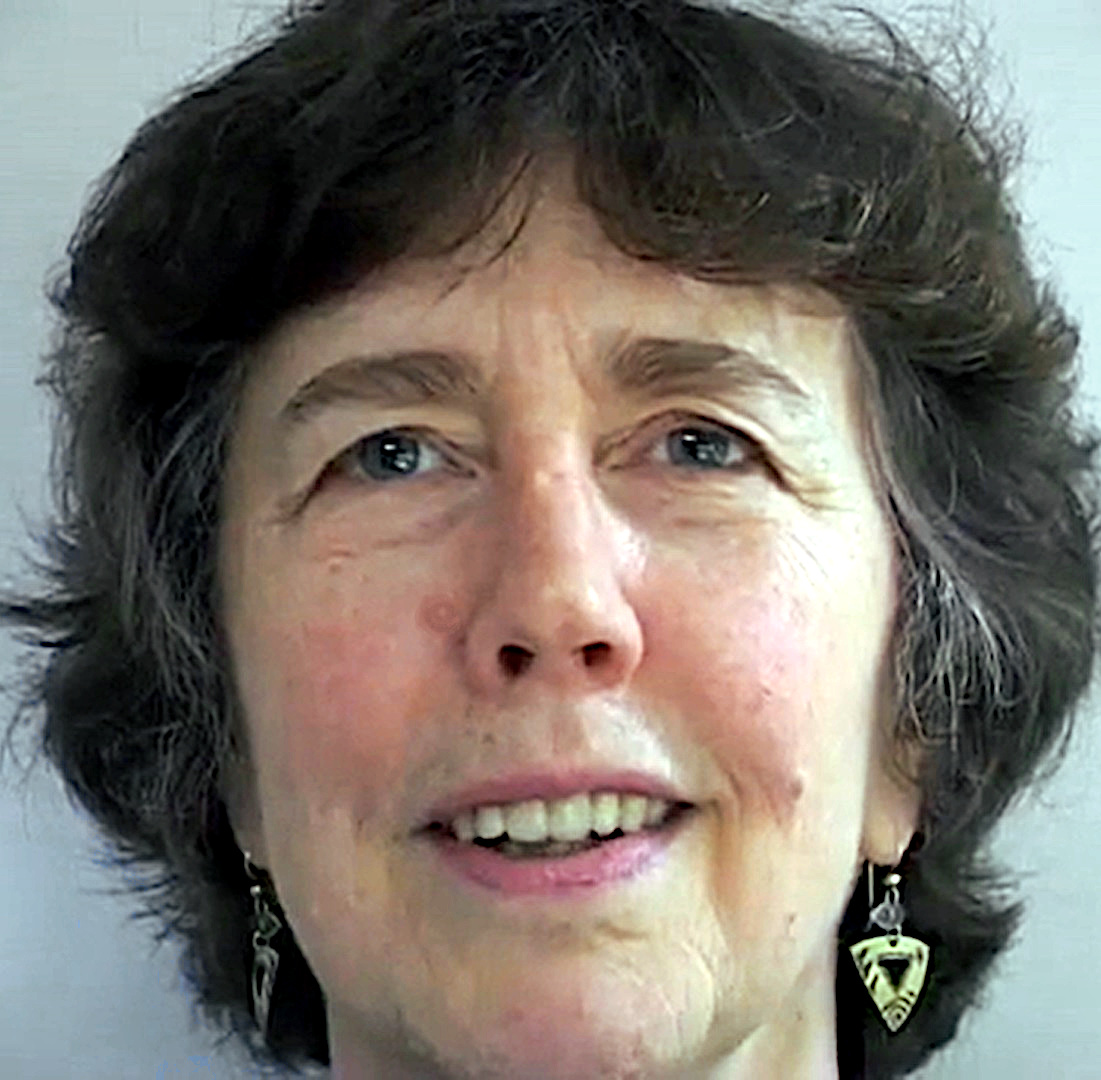
Joan Tower ca. 2002–05

1920/2019 is an orchestral composition written by the American composer Joan Tower. The work was commissioned by the New York Philharmonic as part of "Project 19," an initiative commissioning new works by 19 female composers in honor of the centennial of the ratification of the Nineteenth Amendment to the United States Constitution. Its world premiere, though delayed by the COVID-19 pandemic, was given by the New York Philharmonic under the direction of Jaap van Zweden at Alice Tully Hall on December 3, 2021. The piece is dedicated to the New York Philharmonic president and CEO Deborah Borda "in recognition of her vision for the creation of Project 19."

== Composition ==
1920/2019 is cast in a single movement and lasts approximately 14 minutes in performance. The title of the piece is inspired by two years that Tower regarded as "probably the two most historically significant years for the advancement of women in society." The first, 1920, was the year of the ratification of the Nineteenth Amendment, which recognized the right of women to vote in the United States; the second, 2019, saw the continued proliferation of the #MeToo movement, which raised awareness of sexual abuse and sexual harassment.

=== Instrumentation ===
The work is scored for an orchestra comprising two flutes (2nd doubling piccolo), two oboes, two clarinets, two bassoons, four horns, two trumpets, two trombones, bass trombone, tuba, timpani, three percussionists, piano, and strings.

== Reception ==
Reviewing the world premiere of 1920/2019, the music critic Anthony Tommasini of The New York Times called it an "engrossing, effective piece." Jay Nordlinger of The New Criterion similarly praised the duration and arc of the music, writing, "It is expertly—I want to say brilliantly—crafted. It is a brainy work, and also a stirring one." He further remarked, "Frankly, 1920/2019 is one of the best new pieces, in any genre, I have heard in recent years. I look forward to hearing it again. And I bet it will have a long life—that it will outlive the youngest person in the hall, whoever he or she was. Joan Tower is a composer to stand up and cheer for, as many of us did on Friday night."
