= Matthew Barnson =

American composer (born 1979)

- Born: Matthew Barnson; July 6, 1979 (age 47)
- Origin: Utah
- Genres: Contemporary classical
- Occupation: Composer
- Instrument: Viola
- Years active: 1998-present
- Label: Tzadik

Matthew Barnson (born 1979) is an American composer.

== Biography ==
Barnson is a native of Utah and obtained his undergraduate degree from the Eastman School of Music. He pursued graduate studies in composition at the University of Pennsylvania and Yale University. Barnson is the youngest recipient of a Barlow Commission from the BYU College of Fine Arts and Communications. He was awarded a 2009 Charles Ives Prize. He is currently an assistant professor of composition at Stony Brook University.

== Works ==
Barnson's works have been performed by the following individuals / groups:

- Arditti String Quartet
- Curtis Symphony Orchestra
- The New York Virtuoso Singers
- Members of Alarm Will Sound
- Members of the Philadelphia Orchestra
- Soprano Nicole Cabell
- Countertenor Ian Howell
- Academy Manson Ensemble, with conductor Simon Bainbridge
- Shouse Ensemble F-Plus

== Discography ==
- Sibyl Tones (Tzadik Records, 2014)
