= Tambor =

Tambor may refer to:

== People ==
- Jeffrey Tambor (born 1944), American actor
- Tambor Williams (born 1941), American politician

== Places ==
- Tambor, Costa Rica, a town
  - Tambor Airport
- El Tambor River, Guatemala

== Arts ==
- Tambor (dance), an Afro-Venezuelan music and dance
- Tambor (Tower), a 1998 orchestral composition by Joan Tower
- Wat Tambor, a fictional character in the Star Wars universe

== Ships ==
- Tambor-class submarine, a class of United States Navy submarines
- USS Tambor (SS-198), a US Navy submarine 1940–1945, lead ship of the Tambor class

== See also ==
- Tamboor, a town in Karnataka, India
