= Narong Prangcharoen =

Thai composer of classical music (born 1973)

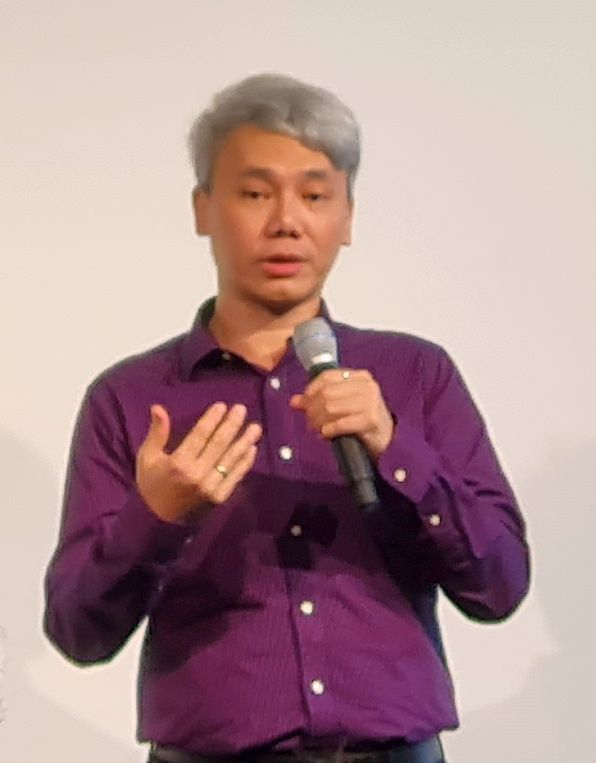
Image of Narong Prangcharoen

Narong Prangcharoen (born 23 July 1973) is a Thai composer of contemporary music. His compositions have won him the Guggenheim Fellowship, the Barlow Prize, and the Alexander Zemlinsky International Composition Competition Prize. He is the founder of Thailand International Composition Festival (TICF). Currently, he serves as Dean of the College of Music, Mahidol University in Thailand, as well as composer-in-residence for Thailand Philharmonic Orchestra and Pacific Symphony in Orange County, California. His scores for orchestra and wind ensemble are published exclusively by Theodore Presser Company.

== Biography ==
=== Early life ===
Narong Prangcharoen is originally from the Uttaradit province in northern Thailand. His first experience with classical music took place during the secondary education at Horwang School in Bangkok, where he became a member of the school's wind ensemble playing trumpet. In 1991, he became a music education major at Srinakharinwirot University in 1991. He took some music theory classes with Kit Young, an American composer and pianist who exposed Prangcharoen for the first time to 20th-century music. During his junior year, Prangcharoen turned his focus to piano when he went to Kit Young's piano recital and was fascinated by sonic variety of her contemporary repertoire. He started taking piano lessons with Young and within a year, passed the grade 6 piano examination of the International Examinations Board, Trinity College London. He then became a piano instructor at Chintakarn Music Institute where he met another American pianist, Bennett Lerner, who was the Head of the Piano Department of the Institute and later became Prangcharoen's piano instructor. Under Lerner's instruction, he achieved a Certificate Examination for solo piano from the Guildhall examinations board.

=== Musical education ===
Boredom and stress from piano playing triggered Prangcharoen's musical move in 1998. Kit Young suggested him to try composition as an alternative to cope with musical fatigue and introduced him to Narongrit Dhamabutra, a composition professor at Chulalongkorn University. After two years, Prangcharoen pursued a master's program at Illinois State University (ISU) in August 2000. At ISU, he took composition lessons primarily with Stephen Andrew Taylor, who introduced him to post-war serialism and American popular music. But most importantly, Taylor instructed him how to organize effective pitch and rhythmic materials, abilities that became Prangcharoen's most significant compositional tools in setting up and developing his compositional style. In 2002, Prangcharoen attended the Conservatory of Music and Dance at the University of Missouri-Kansas City (UMKC) for a doctoral degree in music composition. His primary composition professor was Chen Yi, who had a great influence on his cross-cultural compositional style.

=== Career ===
After receiving the Doctor of Musical Arts (D.M.A.) from UMKC in 2010, he worked as a freelance composer and taught composition and piano at the Community Music and Dance Academy of the UMKC Conservatory of Music and Dance. In 2013, Prangcharoen received the Guggenheim Award, the Barlow Prize, and a three-year composer residency with the Pacific Symphony.

Besides the United States, Prangcharoen has been active in the Asian continent. He has been a guest composer at the Beijing Modern Music Festival in China. In Thailand, he founded the Thailand International Composition Festival (TICF), an annual weeklong summer music festival which had its thirteenth anniversary in 2017, with a purpose to promote the contemporary classical music's scene of Thailand and other Southeast Asian countries.

== Compositions ==
Prangcharoen's music is known for its captivating melodies, effervescent rhythms, brilliant orchestrations, ethereal qualities, and cross-cultural backgrounds. His programmatic Phenomenon for orchestra (2004), in particular, has been praised for its "eventful" and "thrilling" "sonic tour de force" and "vivid and memorable pictorial setting."

Besides Phenomenon, Prangcharoen's most distinguished works include Mantras for soprano saxophone and wind symphony, Whispering for soprano saxophone, bass clarinet, piano, and percussion (2008), and Three Minds for solo piano (2003). His orchestral work Pubbanimitta ("Foreboding") was inspired by climate change and the many resulting natural disasters throughout the world.

=== Selected works ===
See the complete list of Prangcharoen's compositions in Pawatchai Suwankangka's dissertation

- 2003 – Three Minds for piano
- 2004 – Phenomenon for orchestra
- 2005 – Sattha for strings, piano, and percussion
- 2007 – Chakra for wind ensemble
- 2008 – Whispering for soprano saxophone, bass clarinet, piano, and percussion
- 2009 – Namaskar for wind ensemble
- 2009 – Mantras for soprano saxophone and wind symphony
- 2012 – The Migration of Lost Souls for orchestra
- 2014 – Dialogue for violin, guitar, harpsichord, and voice
- 2014 – Pact Ink for piano
- 2015 – Eng-Chang the Musical
- 2016 – Night Sky for orchestra
- 2016 – Lighter than Air for orchestra
- 2016 – Luminary for piano and orchestra
- 2016 – Endless Tears for voice and orchestra
- 2017 _ Poem Ayutthaya for choir and orchestra

== Awards ==
- 2005 – Second Prize from the Alexander Zemlinsky International Composition Competition
- 2007 – A recipient of the Silapathorn Award, an honor for living Thai contemporary artists presented by the Office of Contemporary Art and Culture, Ministry of Culture of Thailand
- 2008 – Winner of the Annapolis Charter 300 Young Composers Competition
- 2010 – First Prize from the Minnesota Orchestra Composer Institute Competition
- 2013 – Guggenheim Fellowship for Music
- 2013 – Barlow Prize

== Recordings ==
- 2009 – Phenomenon (Albany Records TROY1121) (Includes Chakra, Sattha, Three Minds, Respiration of the Sun, Far from Home, and Phenomenon).
- 2011 – Bencharong with Olivier Nowak (flute), Raman Ramakrishran (cello), and Ming-Hsiu Yen (piano) (The Intimacy of Creativity IOC110508)
- 2012 – Mantras (Albany Records TROY1322) (Includes Whispering, Between Heaven and Earth, Antakharana, Bencharong, Verdana, and Mantras)
- 2015 – Pact Ink with Christopher Janwong McKiggan (piano) (Albany TROY1543)
