= Made in America (Tower) =

2004 orchestral composition by Joan Tower

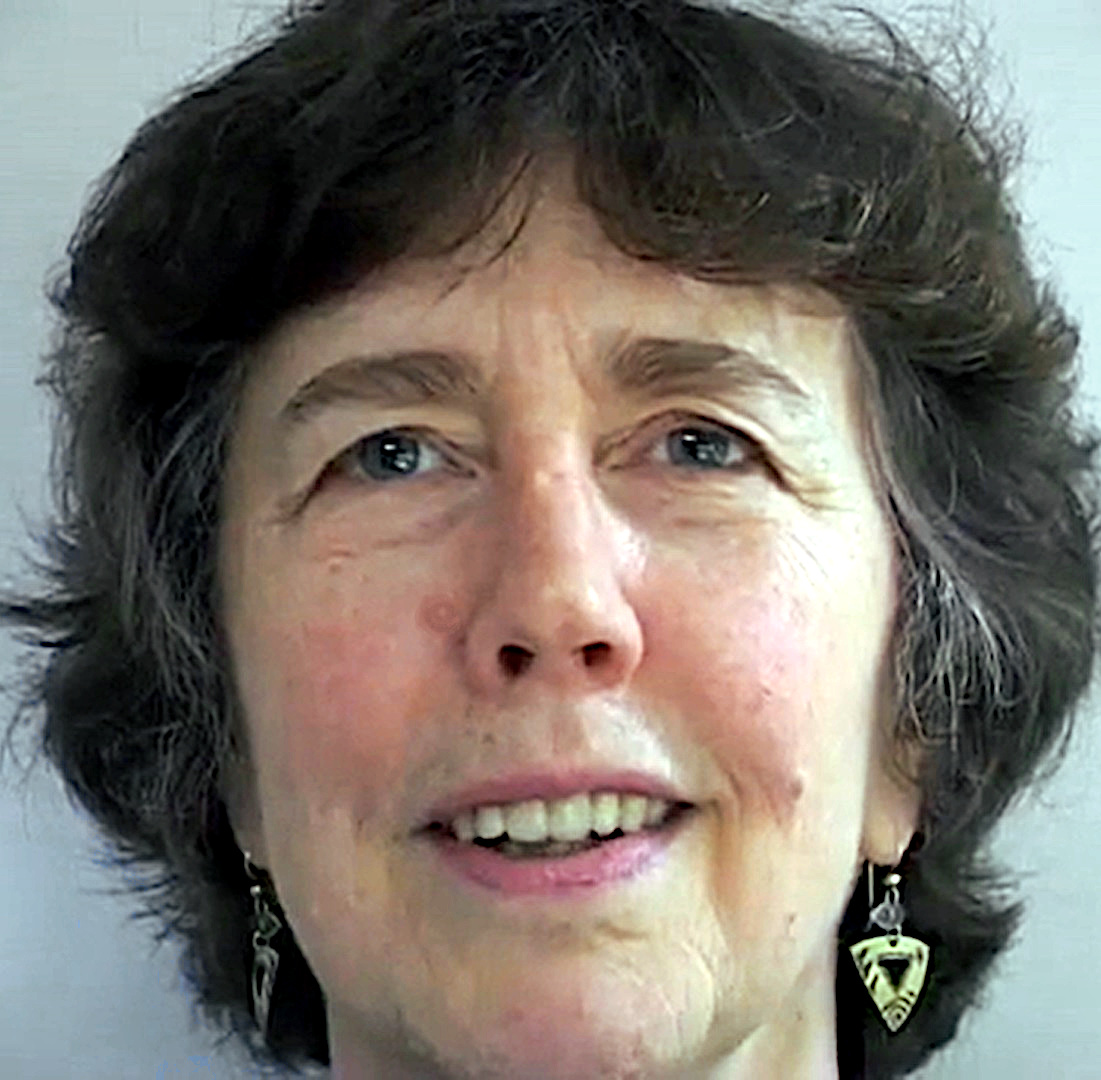
Joan Tower ca. 2002–05

Made in America is an orchestral composition in one movement by the American composer Joan Tower. The work was jointly commissioned by the League of American Orchestras and Meet the Composer. It was first performed in Glens Falls, New York by the Glens Falls Symphony Orchestra in October 2005.

== Composition ==
Made in America is composed in a single movement and has a duration of roughly 13 minutes. The main theme of the work is based on the song "America the Beautiful." Tower described the inspiration for the piece in the score program notes, writing:

I crossed a fairly big bridge at the age of nine when my family moved to South America (La Paz, Bolivia), where we stayed for nine years. I had to learn a new language, a new culture, and how to live at 13,000 feet! It was a lively culture with many saints' days celebrated through music and dance, but the large Inca population in Bolivia was generally poor and there was little chance of moving up in class or work position. When I returned to the United States, I was proud to have free choices, upward mobility, and the chance to try to become who I wanted to be. I also enjoyed the basic luxuries of an American citizen that we so often take for granted: hot running water, blankets for the cold winters, floors that are not made of dirt, and easy modes of transportation, among many other things. So when I started composing this piece, the song "America the Beautiful" kept coming into my consciousness and eventually became the main theme for the work. The beauty of the song is undeniable and I loved working with it as a musical idea. One can never take for granted, however, the strength of a musical idea — as Beethoven (one of my strongest influences) knew so well. This theme is challenged by other more aggressive and dissonant ideas that keep interrupting, unsettling it, but "America the Beautiful" keeps resurfacing in different guises (some small and tender, others big and magnanimous), as if to say, "I'm still here, ever changing, but holding my own." A musical struggle is heard throughout the work. Perhaps it was my unconscious reacting to the challenge of how do we keep America beautiful.

=== Instrumentation ===
The work is scored for an orchestra comprising two flutes (doubling piccolo), two oboes, two clarinets, two bassoons, two horns, two trumpets, trombone, timpani, percussion, and strings.

== Reception ==
Made in America has received praise from music critics. Allan Kozinn of The New York Times praised the work, remarking:

The piece is a celebration of America, as the title suggests, with fragments of "America the Beautiful" as a leitmotif. The idea is charmingly antiquated, the kind of thing composers did regularly in the 1940s. That said, "Made in America" is not chest-thumping jingoism. Its triumphal moments are offset by dark, ominous stretches. The quotations from "America the Beautiful" peek through these tense sections as affirmations — often gentle ones — that the country's ideals will prevail. Yet the work ends ambiguously, with the future in question.

A recording of the work, performed by Leonard Slatkin and the Nashville Symphony, won the 2008 Grammy Award for Best Classical Contemporary Composition, in addition to the Grammy Awards for Best Classical Album and Best Orchestral Performance.
