= Fanfare for the Common Man =

1942 musical work by Aaron Copland

- by Aaron Copland
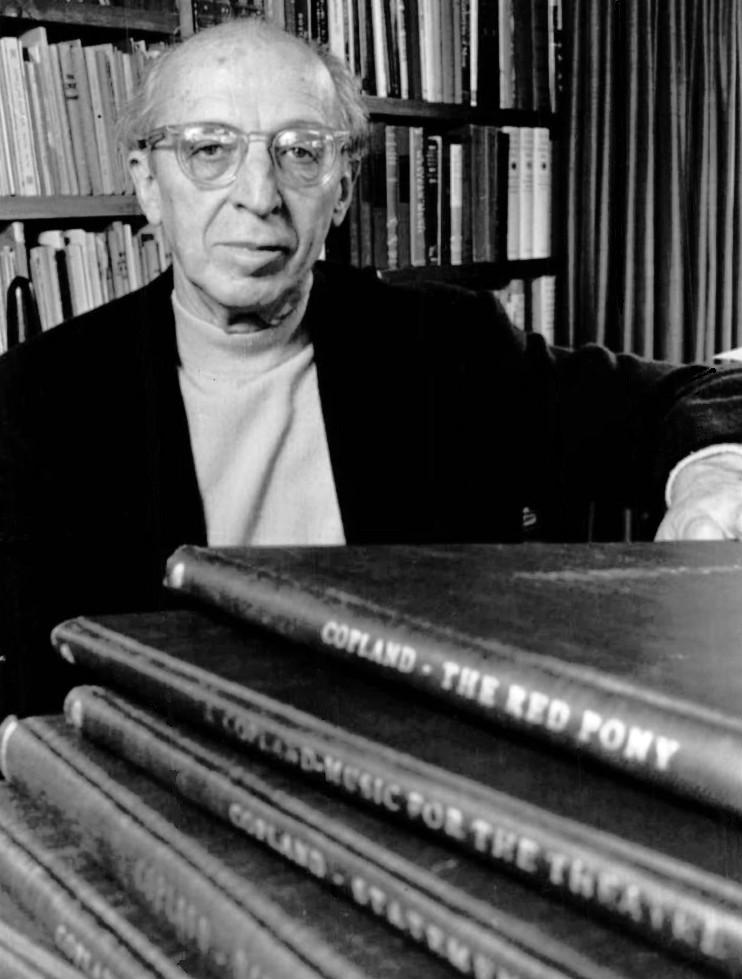
- Copland in his creative office, c.1960
- Form: Fanfare
- Composed: 1942
- Dedication: Eugene Goossens
- Duration: 4 minutes ca.
- Scoring: Brass; Percussion

Premiere
- Date: March 12, 1943
- Location: Cincinnati Music Hall

Audio sample
- Sample from Fanfare for the Common Man performed by the San Francisco Symphony Orchestra, Michael Tilson Thomas (conductor): file; help

Fanfare for the Common Man is a musical work by the American composer Aaron Copland. It was written in 1942 for the Cincinnati Symphony Orchestra (which premiered it on March 12, 1943) under conductor Eugene Goossens and was inspired in part by a speech made earlier that year by then American Vice President, Henry A. Wallace, in which Wallace proclaimed the dawning of the "Century of the Common Man".

Several alternative versions have been made and fragments of the work have appeared in many subsequent U.S. and British cultural productions, such as in the musical scores of films. In June 2026, CBS News included the work in its list of the 250 essential American songs of the past 250 years.

== Instrumentation ==
This fanfare is written for the following instruments:

- four French horns (in F)
- three trumpets (in B♭)
- three trombones
- tuba
- timpani
- bass drum
- tam-tam

== Fanfare ==
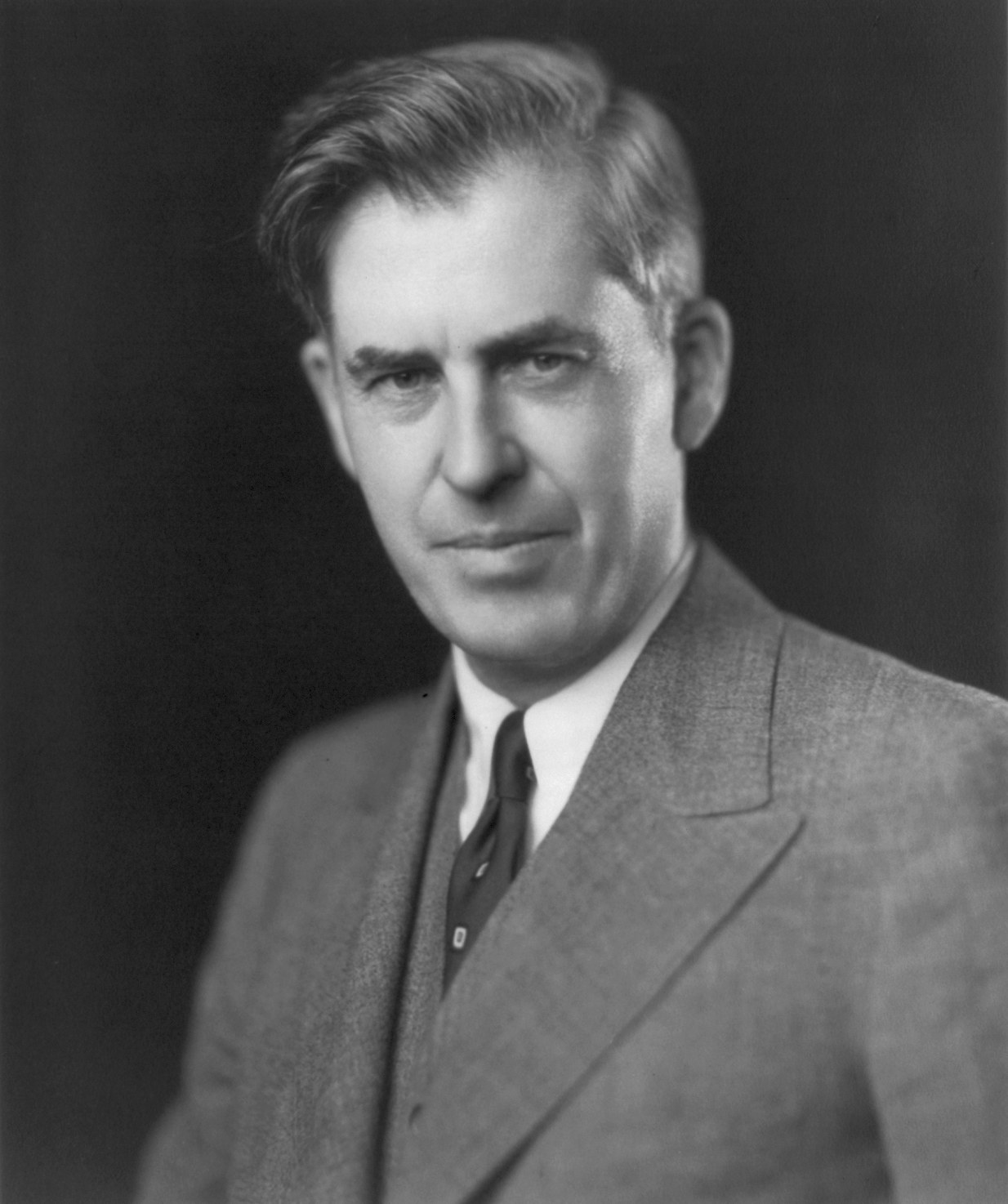
Henry A. Wallace's speech proclaiming the "Century of the Common Man" inspired Copland's fanfare.

Copland, in his autobiography, wrote of the request: "Eugene Goossens, conductor of the Cincinnati Symphony Orchestra, had written to me at the end of August about an idea he wanted to put into action for the 1942–43 concert season. During World War I he had asked British composers for a fanfare to begin each orchestral concert. It had been so successful that he thought to repeat the procedure in World War II with American composers". A total of 10 fanfares were written at Goossens's behest, but Copland's is the only one which remains in the standard repertoire.

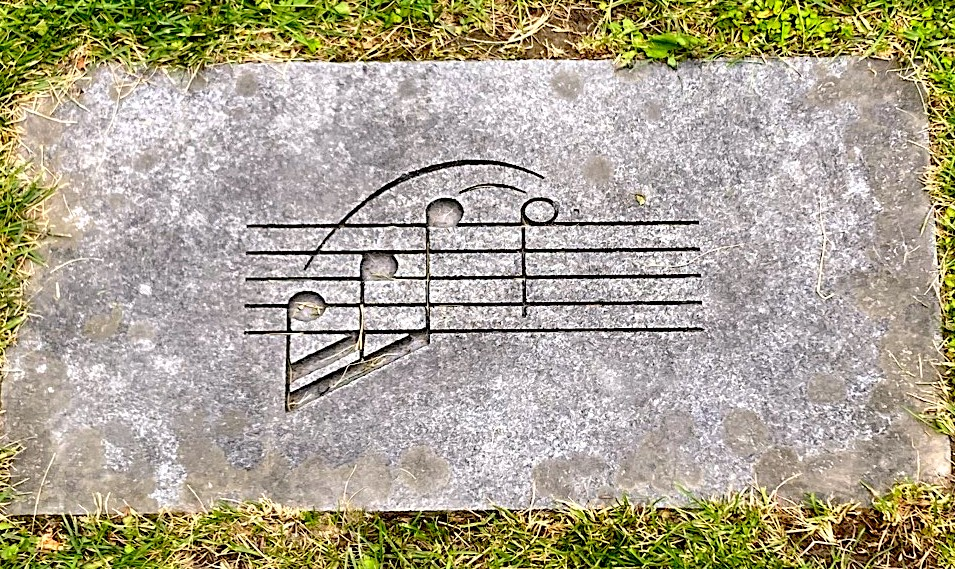
Initial trumpet notes from Fanfare for the Common Man, Copland Memorial Garden, Tanglewood

It was written in response to the U.S. entry into World War II and was inspired in part by a famous 1942 speech in which vice president Henry A. Wallace proclaimed the dawning of the "Century of the Common Man".

Goossens had suggested titles such as Fanfare for Soldiers, or sailors or airmen, and he wrote that "[i]t is my idea to make these fanfares stirring and significant contributions to the war effort ..." Copland considered several titles including Fanfare for a Solemn Ceremony and Fanfare for Four Freedoms; to Goossens's surprise, however, Copland titled the piece Fanfare for the Common Man. Goossens wrote, "Its title is as original as its music, and I think it is so telling that it deserves a special occasion for its performance. If it is agreeable to you, we will premiere it 12 March 1943 at income tax time". Copland's reply was "I [am] all for honoring the common man at income tax time".

Copland later used the fanfare as the main theme of the fourth movement of his Third Symphony (composed between 1944 and 1946).

== In television and other media ==
The theme song for the Star Trek: Deep Space Nine television series that was in syndication during 1993–1999 has much in common with Fanfare for the Common Man.

The fanfare was performed in the opening moments of the April 19, 2000, dedication ceremony of the Oklahoma City National Memorial.

On September 21, 2012, "Fanfare" was played at Los Angeles International Airport as the Space Shuttle Endeavour touched down after its final flight.

On May 15, 2014, it was played by the New York Philharmonic at the dedication of the 9/11 Museum in lower Manhattan.

In February 2015, "Fanfare for the Common Man" featured as theme music for the 65th Italian Song Festival.

On September 26, 2015, it was played at Independence Hall in Philadelphia as Pope Francis came outside to make a speech on religious freedom, which he delivered from the lectern used by Abraham Lincoln to deliver the Gettysburg Address.

== Alternative versions and inspirations ==
Copland's fanfare was performed by British prog-rock band Emerson, Lake & Palmer on their 1977 album Works Volume 1. The track became one of the band's biggest hits when an edited version was released as a single that year. It peaked at No. 2 in the UK. Keith Emerson had long been an admirer of Copland's Americana style, previously using Copland's Hoedown on the band's Trilogy album in 1972.

Queen's 1977 single "We Will Rock You" incorporated elements of the Fanfare's melody and rhythmic motives.

Joan Tower's Fanfare for the Uncommon Woman is directly inspired by Copland's work and employs similar instrumentation.

Mannheim Steamroller also has a version on its American Spirit album. On August 28, 2010, it was played at the beginning of Glenn Beck's Restoring Honor rally.
