= Stroke (composition) =

Orchestral composition by Joan Tower

- by Joan Tower
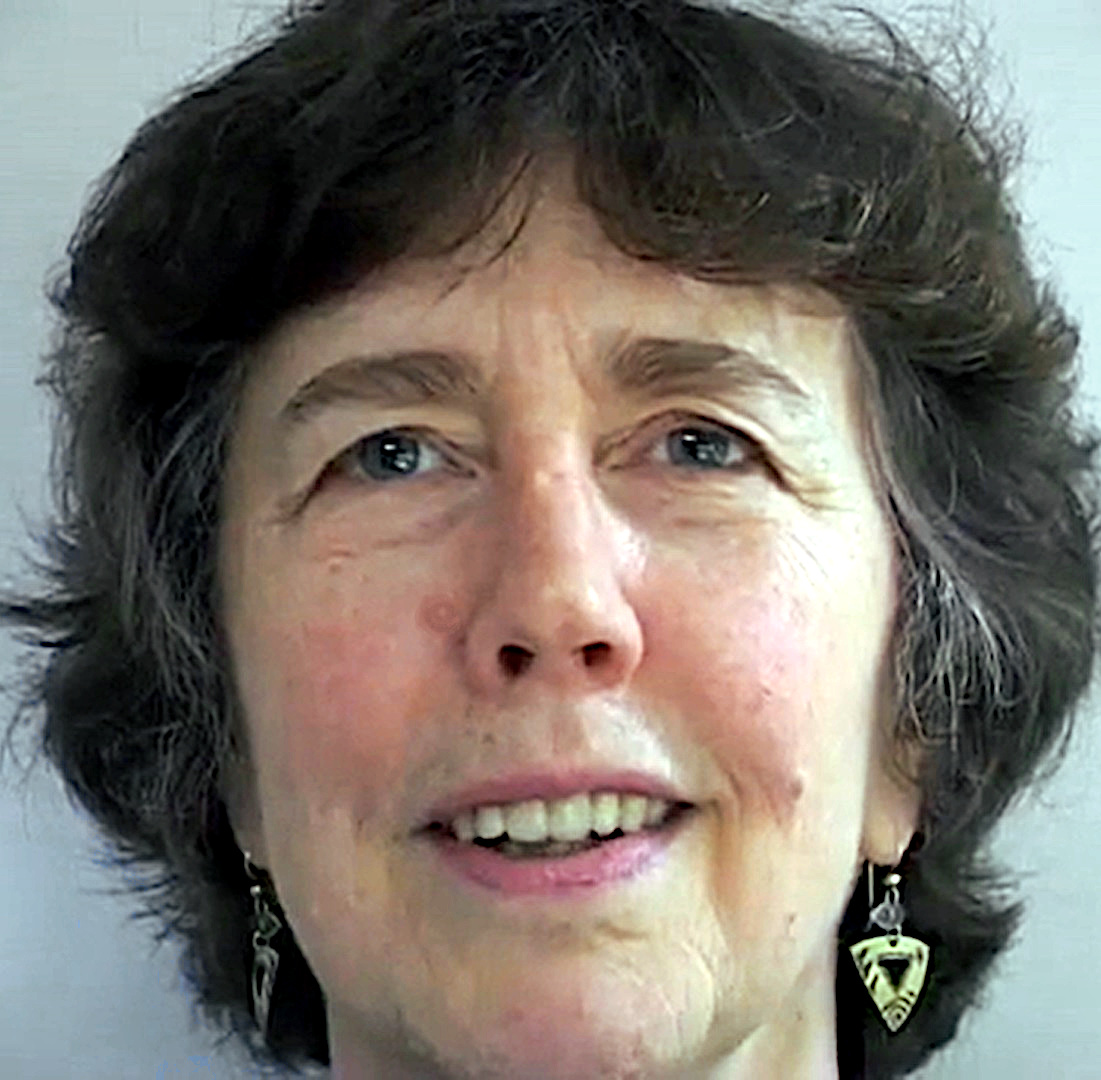
- Joan Tower ca. 2002–05
- Commissioned by: Pittsburgh Symphony Orchestra
- Dedication: George Tower
- Duration: 17 minutes
- Movements: 1

Premiere
- Date: May 13, 2011
- Location: Heinz Hall, Pittsburgh, Pennsylvania, U.S..
- Conductor: Manfred Honeck
- Performers: Pittsburgh Symphony Orchestra

Stroke is an orchestral composition by the American composer Joan Tower. The work was commissioned by the Pittsburgh Symphony Orchestra and is dedicated to the composer's brother, who suffered from a debilitating stroke in 2008. It was first performed in Pittsburgh on May 13, 2011, by the Pittsburgh Symphony Orchestra under the conductor Manfred Honeck.

== Composition ==
Stroke has a duration of roughly 17 minutes and is composed in one continuous movement. Tower dedicated the piece to her younger brother George, who suffered a stroke in 2008 at the age of 60 that left the left side of his body paralyzed. She wrote in the score program notes:

The horrific journey of the aftermath of a serious stroke consists of many different emotional stages: crying, anger, anxiety and depression. The huge adjustment of the mind and the DNA of the body requires a strong resilience of emotion and a large amount of mental discipline to adapt to a body that can no longer do the things it did before. The positive side of this experience (and alternate meaning of the word "stroke") is one of occasional but welcomed rests of peace and deep love that become more pronounced as the stroke victim adjusts to his new reality. I tried to depict these extreme emotions through the musical journey of my 17-minute piece. Inside a dramatic and often loud steady beat (of the heart) surrounded by waves of fast notes (which veer between "anxious" and "joyful"), there are five slower (and "softer") solos for horn, bassoon, violin, clarinet and trumpet where more "peaceful" surroundings come forward.

Tower concluded, "Stroke is a piece concerned with many emotions, one that hopefully offers a quiet 'hope' at the end. With a stroke, it is hard to tell which way it will go."

=== Instrumentation ===
The work is scored for an orchestra comprising three flutes (doubling piccolo), two oboes, three clarinets, two bassoons, four horns, three trumpets, three trombones (doubling bass trombone), tuba, timpani, three percussionists, piano, and strings.

== Reception ==
Reviewing a recording of Stroke, the music critic Leslie Wright called it "a very well constructed piece that grips one throughout its nearly 20-minute length." He added, "I am quite impressed with this work and think it deserves a place on any contemporary programme, especially if it were performed as well as it is here."

== Recording ==
The Nashville Symphony launched a Kickstarter campaign on August 23, 2013, to raise $15,500 for a recording of Stroke, in addition to Tower's Chamber Dance and her Violin Concerto, to commemorate the composer's 75th birthday. The campaign closed on September 22, 2013, having successfully raised $15,585. The recording was released through Naxos Records in May 2015 and was subsequently nominated for the 2016 Grammy Award for Best Classical Contemporary Composition.
