= Island Prelude =

Composition for oboe by Joan Tower

Island Prelude is a chamber work composed by Joan Tower in 1988. Intended for oboist Peter Bowman of the Saint Louis Symphony Orchestra, it is originally scored for solo oboe and string orchestra.

== Background ==
Joan Tower says that she found her inspiration for Island Prelude in oboist Peter Bowman's "exceptionally lyrical playing and also Samuel Barber's wonderfully controlled Adagio for Strings". The piece premiered May 4, 1989, in a performance by Peter Bowman and the St. Louis Symphony Orchestra, conducted by Leonard Slatkin. Island Prelude is also scored for oboe and string quartet, and for woodwind quintet.

As part of a National Endowment for the Arts Consortium Commissioning Grant, the wind ensembles Quintessence, the Dorian Quintet, and the Dakota Quintet commissioned the woodwind quintet version for a series of premieres. The first performance of this arrangement was given by Nancy Clauter and Quintessence at Arizona State University on April 9, 1989.

The string quartet version was premiered on August 23, 1989 by Joan Tower at the Teton Festival in Wyoming. In the woodwind quintet, the Horn takes the role of the bass, the bassoon and clarinet cover the cello and viola, and the flute substitutes for the violin. Tower says that the woodwind quintet version is "heavier" due to the "weight" of the different timbres of the instruments that define the counterpoint and make it "more easily heard." Island Prelude is also a rare example of a woodwind quintet that features one instrument as the soloist throughout the piece. Each version of this piece is about 10 minutes in duration. It is dedicated "with love to Jeff Litfin".

== Analysis ==
Susan Feder's program notes of the St. Louis Symphony recording of this piece include imagery given by Tower regarding the title:

The Island is remote, lush, tropical with stretches of white beach interspersed with thick green jungle. Above is a large, powerful, and brightly colored bird which soars and glides, spirals up, and plummets with folded wings as it dominates but lives in complete harmony with its island home.

Tower's analysis of Island Prelude divides it into three main sections, possibly fitting the sonata form, or at least a variation of the ABA form. The beginning largo section portrays "a very slow-moving consonant landscape that gradually becomes more active and dissonant." The beginning time signature is 5/4 with the quarter note ca. 40 beats per minute. While the quarter pulse is kept constant, the number of beats per measure frequently changes between 5/4, 4/4, 3/4, and 2/4, creating the unpredictable, yet constant terrain. In the quintet, the horn begins the piece on an A, concert pitch. The clarinet and bassoon alternate on pitches A and B while trading triplet rhythms. The oboe begins its solo in measure 10 with sustained notes over the ebbing major 2nds, 4th, and 6ths. The use of consonant intervals maintains the sense of a "consonant landscape". Tower describes the oboe's presence as a "slightly more prominent and melismic line which in turn activates the surrounding held chords." Measure 12 breaks the consonance with the clarinet sounding a G♯ against the A in the bassoon and horn. Dissonant tension builds until the release at measure 15, then the tension begins again (m.21). The counterpoint develops into a second section, or B section, with more complex rhythm and independence of lines.

At measure 54, superimposed tritones move up by half steps to continue the rising modulation. The chromaticism then begins to move downward (m.63), and the oboe recaps the running sixteenth and thirty-second patterns before resting (m.73). Chromatic steps, repetition, and dissonant leaps build to m90 where the oboe begins its flight of complex rhythm over spasmodic chords in the bass. The bass then imitates (m.97) parts of previous rhythmic ideas as the melodic line soars higher, building to measure 108 where all instruments hit a unison on C. A falling fifth pattern in the clarinet, horn, and bassoon brings the range back down and heavy counterpoint continues until the oboe returns on a high E♭ trill (m.129). Three short chords sound under the trill and oboe plays the trill down an octave with each chord, ending on a low E♭.

Here, the oboe begins its cadenza. Fast swooping arpeggios portray the flight patterns of the "large bird" gliding upward against the breeze. The oboe's "two short cadenzas" ascend "in a burst of fast notes that lead into a final, quiet coda." The ending section is a reflection back to the beginning, or A material, and is "very slow, sustained, high, and dissonant." The horn ends on an A, concluding on the same note that it began, and the oboe holds a high B, reflecting back on the opening major second. The other instruments fill in the notes of the ending major ninth chord.
