= Dan Locklair =

American composer

Dan Locklair (born 1949) is an American composer. He holds the position of Composer-in-Residence and Professor of Music, Emeritus, at Wake Forest University in Winston-Salem, North Carolina. His output includes symphonic works, a ballet, an opera and numerous solo, vocal and choral compositions. He is often noted for his sacred music, but has also composed many secular works.

== Early life ==
Locklair was born on August 7, 1949 in Charlotte, North Carolina. Locklair was a professional organist by age 14.

== Personal ==
Locklair is a lifelong pipe smoker and noted collector of pipes. He is also an avid swimmer.

== Education ==
Locklair is a graduate of Mars Hill University. He has a Master of Sacred Music degree from the School of Sacred Music of Union Theological Seminary in New York City. He also holds a Doctor of Musical Arts degree from the Eastman School of Music.

== Career ==
Locklair is a composer, organist, conductor, and Professor of Music. He has been based at Wake Forest University as Composer-in-Residence and Professor of Music since 1982. Prior to Wake Forest, Locklair was Organist/Choirmaster at First Presbyterian Church in Binghamton, NY and Instructor of Music at Hartwick College in Oneonta, New York.

His works are performed in the United States and throughout the world, including in England, Canada, Germany, France, Denmark, Hungary, Poland, Sweden, Korea, Japan, South Africa, Finland and Russia.

"Locklair's music has been premiered and/or performed by such ensembles as the Helsinki (Finland) and Buffalo Philharmonics, the Saint Louis, North Carolina, Kansas City, Omaha, Winston-Salem, Western Piedmont and Salisbury (NC) Symphonies, The Louisville Orchestra, the Gregg Smith Singers, the BBC Singers, the Choir of Royal Holloway (UK), the St. Thomas Choir of Men and Boys (NY City), the Cathedral Choral Society (Washington, DC), the Pittsburgh New Music Ensemble, the Elmer Iseler Singers of Toronto, the Chicago Ensemble and The Oxford Players (UK), as well as by harpsichordists Igor Kipnis and Jukka Tiensuu, and numerous organists, including Marilyn Keiser, John Scott and Thomas Trotter."

Quentin Faulkner, Associate of the American Guild of Organists, has described Locklair's musical style as "eclectic, rejecting dogmatic adherence to stylistic purity, and cultivating engaging melodic gestures, piquant colors, and striking sonorities" His style has been influenced by Igor Stravinsky, Aaron Copland, and Benjamin Britten.

He first came to US national attention when his piece Constellations: A Concerto for Organ and One Percussion Player (1980) was chosen as one of the finalists for the 1981 Kennedy Center Friedheim Awards.

One of Locklair's pieces, The Peace may be exchanged (from Rubrics), was performed at the funeral service for former President Ronald Reagan at the Washington National Cathedral. It has also been performed at the funerals of President George H.W. Bush and US Supreme Court Justice Antonin Scalia. It was also performed as a part of the ceremonies surrounding President Barack Obama's Inauguration weekend.

As a professor at Wake Forest University, Locklair has taught Composition and Orchestration, as well as Introduction to Western Music and Music Theory.

== Selected compositions ==
- Symphony of Seasons - Symphony No. 1
- Memorial Day (Concert Band Version) from Symphony No. 2 "America"
- Symphony No. 2 "America"
- Requiem - SATB Chorus (divisi), Soloists (SATB), Organ and String Orchestra
- Gloria - SATB, divisi, brass octet and percussion
- Rubrics - A Liturgical Suite for Organ
- Brief Mass - SATB (divisi), a cappella
- Since Dawn - Tone Poem based on Maya Angelou's "On the Pulse of Morning" for Narrator, Chorus and Orchestra
- When Morning Stars Begin to Fall - Tone Poem for Orchestra
- Concerto for Organ and Orchestra
- Windows of Comfort - (Organbooks I and II) for solo organ
- The Breakers Pound - A Dance Suite for Harpsichord
- Concerto for Harp and Orchestra
- Sonata for Flute and Harp
- Sonata for Piano
- Phoenix Processional preceded by Fanfare: A commencement piece used at The Juilliard School of music.
- Phoenix and Again (1984): An overture for orchestra, commissioned by Wake Forest University for its sesquicentennial, premiered 1984 by the Winston-Salem Symphony Orchestra.

== Discography ==
- Dan Locklair: Sing to the World (Secular Choral Works), performed by Phoenix Consort, Pianist Iain Farrington, conducted by Adam Whitmore (Convivium)
- Dan Locklair: From East to West & Other Choral Works, The Choir of Royal Holloway, conducted by Rupert Gough, with organist David Goode and the Onyx Brass (Convivium)
- Dan Locklair: Requiem, performed by The Choir of Royal Holloway, Organist Martin Baker and the Southern Sinfonia, conducted by Rupert Gough (Convivium)
- Dan Locklair Symphony No.2, "America", Slovak National Symphony Orchestra, led by Kirk Trevor and Michael Roháč. Organ soloist is Peter Mikula (Naxos)
- Dan Locklair: Gloria, Winchester College Chapel Choir with the Portsmouth Grammar School Chamber Choir, led by Malcolm Archer (Convivium)
- Tapestries – Choral Music of Dan Locklair, Bel Canto Company and The Choral Art Society (MSR)
- Music of Dan Locklair, Marilyn Keiser, organ (Loft/Gothic)
- Dan Locklair: Symphony of Seasons, Kirk Trevor, Jacquelyn Bartlett, and the Slovak Radio Symphony Orchestra (Naxos)
- Dan Locklair: Orchestral Music, Josef Zsapka, guitar; Gregory D'Agostino, organ Kirk Trevor, conductor; Slovak Radio Symphony Orchestra (Albany)
- Dan Locklair: Chamber Works, Mallarmé Chamber Players and others (Albany)
- Windows of Comfort (Organ Books I & II complete), Marie Rubis Bauer, organ (FPC)

== Awards ==
Locklair has received the following awards:

- 2025 American Prize Ernst Bacon Memorial Award
- 1996 AGO Composer of the Year by the American Guild of Organists
- Aliénor Award for harpsichord composition
- New Music Award from the Omaha Symphony Society
- Two North Carolina Composer Fellowship Awards
- Top Barlow International Competition Award for 1989;
- 1996 AGO composer of the year by the American Guild of Organists
- Consecutive ASCAP Awards since 1981
