= Peter Kolkay =

American bassoonist

Peter Kolkay is an American bassoonist. In 2002, he was awarded First Prize at the Concert Artists Guild International Competition, and was the recipient of a 2004 Avery Fisher Career Grant.

Kolkay is a member of the Chamber Music Society of Lincoln Center and the IRIS Orchestra in Germantown, TN. He serves as Associate Professor of Bassoon at the Blair School of Music at Vanderbilt University.

Kolkay has premiered new compositions by:

- Judah Adashi
- Elliott Carter
- Katherine Hoover
- Harold Meltzer
- Russell Platt
- John Fitz Rogers
- Charles Wuorinen

He recently performed the world premiere of Joan Tower's bassoon concerto, Red Maple, with the South Carolina Philharmonic, as well as new work for solo bassoon by Gordon Beeferman in February 2015.

His first solo CD, called BassoonMusic was released in 2011 on CAG Records and spotlights works by 21st-century American composers. The BMI Foundation awarded Kolkay the Carlos Surinach Prize for outstanding service to American music by an emerging artist.

Kolkay holds a doctorate degree from Yale University where he studied with Frank Morelli, and a master's degree from the Eastman School of Music, where he was a student of John Hunt (bassoonist) and Jean Barr. Born in Naperville, IL, Kolkay was awarded a bachelor's degree in 1998 from Lawrence University in Appleton, WI, studying with Monte Perkins.
