= Da Capo Chamber Players =

American music ensemble

The Da Capo Chamber Players are an American contemporary music "Pierrot ensemble," founded in 1970. Winners of the Naumburg Award in 1973, its founding members included composer/pianist Joan Tower, violinist Joel Lester (former dean of Mannes College of Music), and flutist Patricia Spencer. The current members are Curtis Macomber, violin; Chris Gross, cello; Steve Beck, piano; Patricia Spencer, flute; and Meighan Stoops, clarinet.

The Da Capo Chamber Players have commissioned over 100 works from composers such as Joan Tower, John Harbison, Chinary Ung, George Perle, Shulamit Ran, Philip Glass, Mohammed Fairouz, Kyle Gann, Roberto Carnevale, Milton Babbitt, Martin Bresnick, and David Lang among others. In recent years, Da Capo has established active creative relationships with prominent Russian contemporary composers, and the ensemble regularly visits Russia for performances and master classes.

Da Capo has been in residence at Bard College since 1982, and since 2006 have been the ensemble-in-residence with the Bard Conservatory. The ensemble has released recordings on labels such as Bridge, New World, CRI, and Innova.

== Recordings ==
- Dreamtigers: Chamber Music by Judith Shatin (2004)
- Chamber Music of Shulamit Ran (1995)
- Joan Tower: Chamber & Solo Works (1994)
- Arnold Schoenberg: Pierrot Lunaire (1992)
