= Morihiko Nakahara =

Japanese conductor

Morihiko Nakahara (Nakahara Morihiko; born November 28, 1975) is a Japanese conductor.

Born in Kagoshima Prefecture, Japan, Nakahara is the music director and conductor at the South Carolina Philharmonic, and resident conductor of the Spokane Symphony. Nakahara received a Master of Music degree in instrumental conducting from the University of Cincinnati College-Conservatory of Music, where he studied with Rodney Winther. In 1998 he received a Bachelor of Music degree in music education from Andrews University. He has done additional conducting studies with Larry Rachleff, Mark Gibson, Jerry Junkin, and Alan Mitchell.

Nakahara was featured in the American Symphony Orchestra League's National Conductor Preview in March 2005. An advocate of new music, Nakahara has collaborated with notable contemporary composers as Steve Reich, Michael Torke, Augusta Read Thomas, Azio Corghi, Menachem Zur, and Yasuhide Ito.

Nakahara regularly appears on the Masterworks, Pops, and Sunset Symphony series and was appointed as artistic director of educational and outreach concerts with the Spokane Symphony Orchestra. In addition, he has been a clinician, guest conductor, and speaker at various educational institutions throughout the Inland Northwest.

Nakahara was formerly music director and conductor of the Holland Symphony Orchestra in Holland, Michigan. The 2006–2007 season marked his last season with the Holland Symphony Orchestra.

In the 2006–07 season, Nakahara held the Bruno Walter Associate Conductor Chair. Nakahara is one of two chosen for this award.

In April 2008, Nakahara was named the music director of the South Carolina Philharmonic, based in Columbia. His appointment took effect with the 2008–2009 season.

In 2017, Nakahara was named assistant professor and director of Orchestral Studies at the University of Massachusetts Amherst Department of Music, where he leads the UMass Symphony Orchestra.

Preceded by Mihai Craioveanu	Music Director, Holland Symphony Orchestra; 2001–2007	Succeeded by incumbent
Preceded by Fabio Costa	Associate Conductor, Spokane Symphony; 2003–present	Succeeded by incumbent
