= Barlow Endowment =

The Barlow Endowment for Music Composition is a scholarship established in September 1983 through the generosity of Milton A. and Gloria Barlow. Motivated by their love of music, the Barlows presented a substantial gift to Brigham Young University, engendering and supporting excellence in musical composition through the university and the BYU College of Fine Arts and Communications.

The Barlow Endowment Board of Directors and Board of Advisors have subsequently been engaged in employing the proceeds of the Endowment to support four programs: The Barlow Prize, General Commissions, LDS Composer Commissions, and Education Grants.."

Every year, the Endowment hosts an international composition competition. Applications from across the globe are accepted and reviewed by a panel of musicians. The winners are selected and commissioned to compose new works during the next year.

== Barlow prize ==
Each year, the Barlow Endowment selects a genre for the Barlow Prize. Arrangements are made for a piece to be composed for and performed by ensembles who specialize in that genre.

The 15- to 20-minute work is expected to meet the highest artistic requirements for the medium. Additional specifications for the work will be negotiated among the Barlow Endowment, the composer, and the performing consortium.

== General commissions ==
Any composer, (or agent, artist or ensemble applying on behalf of a particular composer) may submit an application for a general commission. The only requirement is that all requested application materials be submitted together.

Composers applying for a general commission are to submit a request as to how much funding their piece will require, and for whom it will be written.

Composers seeking General or LDS commissions may not apply for both types of commissions during the same year and should submit no more than one proposal to any program.

== LDS commissions ==
Composers who belong to the Church of Jesus Christ of Latter-day Saints (LDS) or any composer willing to address LDS subject matter can apply for an LDS commission.

LDS subject matter would include LDS standard scriptural works, such as the Bible, the Book of Mormon, the Doctrine and Covenants, the Pearl of Great Price, and hymns from the LDS hymnbook. Other texts that address LDS theology would also be considered "LDS subject matter."

Composers applying for an LDS commission are to submit a request as to how much funding their piece will require, and for whom it will be written.

Composers seeking General or LDS commissions may not apply for both types of commissions during the same year and should submit no more than one proposal to any program.

== Education grants ==
The Barlow Education Grants are monies allocated from the Barlow Endowment to the composition faculty of the BYU School of Music. Faculty members use some of those funds to promote and facilitate their own work (copying costs, recordings, travel to premieres or conferences, etc.) and the rest to support the students and their work (via scholarships, travel funds, visiting lecturers and so forth).

== Notable past winners ==
- Samuel Adler
- Matthew Barnson
- Kurt Bestor
- Judith Bingham
- William Bolcom
- Michael Colgrass
- Robert Cundick
- Brian Current
- Mario Davidovsky
- Stacy Garrop
- Daniel E. Gawthrop
- Henryk Gorecki
- Daron Hagen
- Stephen Hartke
- Ted Hearne
- Aaron Jay Kernis
- Lowell Liebermann
- György Ligeti
- S. Andrew Lloyd
- Dan Locklair
- Harold Meltzer
- Haruhito Miyagi
- Tawnie Olson
- Forrest Pierce
- Narong Prangcharoen
- Kevin Puts
- David Rakowski
- Shulamit Ran
- Kurt Rohde
- Bekah Simms
- Christopher Theofanidis
- Augusta Read Thomas
- Joan Tower
- George Tsontakis
- Eric Whitacre
- Mack Wilberg
- Charles Wuorinen
- Robin Haigh
