= Camber =

Camber may refer to a variety of curvatures and angles:

- Camber angle, the angle made by the wheels of a vehicle
- Camber beam, an upward curvature of a joist to compensate for load deflection due in buildings
- Camber thrust in bike technology
- Camber (aerodynamics), the asymmetry between the top and bottom curves of an aerofoil
- Camber (ship), a measure of transversal deck curvature in naval architecture
- Cant (road/rail), the convex curvature of a road surface in road construction
- The curvature of a bow used to play certain string instruments, or the curvature of the fingerboard

Camber may also refer to:

- Camber (band), an emo band from New York
- King Camber, legendary king of Cambria, Wales
- Camber Corporation, a defense contractor in Huntsville, Alabama
- Camber, East Sussex, a seaside village including Camber Sands beach in England
- Camber, the former name of Mihai Bravu, Tulcea, Romania
- Camber of Culdi, a fantasy novel
- NATO reporting name for the Ilyushin Il-86 airliner
- Cambering (geology), the downslope movement of competent strata into a valley
