= Sequoia (composition) =

Composition for orchestra by Joan Tower

Sequoia is an orchestral composition by the American composer Joan Tower. The work was commissioned by the American Composers Orchestra with support from the Jerome Foundation. It was first performed on May 18, 1981, in Alice Tully Hall by the American Composers Orchestra under the conductor Dennis Russell Davies. The piece is dedicated to the concertmistress and first horn player of the orchestra, Jean and Paul Ingraham, respectively. Sequoia was Tower's first major orchestral composition and remains one of the composer's most performed works.

== Composition ==
Sequoia has a duration of roughly 16 minutes and is composed in three continuous movements. The music is abstractly inspired by the genus of redwood coniferous trees called sequoias of the Northern California coastal forests. Tower described her influences in the score program notes, writing:

Long ago, I recognized Beethoven as someone bound to enter my work at some point, because for many years I had been intimately involved in both his piano music and chamber music as a pianist. Even though my own music does not sound like Beethoven's in any obvious way, in it there is a basic idea at work which came from him. This is something I call the "balancing" of musical energies. In Sequoia, that concept is not only very much present in the score but it actually led to the title (which is meant in an abstract rather than a pictorial sense). What fascinated me about sequoias, those giant California redwood trees, was the balancing act nature had achieved in giving them such great height.

=== Instrumentation ===
The work is scored for an orchestra comprising two flutes (both doubling piccolo), two oboes, two clarinets, two bassoons, four horns, two trumpets, two trombones, bass trombone, tuba, five percussionists, piano (doubling celesta), and strings.

== Reception ==
Peter G. Davis of New York gave Sequoia modest praise, writing:

There is nothing startlingly original about Tower's score—in its content, structure, or instrumentation—but surely we are beyond the stage when every fresh statement by a composer must be completely without precedent. This music suggests techniques of Bartók, Stravinsky, Hindemith, Prokofiev, and other past masters, but the influences have been smoothly digested and Tower has unquestionably added a vital voice all her own. [...] What gives Sequoia its expressive individuality, I suspect, is the strong poetic impulse that motivates the notes as they translate a visual image into sound.
