= Harold Meltzer =

American composer (1966–2024)

Harold Meltzer (June 8, 1966 – August 12, 2024) was an American composer. Meltzer was inspired by a wide variety of stimuli, from architectural spaces to postmodern fairy tales and messages inscribed in fortune cookies. In Fanfare Magazine, Robert Carl commented that he "seems to write pieces of scrupulous craft and exceptional freshness, which makes each seem like an important contribution." The first recording devoted to his music, released in 2010 by Naxos on its American Classics label, was named one of the CDs of the year in The New York Times and in Fanfare; new all-Meltzer recordings issued from Open G Records (2017), Bridge Records (2018), and BMOP/Sound (2019). A Pulitzer Prize Finalist in 2009 for his sextet Brion, Meltzer has been awarded the Rome Prize, the Barlow Prize; a Guggenheim Fellowship, and both the Arts and Letters Award in Music and the Charles Ives Fellowship from the American Academy of Arts and Letters.

Among his late works are Vision Machine (2016), commissioned by NewMusicUSA for the Orpheus Chamber Orchestra; Bride of the Island (2016), a song cycle to poems of Ted Hughes commissioned by the Minnesota Commissioning Club for tenor Paul Appleby and pianist Natalia Katyukova; Piano Quartet (2015–16); commissioned by the Boston Chamber Music Society; Variations on a Summer Day (2012–16), a song cycle to the Wallace Stevens poem for mezzo-soprano and nine instruments commissioned by the Fromm Foundation for Mary Nessinger and the Maverick Concerts and its director, Alexander Platt; In Full Sail (2015, 2017), commissioned by Piano Spheres for Nadia Shpachenko; and Fortunes (2015), commissioned by the Roger Shapiro Fund for the Pittsburgh Symphony Orchestra. Among his more often performed chamber works are Sindbad (2003–05), a chamber music theater work for narrator and piano trio, commissioned by Meet The Composer for the Peabody Trio and actor Walter Van Dyk; Aqua (2011), a string quartet commissioned through the award of the Barlow Prize in 2008 for the Avalon, Lydian, and Pacifica Quartets; and Kreisleriana (2012, 2014), commissioned by the Library of Congress for violinist Miranda Cuckson and pianist Blair McMillen. Later projects include a piano concerto commissioned by Brandon Fradd for the Boston Modern Orchestra Project and songs for mezzo-soprano Abigail Fischer commissioned by the Brooklyn Art Song Society.

Founder and co-director for fifteen years of the new music ensemble Sequitur, he lived with his wife and two children in the East Village of Manhattan. He has taught at Amherst and Vassar Colleges, and also taught at the Setnor School of Music at Syracuse University.

== Biography ==
Meltzer was born in Brooklyn, New York and grew up in Long Island, where he studied piano and had instruction in music theory from Morton Estrin. Meltzer graduated from Amherst College, BA (1988), summa cum laude, where he studied composition with Lewis Spratlan, piano with Robert Miller, and bassoon with Frank Morelli. He graduated from King's College, Cambridge, MPhil (1990), where he worked with Alexander Goehr, and then completed his musical education at the Yale University School of Music, MMA (1997) and DMA (2000), where he studied composition with Martin Bresnick, Anthony Davis, and Jacob Druckman and harpsichord with Richard Rephann. Meltzer also studied composition privately with Tobias Picker and Charles Wuorinen. More recently he studied piano (2006–08) with Ursula Oppens.

(Throughout the 1990s, as he studied music, Meltzer also studied law at Columbia University School of Law, JD (1992), and then practiced law at Patterson Belknap Webb & Tyler and then at Meltzer Fishman Madigan & Campbell. He no longer practiced law.)

Meltzer taught at Vassar College from 2005 to 2012 and then was the James E. and Grace W. Valentine Visiting Associate Professor of Music at Amherst College from 2012 to 2013. He lived with his wife and children, Julia Meltzer and Elijah Meltzer in the East Village of Manhattan.

Born in Brooklyn, Meltzer died on August 12, 2024, at the age of 58.

== Awards ==
- 2015 Arts and Letters Award in Music, American Academy of Arts and Letters
- 2015 ASCAP Foundation Leonard Bernstein Award
- 2009 nominated Finalist, Pulitzer Prize in Music
- 2008 Barlow Prize
- 2005 Rome Prize
- 2004 Charles Ives Fellowship, American Academy of Arts and Letters
- 2003 Guggenheim Fellowship

== Selected works ==
- Battle Piece for Two Guitars (2017)
- Bride of the Island for tenor and piano (2016)
- Guangzhou Circle for Chinese instruments and percussion quartet (2016)
- Vision Machine for chamber orchestra (2016)
- Piano Quartet (2016)
- Accidental Wilderness for guitar (2016)
- In Full Sail for piano (2015, revised 2017)
- Fortunes for orchestra (2015)
- Variations on a Summer Day for mezzo-soprano and nine instruments (2012–2016)
- Air and Angels for oboe and string trio (2014, 2017)
- Kreisleriana for violin and piano (2012, 2014)
- from a book of beautiful monsters for soprano, mandolin, and guitar (2013)
- Pacific Beach for SSATBB voices (2013)
- Aqua for string quartet (2011)
- Beautiful Ohio for tenor and piano (2010)
- Privacy for piano and twenty-one instruments (2008)
- Brion for flute, oboe, mandolin, guitar, violin, and cello (2008)
- Toccatas for harpsichord (2005, 2008)
- Sindbad for narrator and piano trio (2005)
- Full Faith and Credit for two bassoons and string orchestra (2004)
- Virginal for harpsichord and fifteen instruments (2002)
- Exiles for baritone, flute, clarinet, violin, and cello (2000)
- Two Songs from Silas Marner for soprano and cello (2000)
- Rumors for solo flutes (1998–99)

== Recordings ==
- Brion, Sindbad, Exiles, and Two Songs from Silas Marner, on Naxos American Classics (Naxos 8.559660), 2010
- Toccatas on Sono Luminus (DSL092174), 2014 (Grammy Nomination, 2015)
- Virginal on Albany Records (Troy 607), 2002
- Rumors on Albany Records (Troy 629), 2002
- forthcoming recording on Bridge Records
- forthcoming recording on BMOP/Sound

== Critical reception ==
Meltzer's 2010 Naxos disc was named one of the best recordings of the year in The New York Times and named to Fanfare Magazine's annual Want List and American Record Guide's Critics Choice List in 2011. In Fanfare, the composer and critic Robert Carl wrote that Meltzer "seems to write pieces of scrupulous craft and exceptional freshness, which makes each seem like an important contribution. Part of the trick (I think) is that Meltzer needs to find a unique take on any piece, and in particular its sound world, before he can write." Carl described Meltzer's style as tending "to feature brightly contrasted colors that simultaneously aren't flashy. Rather, they provide delight in their well-calibrated contrasts one to another. The little low-register piccolo lick at the start of the 2008 Brion is an example—I still can't get it out of my head a few days later. Another aspect I hear throughout is an ability to take simple, clear ideas and enliven them by putting them in a new context. Sometimes this is the aforementioned mix of colors. At other times it's more complex modernist textures. At still others it's a dreamlike archaism; one feels as though one is hearing music from a distant time through a glass darkly. He's also unafraid of repetition, but also not obsessive, as in some Minimalist musics. And finally, there's a lovely recurrent danciness." In a 2011 interview, The New York Times chief music Anthony Tommasini describes himself as a "weighty supporter" of three artists in particular: composer Stephen Hartke, pianist Leif Ove Andsnes, and Meltzer.
