= South Carolina Philharmonic =

The South Carolina Philharmonic is an orchestra based in Columbia, South Carolina, USA. Performances are held at the Koger Center for the Arts in Columbia. The current concertmaster is Mary Lee Taylor Kinosian. The orchestra was founded in 1963.

== 2007/8 season ==
The orchestra's 2007/2008 season consisted of seven performances from 22 September to 5 April. Seven guest conductors (candidates for the vacant position of music director) conducted the philharmonic in concert.

- Steven Lipsitt (22 September 2007)
- Morihiko Nakahara (13 October 2007)
- Carolyn Kuan (11 November 2007)
- Sarah Hatsuko Hicks (19 January 2008)
- David Commanday (9 February 2008)
- Adam Flatt (15 March 2008)
- Miriam Burns (5 April 2008)

== Music directors ==
- Morihiko Nakahara (2008–)
- Nicholas R.N. Smith (1993–2007)
- Dr. Einar W. Anderson (1982–1993)
- Dr. John Bauer (1980–1981)
- Arpad Darazs (1971–1980)
- Dr. Arthur M. Fraser (1964–1971)
