= Arpád Račko =

Slovak sculptor (1930–2015)

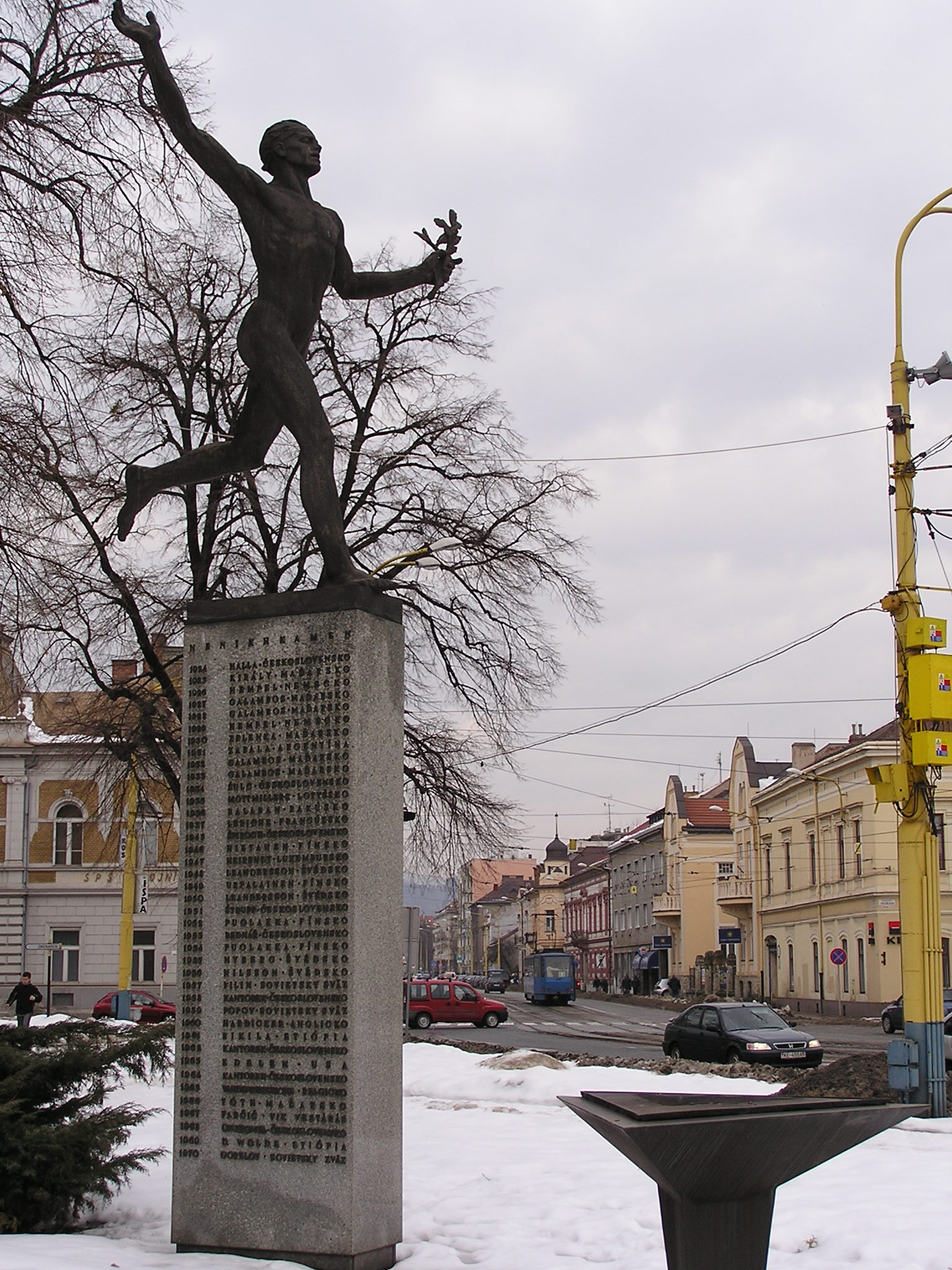
The Marathoner statue

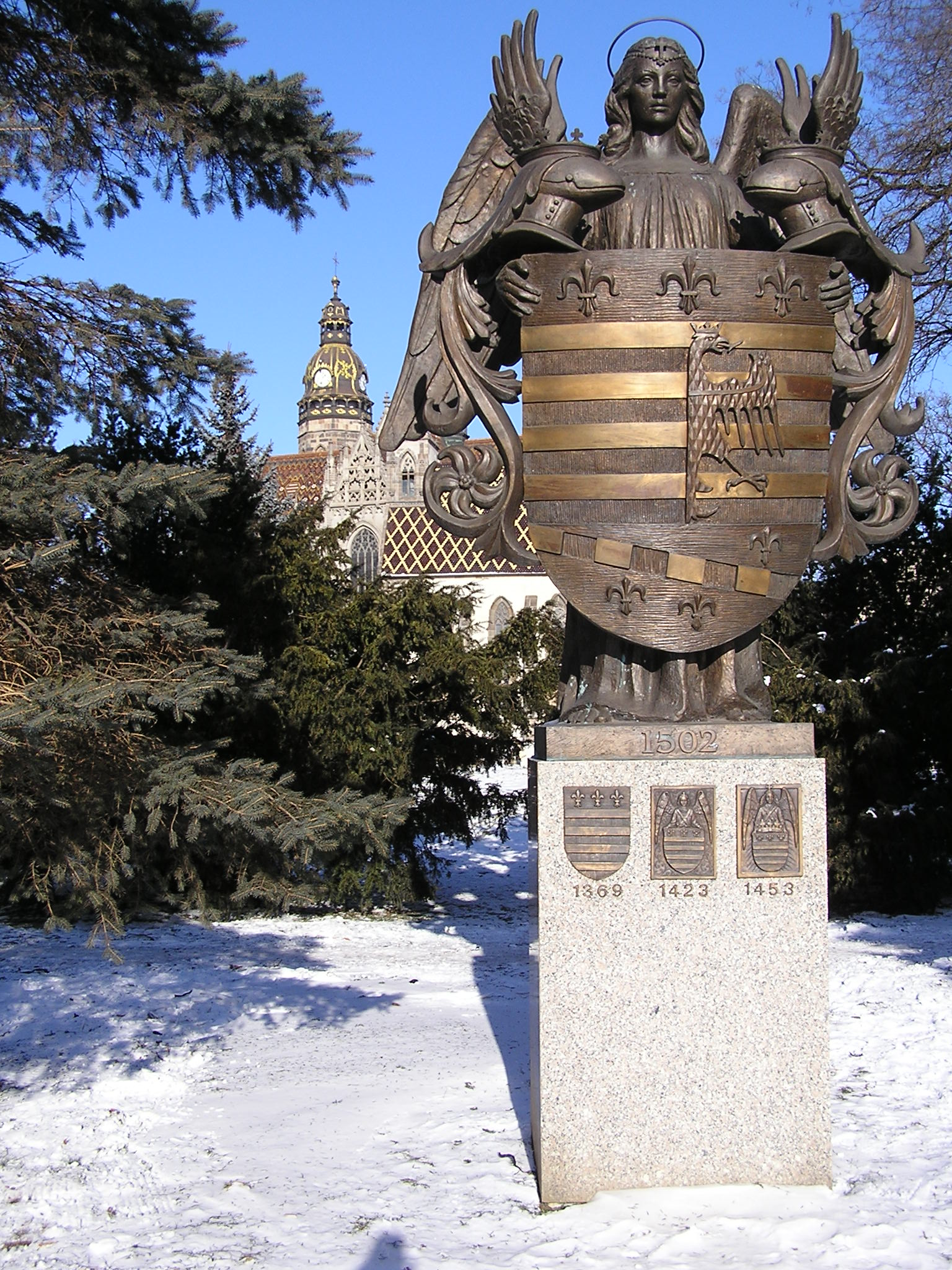
The statue of the Košice's Coat-of-arms

Arpád Račko (July 17, 1930 – January 2, 2015) was a Slovak sculptor.

He was born in Szolnok, Hungary and lived in Košice.

Arpád Račko studied at the prestigious Academy of Creative Arts in Prague, in the art studio of professor Jan Lauda. There has been a big influence of the sculptural work of Czech sculptors Josef Václav Myslbek and Jan Štursa on his work.

Arpád Račko has created dozens of sculptures, plastic arts, portraits and reliefs. The most popular of his works is the Marathoner statue at Námestie Maratónu mieru (The Peace Marathon Square), made in 1959, and the Statue of the Košice‘s Coat-of-arms at Hlavná ulica (Main Street), that he made in 2002. He died in Košice in 2015.
