= Violin Concerto (Tower) =

- by Joan Tower
- Commissioned by: Barlow Endowment for Music Composition; Snowbird Institute
- Duration: 19 minutes
- Movements: 1

Premiere
- Date: April 24, 1992
- Location: Salt Lake City, Utah, U.S.
- Conductor: Joseph Silverstein
- Performers: Elmar Oliveira and the Utah Symphony

The Violin Concerto is a composition for solo violin and orchestra by the American composer Joan Tower. It was commissioned by the Barlow Endowment for Music Composition and the Snowbird Institute. The piece was first performed by the violinist Elmar Oliveira and the Utah Symphony under the conductor Joseph Silverstein on April 24, 1992, in Salt Lake City, Utah. It is dedicated to the violinist Elmar Oliveira. The composition was a finalist for the 1993 Pulitzer Prize for Music.

== Composition ==
The Violin Concerto has a duration of roughly 19 minutes and is composed in one continuous movement. Tower described the composition in the score program notes, writing:

It is really a fantasy for violin and orchestra exploring different kinds of feelings that range from a robust Romantic tune for orchestra to sharply etched rhythmic punctuations to a very soft passage that descends from the highest celestial reaches of the violin. There are two violin duets for soloist and concertmaster that were written as a tribute to Elmar’s brother (also a violinist and one of Elmar's teachers), who died in the fall of 1991. The last section is fast, and takes as its thematic basis a motive from Bartók’s Contrasts for clarinet, violin and piano, an idea that has frequently appeared in other of my works.

=== Instrumentation ===
The work is scored for solo violin and an orchestra comprising two flutes, two oboes, two clarinets, two bassoons, two horns, two trumpets, trombone, timpani, two percussionists, and strings.

== Reception ==
The music critic Leslie Wright called the piece "well constructed and colorfully orchestrated." He added, "I found the concerto convincing overall, though the violin's fast, repetitive solos became a bit tiresome after a while."
