= Strike Zones =

Concerto by Joan Tower

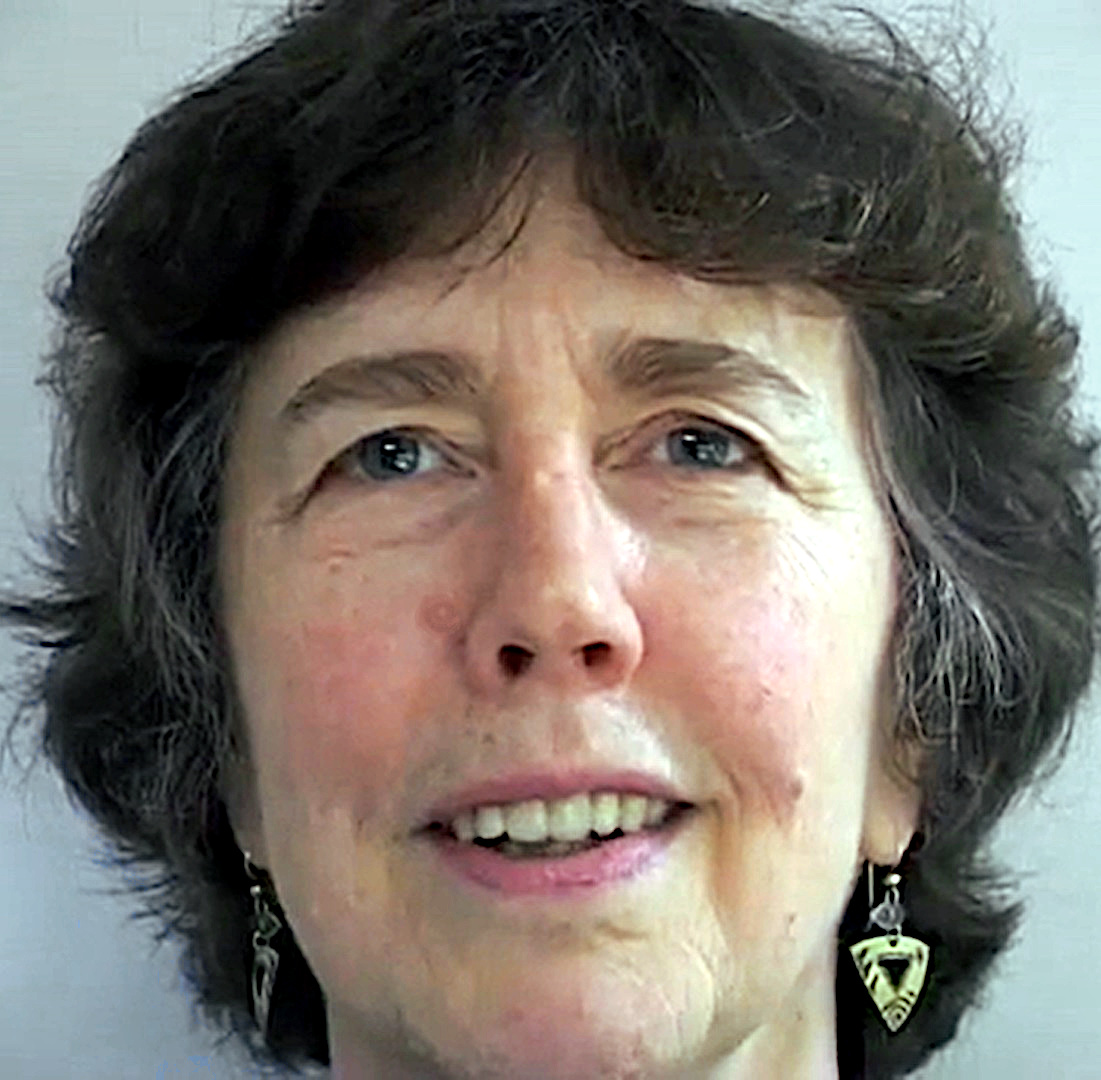
Joan Tower ca. 2002–05

Strike Zones is a concerto for percussion and orchestra by the American composer Joan Tower. The work was commissioned by the National Symphony Orchestra through a grant by the John and June Hechinger Commissioning Fund. It was first performed at the John F. Kennedy Center for the Performing Arts on October 4, 2001, by the percussionist Evelyn Glennie and the National Symphony Orchestra under the conductor Leonard Slatkin.

== Composition ==
Strike Zones has a duration of 20 minutes and is composed in a single movement. Tower described her inspiration for the title of the concerto in the score program notes, writing:

I hesitated to use the title Strike Zones because of its military and baseball connections, but there are no associations with these particular areas, and the title does seem an apt description of the music. It came to mind because most percussion instruments are struck, of course, and in this work I have given each instrument (for instance the vibraphone that opens the piece), or group of related instruments (such as the "family" of cymbals later on), a degree of time and space in order to explore the particular "DNA" or personality of the instruments involved.

=== Instrumentation ===
The work is scored for a solo percussionist and an orchestra comprising two flutes (both doubling piccolo), two oboes, two clarinets, two bassoons, four horns, three trumpets, three trombones, timpani, two antiphonal percussionists, piano (doubling celesta), and strings.

== Reception ==
Reviewing the world premiere, Philip Kennicott of The Washington Post praised Tower's concerto, writing:

Her music can be pallid, but her new percussion concerto, Strike Zones, isn't. Tower focuses the action on the instruments themselves, using them sequentially rather than simultaneously; she explores the sonic possibilities of each one, from the lightest touch to the heaviest battery; she mostly eschews the easy hypnosis of repetitive rhythmic structures.

The Washington Times was more critical of the work, however, saying Strike Zones "left much to be desired, although it is a different kind of work." The review further remarked:

Miss Tower is less interested in pure music in this number than she is in creating orchestral textures, aural canvases upon which Miss Glennie can paint her percussive magic and explore the nuances of instruments that are rarely used expressively. Melodically it does not have much to offer. So the focal point becomes, as it perhaps should, Miss Glennie's artistry, particularly two nice cadenzas she performed on the cymbals and high-hat and on the drum set respectively, accompanied by tinkling percussion instruments played in the balconies. These proved the memorable moments in a work that is otherwise undistinguished in its adherence to late-1960s academic postmodernism.

Paul Griffiths of The New York Times wrote, "If uncertain in form (...), it included many beautiful moments, for the orchestra with or without the soloist." He added:

Late in the piece, two percussionists on the highest balcony struck up a dialogue of tintinnabulations with Ms. Glennie, and these two continued into the conclusion. Rattling on castanets, they precipitated the end, and went on with undiminished intensity as it engulfed them. The whole story of the sorcerer's apprentice was here in a few frightening seconds.
