= Arpad Darazs =

Hungarian-American music educator (1922–1986)

Arpad Darazs (7 July 1922 – 16 December 1986) was a Hungarian-American music educator who was widely known as one of the few in the Western hemisphere as an authority on the Kodály method of choral instruction.

Before he gained wide acclaim for his work at the University of South Carolina, he garnered acclaim with the success of the St. Kilian Boychoir of Farmingdale, New York. The boys' choir not only sang on the Sonny Fox show, but also on a Christmas album with Andre Kostelanetz, as well as with the Leonard Bernstein at the 20th Anniversary Celebration of the United Nations.

== Life and career ==
Darazs was born in Jászberény, Hungary, and graduated from the Franz Liszt Conservatory in Budapest, where he received diplomas in conducting (1944), music education (1946), and teaching applied music in college (1946). He earned a Ph.D. from Columbia University in 1972.

The topic of his dissertation was, "A study of the Zoltan Kodaly approach to music reading and its application to the high school selective choral organization." He was the conductor of the Hungarian State Ballet Chorus and Orchestra, as well as choirmaster for the Hungarian Radio Network. While at the University of South Carolina (1966–1986) he founded the USC Concert Choir. He also conducted the Columbia (SC) Boychoir, as well as the Columbia Barbershop Chorus, and the First Presbyterian Church Choir. Later he was also conductor of the Columbia Philharmonic Orchestra. In 1981 he founded the Palmetto Mastersingers, which is an all-male chorus that went on to win critical acclaim at competitions in Hungary and Wales (1984).

In 1976, the Concert Choir became the first choir from the United States to win the first prize in the International Béla Bartók Choral Competition in Hungary. They repeated this in 1980.

In 1985, he was awarded the Elizabeth O'Neill Verner Governor’s Award for the Arts for his contributions and achievements in and to the arts in South Carolina.

== Death ==
He died on 16 December 1986 from leukemia at the age of 64. He left behind his wife, Piri Darazs; two sons, Bert and Desi Darazs; and a daughter, Judith Darazs Brooks. He is buried in Lexington, South Carolina, USA.

Robert Neese, a student of Arpad Darazs at The University of South Carolina, has conducted The Arpad Darazs Singers, a choir based in Columbia, South Carolina which was formed in honor of the Darazs.
