= Árpád Henney =

Hungarian politician and military officer (1885–1980)

Minister besides the Leader of the Nation of Hungary
- In office 16 October 1944 – 27 March 1945

Personal details
- Born: 24 September 1895 Eperjes, Austria-Hungary
- Died: 21 May 1980 (aged 84) Kitzbühel, Austria
- Party: Arrow Cross Party
- Profession: politician, soldier

Árpád Henney (Hennel; 24 September 1895 – 21 May 1980) was a Hungarian politician and military officer, who served as Minister without portfolio between 1944 and 1945, in the Nazi-dominated Ferenc Szálasi cabinet. After the Second World War he emigrated to Austria. He was a leading and prominent member of the immigrant Hungarist movement until his death.
