= Tambor (Tower) =

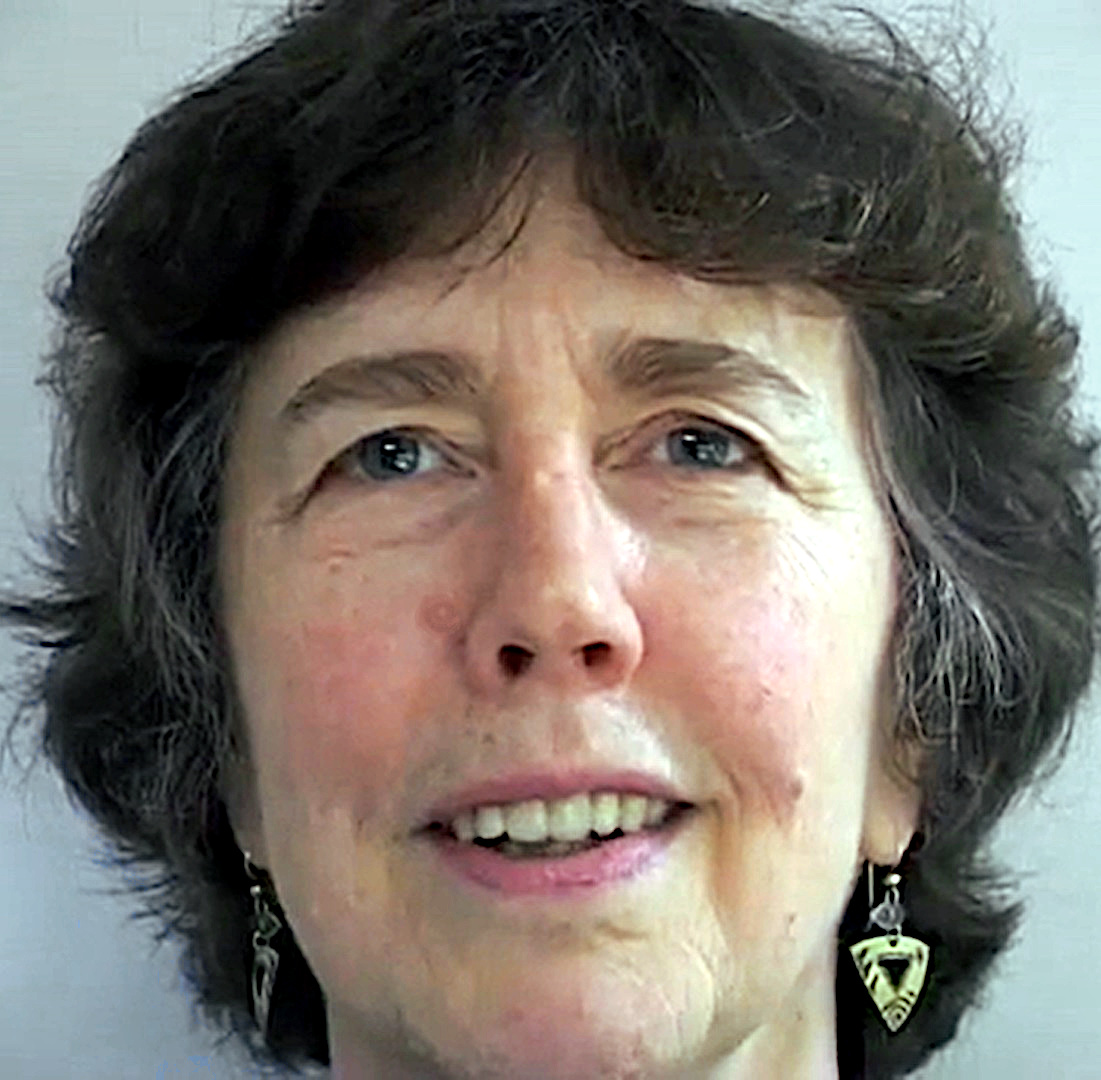
Joan Tower ca. 2002–05

Tambor is an orchestral composition in one movement by the American composer Joan Tower. The work was commissioned by the Pittsburgh Symphony Orchestra and was composed between September 1997 and February 1998. It was first performed on May 7, 1998, by the Pittsburgh Symphony Orchestra under the conductor Mariss Jansons. The piece is dedicated Robert Moir, then artistic director for the Pittsburgh Symphony Orchestra.

== Composition ==
Tambor has a duration of roughly 15 minutes and is composed in a single movement. The title of the piece comes from the Spanish language word for drum, "tambor." Tower's family moved to Bolivia during her youth and she there developed an affinity for percussion instruments. She wrote in the score program notes:

This 15-minute work features the percussion section, whose five members (the timpanist and four others) essentially have three functions inside the orchestra:

1. to 'eyeline,' or underscore the different timbres and rhythms of other parts of the orchestra; 2. to 'counterpoint' other parts of the orchestra.; and 3. to act as soloists in several minor and major cadenzas throughout the work.

What happened while I was writing this piece was that the strong role of the percussion began to influence the behavior of the rest of the orchestra to the point that the other instruments began to act more and more like a percussion section themselves. In other words, the main 'action' of the work becomes more concerned with rhythm and color than with motives or melodies (though these elements do make occasional appearances here and there).

=== Instrumentation ===
The work is scored for an orchestra comprising two flutes (doubling piccolo), two oboes, two clarinets (doubling bass clarinet), two bassoons, four horns, three trumpets, two trombones, bass trombone, tuba, timpani, four percussionists, and strings.

== Reception ==
Tambor has received a mostly positive response from music critics. James F. Cotter of the Times Herald-Record called it "a wonder-working piece that fully engaged all the instruments in its 15-minute version of a musical hurricane." He added that it "sent shock waves through the audience with its blasts of percussion, thundering timpani and orchestral repercussions." Anthony Tommasini of The New York Times gave the piece more lukewarm response, opining, "Though not a great work, it is skillfully executed and effective, and refreshingly honest..." Philip Kennicott of The Washington Post similarly remarked that it gets "high marks for everything but its soul."
