= Silver Ladders (composition) =

Orchestral composition by American composer Joan Tower

- by Joan Tower
- Commissioned by: St. Louis Symphony and Meet the Composer
- Dedication: Leonard Slatkin
- Duration: 23 minutes
- Movements: 3

Premiere
- Date: January 9, 1987
- Location: St. Louis, Missouri, U.S.
- Conductor: Leonard Slatkin
- Performers: St. Louis Symphony

Silver Ladders is an orchestral composition by the American composer Joan Tower. The work was jointly commissioned by the St. Louis Symphony and Meet the Composer while Tower was composer-in-residence with the St. Louis Symphony. It was first performed in St. Louis on January 9, 1987, by the St. Louis Symphony under the conductor Leonard Slatkin. The piece is dedicated to Slatkin with "admiration for his unswerving musical integrity and confidence in presenting the music of his own time."

== Composition ==
Silver Ladders has a duration of roughly 23 minutes and is composed in three movements. The word "ladders" in the title alludes to the use of ascending melodic lines throughout the work.

=== Instrumentation ===
The work is scored for a large orchestra comprising two flutes, piccolo, two oboes, cor anglais, two clarinets, bass clarinet, two bassoons, contrabassoon, four horns, three trumpets, two trombones, bass trombone, tuba, timpani, four percussionists, harp, piano (doubling celesta), and strings.

== Reception ==
Reviewing an eponymous ballet set to the music, Anna Kisselgoff of The New York Times lauded the work, writing, "Like many of her contemporaries, Ms. Tower is strong on dramatic texture. Beginning with a drum roll and chimes, her score varies light percussion with turbulence."

The piece won the 1990 Grawemeyer Award for music, making Tower the first woman and first American-born person to receive the prize.
