= Bernard Holland =

American music critic (born 1933)

- Born: 1933 (age 92–93); Norfolk, Virginia, U.S.
- Education: University of Virginia; Vienna Academy of Music; Paris Conservatory
- Occupation: Music critic

Bernard Peabody Holland, III (born 1933) is an American music critic. He served on the staff of The New York Times from 1981 until 2008 and held the post of chief music critic from 1995, contributing 4,575 articles to the newspaper. He then became the National Music Critic, reviewing concerts, festivals and hall openings worldwide.

Holland was born in Norfolk, Virginia, and studied literature and philosophy as an undergraduate at the University of Virginia. After studies in piano and composition at the Vienna Academy of Music and the Paris Conservatory he worked as a piano teacher. Before joining the staff of The New York Times, he was a freelance critic and music writer for the Pittsburgh Post-Gazette from 1979 to 1980.

In 2016, Holland's book, Something I Heard, was published. The book is a collection of essays and reviews from his almost 30-year career.
