= Arpád Györi =

Slovak ice hockey coach and player (born 1970)

- Born: 26 September 1970 (age 55) Kráľovský Chlmec, Czechoslovakia
- Height: 6 ft 1 in (185 cm)
- Weight: 183 lb (83 kg; 13 st 1 lb)
- Position: Right wing
- Shot: Left
- Played for: HC Košice; TK SKP PS Poprad; HC České Budějovice; HC Železárny Třinec; HK Dukla Trenčín
- Playing career: 1989–2008

Arpád Györi (born 26 September 1970) is a Slovak ice hockey coach and former player. He played as a right winger. He is currently the head coach of HC Tábor of the Czech 2nd liga.

Györi played in the Czech Extraliga for HC České Budějovice and HC Železárny Třinec from 1993 to 1998 He also played in the Tipsport Liga for HC Košice and HK Dukla Trenčín before spending three seasons playing in Germany for EHC Wolfsburg in the Oberliga and the 2nd Bundesliga.

During the 2002–03 season, Györi joined HC Tábor of the Czech 2nd liga and remained a player there until his retirement in 2008. He later became assistant coach for the team and became head coach in 2018.
