= 2024 in classical music =

This article is for major events and other topics related to classical music in 2024.

== Events ==
- 5 January – The Rhode Island Philharmonic Orchestra announces the appointment of Robert Spano as its principal conductor, with immediate effect.
- 6 January – The National Forum of Music (NFM) in Wrocław announces the appointment of Christoph Eschenbach as its next artistic director, effective with the 2024–2025 season, with an initial contract of 5 seasons.
- 9 January – The Cincinnati May Festival announces the appointment of Julia Wolfe as its first-ever festival director.
- 11 January
  - The Cleveland Orchestra announces that Franz Welser-Möst is to conclude his tenure as its music director at the close of the 2026–2027 season.
  - Lincoln Center for the Performing Arts announces Hilary Hahn as the recipient of the 2024 Avery Fisher Prize.
- 17 January
  - Orchestra members, chorus members, and music staff of English National Opera (ENO) announce their intention to take industrial action on 1 February, in protest at plans to make redundant the company's chorus, orchestra and music staff, with subsequent re-employment for six months per year.
  - New Orleans Opera announces the appointment of Lila Palmer as its next general director and artistic director, effective 15 May 2024.
  - Third Coast Baroque announces cessation of operations.
- 18 January – The Fonds Podiumkunsten announces Laurens de Man as the recipient of the Nederlandse Muziekprijs for 2024, the first organist to receive this award.
- 19 January – The Warsaw National Philharmonic Orchestra announces the appointment of Krzysztof Urbański as its next artistic director, effective with the 2024–2025 season, with an initial contract of five years.
- 21 January – The Oregon Bach Festival announces the appointments of Craig Hella Johnson and Jos van Veldhoven as its new artistic partners, effective with the 2025 season.
- 22 January
  - Birmingham Royal Ballet announces simultaneously the departure of Koen Kessels as its music director on 30 June 2024, and the appointment of Paul Murphy as its next music director, effective 1 July 2024.
  - The Orchestre Philharmonique Royal de Liège announces simultaneously the scheduled conclusion of the tenure of Gergely Madaras as its music director at the close of the 2024–2025 season, and the appointment of Lionel Bringuier as its next music director, effective with the 2025–2026 season.
  - The Cincinnati May Festival announces that Steven R. Sunderman is to retire as its executive director as of 2 July 2024.
  - Wigmore Hall announces Igor Levit as the recipient of The Wigmore Hall Medal for 2024, the youngest recipient in the award's history.
- 23 January – The Indianapolis Symphony Orchestra announces the appointment of Jun Märkl as its next music director, effective with the 2024–2025 season, with an initial contract of five years.
- 24 January
  - The Ernst von Siemens Foundation (Musikstiftung) announces Unsuk Chin as the recipient of the 2024 Ernst von Siemens Music Prize.
  - The Turku Philharmonic Orchestra announces the appointment of John Storgårds as its next chief conductor, effective with the 2024–2025 season, with an initial contract through the spring of 2028.
- 25 January
  - The Deutsche Radio Philharmonie Saarbrücken Kaiserslautern announces simultaneously the scheduled departure of Pietari Inkinen as its chief conductor at the close of the 2024–2025 season, and the appointment of Josep Pons as its next chief conductor, effective with the 2025–2026 season.
  - The Ernst von Siemens Foundation (Musikstiftung) announces Bára Gísladóttir, Daniele Ghisi, and Yiqing Zhu as the recipients of the 2024 Ernst von Siemens Composer Prizes.
  - The WDR Symphony Orchestra Cologne announces the appointment of Marie Jacquot as its next chief conductor, the first female conductor ever named to the post, effective with the 2026–2027 season, with an initial contract of 4 years.
- 26 January The Orchestre de chambre de Paris announces the appointment of Thomas Hengelbrock as its next music director, effective with the 2024–2025 season.
- 29 January
  - Equity announces an interim agreement with English National Opera that forestalls previously declared intentions of industrial action.
  - The Lahti Symphony Orchestra announces simultaneously that Dalia Stasevska is to conclude her tenure as its chief conductor at the close of the 2024–2025 season, and the appointment of Hannu Lintu as its new artistic partner, effective with the 2025–2026 season.
  - Boston Lyric Opera announces the appointment of Nina Yoshida Nelsen as its next artistic director, effective 1 February 2024.
  - The Montreal Symphony Orchestra announces that Madeleine Careau is to stand down as its chief executive officer at the close of the 2023–2024 season.
- 30 January – Chattanooga Symphony and Opera announces the appointment of Susan W. Caminez as its next executive director, effective in the spring of 2024.
- 31 January – The Spanish Ministry of Culture and La Comunidad de Madrid announce the appointment of Alondra de la Parra as the new artistic director of the Orquesta y Coro de la Comunidad de Madrid, effective with the 2024–2025 season.
- 2 February – The San Antonio Philharmonic announces the appointment of Jeffrey Kahane as its inaugural music director, effective with the 2024–2025 season, with an initial contract of three seasons.
- 5 February – At the Sankt Burchardi Kirche (St. Burchardi Church), Halberstadt, the newest chord change in the planned 639-year performance of John Cage's Organ2/ASLSP (As Slow as Possible) takes place, with the addition of a d' (D4), the first chord change since 5 February 2022.
- 6 February – Washington National Opera announces simultaneously that Evan Rogister is to stand down as its principal conductor at the close of the 2024–2025 season, and the appointment of Robert Spano as its new music director, effective with the 2025–2026 season.
- 7 February
  - Lincoln Center for the Performing Arts announces that Henry Timms is to stand down as its chief executive officer in the summer of 2024.
  - The Orchestra of St. Luke's announces that Bernard Labadie is to stand down as its principal conductor at the close of the 2024–2025 season.
- 8 February – Kings Place announces the appointment of Sam McShane as its next artistic director, effective 20 May 2024.
- 15 February – The BBC announces a new partnership between the BBC Singers and the Voces8 Foundation for future sustainability of the BBC Singers.
- 16 February – Orchestra members, chorus members, and music staff of English National Opera (ENO) call off their previously intended industrial action for February, after agreement in principle by ENO management to revise their original plans for redundancy and re-engagement of the musicians.
- 20 February – The Wiener Festwochen cancels a previously scheduled performance of Britten's War Requiem to have been conducted by Teodor Currentzis, following protest by Oksana Lyniv at his appearance in the festival in conjunction with a concert to be conducted by her, and his silence regarding the 2022 Russian invasion of Ukraine.
- 22 February – The London Philharmonic Choir announces that Neville Creed is to retire as its artistic director at the close of the 2024–2025 season, and subsequently to take the title of chorus director emeritus.
- 27 February – The Orchestre Philharmonique de Radio France announces simultaneously that Mikko Franck is to conclude his tenure as its music director at the close of the 2024–2025 season, and the appointment of Jaap van Zweden as its next music director, effective with the 2026–2027 season, with an initial contract of five seasons.
- 28 February – The Kimmel Center for the Performing Arts announces that Verizon Hall is to be renamed Marian Anderson Hall, the first performing arts venue ever to be named for Marian Anderson, in a re-dedication ceremony scheduled for 8 June 2024.
- 4 March
  - The BBC Concert Orchestra announces the appointment of Matthew Swann as its next director, effective 27 March 2024.
  - The UK Home Office grants visas to the Afghan Youth Orchestra, after public protest at the Home Office's prior refusal of their visa applications just before the start of their scheduled UK tour.
- 5 March
  - The Royal Philharmonic Orchestra announces the appointment of Sarah Bardwell as its next managing director.
  - Naxos Music Group and Klaus Heymann announce their acquisition of Chandos Records.
  - The Neuköllner Oper announces simultaneously the scheduled departure of Bernhard Glocksin as its artistic director, and the appointment of Rainer Simon as its next artistic director, effective August 2025.
  - The Kronos Quartet announces simultaneously the scheduled retirements of violinist John Sherba and violist Hank Dutt from the ensemble in June 2024, and the appointments of Gabriela Díaz as its new violinist and Ayane Kozasa as its new violist.
- 6 March
  - The National Opera Studio announces the appointment of Eric Melear as its next artistic director, effective July 2024.
  - The Bravo! Vail Music Festival announces that Anne-Marie McDermott is to stand down as its artistic director at the close of its 2026 season.
- 8 March – The first performance since March 1897 of the Octet by Charles Martin Loeffler takes place in Phoenix, Arizona, in a newly prepared edition by Graeme Steele Johnson.
- 10 March – The short documentary film The Last Repair Shop receives the 2024 Oscar for Best Documentary Short Film.
- 12 March
  - The Venice Biennale announces its 2024 Lion Awards for Music:
    - Golden Lion for Lifetime Achievement: Rebecca Saunders
    - Silver Lion: Ensemble Modern
  - Esa-Pekka Salonen is announced as one of the two Polar Music Prize Laureates for 2024.
  - The Columbus Symphony announces that Denise Rehg is to stand down as its executive director at the close of August 2024.
- 13 March
  - Los Angeles Opera announces that James Conlon is to conclude his tenure as its music director at the close of the 2025–2026 season, and subsequently to take the title of conductor laureate.
  - American Youth Symphony announces permanent cessation of operations, effective 15 March 2024.
- 14 March
  - Ars Nova Copenhagen announces the appointment of Sofi Jeannin as its chief conductor, the first female conductor to be named to the post, with immediate effect.
  - The San Francisco Symphony and Esa-Pekka Salonen announce the scheduled conclusion of his tenure as the orchestra's music director at the close of the 2024–2025 season.
- 18 March
  - The Bournemouth Symphony Orchestra announces the appointment of Mark Wigglesworth as its next chief conductor, effective with the 2024–2025 season, with an initial contract of four years.
  - St John's College, Cambridge announces the disbanding of St. John's Voices at the close of the 2023–2024 academic term, with consequent redundancy of its musical director, Graham Walker, and exclusion of soprano undergraduates from Cambridge chapel choral services.
- 22 March – The Pasadena Symphony and Pops announces the appointment of Brett Mitchell as its next music director, effective 1 April 2024.
- 26 March – Anne-Sophie Mutter announces her intention to take a sabbatical from performing in the later portion of 2024.
- 28 March – The Stichting Omroep Muziek announces the appointment of Simone Mejier as its next managing director, effective 1 June 2024.
- 2 April
  - The Chicago Symphony Orchestra announces the appointment of Klaus Mäkelä as its next music director, effective with the 2027–2028 season, with an initial contract of five years.
  - In a report in The New York Times, Klaus Mäkelä states that he is to stand down as chief conductor of the Oslo Philharmonic at the close of the 2026–2027 season.
  - In a report in The New York Times, Klaus Mäkelä states that he is to stand down as music director of the Orchestre de Paris at the close of the 2026–2027 season.
  - The Orion String Quartet performs its final concert at Alice Tully Hall in New York City.
- 3 April – The Metropolitan Opera announces the appointment of Tilman Michael as its next chorus director, effective with the 2024–2025 season.
- 3 April – The Theater Chemnitz announces the appointment of Benjamin Reiners as its next Generalmusikdirektor, effective with the 2025–2026 season.
- 5 April
  - 5 April – The Tokyo Symphony Orchestra announces that Jonathan Nott is to conclude his tenure as the orchestra's music director in March 2026.
  - Britten Pears Arts announces the appointment of Andrew Comben as its next chief executive officer, effective September 2024.
- 9 April – The Oakland Symphony announces the appointment of Kedrick Armstrong as its music director, with immediate effect.
- 10 April – Edo de Waart announces his retirement from conducting.
- 11 April – Bühnen Bern announces the appointment of Alevtina Ioffe as its next chief conductor, the first female conductor to be named to the post, effective in the summer of 2025. In parallel, Nicholas Carter is scheduled to conclude his Bühnen Bern tenure post at the close of the 2024–2025 season.
- 12 April – The Solti Foundation US announces François López-Ferrer as the 15th recipient of the Sir Georg Solti Conducting Award.
- 15 April – The Three Choirs Festival announces that Alexis Paterson is to stand down as its chief executive after the 2024 season.
- 16 April
  - La Scala announces the appointment of Fortunato Ortombina as its next general director, effective with the 2025–2026 season.
  - Welsh National Opera announces the truncation of two weeks from its 2024–2025 season, with the planned elimination of scheduled tours to Bristol Hippodrome in February 2025 and to Venue Cymru, Llandudno in May 2025.
- 18 April
  - The Nordwestdeutsche Philharmonie announces the appointment of Jonathan Bloxham as its next chief conductor, effective with the 2024–2025 season, with an initial contract of three seasons.
  - The Opéra Orchestre national Montpellier announces the appointment of Roderick Cox as its new music director, effective September 2024.
  - The Czech Philharmonic announces that Semyon Byckhov (conductor) is to stand down as its chief conductor and music director at the close of the 2027–2028 season.
- 20 April – The Malko Competition announces the prize winners of its 2024 competition:
  - First prize: Samuel Lee
  - Second prize: Ana Maria Patiño-Osorio (also recipient of the Audience Prize and the Youth Jury Prize)
  - Third prize: Dong Chao
- 24 April
  - Notre-Dame de Paris announces the appointments of Thierry Escaich and Thibault Fajoles to its roster of organistes titulaires, in addition to Olivier Latry and Vincent Dubois.
  - The Iceland Symphony Orchestra announces that Eva Ollikainen is to conclude her tenure as its chief conductor at the close of the 2025–2026 season.
  - The Cincinnati Symphony Orchestra announces the appointment of Cristian Măcelaru as its next music director, with the title of music director-designate for the 2024–2025 season, and fully effective as of the 2025–2026 season.
- 25 April
  - Opera Philadelphia announces the appointment of Anthony Roth Costanzo as its next general director and president, effective 1 June 2024, with an initial contract of three years.
  - The first Arabic-language grand opera to be staged in Saudi Arabia, Zarqa Al Yamama, is premiered in Riyadh.
- 26 April – The Flanders Symphony Orchestra announces the appointment of Martijn Dendievel as its next chief conductor, effective January 2026 season.
- 29 April – The St. Lawrence String Quartet announces that it is to disband at the close of the 2023–2024 season.
- 30 April
  - The Royal Opera House, Covent Garden formally announces a name change for the company to the Royal Ballet and Opera.
  - Joshua Kosman retires as classical music critic for the San Francisco Chronicle.
- 2 May
  - The Los Angeles Philharmonic announces the appointment of Kim Noltemy as its next president and chief executive officer, effective 8 July 2024.
  - The Dallas Symphony Orchestra announces that Kim Noltemy is to conclude her tenure as its president and chief executive officer on 28 June 2024.
- 3 May
  - The Royal Philharmonic Society announces the appointment of Angela Dixon as its new chair, effective 22 May 2024.
  - The Janáček Philharmonic Orchestra announces the appointment of Daniel Raiskin as its next chief conductor, effective with the 2026–2027 season.
- 9 May – The BBC announces the artists for the BBC Radio 3 New Generation Artists scheme during the period of 2024-2026:
  - Julius Asal (piano)
  - Hana Chang (violin)
  - Sterling Elliott (cello)
  - Elizaveta Ivanova (flute)
  - Kleio Quartet (string quartet)
  - Santiago Sánchez (tenor)
  - Emma Rawicz (jazz saxophone)
- 14 May – The Netherlands Wind Ensemble announces the appointment of Brandt Attema as its next artistic leader, effective 1 September 2024.
- 15 May – The Iceland Symphony Orchestra announces the appointment of Barbara Hannigan as its next chief conductor and artistic director, effective August 2026, with an initial contract of three seasons.
- 16 May
  - The Adelaide Symphony Orchestra announces the appointment of Mark Wigglesworth as its next chief conductor, effective January 2025, with an initial contract of three years.
  - The Hamilton Philharmonic Orchestra announces the appointment of James S. Kahane as its next music director, effective with the 2024–2025 season.
- 17 May – The Konzerthausorchester Berlin announces the appointment of Tobias Rempe as its next Intendant, effective in 2025.
- 21 May – English National Opera announces the appointment of Jenny Mollica as its next chief executive officer (CEO), with immediate effect.
- 22 May
  - Le Canard enchaîné publishes an article that accuses François-Xavier Roth of sexting and sexually inappropriate conduct towards other musicians. Roth is replaced as conductor of a concert that evening by Les Siècles at the Théâtre des Champs-Élysées.
  - The Montreal Symphony Orchestra announces the appointment of Mélanie La Couture as its next CEO.
- 29 May – English Touring Opera announces that it is to relocate its headquarters to Sheffield, with the process commencing in the autumn of 2024.
- 30 May – The Dayton Performing Arts Alliance announces the appointment of Keitaro Harada as the next music director of the Dayton Philharmonic Orchestra, effective 1 July 2025, with an initial contract of 5 years.
- 3 June – The Rhode Island Philharmonic Orchestra announces the appointment of Ruth Reinhardt as its next music director, the first female conductor ever named to the post, effective with the 2025–2026 season.
- 7 June – The Warsaw National Philharmonic Orchestra re-announces the appointment of Krzysztof Urbański as its next artistic director, effective with the 2024–2025 season, with an initial contract of four years, revised from the previous January 2024 announcement.
- 12 June
  - The Malmö Symphony Orchestra announces the appointment of Martyn Brabbins as its net chief conductor, effective with the 2025–2026 season, with an initial contract of three seasons.
  - Canadian Opera Company announces the departure of Perryn Leech as its general director, and the appointment of David Ferguson as interim general director, both with immediate effect.
  - The Albany Symphony Orchestra announces the appointment of Emily Fritz-Endres as its next executive director, effective August 2024.
- 14 June – The King's Birthday Honours 2024
  - John Rutter and Roger Wright are each made a Knight Bachelor.
  - Sarah Leonard is made a Member of the Order of the British Empire.
- 17 June – The Bavarian State Opera announces that Vladimir Jurowski is to conclude his tenure as Generalmusikdirektor of the company at the close of the 2027–2028 season.
- 18 June – The New Jersey Symphony announces that Gabriel van Aalst is to stand down as its president and CEO as of September 2024.
- 24 June – Opera Carolina announces the appointment of Shanté Williams as its general director, the first woman and the first person of colour to be named to the post, effective 1 July 2024, in succession to James Meena, who is to stand down as general director and retain his post of artistic director.
- 25 June – The Baltimore Chamber Orchestra announces the appointment of Robert Moody as its next music director, with immediate effect, with an initial contract of three years.
- 26 June – The BBC announces presenter changes at Radio 3 effective April 2025, including:
  - The scheduled retirement of Sean Rafferty from In Tune
  - The naming of Petroc Trelawny as the new co-presenter of In Tune in place of Rafferty
  - The naming of Tom McKinney as the new presenter of the weekday Breakfast programme.
- 28 June
  - The Dallas Symphony Orchestra announces the appointment of Michelle Miller Burns as its next president and chief executive officer, effective 23 September 2024.
  - The Minnesota Orchestra announces the scheduled departure of Michelle Miller Burns as its president and chief executive officer, effective 13 September 2024.
- 30 June – The choir of St Paul's Cathedral features girls as full choristers for the first time in the institution's history, with two girls as part of the Choral Evensong service.
- 3 July – The Dutch Fonds voor Cultuur Participatie (Cultural Participation Fund) announces its newest recipients of multi-year subsidies, where six classical music organisations focused on youth are not included in the most recent portfolio:
  - Prinses Christina Concours
  - Britten voor Jong Muziektalent
  - Nationale Jeugdorkesten Nederland
  - Ricciotti Ensemble
  - Vocaal Talent Nederland
  - Nederlandse Vioolconcoursen
- 4 July
  - The Hong Kong Philharmonic Orchestra announces the appointment of Tarmo Peltokoski as its next music director, effective with the 2026–2027 season, with an initial contract of four years.
  - The Staatstheater Kassel announces the appointment of Ainārs Rubiķis as its next Generalmusikdirektor, effective with the 2025–2026 season, with an initial contract of three seasons.
- 5 July – The city of Cologne announces the conclusion of the tenure of François-Xavier Roth as Gürzenich-Kapellmeister and chief conductor of the Cologne Opera with immediate effect, one season earlier than the previously scheduled tenure conclusion, in light of accusations against Roth of sexting and sexually inappropriate conduct towards other musicians.
- 11 July
  - Welsh National Opera announces the appointments of Adele Thomas and Sarah Crabtree as joint holders of the posts of general director and chief executive officer, effective January 2025.
  - Scottish Ensemble announces that Jenny Jamison is to stand down as its chief executive.
  - Gary Ginstling resigns as president and chief executive of the New York Philharmonic, with immediate effect.
- 12 July – The European Union Youth Orchestra announces the appointment of Iván Fischer as its new music director, with immediate effect.
- 15 July – The Orchestre de Chambre de Lausanne announces the appointment of Dominique Meyer as its next executive director, with immediate effect.
- 16 July – The BBC announces the appointment of Jonathan Manners as director of the BBC Singers.
- 20 July – At Montclair State University (New Jersey, USA), Teatro Nuovo gives the first performance of the opera Anna di Resburgo by Carolina Uccelli since its 1835 premiere.
- 23 July
  - The Northern Chamber Orchestra announces the appointments of Zöe Beyers as its next music director and of Sarah Brandwood-Spencer as its new associate director.
  - The Orchestre classique de Montréal announces the departure of Jacques Lacombe as its artistic director, with immediate effect.
- 24 July – The board of the Monteverdi Choir announces that Sir John Eliot Gardiner is not to return to the organisation.
- 30 July – The St. Louis Symphony Orchestra announces the appointment of Erin Freeman as the next director of the St. Louis Symphony Chorus, with immediate effect.
- 5 August – Lyric Opera of Chicago announces the appointment of John Mangum as its next general director, effective with the autumn of 2024.
- 7 August – Lincoln Center for the Performing Arts announces the appointment of Mariko Silver as its next president and chief executive officer, effective 23 September 2024.
- 8 August
  - The Deutsches Nationaltheater und Staatskapelle Weimar announces that Dominik Beykirch is to stand down as its music director at the close of the 2024–2025 season.
  - Seattle Opera announces the appointment of James Robinson as its next general director and artistic director, effective 4 September 2024, with an initial contract of five seasons.
  - Opera Theatre of Saint Louis announces the departure of James Robinson as its artistic director, effective September 2024.
- 9 August
  - The Tokyo Symphony Orchestra announces the appointment of Lorenzo Viotti as its next music director, effective with the 2026–2027 season, with an initial contract of three years.
  - Chattanooga Symphony and Opera announce the appointment of Ilya Ram as its next music director, effective with the 2025–2026 season, with an initial contract of three years.
- 12 August – The Melbourne Symphony Orchestra removes Jayson Gillham as the scheduled pianist for its 15 August 2024 concert, following remarks by Gillham on 11 August 2024 regarding the deaths of Palestinian journalists in the Israel-Hamas war at the world premiere performance of Connor D'Netto's piano work Witness.
- 14 August – The Media, Entertainment & Arts Alliance releases a statement to protest the Melbourne Symphony Orchestra's cancellation of Jayson Gillham's previously scheduled 15 August 2024 appearance with the orchestra, following Gillham's 11 August 2024 remarks about the deaths of Palestinian journalists in the Israel-Hamas war.
- 15 August – The musicians of the Melbourne Symphony Orchestra (MSO) issue a vote of no confidence in MSO managing director Sophie Galaise and MSO chief operating officer Guy Ross, following the cancellation of Jayson Gillham's previously scheduled appearance with the MSO for that evening.
- 19 August – News reports state that Eberhard Friedrich has submitted his resignation as director of the Bayreuth Festival Chorus, effective 27 August 2024 with the close of the 2024 Bayreuth Festival season, one year ahead of his scheduled retirement.
- 21 August – Royal Swedish Opera announces the appointment of Tobias Theorell as its next artistic director, effective in 2025.
- 22 August
  - The Dutch Ministry of Education, Culture and Science announces Elisabeth Hetherington as the recipient of the 2025 Nederlandse Muziekprijs.
  - The Sarasota Orchestra announces the appointment of Giancarlo Guerrero as its next music director, effective with the 2025–2026 season, with an initial contract of five seasons.
- 24 August – HRH King Charles III announces the appointment of Errollyn Wallen as the next Master of the King's Music.
- 25 August – The Bayreuth Festival announces the appointment of Thomas Eitler-de Lint as the next director of the Bayreuth Festival Chorus.
- 26 August – The Melbourne Symphony Orchestra (MSO) announces, in the wake of the cancellation of Jayson Gillham's previously scheduled 15 August 2024 appearance with the orchestra:
  - The departure of Sophie Galaise as managing director
  - The appointment of Richard Wigley as strategic advisor for the orchestra
  - An independent review of the MSO, to be led by Peter Garrett.
- 29 August – At the 2024 BBC Proms, Anja Bihlmaier conducts the annual Proms appearance by Glyndebourne Festival Opera, of Georges Bizet's Carmen, the first female conductor ever to conduct the annual Glyndebourne Festival Opera Prom.
- 30 August – Opera Australia announces that Jo Davies is to stand down as its artistic director, effective at the end of August 2024.
- 4 September – The first staged performance of the opera Dalinda, composed by Gaetano Donizetti in 1838, takes place at the University of Cape Town, performed by the student company Opera UCT.
- 5 September
  - The Seattle Symphony announces the appointment of Xian Zhang as its next music director, the first female conductor to be named to the post, effective with the 2025–2026 season, with an initial contract of five years.
  - The New Jersey Symphony announces that Xian Zhang is to conclude her tenure as its music director at the close of the 2027–2028 season.
- 6 September – The Omaha Symphony Orchestra and its music director, Ankush Kumar Bahl, announce that Bahl is to stand down from the post at the close of the 2024–2025 season, and that Bahl is to take the title of artistic partner for the 2025–2026 season.
- 9 September
  - Kyiv Camerata announces the appointment of Keri-Lynn Wilson as its new music director, the first female conductor to be named to the post, with immediate effect.
  - Sir John Eliot Gardiner announces the formation of a new orchestra and choir, the Constellation Orchestra and the Constellation Choir, under his leadership.
  - The Colorado Symphony announces the promotion of Peter Oundjian from its principal conductor to its music director, effective with the 2025–2026 season, with an initial contract of four years.
- 12 September
  - Arvo Pärt receives the Royal Philharmonic Society Gold Medal from RPS chair Angela Dixon and RPS chief executive James Murphy at the Arvo Pärt Centre in Tallinn.
  - Wigmore Hall announces the prize recipients of its 2024 Wigmore Hall/Bollinger International Song Competition:
    - 1st Prize: Anja Mittermüller, mezzo-soprano (the youngest-ever winner of the competition at age 20)
    - 2nd Prize: Santiago Sánchez, tenor
    - 3rd Prize: Jonathan Eyers, baritone
    - Pianist's Prize: Jong Sun Woo
    - Special Finalist Prize: Mathilde Orscheidt, mezzo-soprano
- 16 September – The board of directors of Anima Eterna announces the severance of ties with its founder and director, Jos Van Immerseel, on the grounds of repeated aggressive behaviour and failures to meet contractual obligations.
- 18 September – The Royal Liverpool Philharmonic announces that Michael Eakin is to stand down as its chief executive in March 2025.
- 19 September
  - The first modern performance of the recently re-discovered composition Ganz Kleine Nachtmusik, K. 648, by Wolfgang Amadeus Mozart takes place at the International Mozarteum Foundation in Salzburg.
  - The San Francisco Symphony Chorus takes industrial action that leads to the cancellation of the initially scheduled season-opening concert that evening.
- 21 September – The 2024 Leeds International Piano Competition announces its prize recipients:
  - First Prize and the Dame Fanny Waterman Gold Medal: Jaeden Izik-Dzurko
  - Second Prize and the Marion Thorpe Silver Medal: Junyan Chen
  - Third Prize and the Lady Roslyn Lyons Bronze Medal: Khanh Nhi Luong
  - Fourth Prize: Kai-Min Chang
  - Fifth Prize: Julian Trevelyan
- 23 September – The Metropolitan Opera opens its 2024-2025 season with the first performance of the revised version of Grounded by Jeanine Tesori and George Brant, the first opera by a female composer ever to begin the Metropolitan Opera's season in the company's history.
- 27 September – The musicians of the United States National Symphony Orchestra (NSO) take industrial action and initiate a work stoppage at 11:00 local time, the first such action since 1978, after a breakdown in labour negotiations. The NSO management and the NSO musicians reach a settlement by 14:30 local time the same day.
- 30 September – Brandeis University communicates a notice of redundancy and dissolution to the Lydian String Quartet, the resident string quartet at the university.
- 1 October
  - The MacArthur Fellows Program announces its 2024 recipients, which include the violinist and composer Johnny Gandelsman.
  - The Grant Park Music Festival announces the appointment of Giancarlo Guerrero as its next artistic director and principal conductor, with immediate effect, with an initial contract of three seasons.
- 9 October – The Danish String Quartet is announced as the recipient of the 2025 Léonie Sonning Music Prize, the first ensemble to receive the prize in its history.
- 15 October – The Jeunesses Musicales Deutschland awards the 34th Würth Prize to Mirga Gražinytė-Tyla in the awards ceremony in Künzelsau.
- 16 October
  - The New Zealand String Quartet Trust announces the resignations of first violinist Helene Pohl and cellist Rolf Gjelsten from the ensemble, with immediate effect.
  - Houston Grand Opera announces that Patrick Summers is to stand down as its artistic director and music director at the conclusion of the 2025–2026 season.
- 20 October – The BBC announces Ryan Wang as the winner of the BBC Young Musician 2024 competition.
- 23 October – The Festival de Lanaudière announces the appointment of Clément Joubert as its new executive director.
- 25 October – The Milwaukee Symphony Orchestra announces that Ken-David Masur is to conclude his tenure as its music director at the close of the 2025–2026 season.
- 1 November – The Hong Kong Philharmonic Orchestra announces that Benedikt Fohr is to stand down as its chief executive at the close of the 2024–2025 season, in July 2025.
- 2 November –The Royal Philharmonic Society awards Yo-Yo Ma the Royal Philharmonic Society Gold Medal at the Barbican Centre, London.
- 4 November – The New York Philharmonic announces the dismissal of Matthew Muckey and Liang Wang as members of the orchestra, effective with the start of the 2025–2026 season, following a re-investigation of accusations of sexual assault and sexual harassment against them.
- 5 November – Scottish Ensemble announces the appointment of James Hardie as its chief executive, effective January 2025.
- 7 November – The Saint Paul Chamber Orchestra announces that Jon Limbacher is to stand down as its chief executive on 31 December 2025.
- 8 November – The Staatsoper Stuttgart announces the appointment of Nicholas Carter as its next GMD, effective with the 2026–2027 season.
- 13 November
  - Opera America announces that Marc A. Scorsa is to stand down as its president and chief executive officer at the end of December 2025.
  - The Pacific Symphony announces the appointment of Alexander Shelley as its next music director, effective with the 2026–2027 season, with an initial contract of five years.
- 18 November – The Utah Symphony announces the appointment of Markus Poschner as its next music director, effective with the 2027–2028 season.
- 19 November – The Berkeley Symphony announces that Joseph Young is to conclude his tenure as its music director at the close of the 2024–2025 season.
- 21 November – The Orchestre National de France announces the appointment of Philippe Jordan as its next music director, effective with the 2027–2028 season. In parallel, Cristian Măcelaru is scheduled to stand down as the orchestra's music director at the close of the 2026–2027 season.
- 22 November – The Trondheim Symphony Orchestra announces the appointment of Adam Hickox as its next chief conductor, effective with the 2025–2026 season.
- 25 November – The Savannah Philharmonic Orchestra announces that Keitaro Harada is to conclude his tenure as its music director on 30 June 2027.
- 28 November – The Leeds International Piano Competition announces that Adam Gatehouse is to stand down as its artistic director in the spring of 2025.
- 29 November – The Teatro Regio (Turin) announces the appointment of Andrea Battistoni as its next music director, effective 1 January 2025, with an initial contract of two seasons.
- 2 December
  - The New York Philharmonic announces the appointment of Matías Tarnopolsky as its next president and chief executive officer, effective 1 January 2025.
  - The Philadelphia Orchestra announces the departure of Matías Tarnopolsky as its president and chief executive officer at the close of 2024.
  - The University of Louisville announces Christian Mason as the recipient of the 2025 Grawemeyer Award for Music Composition, for his work Invisible Threads.
- 6 December – Sean Rafferty presents his final broadcast of In Tune on BBC Radio 3.
- 7 December
  - A concert for the reopening of Notre-Dame de Paris features the cathedral's four organistes titulaires, Olivier Latry, Vincent Dubois, Thierry Escaich and Thibault Fajoles, and such classical music artists as Benjamin Bernheim, Khatia Buniatishvili, Gautier Capuçon, Renaud Capuçon, Lang Lang, Daniel Lozakovich, Yo-Yo Ma, Nadine Sierra, and Pretty Yende, with the Orchestre Philharmonique de Radio France conducted by Gustavo Dudamel.
  - The newly formed Constellation Orchestra and Choir gives its first performance under the direction of Sir John Eliot Gardiner at the Elbphilharmonie, Hamburg.
- 8 December – The Goldner String Quartet gives its final performance at Verbruggen Hall, Sydney Conservatorium of Music.
- 9 December – The New Jersey Symphony announces the appointment of Terry D. Loftis as its next president and chief executive officer, effective in March 2025.
- 17 December – The Landestheater Niederbayern announces the appointment of Elisa Gogou as its next general music director (Generalmusikdirektorin), the first female conductor to be named to the post, effective with the 2026–2027 season.
- 18 December – The Spanish National Orchestra announces the appointment of Kent Nagano as its next artistic director and chief conductor, effective with the 2026–2027 season, with an initial contract of five seasons. In parallel, David Afkham is scheduled to stand down as the orchestra's artistic director and chief conductor at the close of the 2025–2026 season.
- 19 December – The Palau de les Arts Reina Sofía announces that James Gaffigan is to stand down as its music director at the close of the 2024–2025 season.
- 20 December – The Deutsche Oper am Rhein announces that Christoph Meyer is to stand down as its Generalintendant on 30 March 2025, for health reasons.
- 25 December – The Christmas Service at St Paul's Cathedral features girls as full choristers for the first time in the institution's history, with five girl choristers as part of the service.

== New works ==
The following composers' works were composed, premiered, or published this year, as noted in the citation.

=== A ===
- Katy Abbott – Liquid Thunder
- John Adams – Frenzy
- Thomas Adès – Aquifer
- Andy Akiho – Nisei: Concerto for Cello and Chamber Orchestra
- Francisco Alvarado – REW•PLAY•FFWD
- Julian Anderson
  - String Quartet No. 4
  - Nothing At All (text adapted by Paul Griffiths from Hagoromo by Zeami Motokiyo)
- Mark Andre – ...selig ist...
- Richard Ayres
  - No. 57 (K's Strange Day)
  - No. 58 (Bruckner)

=== B ===
- Joanna Bailie – night scenes i & ii
- Katherine Balch
  - musica pyralis
  - songs and interludes
  - Country Radio
- Jasmine Arielle Barnes – KINSFOLKNEM
- Mason Bates – Nomad Concerto (violin concerto)
- Carola Bauckholt – My Light Lives in the Dark;
- Jeff Beal – Body in Motion (violin concerto)
- Franck Bedrossian – Feu sur moi
- David Behrman – CW90
- David Bird – Hinterlands
- Daniel Bjarnason – Fragile Hope
- Laura Bowler – Blue
- Charlotte Bray – A Dark Doorway
- Courtney Bryan – Visual Rhythms

=== C ===
- Anna Clyne
  - ATLAS (for piano and orchestra)
  - The Gorgeous Nothings (texts by Emily Dickinson)
- Francisco Coll – Ciudad sin sueño (for piano and orchestra)
- Amy Crankshaw – November moon readings
- Chaya Czernowin
  - Poetica
  - Moths of Hunger and Awe
  - Unforeseen dusk: bones into wings

=== D ===
- Anthony Davis (music) and Quincy Troupe (text) – Broken in Parts
- Nathan James Dearden – Messages
- Bryce Dessner – Piano Concerto
- Leonid Desyatnikov – Reflections on a Folk Song
- Jonathan Dove
  - Togetherness (for string quartet)
  - Odyssey (text by Alasdair Middleton)
- Connor D’Netto – Witness

=== E ===
- Ross Edwards – Vespers for Mother Earth
- Péter Eötvös
  - Harp Concerto
  - 13 Haïkus(texts by Matsuo Bashō and Yosa Buson)

=== F ===
- Iain Farrington – Extra Time
- Delyth Field – Shoegaze Capsule
- Michael Finnissy – Was frag Ich nach der Welt
- Mary Finsterer – The Philosopher's Dream

=== G ===
- Sara Glojnarić – DING, DONG, DARLING!
- Atsuhiko Gondai
  - Strings Between Time and Eternity
  - Lachrimae, or 5 Teares (harpsichord concerto)
- Mats Larsson Gothe – Submarea
- Helen Grime (music) and Zoe Gilbert (text) – Folk

=== H ===
- Miho Hazama – What the wind brings
- Gavin Higgins – Horn Concerto
- Wilfried Hiller – Apokalypse
- York Höller – Prolog und Abgesang
- Toshio Hosokawa
  - In the Forest
  - Oreksis
- Sir Stephen Hough
  - Piano Concerto ('World of Yesterday')
  - Piano Quintet
- Dani Howard – Ascent
- Huang Ruo
  - The Grand Song
  - City of Floating Sounds
- Oswald Huynh – no last days, only more tomorrows

=== I ===
- Vijay Iyer
  - What isn't hard to see
  - Variations on a Theme by Ornette Coleman

=== J ===
- Pierre Jalbert – Equilibrium
- Jakub Jankowski – Ritornello
- Alison Yun-Fei Jiang – Illumination
- Natalie Joachim – Cocoon
- Stephen Johnson – Unquiet Sleepers
- Christian Jost
  - Lontano doloroso
  - Drei Lieder auf Gedichte von Mascha Kaléko
  - Eismeer (Sea of Ice)

=== K ===
- Daniel Kidane – Aloud (violin concerto)
- Noriko Koide – Riverside
- Mary Kouyoumdjian – ANDOUNI (Homeless)
- Lucia Kilger – mescarill

=== L ===
- Sophie Lacaze (music) and Alain Carré (libretto) – L'étoffe inépuisable du rêve
- Thomas Larcher
  - Love and the Fever (original Japanese texts by Miyazawa Kenji, English translations by Roger Pulvers)
  - Unerzählt
- Han Lash
  - Songs of Change
  - The Art of Leaving
- Dominique Le Gendre – Concerto for Orchestra
- George E. Lewis – The Reincarnation of Blind Tom
- Liza Lim – A sutured world (for cello and orchestra)
- Jimmy López Bellido (music) and Nilo Cruz (texts) – Quiet Poems

=== M ===
- Steven Mackey – Aluminum Flowers
- Sir James MacMillan
  - Concerto for Orchestra (Ghosts)
  - Love Bade me Welcome (text by George Herbert)
- Ragnhild May – Multiplayer Instrument
- Kirsten Milenko – Hyphae
- Cassandra Miller – Chanter
- Conor Mitchell – Riot Symphony
- Luke Mombrea – Black Gold
- Jasmine Morris – Ca'
- Olli Mustonen
  - Introduzione e Allegro alla Polacca (for piano trio)
  - Sadunkertoja (The Storyteller, flute concerto)

=== N ===
- Phill Niblock
  - Billana
  - BLK+LND
- Ben Nobuto – Hallelujah Sim.

=== P ===
- Electra Perivolaris – A Wave of Voices
- Stefan Pohlit – Vapur
- Enno Poppe – Streik

=== R ===
- James Ra – Te Deum
- Bernard Rands – Memo 9
- Maja Ratkje – A Whisper, or a Prayer, or a Song
- Olga Rayeva – Am Meer (On the Sea)
- Ellen Reid – Body Cosmic
- Matthew Ricketts (music) and Alain Farah (text) – Cent soleils
- Thea Rossen – Aragonite

=== S ===
- Claudia Jane Scroccaro – On the Edge
- Sheridan Seyfried – Forest and Sky
- Valentin Silvestrov – Cantata No. 12 (text by Taras Shevchenko)
- Carlos Simon – Hellfighter's Blues
- Mark Simpson – Hold Your Heart in Your Teeth (viola concerto)
- Alvin Singleton – Bed-Stuy Sonata
- Lachlan Skipworth – Flute Concerto
- Asteryth Sloane – Losing the Lark
- Gregory Spears – The Neighboring Village (text by Franz Kafka)
- Simon Steen-Andersen – grosso

=== T ===
- Outi Tarkiainen – Mosaics for "A Fragile Hope"
- Jerod Impichchaachaaha' Tate – Abokkoli' Taloowa' (Woodland Songs)
- Josh Taylor –
  - Etude 1
  - Etude 2 (Footsteps)
  - Etude 3 (Cascades)
- Simeon ten Holt – Serra-Sierra
- Augusta Read Thomas – Bebop Kaleidoscope – Homage to Duke Ellington
- Joel Thompson – To See the Sky
- Jiří Teml – Concerto for Clarinet and Orchestra

=== V ===
- Rick van Veldhuizen – Lantaarns (Lointaines)

=== W ===
- Freya Waley-Cohen – Spell Book
- Errollyn Wallen – String Quintet
- Huw Watkins – Horn Concerto
- Alyssa Weinberg – Illuminating Arches
- Dame Judith Weir – Planet
- Jörg Widmann – Horn Concerto
- Ryan Wigglesworth – Glasmelodien (after Mozart's Adagio in C, K.356)
- Roderick Williams (music) and Rommi Smith (texts) – Not Yet Here
- Peter Wittrich – Desert Dreams
- Krzysztof Wołe – Green Grass
- Christian Wolff
  - Ghost Swifts
  - What If?
  - Piece for Seven Percussionists

=== X ===
- Xi Wang – YEAR 2020 (double concerto for violin, trumpet, and orchestra)

=== Y ===
- Raymond Yiu – Violin Concerto
- Miraima Young – Daughters of Elysium

=== Z ===
- Ellen Taaffe Zwilich – Orchestral Excursions (Inspired by Gilbert Maurer's Art Work)

== New operas ==
- Lee Bradshaw and Saleh Zamaman – Zarqa Al Yamama
- Marc-André Dalbavie and Guillaume Métayer – Melancholie des Widerstands
- Elizabeth Gartman and Melisa Tien – Forever
- Detlev Glanert and Hans-Ulrich Treichel – Die Jüdin von Toledo
- Felix Jarrar and Bea Goodwin – Hindsight
- Laura Jobin-Acosta and José Alba Rodríguez – A Way Forward
- Laura Kaminsky and David Cote – Lucidity
- Gordon Kampe and Carina Sophie Eberle – Sasja und das Reich jenseits des Meeres
- Mikael Karlsson and Royce Vavrek – Fanny and Alexander
- Bernhard Lang and Frank Witzel – Dora
- Ella Milch-Sheriff and Ido Ricklin – Alma
- Hèctor Parra and Fiston Mwanza Mujila – Justice
- Joy Redmond and Sam Norman – Hairpiece
- Gregory Spears and Tracy K. Smith – The Righteous
- Jerod Impichchaachaaha' Tate – Loksi' Shaali' (the first opera composed with a Chicksaw language libretto)
- Ludiger Vollmer (music) and Kurt Schwitters (original libretto, revised by Ulrike Schumann) – Zusammenstoß (Collision)
- Ludiger Vollmer (music), Feridun Zaimoglu and Günter Senkel (librettists) – Buddenbrooks

== New albums ==
- John Adams and Peter Sellars – Girls of the Golden West (first recording)
- John Luther Adams – An Atlas of Deep Time (first recording)
- Franco Alfano – Complete Songs
- Timo Andres – The Blind Banister
- Sir George Benjamin and Martin Crimp – Picture a day like this (first recording)
- Havergal Brian – The Cenci (first recording)
- Thomas de Hartmann – Cello Concerto, Violin Concerto
- Elgar – The Dream of Gerontius (first recording on period instruments)
- Imogen Holst – 'Discovering Imogen': Overture Persephone, Suite in F – Allegro assai, Suite for Strings, Variations on "Loth to Depart", 'What Man is He?', Festival Anthem (orchestrated by Colin Matthews), On Westhall Hill
- Dorothy Howell – 'Orchestral Works' ('Humoresque, The Rock, Three Divertissements, Lamia, Koong Shee)
- Dani Howard – 'Orchestral Works' (Argentum, Trombone Concerto, Ellipsis, Coalescence, Arches)
- Elisabeth Lutyens – 'Piano Works, Volume 3'
- Kelly Moran – Moves in the Field
- Paul Moravec and Mark Campbell – The Shining (first recording)
- Anthony Payne – Visions and Journeys, Half-Heard in the Stillness, The Seeds Long Hidden (first commercial issues)
- Adam Pounds – Symphony No. 3 (first recording; coupled with music of Maurice Ravel and Lennox Berkeley)
- Schubert – Piano Sonata No. 18, D. 894 / Moments musicaux, D. 780 / Fantasy in F for Piano-Four Hands, D. 940 (Maurizio Pollini, Daniele Pollini; the final recording of Maurizio Pollini)
- Giacinto Scelsi – String Quartets (complete), String Trio
- Rita Strohl – Volume 3, Orchestral Works (premiere recordings)
- Grace Williams – 'Orchestral Works' (Four Illustrations for the Legend of Rhiannon, Castell Caernarfon: Prelude – Processional, Ballads, Sea Sketches)
- Arash Yazdani – Propagation of Uncertainty (orchestral works)
- John Zorn – Her Melodious Lay

== Deaths ==
- 1 January – Oldřich Semerák, Czech composer, trombonist and pedagogue, 91
- 6 January – Deborah Reeder, American cellist, 83
- 7 January – William McColl, American clarinetist, 90
- 8 January
  - Tuomo Haapanen, Finnish violinist, pedagogue, and conductor, 99
  - Karel Janovický, Czech composer, pianist, radio producer, translator and administrator, 93
  - Phill Niblock, American avant-garde composer, filmmaker, and videographer, 90
- 10 January – Tamara Milashkina, Russian soprano, 89
- 12 January
  - David Lumsdaine, Australian composer resident in the UK, 92
  - Sidney Weiss, American violinist, 95
- 13 January
  - Bruno Ducol, French composer, pianist and pedagogue, 74
  - Romuald Twardowski, Polish composer, pianist, organist and pedagogue, 93
- 16 January – Peter Schickele, American composer, music educator and parodist, 88
- 17 January – Gerd Uecker, German opera administrator, 77
- 18 January – Ivan Moody, British composer, musicologist and critic, 59
- 19 January – Ewa Podles, Polish contralto, 71
- 23 January – Romana Vaccaro, Czech soprano resident in Germany, 67
- 28 January – Albert Mayr, Italian composer, musicologist and pedagogue, 76
- 2 February – Wilhelmenia Fernandez, American soprano and pedagogue, 75
- 3 February – Hannele Angervo-Segerstam, Finnish orchestra violinist and concertmaster (leader), 80
- 6 February
  - Seiji Ozawa, Japanese conductor, 88
  - Zaven Melikian, Yugoslavia-born American opera orchestra violinist, 94
- 12 February
  - Cliff Colnot, American conductor, 76
  - Rudolf Jansen, Dutch pianist, 84
  - Stewart Robertson, Scottish conductor, 75
- 14 February – Patrick Ireland, British violist and founding violist of the Allegri String Quartet, 100
- 17 February
  - Edmond Baert, Belgian cellist, 90
  - Geoffrey Michaels, Australia-born violinist, violist and pedagogue resident in the US, 79
  - Sally Thomas, American violinist and pedagogue, 92
- 19 February – Dennis Rooney, American classical music radio presenter and producer, 82
- 25 February – Roger E. Myers, Australia-born violist resident in the US, 57
- 27 February – Roger Zabinski, American bow maker, 73
- 28 February – Eugen Indijc, Yugoslavia-born French-American pianist, 76
- 3 March – George E. Allen Sr., American composer and pedagogue, 87
- 5 March – Amnon Weinstein, Israeli luthier and founder of the Violins of Hope collection, 84
- 13 March – Aribert Reimann, German composer, 88
- 14 March – Byron Janis, American pianist, 95
- 23 March
  - Maurizio Pollini, Italian pianist and conductor, 82
  - Igor Ozim, Slovenia violinist and pedagogue, 92
- 24 March – Péter Eötvös, Hungarian composer and conductor, 80
- 27 March – Paul Philips, American orchestral violinist, 77
- 7 April – Michael Boder, German conductor, 65
- 18 April – Joséphine Markovits, French arts administrator, 77
- 20 April – Sir Andrew Davis, British conductor, 80
- 27 April – Serge Gaymard, French opera house administrator, 68
- 4 May – Jón Thorsteinsson, Icelandic tenor, 73
- 10 May – Jiří Žigmund, Czech violist and pedagogue, 58
- 25 May
  - Hugues Gall, French opera house administrator, 84
  - Reinhold Kubik, Austrian musicologist, pianist and conductor, 82
- 7 June – Ernstalbrecht Stiebler, German composer, 90
- 11 June
  - Éric Tappy, Swiss tenor, 91
  - Charles Geyer, American orchestral trumpet player, 79
  - Kevork Mardirossian, Bulgarian violinist and academic resident in the US, 70
- 13 June – Paul Sperry, American tenor, 90
- 16 June – Jodie Devos, Belgian soprano, 35
- 19 June – James Loughran, Scottish conductor, 92
- 20 June – Maynard Goldman, American orchestral violinist, 88
- 23 June
  - David Tunley, Australian musicologist and composer, 94
  - Albert Payson, American orchestral percussionist, 90
- 27 June – Alexander Knaifel, Russian composer, 80
- 28 June – Lando Bartolini, Italian tenor, 87
- 5 July – Liana Isakadze, Georgian violinist, 77
- 6 July – Teodor Zgureanu, Moldovan choral conductor and composer, 85
- 11 July – Stanislas Deriemaeker, Belgian organist, composer and pedagogue, 92
- 13 July – Ruth Hesse, German mezzo-soprano, 87
- 14 July – Sarah Gibson, American composer, 38
- 16 July
  - April Cantelo, British soprano, 96
  - Elena Mauti Nunziata, Italian soprano, 92
- 17 July – Alcides Lanza, Argentina-born composer resident in Canada, 95
- 20 July – Gladys de Moctezuma, Salvadoran soprano, pedagogue, and arts administrator, 96
- 21 July – Eugene Sârbu, Romanian violinist, 73
- 22 July – Jerzy Artysz, Polish baritone and teacher, 73
- 23 July – Anna Nshanyan, Egyptian soprano, 92
- 25 July – Benjamin Luxon, British baritone, 87
- 27 July – Wolfgang Rihm, German composer, 72
- 1 August – Jürgen Ahrend, German organ builder, 94
- 3 August – Antonio Meneses, Brazilian cellist, 66
- 4 August – Miguel Ángel Gómez Martínez, Spanish conductor and composer, 74
- 12 August – Harold Meltzer, American composer, 58
- 19 August – R. Peter Munves, American classical record executive, 97
- 20 August – Christopher Pollard, British music magazine editor, 67
- 26 August – Alexander Goehr, British composer, 92
- 27 August – Howard Crook, American tenor, 77
- 6 September – Lucine Amara, American soprano, 99
- 7 September – Anthony Checchia, American classical music administrator, 94
- 20 September – Richard Dyer, American classical music critic, 82
- 29 September – Rohan de Saram, UK-born Sri Lankan cellist, 85
- 6 October – Dominic Cossa, American baritone, 89
- 7 October – Amaury du Closel, French composer and conductor, 68
- 8 October – Jorge Arriagada, Chile-born composer resident in France, 81
- 9 October – Leif Segerstam, Finnish conductor and composer, 80
- 10 October
  - Mary Mogil, British choral conductor, singer, pedagogue, and voice trainer, 83
  - Adam Abeshouse, American classical recording producer, 63
- 11 October – John Barstow, British pianist and pedagogue, 87
- 14 October – Barbara J. Owen, American organist and organ scholar, 91
- 15 October – Garbis Aprikian, Armenian choral conductor and composer, 98
- 20 October – Janusz Olejniczak, Polish pianist, 72
- 31 October – Sarah Leonard, British soprano, 71
- 10 November – Walfrid Kujala, American orchestral flautist, 99
- 12 November – Barrie Gavin, British film and television director, 89
- 16 November – Jay David Saks, American audio and recording engineer and producer affiliated with the Metropolitan Opera, 79
- 18 November
  - Joane Bennett, American-born flautist and arts administrator resident in France, 90
  - György Pauk, Hungarian violinist resident in the UK, 88
- 21 November – Laura Samuel, orchestra leader (BBC Scottish Symphony Orchestra) and founding member of the Belcea Quartet, 48
- 29 November – Marijke Ferguson, Dutch recorder player, radio presenter pedagogue, and founder of Studio Laren, 97
- 2 December – Marlos Nobre, Brazilian composer, conductor, and pianist, 85
- 3 December – Huang Zhun, Chinese composer, 98
- 9 December
  - Jack Behrens, Canadian composer, conductor, pedagogue, and writer, 89
  - Thomas Hertel, German composer, 73
- 11 December – Michio Mamiya, Japanese composer, translator, and writer, 95
- 12 December – Jeanne Bamberger, American music education researcher, pedagogue, pianist, 100
- 17 December
  - Patricia Johnson, British mezzo-soprano, 95
  - Marcel Marnat, French journalist, musicologist, and radio producer, 91
- 18 December – Sigrid Kehl, German mezzo-soprano and soprano, and pedagogue, 95
- 21 December – Elsbeth Gerritsen, Dutch mezzo-soprano, 53
- 23 December – Gerardo Guevara, Ecuadorian composer, conductor, pianist, pedagogue, and writer, 94
- 25 December – Chaim Taub, Israeli violinist and founding member of the Tel Aviv String Quartet, 99
- 31 December – Tom Johnson, American composer and music critic, 85

== Major awards ==
- 2024 Pulitzer Prize in Music: Tyshawn Sorey – Adagio (for Wadada Leo Smith)

=== 2024 Musical America Award Winners ===
- Artist of the Year: Lise Davidsen
- Composer of the Year: Kevin Puts
- Conductor of the Year: Sir Antonio Pappano
- Instrumentalist of the Year: Anthony McGill
- Ensemble of the Year: The Crossing

=== 2024 Grammy Awards ===
- Best Chamber Music/Small Ensemble Performance: Rough Magic (works by Eve Beglarian, William Brittelle, Caroline Shaw, and Peter S. Shin); Roomful of Teeth (New Amsterdam)
- Best Choral Performance: Kaija Saariaho – Reconnaissance; Uusinta Ensemble; Helsinki Chamber Choir; Nils Schweckendiek, conductor (BIS)
- Best Classical Compendium: Jeff Scott – Passion for Bach and Coltrane; Alex Brown, Harlem Quartet, Imani Winds, Edward Perez, Neal Smith, A. B. Spellman, musicians; Silas Brown and Mark Dover, producers (Imani Winds Media)
- Best Classical Instrumental Solo: The American Project (music of Teddy Abrams and Michael Tilson Thomas); Yuja Wang, piano; Louisville Orchestra; Teddy Abrams, conductor (Deutsche Grammophon)
- Best Classical Solo Vocal Album: Walking in the Dark – Julia Bullock, vocalist; Christian Reif, pianist and conductor; Philharmonia Orchestra (Nonesuch)
- Best Contemporary Classical Composition: Jessie Montgomery – Rounds (for piano and string orchestra); Awadagin Pratt, piano; A Far Cry (New Amsterdam)
- Best Opera Recording: Terence Blanchard and Michael Cristofer – Champion; Ryan Speedo Green, Latonia Moore, Eric Owens, Paul Groves, Eric Greene, Stephanie Blythe (singers); The Metropolitan Opera Orchestra; The Metropolitan Opera Chorus; Yannick Nézet-Séguin, conductor; David Frost, producer (Metropolitan Opera)
- Best Engineered Album, Classical: Contemporary American Composers (music of Jessie Montgomery, Max Raimi, and Philip Glass); Chicago Symphony Orchestra; Riccardo Muti, conductor; David Frost and Charlie Post, engineers; Silas Brown, mastering engineer (CSO Resound)
- Best Orchestral Performance: Thomas Adès – Dante; Los Angeles Philharmonic, Los Angeles Master Chorale; Gustavo Dudamel, conductor (Nonesuch)
- Producer of the Year, Classical: Elaine Martone

=== 2024 Royal Philharmonic Society Awards ===
- Chamber-Scale Composition: Laurence Osborn – TOMB!
- Conductor: François-Xavier Roth
- Ensemble: BBC Singers
- Gamechanger: Sara Lee and the Irene Taylor Trust
- Impact: Call of the Mountains – Clare Johnston and Drake Music Scotland
- Inspiration: Derwent Brass
- Instrumentalist: Jasdeep Singh Degun – sitar
- Large-Scale Composition: Kaija Saariaho – Innocence
- Opera and Music Theatre: Chornobyldorf – Huddersfield Contemporary Music Festival
- Series and Events: Manchester Classical
- Singer: Nicky Spence
- Storytelling: Quartet – Leah Broad
- Young Artist: Lotte Betts-Dean

=== 2024 Gramophone Classical Music Awards ===
  - Chamber: Robert Schumann – Piano Quartet and Piano Quintet; Isabelle Faust, Anne-Katharina Schreiber, Antoine Tamestit, Jean-Guihen Queyras, Alexander Melnikov (harmonia mundi)
  - Choral: Elgar – The Dream of Gerontius; Nicky Spence, Anna Stéphany, Andrew Foster-Williams; Polish National Youth Choir, Gabrieli, Paul McCreesh (Signum)
  - Concept Album: 'Letter(s) to Erik Satie’; Helen Charlston and Toby Carr (Delphian)
  - Concerto: Britten – Violin Concerto, Chamber Works; Isabelle Faust, Alexander Melnikov, Boris Faust; Bavarian Radio Symphony Orchestra, Jakub Hrůša (harmonia mundi)
  - Contemporary: Kaija Saariaho – Maan Varjot, Chateau de l'Ame, True Fire, Offrande; Olivier Latry, Orchestre Philharmonique de Radio France; Hannu Lintu, Ernest Martínez Izquierdo (conductors) (Radio France)
  - Early Music: Jacob Obrecht – Missa Maria zart; Cappella Pratensis, Stratton Bull (Challenge Classics)
  - Instrumental: Eugène Ysaÿe – Six Sonatas for Violin Solo, op. 27; Hilary Hahn (Deutsche Grammophon)
  - Opera: Leoš Janáček – Káťa Kabanová; Corinne Winters, Evelyn Herlitzius, David Butt Philip, Jaroslav Březina, Jarmila Balážová, Benjamin Hulett, Jens Larsen; Vienna Philharmonic Orchestra; Chorus of the Vienna State Opera; Jakub Hrůša (conductor); Barrie Kosky (stage director) (Unitel Editions)
  - Orchestral: Ralph Vaughan Williams – Job: A Masque for Dancing / Old King Cole / The Running Set; Royal Liverpool Philharmonic Orchestra, Andrew Manze (Onyx Classics)
  - Piano: Chopin – Études; Yunchan Lim (Decca Classics)
  - Song: Schubert – Die schöne Müllerin; Konstantin Krimmel and Daniel Heide (Alpha)
  - Voice and Ensemble: 'The Great Puccini'; Jonathan Teitleman, Federica Lombardi, Marina Monzó, Vida Miknevičiūtė, Rihab Chaieb, Theodore Platt, Önay Köse; PKF Prague Philharmonia, Carlo Rizzi (Deutsche Grammophon)
  - Recording of the Year: Eugène Ysaÿe – Six Sonatas for Violin Solo, op. 27; Hilary Hahn (Deutsche Grammophon)
  - Lifetime Achievement: Michael Tilson Thomas
  - Label of the Year: Opera Rara
  - Young Artist of the Year: Yuncham Lim
  - Artist of the Year: Carolyn Sampson
  - Orchestra of the Year: Czech Philharmonic
