= Carlos Damas =

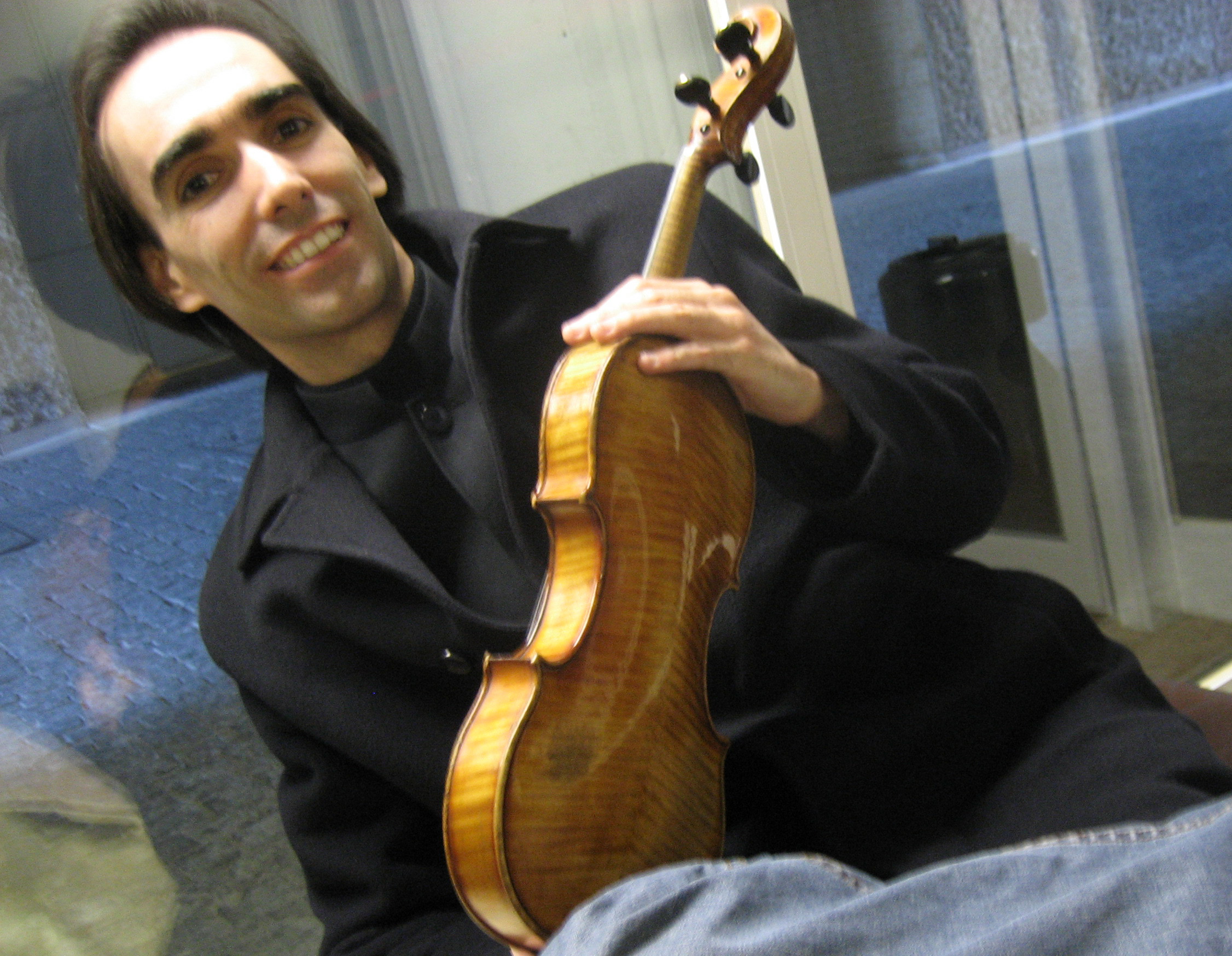

Background information
- Born: 8 April 1973 (age 53); Coimbra, Portugal
- Genres: Classical
- Occupations: violinist and teacher
- Website: https://www.carlosdamas.com

Carlos Damas (born 1973) is a Portuguese classical violinist and recording artist for Dux Records, Brilliant Classics, Et'cetera Records and Naxos. He is particularly known for his Fritz Kreisler interpretations and recordings of works by the Portuguese composers António Fragoso, Luís de Freitas Branco, Fernando Lopes-Graça and Sérgio Azevedo. Carlos Damas is widely regarded for his international career encompassing the masterpieces to contemporary works, attested by an international discography. He has often been compared by international critics to such masters as Thomas Zehetmair, Gidon Kremer and Henryk Szeryng.

== Life and career ==
Carlos Damas was born in Coimbra on April 8. He began his musical education at the age of three at the Coimbra Conservatory. At six, he moved with his family to Lisbon, where he continued his violin studies under Vasco Broco, Leonor Prado, and Alexandra Mendes.

At the age of 15, Damas made his solo debut performing with the Portuguese Radio Symphony Orchestra, conducted by Joaquim da Silva Pereira. He later pursued advanced studies at the Paris Conservatory with Jacqueline Lefèvre, Pierre Doukan and Ivry Gitlis, and received mentorship from violinist Yehudi Menuhin during his time in Paris.

In 1993, Damas premiered the Violin Concerto by Luís de Freitas Branco in Paris. Portuguese composer Sérgio Azevedo composed and dedicated the piece Reflections on a Portuguese Lullaby for solo violin and string orchestra specifically to Damas.

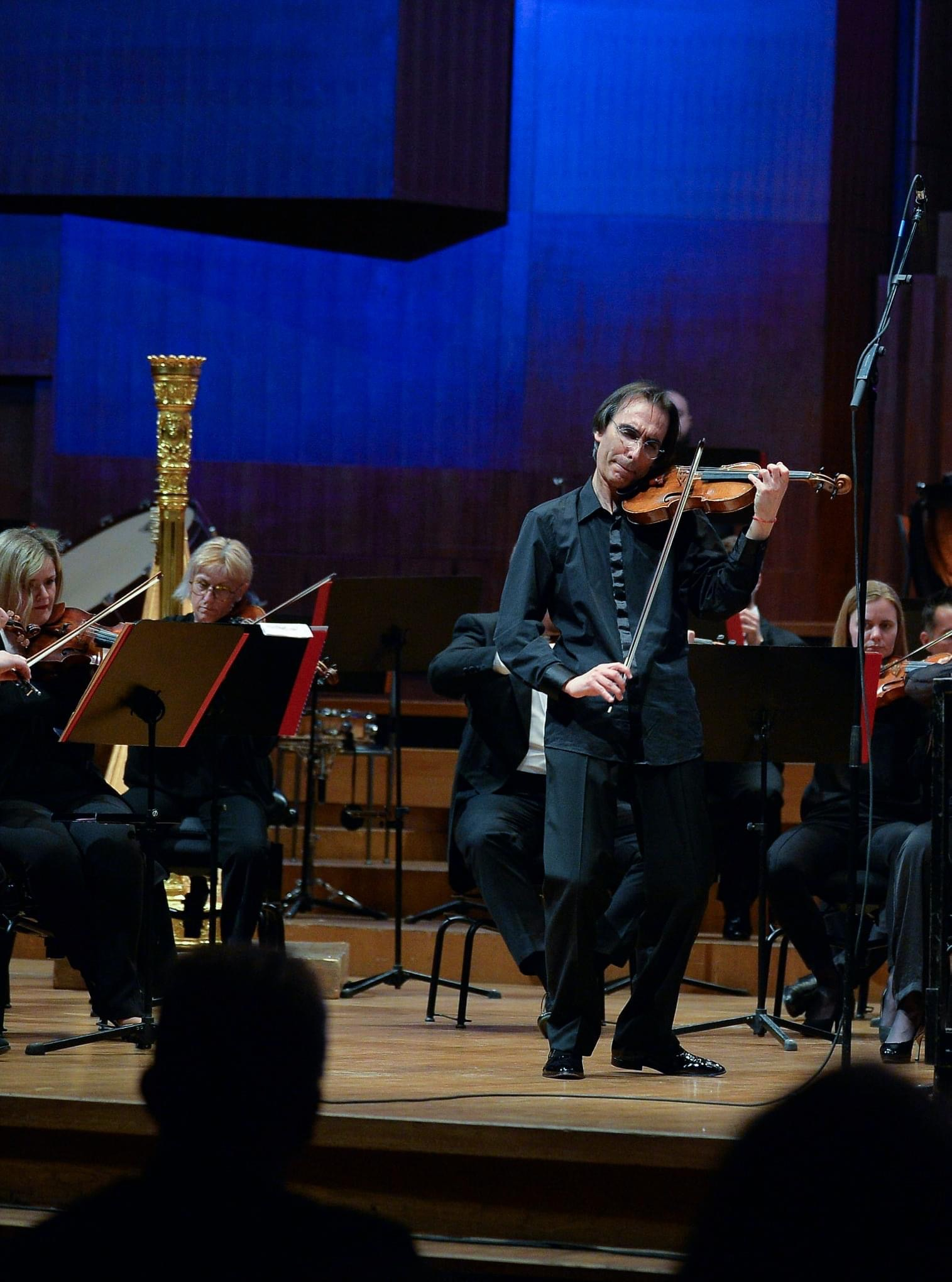
Carlos Damas in concert

Damas has appeared as a soloist with several orchestras, including the Zagreb Philharmonic Orchestra, Prague Philharmonic Orchestra, Camerata de St. Severin, Camerata da Madeira, Winnipeg Symphony Orchestra, Guangzhou Symphony Orchestra, St. Luke's Orchestra, and the Mission Chamber Orchestra of San José. Since 1997, he has performed regularly in Macao with the Macao Chamber Orchestra. He has also taken part in concerts organized by the Melody for Dialogue Among Civilizations Association in partnership with UNESCO, including a 2007 performance of Bach’s Double Violin Concerto at Lincoln Center in New York City.

He has performed in major concert venues such as Salle Gaveau and Salle Cortot (Paris), the Dom Pedro V Theatre (Macao), UNESCO Grand Auditorium (Paris), Calouste Gulbenkian Foundation, São Luiz Theater, Belém Cultural Center, Lee Hysan Concert Hall (Hong Kong), Ville Louvigny (home of the Orchestre Philharmonique du Luxembourg), the Shanghai Oriental Art Center, and the Lisinski Concert Hall in Zagreb.

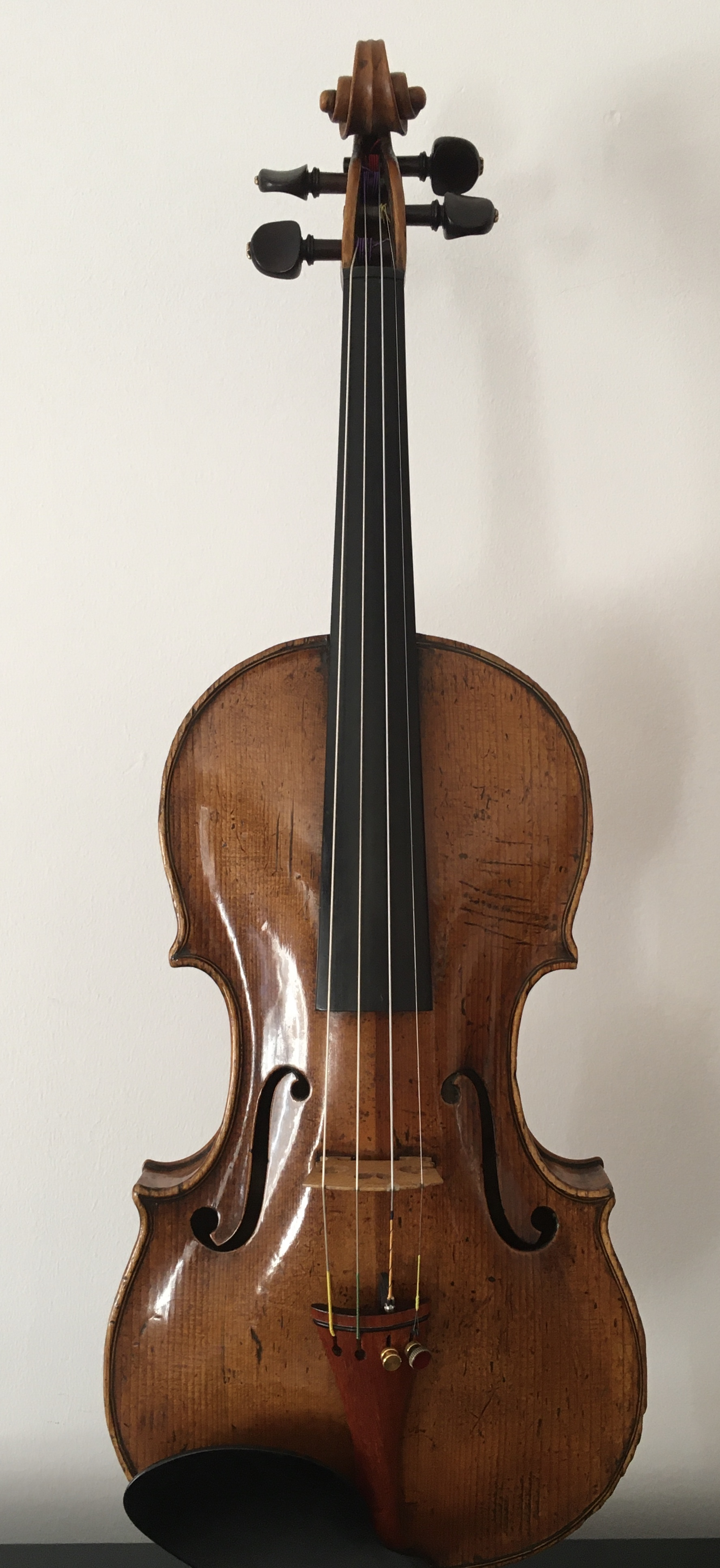
Giovanni Battista Gabrielli - 1753

Carlos Damas holds a PhD in Music Education and Psychology and serves as a violin professor at the University of Évora. He performs on a Giovanni Battista Gabrielli violin, the "ex-Isham", dated circa 1767.

== Recordings ==
Carlos Damas made the first world recordings of several Portuguese composers music, recorded for the labels Dux, Brilliant Classics, and Naxos:

- Carlos Damas, solo violin - Paganiniana/Astúrias/Lullaby for Amara (Vinil, Master Classics, August 2025)
- L. V. Beethoven - Complete Violin Sonatas Vol. 3 (Etcetera, August 2025)
- L. V. Beethoven - Complete Violin Sonatas Vol. 2 (Etcetera September 2023)
- Paganini, Wieniavsky, Sarasate, etc. - Aprés un Rêve (Etcetera July 2021)
- L. V. Beethoven - Complete Violin Sonatas Vol. 1 (Etcetera September 2020)
- Jean Sibelius - Works for Violin and Piano (Etcetera September 2016)
- Frederico de Freitas - Complete Violin Works (Brilliant Classics, 2015)
- Armando José Fernandes (Brilliant Classics, 2014)
- António Fragoso (Brilliant Classics, 2011)
- Luís de Freitas Branco (Naxos, 2010)
- Fritz Kreisler (DUX Records 2009)
- Carlos Damas - Modern Solo Violin Music, including the first recordings of Lopes-Graça's Espçonsais and Azevedo's Sonatina No. 1 (DUX Records 2007)
- Beethoven, Sonatas for violin and piano nº4 & nº5" (MasterClassics/Universal 2004)
- Carlos Damas - Violino Solo (Numérica 2000)
- Diálogos do Silêncio (Tradisom/Sony 1997)
- Felix Mendelssohn Bartholdy (Numérica 1995)
