= Teatro Nacional de São Carlos =

Building in Lisbon, Portugal

Coordinates: 38°42′34″N 9°8′30″W

National Theater of São Carlos
- Teatro Nacional de São Carlos
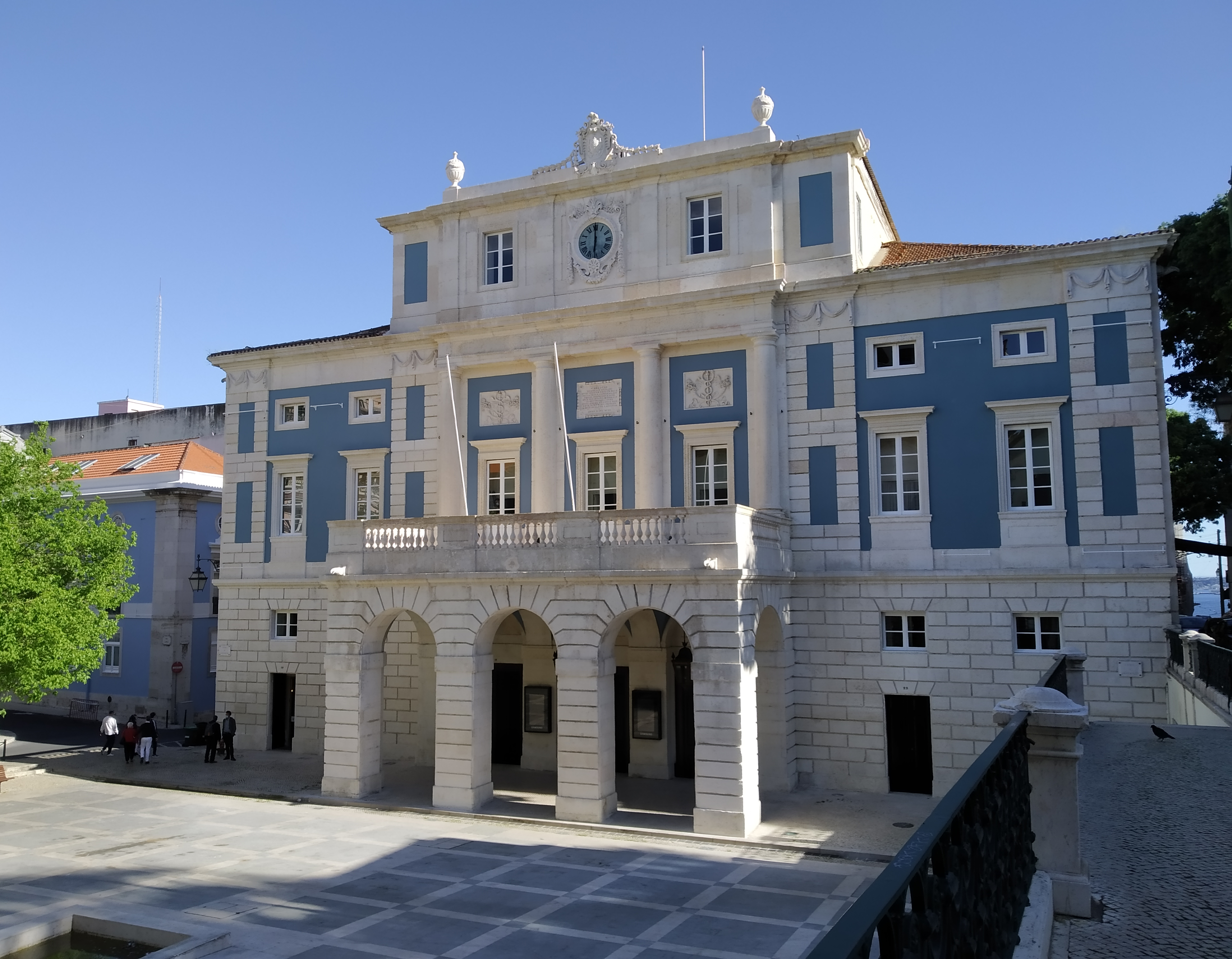

General information
- Location: Lisbon, Portugal
- Opened: 30 June 1793

Website
- http://tnsc.pt/

The Teatro Nacional de São Carlos (Portuguese pronunciation: [tiˈatɾu nɐsiuˈnal dɨ sɐ̃w ˈkaɾluʃ]) (National Theatre of Saint Charles) is an opera house in Lisbon, Portugal. It was opened on June 30, 1793 by Queen Maria I as a replacement for the Tejo Opera House, which was destroyed in the 1755 Lisbon earthquake. The theatre is located in the historical center of Lisbon, in the Chiado district.

The house has a seating capacity of 844 seats.

== History ==
In 1792, a group of Lisbon businessmen decided to finance the construction of a new Opera House in the city. The theatre was built in only six months following a design by Portuguese architect José da Costa e Silva, with neoclassical and rococo elements. The general project is clearly inspired by great Italian theatres like the San Carlo of Naples (interior) and La Scala in Milan (interior and façade). In the early 19th century, when the Portuguese Royal Court had to flee to the Portuguese colony of Brazil to escape the invading Napoleonic troops, a theatre modelled on the São Carlos was built in Rio de Janeiro.

The theatre was erected in honor of Princess Charlotte of Spain who had been married in 1785 at the age of 10 to the future King, Prince John and resided with him from 1790 once she was of childbearing age: Carlos (Portuguese form of Charles) is the masculine form of Charlotte. A Latin commemorative inscription dedicates the theatre to the princess.

The first opera presented here, in 1793, was La Ballerina Amante, by Domenico Cimarosa. The most famous Portuguese composer of the time, Marcos Portugal, became musical director of the São Carlos in 1800 after returning from Italy, and many of his operas were staged here.

Between 1828 and 1834, the São Carlos was closed during the Portuguese Civil War, fought between kings Miguel I and Pedro IV. In 1850, the lighting of the interior was changed to gas illumination, the latest technology available. Shortly afterwards, the Portuguese state bought the theatre from private shareholders. After a few failed attempts, electrical illumination was installed in 1887. From 1935 to 1940, the theatre was closed for repairs.

A resident opera company was established in 1993, including the soprano, Elizette Bayan. The Orquestra Sinfónica Portuguesa was created as the Teatro's affiliate orchestra, with Álvaro Cassuto as the orchestra's first principal conductor. Subsequent principal conductors of the Orquestra Sinfónica Portuguesa have included José Ramón Encinar (1999–2001), Zoltán Peskó (2001–2004) and Julia Jones (2008–2011). Since January 2014, the orchestra's principal conductor is Joana Carneiro.

The theatre building was classified as Property of Public Interest in 1928 and has been reclassified as a National Monument since 1996.

== Architecture ==
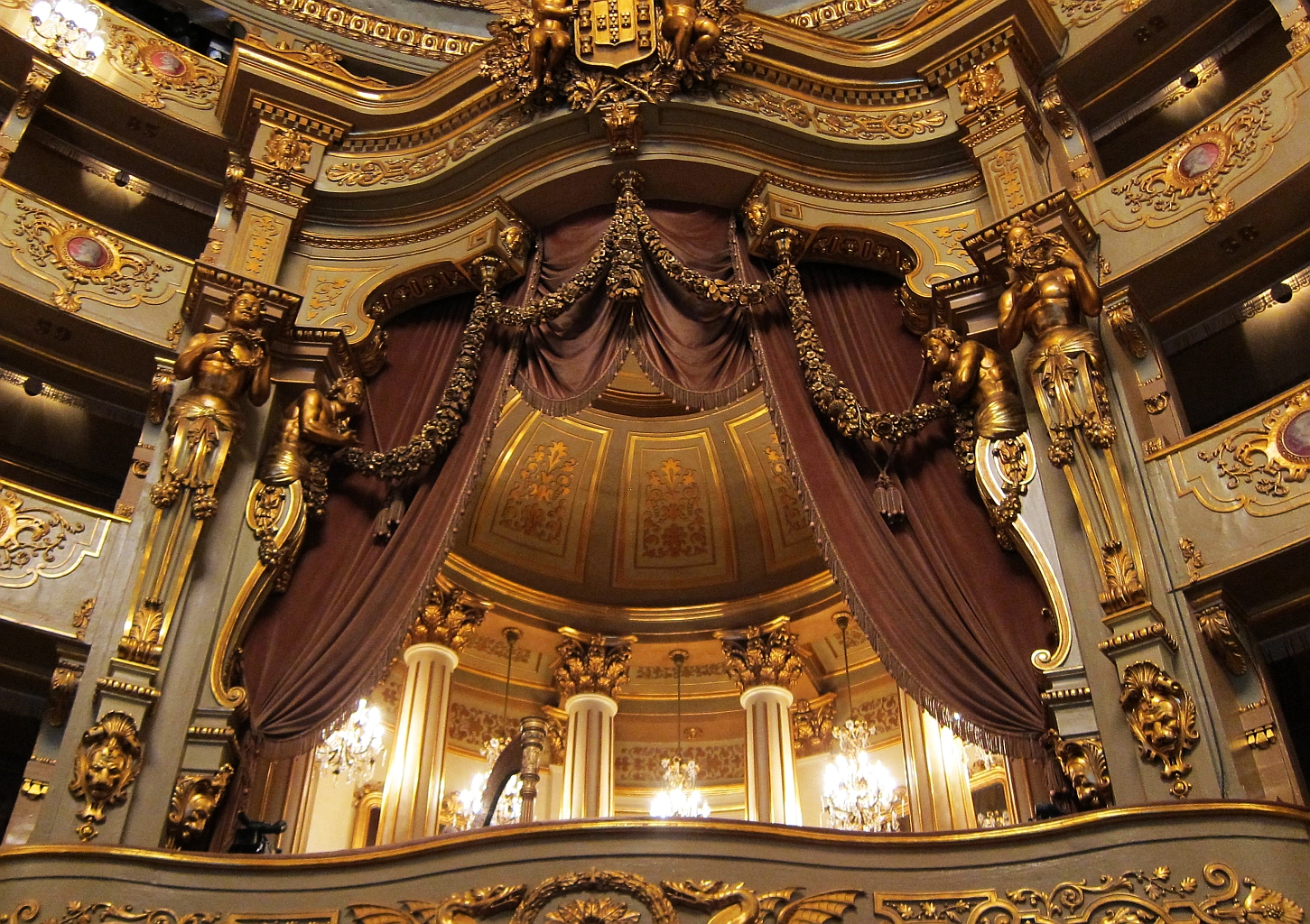
Interior of the theatre.

Longitudinal and composite building with articulated parts has a sober facade. The frontispiece is divided into 3 parts: 2 floors on mezzanine and a third floor on the central body. This central body is torn by a portico (entrance hall), and has a loggia at the ground level composed of 3 frontal arches and a lateral, in perfect round. The loggia is crowned by a perfect terrace of balustrade in stonework. Here, the windows are framed by parastase, that supports a highlighted cornice. They also have a crown composed of panels with inscription and two high reliefs. At the level of the third floor, this same central body presents a clock surrounded by garlands and two windows, all of which is surmounted by two pinnacles and the Portuguese coats-of-arms.

At the level of the first floor, the two side bodies have two straight-polished doors crowned by low windows. Although with the same two windows, at the second floor level they feature balustrade in stonework, protruding cornice and a small window in the mezzanine area.

The main room (performance hall) is elliptic, has five tiers of boxes and seats 1148 people. The royal box was decorated by the Italian Giovanni Appianni. The ceiling was painted by Manuel da Costa and the stage by Cirilo Wolkmar Machado.

== See also ==
- List of theatres and auditoriums in Lisbon
