= Álvaro Cassuto =

Portuguese composer and conductor (1938–2026)

- Cassuto c. 2000
- Born: Álvaro Leon Cassuto; 17 November 1938; Porto, Portugal
- Died: 6 April 2026 (aged 87); Cascais, Portugal
- Education: University of Lisbon; Vienna Conservatory
- Occupations: Composer; Conductor
- Awards: Order of Saint James of the Sword

Álvaro Leon Cassuto (European Portuguese pronunciation: [ˈaɫvɐɾu kɐˈsutu]; 17 November 1938 – 6 April 2026) was a Portuguese composer and conductor, regarded as one of Portugal's leading conductors. He was music director of the Portuguese Radio Symphony from 1975 to 1987, and of American orchestras. He founded and conducted the Nova Filarmonia Portuguesa and the Algarve Orchestra. He internationally promoted music by Portuguese composers, recording for example the complete symphonies of Joly Braga Santos.

== Life and career ==
Álvaro Leon Cassuto was born on 17 November 1938 in Porto, the son of German-Jewish parents from Hamburg (Cassuto stated that his father, grandfather and great-grandfather lived in Hamburg) and his mother was German-born. He also had Italian ancestry through his paternal side. His parents fled from Germany to Portugal during the Nazi regime, and he soon began learning violin, piano, and composition. He studied in Lisbon and Berlin, with Artur Santos and Fernando Lopes-Graça. He earned a law degree from the University of Lisbon in 1964, thinking of a diplomatic career. His interest in music was greater, and he achieved a degree in conducting one year later from the Vienna Conservatory, after studies with Pedro de Freitas Branco who was known for conducting Ravel's music. Cassuto studied with Herbert von Karajan, whom he admired.

Cassuto made his debut as a conductor in 1961 with the Porto Orchestra. He worked for the Gulbenkian Orchestra, as assistant conductor from 1965 to 1968 and as deputy musical director from 1970 to 1975. In 1968 Leopold Stokowski invited him to become assistant conductor of the American Symphony Orchestra, and he first conducted at Avery Fisher Hall in New York City. He lived in the United States for 18 years, conducting the Philadelphia Orchestra, the Oklahoma City Philharmonic, and the San Antonio Symphony, among others. He taught at the Juilliard School in New York City in 1981 and 1982.

=== Composition ===
With his Sinfonias breves (1959–60), he became the first Portuguese composer to adopt integral serialism techniques. He attended the Darmstädter Ferienkurse in 1960 and 1961 where he came into contact with Karlheinz Stockhausen, György Ligeti and Olivier Messiaen. As a composer, he received commissions from musical institutions in Portugal and the United States. His output is mainly orchestral. In the 1970s, he explored postmodern neo-tonal techniques. In later years his conducting schedule tended to take precedence over composing.

=== Music director ===
Cassuto was music director of the Portuguese Radio Symphony from 1975 to 1987. He was also director of the University of California Symphony Orchestra from 1974 to 1979, of the Rhode Island Philharmonic Orchestra from 1979 to 1985, and of the National Orchestra of New York, running an annual concert series at Carnegie Hall. After two national Portuguese orchestras were dissolved, he founded and conducted three orchestras, the New Portuguese Philharmonia in 1988, directing it until 1993, then the Orquestra Sinfónica Portuguesa, and in 2002 the Algarve Orchestra. Cassuto was credited with "patience, persistence, and skill as an orchestra builder". He led the Lisbon Metropolitan Orchestra from 2004 to 2008.

Abroad, he was principal conductor and artistic director of the Raanana Symphony Orchestra in Israel from 2000 to 2002. He conducted the Bari Orchestra in Italy from 2010 to 2013. He conducted as a guest the London Philharmonic Orchestra, the Royal Philharmonic Orchestra, the BBC Philharmonic, the Philadelphia, and the Orchestre de la Suisse Romande.

=== Recordings ===
Cassuto recorded many successful CDs for the labels Strauss and Portugalsom, and for the Marco Polo line of Naxos a series of recordings of works by Portuguese composers with the Bournemouth Symphony Orchestra, the City of London Sinfonia and the Northern Sinfonia.

Cassuto promoted the music of Portuguese composers internationally; he recorded symphonies by João Domingos Bomtempo with the Algarve Orchestra in 2002. He recorded the complete symphonies by Joly Braga Santos, who was his friend. A reviewer from Gramophone, listening to his Divertimentos and Cello Concerto, noted that Cassuto "drew some fine playing" from the Algarve Orchestra. A reviewer of symphonies No. 1 and 5 played by the Portuguese Symphony Orchestra, wrote in 1998 of "deeply committed performances" and "fantastic recorded sound, especially in the Fifth’s massive, cataclysmic finale". From 2008 to 2010 he recorded orchestral works by Luís de Freitas Branco with the National Symphony Orchestra of Ireland in four volumes. With the Royal Scottish National Orchestra, he recorded orchestral works by Fernando Lopes-Graça in 2012 and by Frederico de Freitas in 2013. He recorded works by José Vianna da Motta with the Royal Liverpool Philharmonic in 2015.

=== Death ===
Cassuto died at his home in Cascais, on 6 April 2026, at the age of 87.

== Awards ==
Cassuto was the recipient of numerous awards, including the 1969 Koussevitzky Memorial Prize in Tanglewood. He received the Press Award in Portugal in 1970. A 2004 recording of Braga Santos' Fourth Symphony earned him a MIDEM Classical Award. In 2009, the President of Portugal awarded him the degree of Grand Officer of the Military Order of Saint James of the Sword to celebrate the 50th anniversary of his career. He received a lifetime award from the Sociedade Portuguesa de Autores in 2022.

== Compositions ==
Cassuto's works include:

- Sonatina (1959)
- Sinfonia breve no. 1 (1959)
- Overture for Strings
- Sinfonia breve no. 2 (1960)
- In memoriam Pedro de Freitas Branco (1963)
- Cro(mono)fonia (1967)
- Canticum in tenebris (1968)
- In the Name of Peace (1971), an opera
- To Love and Peace (1973)
- Return to the Future (1985)
- The Four Seasons (1986)
