= Roger Myers =

Roger Myers may refer to:

- Roger Myers (businessman) (born 1947), British businessman, co-founder of a chain of public houses
- Roger E. Myers (died 2024), Australian/American concert violist and academic
- C. Roger Myers (1906–1985), Canadian psychologist

== See also ==
- Roger Meyers Jr. and Roger Meyers Sr., characters on the fictional animated series The Itchy & Scratchy Show
