= Elizette Bayan =

Portuguese opera singer (1938–2025)

- Born: Maria Elizette de Magalhães Melo Bayan; 28 October 1938; Viseu, Portugal
- Died: 29 May 2025 (aged 86); Lisbon, Portugal
- Occupation: Opera singer
- Awards: Grand Officer of the Order of Prince Henry

Maria Elizette de Magalhães Melo Bayan (1938–2025) was a Portuguese opera soprano who performed both in Portugal and internationally.

== Early life ==
Bayan was born in Viseu, Portugal on 28 October 1938. She first sang with an orchestra at the age of ten in Coimbra. She learnt piano and singing with her mother before studying singing at the National Conservatory of Music in Lisbon (Conservatório Nacional de Lisboa). She then went to the Mozarteum University Salzburg in Austria before studying at the Accademia Musicale Chigiana in Siena, Italy, benefitting from a scholarship from the Calouste Gulbenkian Foundation. Among others, she studied with Gino Bechi.

== Career ==
Bayan debuted professionally in 1967 in the role of Rosina in Rossini's opera The Barber of Seville, with the then Portuguese Opera Company (CPO) at the Teatro da Trindade in Lisbon. In 1969, after an international competition in Salzburg, she was chosen to participate in Mozart Week, later repeating her performance in Brussels and Ghent in Belgium. While still in Salzburg, she sang for the radio station, ORF. Two years later gave concerts in the Rittersaal of the Salzburg Residenz, under the direction of conductors Paul Müller, Winfried Bauernfeind, and Michael Mann. She also sang the Stabat Mater, a 13th-century Christian hymn, under the direction of Harald Gattermair.

Bayan premiered the cantata Dom Garcia by the Portuguese composer, Joly Braga Santos (op. 44), at the Vilar de Mouros Festival in 1971. She participated in several sacred music concerts, under the direction of conductors such as Michel Corboz and Werner Andreas Albert, at the Gulbenkian Foundation and in Lisbon Cathedral. In Paris, she worked at French Radio and Television (RTF) and at the Portuguese Cultural Centre, under the direction of Corboz. During her career she sang with tenors such as Plácido Domingo, José Carreras, and Alfredo Kraus, and the baritone, Renato Bruson.

She was a resident singer at the Teatro Nacional de São Carlos in Lisbon, where she played many leading roles and continued to premiere new works by composers such as Braga Santos and António Vitorino de Almeida. Her stage performances outside Portugal included Rossini's La scala di seta (The Silken Ladder) at the Vienna Chamber Opera. One of her career highlights was at the Teatro Massimo Bellini in Catania in Sicily Italy, in Bellini's opera I puritani (The Puritans) conducted by Albert, in which she sang an encore of the aria "Qui la voce sua soave…".

== Awards and honours ==
Bayan was awarded the Tomás Alcaide Prize in 1971. In the same year she was awarded the Bordalo Prize. In 2005, on the occasion of International Women's Day she was made a Grand Officer of the Order of Prince Henry by the Portuguese president, Jorge Sampaio.

== Death ==
Bayan died on 29 May 2025. She was buried in the Olivais cemetery in Lisbon.
