= Larry Rachleff =

American conductor and educator (1955–2022)

Larry Rachleff (August 25, 1955 – August 8, 2022) was an American conductor and educator.

== Education ==
Larry Rachleff was born in New York City and pursued his early education in music at the University of Connecticut, where he earned a Bachelor of Music degree. He went on to study conducting at the University of Michigan, receiving a Master of Music degree under the guidance of Gustav Meier. During his formative years, Rachleff further honed his craft through participation in conducting workshops and masterclasses, including sessions with distinguished mentors like Seiji Ozawa and Kurt Masur.

== Career ==
Rachleff's professional career spanned several decades and included positions with a range of orchestras, symphonies, and academic institutions. He directed the Rhode Island Philharmonic Orchestra from 1996 until 2017. Under his direction, the orchestra gained recognition for its diverse programming and commitment to music education in the community.

Rachleff served as the music director of the San Antonio Symphony from 2004 to 2008. The symphony's board of directors cited Rachleff's unwillingness to reside in San Antonio as their primary reason for not renewing his contract beyond the 2007–2008 season.

Rachleff was a frequent guest conductor with major orchestras in the United States and abroad, including appearances with the Chicago Symphony, Los Angeles Philharmonic, Houston Symphony, and the Seattle Symphony, among others. His interpretations of standard and contemporary repertoire were noted for their attention to detail and stylistic integrity.

Rachleff also maintained a strong commitment to music education throughout his career. He served as the director of orchestras and the Walter Kris Hubert Professor of Music at Rice University's Shepherd School of Music, a role in which he mentored young conductors and musicians. He was widely respected for his pedagogical approach, combining rigorous technical demands with a deep understanding of the musical text.

He was also associated with a number of summer music festivals and programs, such as the Tanglewood Music Center, the Aspen Music Festival and School, and the International Conducting Workshop & Festival, where he worked closely with young artists and conducted festival performances.

== Recordings ==
- Samuel Adler: Transfiguration (Rhode Island Philharmonic Orchestra, Naxos Records)
- Darius Milhaud: La Création du Monde (Rice University Shepherd School of Music Symphony Orchestra)
- Music of Tower and Bruch (Rice University Shepherd School of Music Symphony Orchestra)
