= António Fragoso =

Portuguese composer (1897–1918)

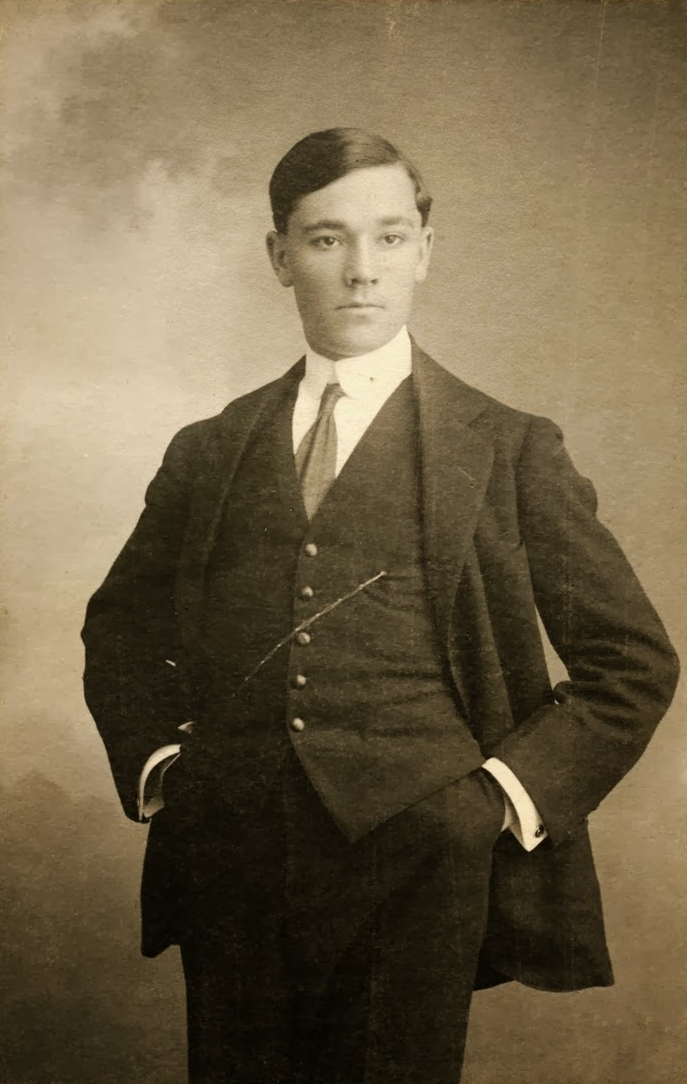
António Fragoso

António de Lima Fragoso (17 June 1897 – 13 October 1918) was a Portuguese composer and pianist.

== Biography ==
Fragoso was born in Pocariça, Cantanhede, in central Portugal. According to the Biblioteca Municipal de Cantanhede, he was given his earliest music lessons by his uncle, Dr. António dos Santos Tovin, and continued after his move to Porto under the supervision of another uncle, who was also Fragoso's godfather, Dr José d´Oliveira Lima. He studied piano with Professor Ernesto Maia.

At Lisbon Conservatoire of music, which he entered aged 17, he studied harmony and score-reading, and piano with Marcos Garin, Tomás Borba and Luís de Freitas Branco. He achieved very high marks in his final examination on 3 July 1918.

He died, aged 21, from influenza on 13 October 1918 in his house in Pocariça.

Producer Manuela Paraíso describes his musical style as "having notable influences of Chopin, Fauré and Debussy", yet also asserts that "his beautiful, melancholy music has an identity of its own".

Today, the Associação António Fragoso exists to commemorate his work, and promote recordings and performances of his music.
