= Leone Stredwick =

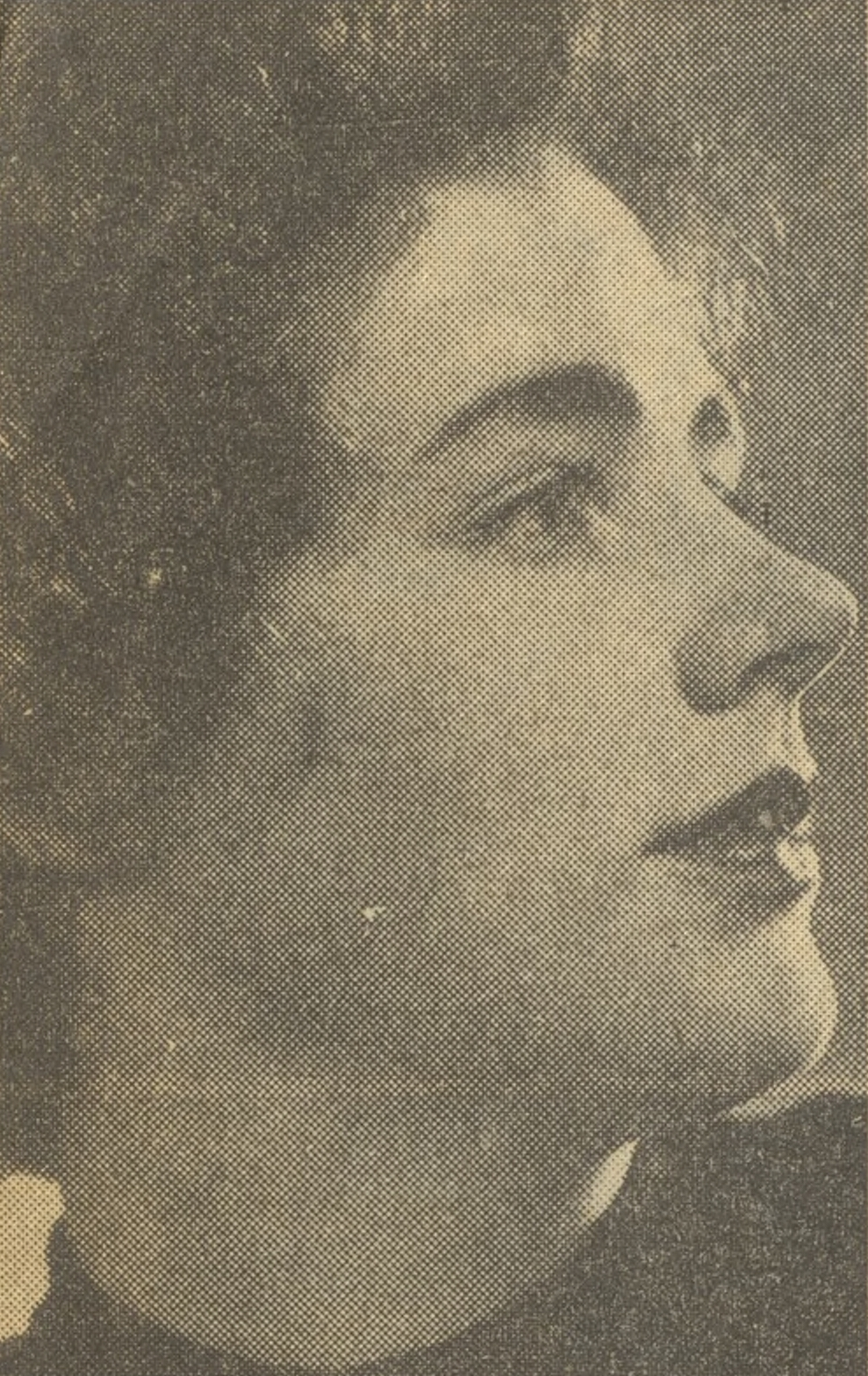
- Leone Stredwick c.1953

Background information
- Also known as: Billie, Leone Myers
- Born: 1928; Grafton, New South Wales, Australia
- Died: 2004 (aged 75–76)
- Occupation: musician
- Instrument: piano
- Years active: 1940s-1960s

Leone "Billie" Stredwick (1928–2004) was an Australian pianist.

== Career ==
Leone Stredwick grew up in Grafton, New South Wales and studied piano at the Sydney Conservatorium at age 15 under Alexander Sverjensky. She won the ABC's 1947 Concerto and Vocal Competition with a solo piano performance, and was a finalist for a Juliliard scholarship.

She moved to London in 1948 for further study, after a scholarship was raised for her, and toured England into the 1950s. At 22 years old, she gave her first solo recital in England at Wigmore Hall.

After returning to Australia, Stredwick performed solo and with the Sydney Symphony Orchestra, and made appearances on radio and television. She returned to England again in 1961, but injured a finger while practising for a BBC recital and was forced to retire.

During the 1970s she began performing again, but was diagnosed with a brain tumour that affected her manual dexterity. Once it was removed she was diagnosed with Parkinson's disease and retired once more. She died in 2004 aged 75.

== Personal life ==
While in London, Stredwick married Australian journalist Hal Myers in 1950. They had been childhood friends, and delayed their marriage so Stredwick could focus on her music career. During the 1960s, they adopted two children Roger and Lucy, who both later pursued careers in music.

Leone Stredwick's sister Maxine played cello, and married a Dutch pianist. Their mother Vera Giovanelli played violin.
