= Ben Nobuto =

- Born: 1996 (age 29–30); Japan
- Origin: Kent, England
- Genres: Contemporary classical; experimental
- Occupation: Composer
- Instruments: Piano; Violin; Percussion
- Years active: 2016–present
- Label: NMC Recordings
- Website: https://bennobuto.com/

Ben Nobuto (born 1996) is a British/Japanese composer of modern classical music. He is best known for works that combine acoustic and electronic sounds and often reference popular culture.

== Education and career ==
Nobuto studied at the University of Cambridge, receiving a BMus and a Mphil in Music. While at Cambridge he received the Bliss Prize for composition.

His piece Serenity 2.0 was commissioned by the Manchester Collective in 2021. This piece for chamber ensemble heavily uses sampling of materials from 1980s Japanese pop, YouTube vlogs, TED Talks, and Baroque music. Serenity 2.0 received a Royal Philharmonic Society award in 2023.

His choral work Sol was commissioned by the National Youth Choir and released on NMC Recordings in 2022. It received an Ivor Novello Award for Best Choral Composition at the 2023 Ivors Classical Awards.

His work Hallelujah Sim was premiered by the BBC Symphony Orchestra, BBC Singers and Elim Chan on the first night of the 2024 BBC Proms at the Royal Albert Hall.
