= Alvin Singleton =

American classical composer

Alvin Singleton (born December 28, 1940, in Brooklyn, New York) is a composer from the United States. Born and raised in New York City, he received his music education from New York University (B.A.), studying with Hall Overton and Charles Wuorinen. Singleton then moved to study at Yale School of Music (M.M.), studying with Yehudi Wyner and Mel Powell. Singleton was a Fulbright Scholar, he studied with Goffredo Petrassi at Accademia Nazionale di Santa Cecilia in Rome from 1971-1985. After living and working in Europe for fourteen years, Singleton returned to the United States to become a Composer-in-Residence with the Atlanta Symphony Orchestra (1985-88). He subsequently served as Resident Composer at Spelman College in Atlanta (1988-91), as UNISYS Composer-in-Residence with the Detroit Symphony Orchestra (1996-97), and was the 2002–03 Composer-in-Residence with the Ritz Chamber Players of Jacksonville, Florida. In addition, he has served as Visiting Professor of Composition at the Yale University School of Music.

Awards

- Recipient of 2003 Guggenheim Fellowship

Singleton's music shows the evidence of a wide range of influences - "from Mahler to Monk, Bird to Bernstein, James Baldwin to Bach, Santana to Prince" - and often incorporates aspects of theatre and surprise. Notable are his set of eight Argoru pieces for various solo instruments, composed over the period from 1968 to 2002. His choral ballet TRUTH (2006), scored for mixed chorus, dancers and an ensemble of 10 instruments, is based on the life of human rights crusader Sojourner Truth. His piano concerto BluesKonzert had its Carnegie Hall debut in 2010 with soloist Ursula Oppens and the American Composers Orchestra.

Albany Records has issued a series of recordings, including Extensions of a Dream (2002, percussion music), Sing to the Sun (2007, choral and chamber music) and Sweet Chariot (2014, solo and chamber music). The Atlanta Symphony Orchestra and Chorus has recorded PraiseMaker. The four string quartets have been recorded by the Momenta Quartet.

== List of compositions ==
A complete list of published compositions can be found on Alvin Singleton's website.

- String Quartet No. 1 (1967)
- Dream Sequence '76 (opera) (1976)
- A Yellow Rose Petal for orchestra (1982)
- After Fallen Crumbs for orchestra (1987)
- Shadows for orchestra (1987)
- String Quartet No.2 Secret Desire to be Black (1988)
- Between Sisters for soprano, alto flute, vibraphone and piano (1990)
- String Quartet No.3 Somehow We Can (1994)
- BluesKonzert for piano and orchestra (1995)
- PraiseMaker for mixed chorus and orchestra (1998)
- Greed Machine for vibraphone and piano (2003)
- When Given a Choice for orchestra (2004)
- TRUTH, choral ballet (2006)
- Brooklyn Bones for chorus and orchestra (2008)
- Different River for orchestra (2012)
- Sweet Chariot, for chamber ensemble (2013)
- Prayer for tenor solo, chamber choir, organ, harp, trumpet, and cello (2016)
- String Quartet No.4 Hallelujah Anyhow (2019)
- Time Past, Time Future for chamber orchestra and vocal ensemble (2023).
