= Landestheater Niederbayern =

Theatre in Lower Bavaria, Germany

Landestheater Niederbayern is a theatre company in Lower Bavaria, Germany, founded in 1952 and offering both musical theater and drama. Under the artistic directorship of Stefan Tilch, it plays at the city theaters of Landshut and Passau, at the Theater am Hagen in Straubing and at other regional venues. Its orchestra is the Niederbayerische Philharmonie (English: Lower Bavarian Philharmonic).

== History ==
In 1952 the Landestheater Neiderbayern was founded under the name "Zweckverband Niederbayerisches Städtebundtheater." Shortly after the end of World War II, the theaters in Landshut, Passau, and Straubing had begun operating independently. As a result of currency reform, the three theaters closed due to financial difficulties in 1950. In February 1952, work was resumed within the framework of the Niederbayerisches Städtebundtheater, at the time still a loose association. The first program included five plays, six operas, and two operettas. In its first year, the theater did not have its own ensemble, so these first productions were cast exclusively with guests. In the same founding year, the current functional division was established, with the acting division being based in Landshut and the musical division in Passau.

On October 5, 1952, the "Zweckverband Niederbayerisches Städtebundtheater" was constituted under the artistic director Erik Wildhagen. Because they also played in venues in Upper Bavaria, they were renamed in 1953 by public law to "Südostbayerisches Städtetheater" (Southeast Bavarian Municipal Theater), the name the theater would bear for the next 55 years. In 1964, the district of Lower Bavaria joined the association. For financial reasons, the association was to be dissolved in 1968/69 at the suggestion of the Bavarian Supreme Audit Office, but the members of the association rejected this.

Because the number of non-Lower Bavarian venues steadily decreased over the years, the special-purpose association decided to change its name to Landestheater Niederbayern in 2008. The theater currently employs around 150 people, including 14 singers, 19 actors, and 42 orchestra musicians. The two departments in Landshut and Passau each have their own independent workshops, tailor shops, technical and administrative teams.
