= Joly Braga Santos =

Portuguese composer and conductor

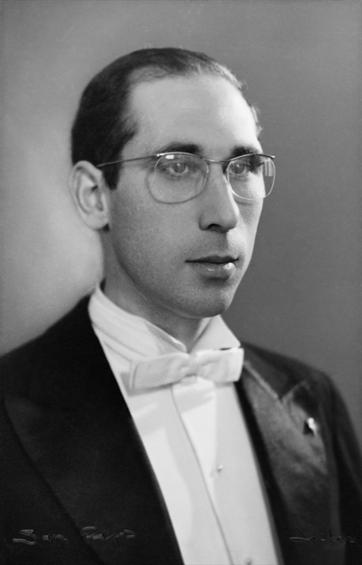
- Braga Santos in 1950
- Born: 14 May 1924; Lisbon, Portugal
- Died: 18 July 1988 (aged 64); Lisbon, Portugal
- Occupations: Composer; Conductor
- Awards: Order of Saint James of the Sword

José Manuel Joly Braga Santos, ComSE (Portuguese pronunciation: [ʒɔˈli ˈbɾaɣɐ ˈsɐ̃tuʃ]; May 14, 1924 – July 18, 1988) was a Portuguese composer and conductor, who was born and died in Lisbon. He wrote six symphonies.

== Biography ==
José Manuel Joly Braga Santos was born in Lisbon in 1924 and died in this city in 1988, at the peak of his musical creativity. He studied violin and composition at the National Conservatoire of Lisbon, and became a disciple of Luís de Freitas Branco (1890–1955), the leading Portuguese composer of the preceding generation.

After the Second World War, he was able to go abroad to study conducting with Hermann Scherchen and Antonino Votto, and composition with Virgilio Mortari. In 1945 he visited England where he met Ralph Vaughan Williams, who encouraged him to use his native folksong in his symphonic music and also suggested that he should take lessons in counterpoint. He was undoubtedly the leading Portuguese symphonist of the 20th century, and perhaps of all time. In addition to an excellent sense of orchestration, his musical language is based on a strong musical architecture as well as drama, with long melodic phrases and a natural instinct for structural development. In his own words, he wanted “to contribute toward a Latin symphonism and to react against the predominant tendency, of the generation that preceded me, to reject monumentalism in music”.

In his first works, the composer showed a modal tendency motivated by the desire to establish a connection between contemporary music and the golden age of Portuguese music: the Renaissance. We also find a melodic outline of the oldest folk songs of his country. Although he was not particularly interested in the Portuguese folklore, studying and composing at the country home of his mentor, in the rural south of Portugal - the Alentejo - he accepted the influence of the very old local folklore that he considered "of mesmerizing originality and grandeur".

The first four symphonies, which followed each other quite rapidly (between the ages of 22 and 27), were immediately performed by the Portuguese Radio Symphony Orchestra in Lisbon, and met with great success. The conductor and founder of the Portuguese Radio Symphony Orchestra was the great Portuguese conductor Pedro de Freitas Branco, a friend of Maurice Ravel, Manuel de Falla, and former director of the Orchestre Lamoureux. Pedro de Freitas Branco early recognised Braga Santos's talent and launched his international career during the 1950s during which the composer conducted several international premieres of his works around Europe. Other works of this period are the Concerto for Strings, Variations on an Alentejo Theme, and three Symphonic Overtures. Most of the works were recorded, from the 1970s onwards, by the Portuguese label Strauss SP, and more recently, by the Naxos / Marco Polo label.

Following closely the works of post-war European composers, his style became, from 1960 onwards, more chromatic. The period of travel and the time he devoted to conducting provided him with what he described as a useful period of rest, decisive for the evolution of his musical style toward increased chromaticism and less traditional form. To this period belong the works Three Symphonic Sketches, Sinfonietta, the Requiem, his 5th and 6th Symphonies, and Divertimento no. 2.

Braga Santos also wrote three operas, chamber music for a wide variety of instruments and ensembles, film scores, and several choral works based on poems from the great classical and modern Portuguese and Spanish poets such as Camões, Antero de Quental, Teixeira de Pascoaes, Fernando Pessoa, Garcilaso de la Vega, Antonio Machado and Rosalía de Castro.

Braga Santos lectured on composition at the National Conservatoire of Lisbon, where he introduced the chair of Musical Analysis. He was also director of the Oporto Symphony Orchestra and one of the founders of the Juventude Musical Portuguesa (Portuguese Musical Youth). As a critic and journalist he produced a vast range of work for several Portuguese and foreign newspapers and journals.

He died in Lisbon of a stroke.

== Awards ==
The Three Symphonic Sketches (1962) were distinguished by Donemus in 1963, and the 5th Symphony, by the «Tribune Internationale des Compositeurs» (UNESCO) in 1966.

In 2004, the recording of the Symphony No. 4 by Naxos/Marco Polo, performed by the National Symphony Orchestra of Ireland and conducted by Álvaro Cassuto received the Cannes Classical Award for the CD Premier category.

== Honors ==
In 1977, Joly Braga Santos was distinguished with the Order of Santiago de Espada by António Ramalho Eanes, the President of the Portuguese Republic.

== Works ==
=== Stage ===
- Mérope, opera in three acts, based on a play by Almeida Garrett (1958)
- Encruzilhada (Crossings), ballet in one act (1967)
- Trilogia das Barcas, opera based on three plays by Gil Vicente (1969)

=== Symphonies ===
- Symphony No. 1 in D (1946)
- Symphony No. 2 in B minor (1947)
- Symphony No. 3 in C (1949)
- Symphony No. 4 in E minor (1950)
- Symphony No. 5 Virtus lusitaniae (1966)
- Symphony No. 6, for soprano, choir and orchestra (1972)

=== Orchestral ===
- Symphonic Overture No. 1 (1946)
- Symphonic Overture No. 2 Lisboa (1947)
- Nocturne for Strings (1947)
- Elegy to Vianna da Motta (1948)
- Concerto for Strings in D (1951)
- Variations on an Alentejo Theme (1951)
- Symphonic Overture No. 3 (1953)
- Symphonic Prelude (1955)
- Intermezzo (1956)
- Divertimento No. 1 (1961)
- Three Symphonic Sketches (1962)
- Sinfonietta for Strings (1963)
- Variations Concertantes for strings and harp (1967)
- Divertimento No. 2 (1978)
- Staccato Brilhante (1988)

=== Concertante ===
- Viola Concerto (1960)
- Concerto for Violin, Cello, Harp and String Orchestra (1968)
- Piano Concerto (1973)
- Cello Concerto (1987)

=== Chamber/Instrumental ===
- Nocturne for violin and piano (1942)
- Aria I for cello and piano (1943)
- Siciliana for piano (1944)
- String Quartet No. 1 in D minor (1945)
- Piano Quartet (1957)
- String Quartet No. 2 (1958)
- Aria II for cello and piano (1977)
- Aria a Tre con variazioni for clarinet, viola and piano (1984)
- Dance Suite for oboe, viola, bass and piano (1984)
- Piano Trio (1985)
- Suite for Wind Instruments (1985)
- String Sextet (1986)
- Improviso for clarinet and piano (1988)

=== Choral/Vocal ===
- Four Songs on Poems by Fernando Pessoa for soprano and piano (1943)
- Three Sonnets by Camões for mezzo-soprano or baritone and orchestra (1947)
- Acordando - Sonnet by Antero de Quental, for mezzo-soprano and orchestra (1944)
- Requiem in memoriam of Pedro de Freitas Branco (1964)
- Two Motets for a cappella choir (1975)
- Cantares Gallegos for soprano and orchestra (1983)
- Aquella Tarde for soprano or tenor and orchestra (1988)

== Discography ==
- Symphony 3
- Concerto for Strings, Sinfonietta, Variationes Concertantes, Concerto for violin, cello, strings and harp
- Symphony 4

== Sources ==
- Latino, Adriana. "Santos, Joly Braga", Grove Music Online, ed. L. Macy (Accessed July 8, 2007), (subscription access)
- Who's Who in Music,
- Marquis Who's Who,
- Dictionnaire de La Musique (Marc Honnegger)
- The World of Twentieth-Century Music.
- Delgado, Alexandre "A Sinfonia Em Portugal" ed. Caminho Da Musica (ISBN 972-21-1472-7)
