= Anima Eterna =

- Orchestra
- Founded: 1987
- Location: Brussels, Belgium
- Principal conductor: (post vacant)
- Website: https://animaeterna.be

Anima Eterna is a Belgian symphony orchestra administratively based in Bruges. Founded in 1987 by Jos van Immerseel, Anima Eterna is resident at the Concertgebouw, Bruges.

== History ==
In 1987, van Immerseel founded a baroque ensemble with a handful of instrumentalists he had formed around him two years earlier, with whom he performs historical orchestrations of the early instrument repertoire. In 1988, he performed Marc-Antoine Charpentier's Les plaisirs de Versailles H.480 at the Royal Opera of Versailles, directed by Philippe Lenael. Over the years, the orchestra has grown to become a full symphony orchestra, and its repertoire has expanded to include classical, romantic and contemporary music.

Since the 2020–2021 season, conductors including Giovanni Antonini, Bart Van Reyn, Jakob Lehmann and Pablo Heras-Casado have conducted the orchestra, with van Immerseel remaining guest conductor of the ensemble. On 16 September 2024, the board of directors of Anima Eterna announced the severance of ties with van Immerseel, on the grounds of "repeated aggressive behaviour and ongoing breaches of his contractual obligations".
