= Rhode Island Philharmonic Orchestra =

The Rhode Island Philharmonic Orchestra is an American orchestra and music school based in Providence, Rhode Island. Founded in 1945 and colloquially referred to as the RI Philharmonic, the orchestra's performing home is Veterans Memorial Auditorium in Providence. The RI Philharmonic is the largest combined professional orchestra and music school in the USA.

== History ==
Francis Madeira founded the orchestra in 1945, and served as its first conductor and music director until his retirement in 1978. Álvaro Cassuto succeeded Madeira as music director from 1979 to 1985. Andrew Massey then served as music director from 1986 to 1991. Zuohuang Chen followed as music director, from 1992 to 1996. Larry Rachleff served as RI Philharmonic music director from 1996 to 2017.

In September 2018, Bramwell Tovey became artistic advisor to the RI Philharmonic. In December 2021, the orchestra announced a change in Tovey's title to principal conductor and artistic director, and in parallel an extension of his contract through August 2026. Tovey held these titles until his death in July 2022.

Following Tovey's death, the orchestra named Tania Miller as its interim principal conductor in August 2022, for the 2022–2023 season. the first titled female conductor in the orchestra's history. In September 2023, Robert Spano first guest-conducted the RI Philharmonic. In January 2024, the orchestra announced the appointment of Spano as its principal conductor, with immediate effect. Spano stood down as the orchestra's principal conductor at the close of the 2024–2025 season, and subsequently took the title of principal guest conductor of the orchestra.

In February 2023, Ruth Reinhardt made her first guest-conducting appearance with the orchestra. She returned for a second guest-conducting appearance in January 2024. In June 2024, the Rhode Island Philharmonic announced the appointment of Reinhardt as its next music director, effective with the 2025–2026 season. She took the title of music director-designate with immediate effect. Reinhardt is the second titled female conductor in the orchestra's history, and the first female conductor to be named music director of the Rhode Island Philharmonic.

== Music directors ==
- Francis Madeira (1945–1978)
- Álvaro Cassuto (1979–1985)
- Andrew Massey (1986–1991)
- Zuohuang Chen (1992–1996)
- Larry Rachleff (1996–2017)
- Ruth Reinhardt (2025–present)

== Other conductors in leadership positions ==
- Bramwell Tovey (principal conductor and artistic director, 2021–2022)
- Tania Miller (interim principal conductor, 2022–2023)
- Robert Spano (principal conductor, 2024–2025)

== Music school ==
The RI Philharmonic is the only fully integrated professional orchestra and music school in United States. Alan Fox founded the music school component of the organisation, which educates over 1,500 students statewide on a weekly basis, with education of an additional 13,000 students through periodic partnerships, residencies, education concerts and in-school performances. The educational programme of the school spans includes classical music, popular music, jazz, and rhythm & blues.

In December 2006, the RI Philharmonic moved into a permanent facility on Waterman Avenue in East Providence. Known as the Carter Center for Music Education & Performance since the autumn of 2008, the facility houses the organisation's administrative offices and is the only facility of its kind in Rhode Island. In the autumn of 2011, the facility added an electronic keyboard and technology lab.
