= Ruth Reinhardt =

German conductor

Ruth Reinhardt (born 1988, Saarbrücken) is a German conductor.

== Biography ==
Born into a family of medical doctors, Reinhardt received her early education in the Altenkessel district of Saarbrücken. She studied the violin and oboe as a youth, and also sang in the children's choir of the Saarland State Theater. She played in several youth orchestras, and also played chamber music in a string quartet from age 12. At age 15, whilst in a music workshop in France as an oboist in a youth orchestra, she began to develop an interest in conducting.

At age 17, Reinhardt composed a children's opera based on the book Das kleine Gespenst by Otfried Preußler. Reinhardt conducted the opera at the Alte Feuerwache of the Theater Saarbrücken.

Reinhardt continued her musical education at the Zurich University of the Arts (Zürcher Hochschule der Künste), where her violin teachers included Rudolf Koelman. She also studied conducting with Constantin Trinks and Johannes Schlaefl. Her conducting work in Zurich included conducting the premieres of two chamber operas for children, The Little Mermaid by Michal Muggli and Wassilissa by Dennis Bäsecke. Additional music studies followed at the University of Music and Theatre Leipzig. She subsequently received a scholarship to the Juilliard School, where her conducting teachers included Alan Gilbert and James Ross.

In the US, Reinhardt was a conducting fellow with the Seattle Symphony for the 2015–2016 season. She was assistant conductor of the Dallas Symphony Orchestra from 2016 to 2018. For the 2017–2018 season, she was also a Dudamel Fellow at the Los Angeles Philharmonic.

In February 2023, Reinhardt made her first guest-conducting appearance with the Rhode Island Philharmonic Orchestra (RI Philharmonic). She returned for a second guest-conducting appearance with the RI Philharmonic in January 2024. In June 2024, the RI Philharmonic announced the appointment of Reinhardt as its next music director, effective with the 2025–2026 season. She took the title of music director-designate with immediate effect. This appointment marks Reinhardt's first leadership post. Reinhardt is the second titled female conductor in the orchestra's history, and the first female conductor to be named music director of the Rhode Island Philharmonic.

Cultural offices
Preceded by Robert Spano (principal conductor)	Music Director, Rhode Island Philharmonic Orchestra; 2025–present	Succeeded by incumbent
