= Frederico de Freitas =

Frederico Guedes de Freitas (born Lisbon, Portugal; 15 November 1902 – 12 January 1980) was a Portuguese composer, conductor, musicologist, and pedagogue.

== Life and career ==
De Freitas studied at the National Conservatory, winning the Composition Prize in 1926 for his Nocturno for cello and piano. He also served as conductor of the Portuguese Broadcasting Company's chamber orchestra, as well as the assistant director of its symphony. In 1940 he created the Lisbon Choral Society, and from 1949 to 1953 he led the Oporto Symphony.

De Freitas composed in many different genres. His music ranges from polytonal to nationalist and pictorial in character. His works include a radio opera, ballets, and many other orchestral compositions, in addition to vocal, chamber music, and piano pieces.
