= Roger E. Myers =

Australian-American violist and academic

Roger Elgin Myers
- Born: Sydney, Australia
- Died: February 24, 2024
- Occupations: Concert violist and academic

Academic background
- Education: B.Mus., Viola performance M.Mus., Viola performance
- Alma mater: University of Southern California

Academic work
- Institutions: University of Texas at Austin
- Website: http://rogermyersviola.com/

Roger Elgin Myers FRSA (died February 24, 2024) was an Australian/American concert violist and academic. He was Fellow of the Florence Thelma Hall Centennial Chair in Music and Professor of Viola at the University of Texas at Austin.

Myers played in Carnegie Hall, the Kennedy Center, Disney Hall and the Sydney Opera House, and played with the London and New Zealand Symphony Orchestras. His released albums include Fantasy and Farewell and Viola Music of the Bach Family. He was a Fellow of the Royal Society of Arts, Guild of Musicians and Singers and Fraternity of Saint Cecilia.

== Early life and education ==
Myers was born and raised in Sydney, Australia. His father Hal, had a piano background and (while a political journalist) was also a periodic music critic for the Sydney Morning Herald newspaper. His mother Leone (née Stredwick) was an Australian concert pianist and exerted a large musical influence on him.

Myers was educated at Sydney Grammar School and at the Sydney Conservatorium of Music. While at Sydney Grammar School, he was engaged professionally at the age of 12 to sing in three productions with Opera Australia as a boy soprano.

Before leaving to study in the United States in 1987, Myers played with the Sydney Symphony Orchestra and his Sydney Conservatorium String Quartet was invited to become the international quartet in residence at Michigan State University. Later he studied under Donald McInnes at the University of Southern California gaining his Bachelors and master's degrees in Viola performance.

== Career ==
Myers served as faculty of the Idyllwild Arts Summer Music Program in California and taught at the Beijing International Music Festival and Academy and the International School for Musical Arts in Canada. He has also taught at Music Academy of the West, Bowdoin Summer Music Festival, the Montecito Festival, Green Mountain Chamber Music Festival, the International Festival Institute at Round Top, and the Marrowstone Music Festival. Myers was a regular performer at the Festival de Musique at St. Barthelemy and was an artist at the Kansas Sunflower Festival and the Buzzards Bay Music-fest in Massachusetts.

He was the founder and artistic director of the Blanton Chamber Music Series at the Blanton Museum in Austin. In 1997, he served as the artistic director and Host Chairman of the XXV Silver Anniversary International Viola Congress.

Along with his career as a violist, Myers also held academic appointments. He was a Professor and the former Head of The String Division at the University of Texas at Austin, Butler School of Music.

Myers gave numerous chamber music performances with artists including Lynn Harrell, Jorja Fleezanis, Daniel Heifetz, Alex Klein, Mark O’Connor, Ronald Leonard and Martin Lovett. He performed with the Los Angeles Chamber Orchestra, as principal violist with the Santa Fe Pro Musica and played with the New West Symphony Orchestra in Los Angeles as principal viola on tour with Andrea Bocelli.

In 2004, he performed as a featured soloist on the 100th birthday tribute concert to the violist William Primrose at the XXXII International Viola Congress. In the following year, he made his Carnegie Hall debut. Myers also performed a number of world premieres, including the Piano Quintet by Kevin Puts in 2006 and the World Premiere of Michael McLean's Suite for Viola and Orchestra in 2008. In the following year, Myers played in the Mid-West Premiere of violinist Mark O’Connor's Third String Quartet with the composer. In 2011, he performed the world premiere of a viola concerto by Peter Askim at the Walt Disney Concert Hall, and in 2017, Myers performed as soloist in the World Premiere of the newly orchestrated version of the Schumann Märchenbilder by Michael McLean with the New Zealand Symphony Orchestra

On February 25, 2024, he died due to cancer.

== Reception ==
=== Fantasy and Farewell ===
Myers' album, Fantasy and Farewell, was released in 2013 and called by the American Record Guide as "a masterpiece". Myers' playing in the album was reviewed by The Strad Magazine as possessing "consistently beautiful tone and unshakeable aplomb."

In a review, Fanfare Magazine stated that "the viola is clearly entering a golden age with young performers like Myers himself," while according to American Record Guide, "the Australian violist Roger Myers is an excellent player, and the London Symphony sounds spectacular." In a review, The Contrapuntist wrote that in Fantasy and Farewell, "Myers performs with an infinite range of color and impeccable technique" and that "the album will make a great addition to any violist’s collection."

=== Viola Music of the Bach Family ===
Myers released his album, Viola Music of the Bach Family with Céline Frisch in 2017. His album features works for viola and harpsichord. It is the recipient of two Global Music Awards Silver Medals.

The album is reviewed as "a recording not to be missed by Early Music fans" in which "Myers is a marvel throughout".

== Awards and honors ==
- 2007 - School of Music Teaching Excellence Award, University of Texas at Austin
- 2014 - Fantasy and Farewell awarded "Best of Show" and 2 Gold Medals, Global Music Awards
- 2014 - Elected a Fellow of the Royal Society of Arts
- 2016 - Elected a Fellow of the Guild of Musicians and Singers
- 2017 - 2 Silver Medals awarded to CD Album, "Viola Music of the Bach Family", Global Music Awards
- 2019 - Fellow of the Fraternity of Saint Cecilia

== Discography ==
- Fantasy and Farewell (2013)
- Viola Music of the Bach Family (2017)
