= Luís de Freitas Branco =

Portuguese composer, musicologist, and professor of music (1890–1955)

Luís Maria da Costa de Freitas Branco
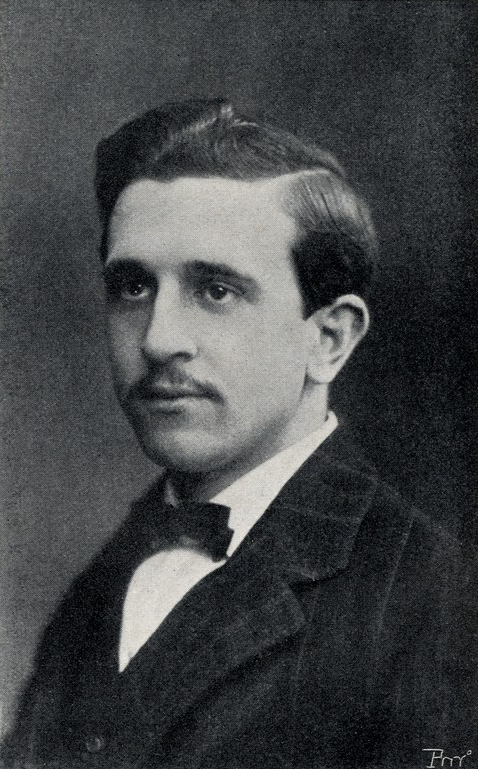
- Freitas Branco, c. 1911
- Born: 12 October 1890; Lisbon, Portugal
- Died: 27 November 1955 (aged 65); Lisbon, Portugal
- Occupations: Composer; Musicologist; Academic teacher

Luís Maria da Costa de Freitas Branco (12 October 1890 – 27 November 1955) was a Portuguese composer, musicologist, and professor of music who played a pre-eminent part in the development of Portuguese music in the first half of the 20th century.

== Life ==
Luís Maria da Costa de Freitas Branco was born in Lisbon into an aristocratic family who for centuries had had close ties to the royal family in Portugal. His brother, Pedro, was a conductor.

Luís had a cosmopolitan education, studied piano and violin beginning in childhood and began composing at a precocious age. He studied music in Berlin and Paris, where he worked with Engelbert Humperdinck and other composers. He returned to Portugal and became professor of composition starting in 1916 at the Lisbon Conservatory of Music, where he became a leading force in restructuring musical education. There he taught, among many others, Joly Braga Santos.

During the 1930s he increasingly encountered political difficulties with the authorities and was finally forced into retirement from his official duties in 1939. He continued to compose, however, and to pursue his research into Portuguese early music, publishing several books and numerous articles. His book about the musical works of King John IV of Portugal (1603–1656), an accomplished composer who introduced new music to Portugal, was published only in the year after Branco's death.

He married Estela Diniz de Ávila e Sousa, born on 18 August 1892, daughter of João Deodato de Ávila e Sousa (born São Jorge Island, Velas, 10 November 1861) and wife Margarida Diniz; the couple had no children.

Branco had a son out of wedlock by Maria Clara Dambert Filgueiras, of French descent:

- João de Freitas Branco (Lisbon, 10 January 1922 – 17 November 1989, Caxias, Lisbon), married first to Maria Helena von Hoffmann de Barros de Abreu, daughter of António de Barros de Abreu, a lawyer, and wife German Marie Anna Helena von Hoffmann, three children; married again in 1954, to Maria Isabel do Nascimento, one son.

Luís Maria da Costa de Freitas Branco died in Lisbon, aged 65.

== Works (selection) ==
=== Symphonies ===
- Symphony No. 1 in F major (1924)
- Symphony No. 2 in B-flat major (1926)
- Symphony No. 3 in E minor (1944)
- Symphony No. 4 in D major (1952)

=== Symphonic poems ===
- Antero de Quental – symphonic poem (1907), named after the poet Antero de Quental (1842–1891)
- After a Reading of Júlio Diniz, Symphonic Poem (1908; lost)
- After a Reading of Guerra Junqueiro, Symphonic Poem (1909)
- Paraísos Artificiais (Artificial Paradises) – symphonic poem (1910)
- Vathek, Symphonic Poem in the form of variations on an Oriental Theme (1913)
- Viriato, Symphonic Poem (1916)
- Solemnia Verba – symphonic poem (1951)

=== Orchestral works ===
- Scherzo Fantastique (1907)
- Tentações de S. Frei Gil (St. Friar Gil's Temptations), Suite (1911)
- Alentejo Suite No. 1 (1919)
- Alentejo Suite No. 2 (1927)
- Abertura Solene «1640» (1939)
- Hommage to Chopin (in the form of a Polka) (1949; lost)

=== Concertante works ===
- Cena Lírica (Lyric Scene) for Cello and Orchestra (1916)
- Violin Concerto (1916)
- Ballade for Piano and Orchestra (1917)
- Variations and Triple Fugue on and Original Theme for String Orchestra and Organ (1946–47)

=== Choir and orchestra ===
- Manfred, dramatic symphony for soloists, choir and orchestra (1905–06)
- The Temptation of Holy Father Gil, oratorio for soloists, choir, and orchestra (1911/12; destroyed)
- Canto do Natal, for choir, orchestra and organ (1926)
- Noemi, biblical cantata for soloist, choir, orchestra and organ (1937–39)

=== Solo voice and orchestra ===
- That Girl for soprano or tenor and orchestra (1904)
- Sonnet by Camões / The Beauty of Fresca Serra for soprano and orchestra (1907 – orchestrated 1935)
- Portuguese Song / Song of the Tejo River for soprano or tenor and orchestra (1907 – orchestrated 1929)
- Song of the Sea for soprano or tenor and orchestra (1918)
- Commiato / Farewell, dramatic scene for baritone (or bass) and orchestra (1920 – orchestrated 1949)
- Eight Portuguese Popular Songs for soprano and orchestra (1943 – orchestrated 1951)

=== String orchestra ===
- The Death of Manfred for strings (1906)
- Two melodies for string orchestra (1909)
- Lento [from the 1911 String Quartet, version for string orchestra]
- Temptation of Death, from The Temptations of Holy Father Gil (1911–12)
- Variations and Triple Fugue on an Original Theme for string orchestra (1946–47) [version without organ]

=== Chamber music ===
- The Death of Manfred for a sextet of 2 violins, violet, 2 cellos and double bass (1906)
- Commemorative March for violin, cello and piano (1908)
- Trio for violin, cello and piano (1908)
- 1st Sonata for Violin and Piano (1908)
- Prelude and Fugue for solo violin (1910) [not located]
- Prelude for violin and piano (1910)
- String Quartet (1911)
- Sonata for Cello and Piano (1913)
- Theme and Variations for three harps and string quartet (s/d – 1920/21?)
- 2nd Sonata for Violin and Piano (1928)

== Selected discography ==
- Madrigais Camonianos. Three series with total 28 madrigals on texts by Luís de Camões. Coro Gulbenkian, conducted by Fernando Eldoro. PortugalSom PS 5010, 2008.
- Violin Sonatas; Carlos Damas, violin; Anna Tomasik, piano, Naxos, 2010.

== Use of his music in film ==
- Douro, Faina Fluvial (1931) by Manoel de Oliveira, in its second version
- Wild Cattle (1934)
- Mistérios de Lisboa (2010) by Raúl Ruiz
