= Indie classical =

Genre of music

The "indie classical" genre is generally used to describe the music that follows certain classical music practices but is produced and distributed through independent record labels. The term was brought into widespread circulation by New Amsterdam Records's publicity apparatus, intended to represent composers whose "music slips through the cracks between genres." The term "indie classical" became controversial and by 2013, it had been strongly resisted by participants in the very community that the record label initially sought to describe. The term remains unsettled and its use has declined, although currently it is sometimes used interchangeably with "alt-classical" or "neo-classical", generally as a marketing label for music that crosses over between classical and other popular genres, associating artists who have little in common with the original movement.

== Terminology ==
According to composer and co-founder of New Amsterdam Records, Judd Greenstein, the intention behind the term "indie classical" was a shorthand description of the kind of music they were making under a "do-it-yourself" institutional spirit. Both Judd Greenstein and composer Matt McBane have hesitantly taken credit for inventing the term. Others use it to describe composers and artists who seem to operate outside the established tradition in both style and technique. For New Amsterdam, indie classical was not intended to provide a context with which to comprehend its individual albums and compositions, but a term to brand the label's identity and describe its innovations in the classical music market. The term's usefulness is still debatable, and because it was promoted by publicists and accepted by journalists, "indie classical" could also be dismissed as outsider public relations jargon. Peter McCallum criticized its linguistic vagueness, describing it as a "lazy term, a marketer's 'too-hard' basket, avoiding the hard work of tracing musical lineage".

== History ==
Although the term "indie classical" had appeared in Billboard magazine as far back as 1950 in reference to "small-scale classical record labels", the current use of the term can be traced to New Amsterdam Records, established in 2007 by composers William Brittelle, Sarah Kirkland Snider and Judd Greenstein. These composers wanted to carve out a place for themselves and for other composers who did not feel represented within "contemporary classical music" or "new music", which lead to the creation of their record label. In a December 2007 press release, they proclaimed that their mission was to represent "music without walls, from a scene without a name". This announcement was accompanied by their website which sought to "foster a sense of connection among musicians and fans in this 'indie classical' scene", effectively ascribing a name to it.

Parallel to New Amsterdam's evolution, other independent record labels pursuing similar objectives had emerged. Labels such as Nonclassical and Bedroom Community germinated as an effort by traditionally trained composers to find a niche and defy convention.

=== Controversy ===
As the term continued to spread through the public and major publications, indie classical soon became a source of contention online, and media outlets used their own criteria to decide which artists were included in the movement. The online music magazine Pitchfork expanded the genre to include indie rock artists like Sufjan Stevens and Jonny Greenwood, and situated the movement as a successor to the minimalist scene of downtown New York and the group Bang on a Can.

Nico Muhly, an established American composer with an international reputation, had become the poster child of indie classical for many writers. In a contentious blog post, he expressed his aversion to it, saying that "nothing is gained by that description, even if it makes the PR people's jobs easier. It attracts haters and lumps people together in a way that belies how actual communities of musicians function." Muhly's commentary articulated the problematic stylistic associations with indie music, and his criticism noticeably affected the integrity of the indie classical term, debilitating its utilization and tarnishing it as a negative qualifier. The cultural capital that indie classical as a brand helped its community gain – the success in reaching a Pitchfork demographic, and the success of Muhly as a spokesperson for his scene – ultimately undermined that strength and led to its abandonment. Greenstein and his colleagues became uncomfortable with the utilization of indie classical to represent a single aesthetic, and by 2013 the label had ceased using the term. Their current mission statement is to support "composers and performers whose work transcends traditional and outdated genre distinctions".

== Ideology ==
The indie classical movement was a direct reaction against the conservatism of classical conservatory training and the insulation of popular music genre boundaries. According to Ginanne Mitic: "The generation coming up now in classical music are frustrated by the isolation of classical music and a lot have grown up other genres of music as well ... [indie classical] is a way of doing classical music that are not the old ways ... certainly and deliberately it has overtones with indie rock that are homemade, new and out on the edge." This discontent with academia encourages musicians to find a new community, and the resultant cross-pollination encourages a DIY attitude out of necessity. Bryce Dessner explains how the Kronos Quartet delineated the perfect ethos for this movement: "non-profit, artist-driven, and with their own record labels. The precursor to this was punk rock and the DIY culture of the early '80s."

In addition, the musicians began to question the role of the composer above other musicians, explicitly highlighting the importance of the collective nature in their works. Initially, the term was specifically sought after by the composers themselves, as opposed to being imposed upon them as a marketing label. However, after the controversy some composers preferred a "post-genre" label; they had to be more aggressive about defining their own identity, given the media's predisposition to classify them as "classical".

=== Modes of dissemination ===
The independent distribution of the music was at the core of this movement. Co-creator of New Amsterdam Records, Judd Greenstein, clarified that the term was "not about the sound of the music ... instead it is used to describe the approach to disseminating that music, and framing it for potential audiences." One major distinction in indie classical is regarding monetization. While other music navigates through the commercial marketplace, the indie classical movement is mainly monetized through the nonprofit world. This directly limits the type and size of audiences, which is why the scene remains under the radar of mainstream listeners.

== Music ==
Linked by an ethos more than a musical approach, the indie classical movement encompasses a wide range of styles while evading an overarching aesthetic idiosyncrasy. The biggest problem when considering indie classical as a musical genre is that their music does not have a shared sound. Composer Missy Mazzoli describes it as "more of a social movement than a musical one". These circumstances make it challenging to pinpoint collective musical features. Some artists, particularly within the New Amsterdam label, display certain compositional and aesthetic aspects of postminimalism: a steady pulse, additive and subtractive procedures, and tonality that is diatonic but non-functional. Isaac Schankler hesitantly outlines musical qualities of the movement: influences by pop, rock and/or minimalism; rejection of the traditional distinction between 'high culture' and 'low culture'; resistance to genre identifiers, or a musical embodiment of a cultural anxiety.

Some important traits of these musicians are the inherited practices from their classical training: prominent use of notation for learning and performing the music, a reserved audience behaviour, and mastery of the technical possibilities in their instrument. As Muhly explains: "What you have here is classically trained composers relinquishing control ... and replacing it with a type of community music-making more commonly found in rock bands."

=== Geography and venues ===
Initially, the movement originated from composers in the United States, more specifically from downtown Manhattan and Brooklyn. Afterwards, artists from European countries like Iceland and England began to associate themselves with the indie classical movement. The Spotify "Indie Classical" playlist, the most popular of its kind with over eighty thousand followers, shows that 66% of the artists are from the United States, 12% from Iceland, and 9% from the United Kingdom.

Venue choice was crucial in the success of this music; artists seemed as comfortable performing in bars and nightclubs as they did in concert halls. In New York, the most important venues to the indie classical scene were cross-cultural venues such as Manhattan's (Le) Poisson Rouge and the Cathedral of St. John the Divine. In the UK, the Nonclassical record label presented their showcases as if they were rock gigs, hosting a monthly club night at The Macbeth in the East End of London.

== Related composers ==
Some composers that are linked to this genre are Gabriel Kahane, Judd Greenstein, Caroline Shaw, Sarah Kirkland Snider, David Lang, Missy Mazzoli, Nico Muhly, Anna Meredith, Gabriel Prokofiev, William Brittelle, Ólafur Arnalds, Nils Frahm, Sufjan Stevens, and Jonny Greenwood.

== Related groups ==
Ensembles usually associated with this genre are Bang on a Can All-Stars, Alarm Will Sound, yMusic, Roomful of Teeth, Eighth Blackbird, Now Ensemble, and The Living Earth Show.

== See also ==
- Independent music
- Avant-garde
