= Michael Mizrahi =

Michael Mizrahi is an American pianist who is known for his recordings of contemporary classical works and his performances of works by Bach, Mozart, Beethoven, Schoenberg, and Philip Glass.

== Life and career ==
Michael Mizrahi was born in 1978 in Alexandria, Virginia. He studied piano with Claude Frank and Peter Frankl at the Yale School of Music, and Leon Fleisher at the Ravinia Festival and Carnegie Hall's Professional Training Workshops. He also received training at the University of Virginia, New England Conservatory, and Carnegie Hall's Ensemble Connect.

He has commissioned and made several recordings of contemporary piano works, most notably through albums on the New Amsterdam Records and Sono Luminus labels, and has premiered new works by composers such as Judd Greenstein, Sarah Kirkland Snider, Missy Mazzoli, John Luther Adams, and Mark Dancigers. He is also known for his music videos The Bright Motion and Plan of the City.

Mizrahi is a founding member of NOW Ensemble, a pioneering new music group which formed in New York City in the early 2000s. He has taught at the Lawrence University Conservatory of Music since 2009, where he is the Frank C. Shattuck Professor of Music and Chair of the Keyboard Department. He has also directed Lawrence University's Summer Music Programs since 2023.

== Discography ==
=== Solo albums ===
- The Bright Motion (New Amsterdam Records, 2012)
- Currents (New Amsterdam Records, 2016)
- Dreamspace (Sono Luminus, 2024)

=== With NOW Ensemble ===
- NOW (New Amsterdam Records, 2008)
- Awake (New Amsterdam Records, 2011)
- Song from the Uproar (with Missy Mazzoli and Abigail Fischer) (New Amsterdam Records, 2012)
- Dreamfall (New Amsterdam Records, 2015)
- Rounder Songs (with Emily Pinkerton and Patrick Burke) (New Amsterdam Records, 2018)
- Spare the Rod! (with Yevgeniy Sharlat) (New Amsterdam Records, 2019)
- Before and After (with Sean Friar) (New Amsterdam Records, 2021)
