= Gabriella Smith =

American composer (born 1991)

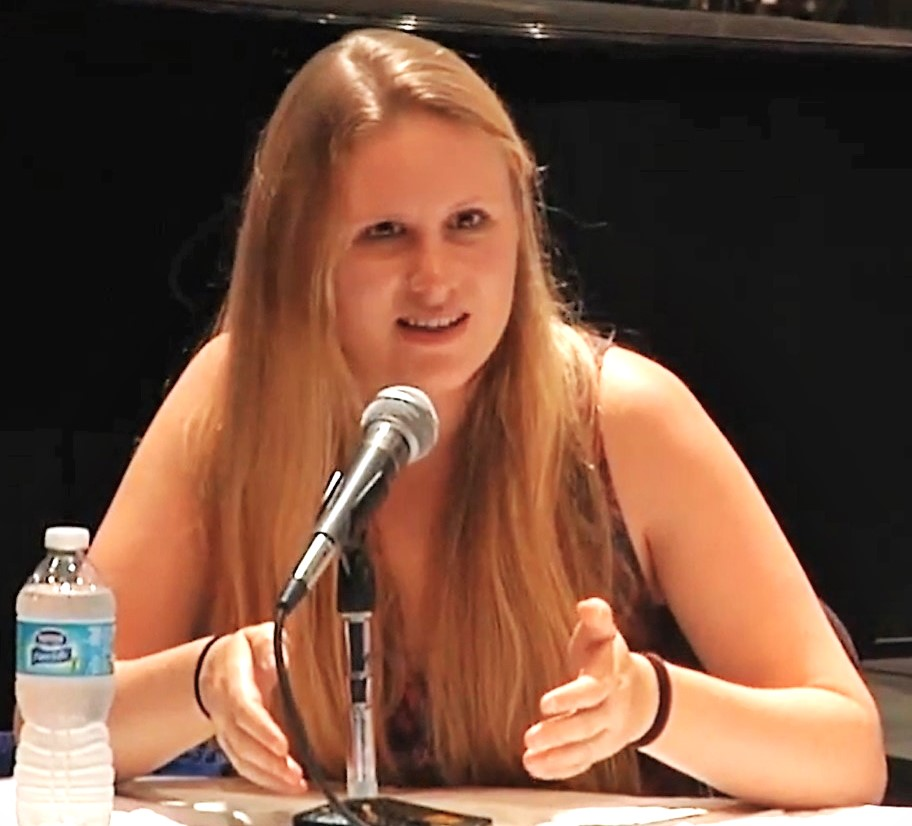
Gabriella Smith at the 2014 Cabrillo Festival of Contemporary Music

Gabriella Smith (born December 26, 1991) is an American composer from Berkeley, California.

== Life ==
Gabriella Smith was born December 26, 1991, in Berkeley, California. As a teenager, she was very interested in biology, ecology, and conservation, and she spent five years volunteering on a songbird research project in Point Reyes, California.

Smith began learning the violin at age seven and began composing soon thereafter. Later, she was mentored by John Adams as a part of his Young Composers Program in Berkeley. She received her Bachelors of Music in composition from the Curtis Institute of Music in Philadelphia in 2013 where she studied with David Ludwig. She attended Princeton University for graduate school and has since been living in Marseille, France; Oslo, Norway; and Seattle, USA.

Smith enjoys hiking, backpacking, birding, and making underwater recordings with a hydrophone.

== Performances ==
Smith's works have been performed by the Los Angeles Philharmonic, San Francisco Symphony, Roomful of Teeth, Eighth Blackbird, Bang on a Can All Stars, the Nashville Symphony, YMusic, Aizuri Quartet, Attacca Quartet, Dover Quartet, Cabrillo Festival Orchestra, PRISM Quartet, Cincinnati Symphony Orchestra, and others.

Her piece Tumblebird Contrails was commissioned by the Pacific Harmony Foundation and premiered in 2014 by the Cabrillo Festival Orchestra, conducted by Marin Alsop. In January 2019, the Los Angeles Philharmonic, conducted by John Adams, performed the piece as part of its centennial season. In 2023, the piece was performed by Royal Stockholm Philharmonic Orchestra and Esa-Pekka Salonen at the Nobel Prize Concert.

Her string quartet Carrot Revolution was written in 2015 for the Aizuri Quartet, having been commissioned by the Barnes Foundation for their exhibition The Order of Things. In November 2019, it was performed by members of the Los Angeles Philharmonic as a part of their Green Umbrella concert series.

The Cincinnati Symphony Orchestra commissioned Gabriella Smith, as part of their 125th Anniversary season, ƒ(x) = sin²x - 1/x. It was first performed in September 2019, conducted by Eun Sun Kim. The Curtis Symphony Orchestra co-commissioned this work, performed on its domestic tour in January–February 2020, culminating in a performance in Carnegie Hall, conducted by Osmo Vänskä

Smith's 2019 composition Bioluminescence Chaconne had its world premiere with the Oregon Symphony in Portland on February 8, 2020.

Her organ concerto Breathing Forests was commissioned by the Los Angeles Philharmonic for organist James McVinnie and premiered in February 2022 by LA Phil and James McVinnie, conducted by Esa-Pekka Salonen.

== Awards ==
Smith has received a BMI Student Composer Award (2018), an ASCAP Leo Kaplan Award (2014), three ASCAP Morton Gould Young Composer Awards, and the Theodore Presser Foundation Music Award (2012). She has also won the 2015 American Modern Ensemble Composition Competition and the 2009 Pacific Musical Society Composition Competition.

== Works ==
=== Orchestral ===
- f(x) = xsin^{2}x+x (2010)
- Circadian Rhythm (2011)
- Tidalwave Kitchen (2012)
- Riprap (2013) for marimba and string orchestra
- Tumblebird Contrails (2014)
- Rust (2016)
- Field Guide (2017)
- Hexacorallia (2018) for string orchestra
- f(x) = sin^{2}x - 1/x (2019)
- Bioluminescence Chaconne (2019)
- One (2021)
- Breathing Forests (2021) concerto for organ and orchestra
- Lost Coast (2023) concerto for cello and orchestra
- Rewilding (2025)
- How To Be A Bird (2025) concerto for violin and orchestra

=== Chamber ===
- Down the Foggy Ruins of Time (2009) for clarinet, violin, cello, and piano
- Kisiabaton (2010) for oboe and string quartet
- Children of the Fire (2012) for oboe, clarinet, violin, viola, and bass
- Spring/Neap (2012) for saxophone quartet
- Brandenburg Interstices (2012) for flute, two violins, viola, cello, bass, and harpsichord
- Gliese 581 (2013) for guitar, clarinet, and cello
- Riprap (2013) for marimba and string quartet or marimba and string orchestra
- Number Nine (2013) for flute, clarinet, violin, cello, percussion, and piano
- Inyo (2013) for string quartet
- the tide is in our veins (2015) for flute, clarinet, electric guitar, bass, and piano
- Forgotten Lullabies (2015) for voice, alto saxophone, violin, cello, drum set, and bass
- Máncora to Huaraz (2015) for piano four-hands
- Carrot Revolution (2015) for string quartet
- Panitao (2016) for clarinet, electric guitar, cello, bass, piano, percussion, and field recording
- Maré (2017) for flute, clarinet, trumpet, violin, viola, and cello
- Loop the Fractal Hold of Rain (2017) for two guitars
- tapin~ 517 / tapout~ (2017) for five violins
- Divertimento (2018) for violin, cello, bass
- Tessellations (2018) for flute, clarinet, trumpet, violin, viola, cello
- Requiem (2018) for 8 voices and string quartet
- Anthozoa (2018) for violin, cello, piano, and percussion
- Divisible (2019) for flute, clarinet, violin, cello, piano, and percussion
- Porcupine Wash (2019) for string quartet

=== Solo ===
- the heaventree of stars hung with humid nightblue fruit (2013) for solo guitar
- Lost Coast Loops (2014) for cello and live-looping electronics
- I heard the summer dust crying to be born (2015) for solo drum set
- Imaginary Pancake (2020) for solo piano
- bare (2020) for solo cello

=== Vocal ===
- Maha (2014) for 16 voices
- Requiem (2018) for 8 voices and string quartet

== Recordings ==
In 2021, her debut album Lost Coast in collaboration with cellist Gabriel Cabezas was released on the Icelandic record label Bedroom Community, produced by violist Nadia Sirota and recorded at Greenhouse Studios in Reykjavík in 2019.

- 2016 PRISM Quartet: The Curtis Project—XAS Records, featuring Spring/Neap
- 2018 Aizuri Quartet: Blueprinting—New Amsterdam Records, featuring Carrot Revolution
- 2018 Duo Noire: Night Triptych—New Focus Recordings, featuring Loop the Fractal Hold of Rain
- 2020 yMusic: Ecstatic Science—New Amsterdam Records, featuring Tessellations and Maré
- 2021 Matt Haimovitz: Primavera I: The Wind, featuring bare
- 2021 Lost Coast—Bedroom Community
