= List of Jewish American composers =

This is a list of Jewish American composers. For listings of Jewish American songwriters, musicals writers, and film composers, see List of Jewish American musicians, which shares some names with this list. For other famous Jewish Americans, see List of Jewish Americans.

- Larry Adler (1914–2001), composer
- Samuel Adler (b. 1928), composer, conductor, educator
- Lera Auerbach (b. 1973), Soviet-born Austrian-American composer
- Milton Babbitt (1916–2011), composer
- Jeanne Behrend (1911–1988), pianist, musicologist, educator, and composer
- Irving Berlin (1888–1989), composer and lyricist
- Lauren Bernofsky (b. 1967), composer
- Leonard Bernstein (1918–1990), composer and conductor
- José Antonio Bowen (b. 1952), jazz musician and president of Goucher College
- Herbert Brün (1918–2000), naturalized American, German-born composer, pioneer of electronic and computer music.
- David Burger composer of choral music, including Tefliah Lishlom Medinat Yisrael
- Aaron Copland (1900–1990), composer and conductor
- Morton Feldman (1926–1987), composer
- George Gershwin (1898–1937), composer and songwriter
- Philip Glass (b. 1937) composer, often associated with Minimalism
- Yossi Green (b. 1955), Hasidic Jewish composer of contemporary Jewish religious music
- Judd Greenstein (b. 1979) composer, often associated with the Indie Classical movement.
- Michael Isaacson (b. 1946) composer of Jewish synagogue music.
- Bronisław Kaper (1902–1983), naturalized American film score composer of Polish-Jewish origin.
- Jerome Kern (1885–1945), composer and songwriter
- Fritz Kreisler (1875–1962), violinist and composer, one of the most famous of his day
- Ezra Laderman (1924–2015) composer, former Dean at the Yale School of Music.
- David Lang (b. 1957) composer, founder of Bang on a Can.
- Leo Ornstein (1893–2002), modernist composer and pianist, Russian-born
- Tobias Picker (b. 1954), American composer, artistic director, and pianist
- Lou Reed (1942–2013), songwriter, composer and guitarist, a member of the Velvet Underground
- Steve Reich (b. 1936) composer, often associated with Minimalism.
- Richard Rodgers (1902–1979), composer, songwriter, lyricist
- Arnold Schoenberg (1874–1951), naturalized American, Austrian-born composer
- Michael Jeffrey Shapiro (b. 1951), composer and conductor
- Nicolas Slonimsky (1894–1995), naturalized American, Russian-born composer, conductor and author
- Stephen Sondheim (1930–2021), composer and lyricist
- Morton Subotnick (b. 1933), composer of electronic and other music, husband to Joan LaBarbara
- Kurt Weill (1900–1950), naturalized American, German-born composer and songwriter, who wrote orchestral music and "show music"
- Maury Yeston (b. 1945), composer and lyricist
- John Zorn (b. 1953), composer and saxophonist
