= Awadagin Pratt =

American pianist (born 1966)

- Born: Awadagin Pratt; March 6, 1966 (age 60)
- Origin: Normal, Illinois, U.S.
- Occupation: Pianist
- Years active: 1998–present

Awadagin Pratt (/ɑːwɑːˈdɑːdʒɪn/; born March 6, 1966) is an American concert pianist born in Pittsburgh, Pennsylvania.

== Life ==
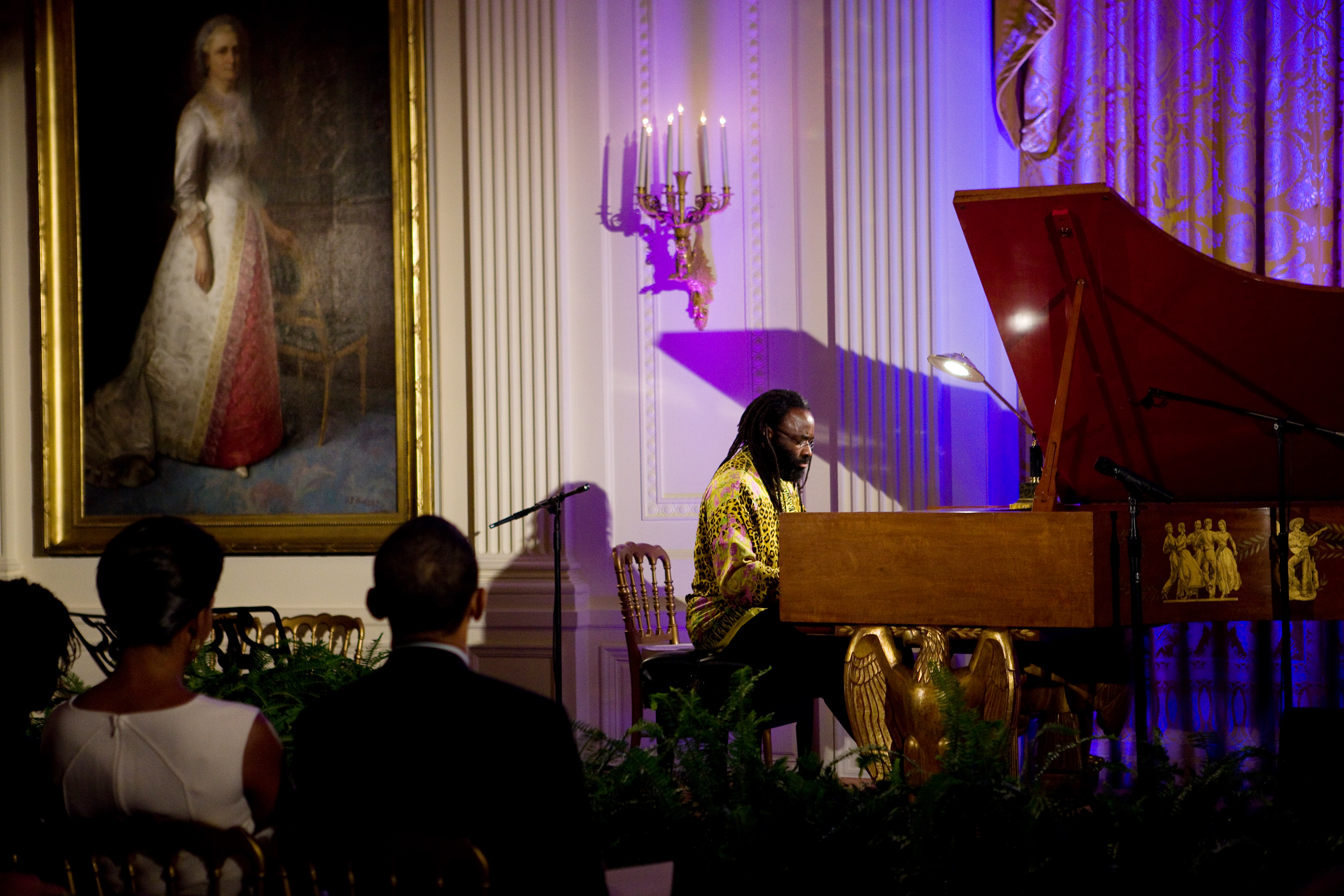
Awadagin Pratt playing in the East Room of the White House, November 2009

Awadagin Pratt began piano lessons at six with Leslie Sompong and after moving to Normal, Illinois, violin lessons at age nine. With a violin scholarship he enrolled in University of Illinois at Urbana-Champaign at the age of 16, then transferred to the Peabody Conservatory of Music in Baltimore where he was the school's first student to receive diplomas in three different performance areas: piano, violin, and conducting.

In 1992 Pratt became the first African-American pianist to win the Naumburg International Piano Competition. Since then, "he has performed with nearly every major orchestra in this country [the United States], at the Clinton White House, Obama White House and on Sesame Street". Winning the Naumburg prize launched Pratt into a strenuous performance schedule, with 40 to 50 concerts that year and 70 the following year, when he signed with the New York City artist management firm IMG Artists. In 1994 Pratt made his debut at Lincoln Center with the New York Philharmonic.

In fall 2004 Pratt accepted a position as Assistant Professor of Piano and Artist in Residence at the University of Cincinnati College-Conservatory of Music, rising to the rank of Professor of Piano. His recital debut there came on December 1, 2005. Pratt joined the San Francisco Conservatory of Music in July 2023. He continues to perform up to 30 times a year across the United States and abroad. A recital on March 3, 2020, drew praises for its "old-master richness." Pratt is also an experienced conductor, having led orchestras in the US and Japan.

== Performance preferences ==
Passacaglia and Fugue in C minor, BWV 582 (11:59)
Pratt performs Johann Sebastian Bach's Passacaglia and Fugue in C minor, BWV 582 on a piano at the White House Evening of Classical Music on November 4, 2009. In addition from 11:22 to 11:27, he salutes United States President Barack Obama with a few bars of "Hail to the Chief".

Passacaglia and Fugue in C minor, BWV 582
Audio only

Piano Trio No. 1 in D minor, Op. 49 – 4. Finale: Allegro assai appassionato (8:08)
Joshua Bell, Pratt, and Alisa Weilerstein perform Felix Mendelssohn's Piano Trio No. 1 in D minor, Op. 49 – 4. Finale: Allegro assai appassionato, at the White House Evening of Classical Music on November 4, 2009.

Piano Trio No. 1 in D minor, Op. 49 – 4. Finale: Allegro assai appassionato
Audio only version

"Fantasia in F minor", 1st and 4th movements
Pratt and student pianist Lucy Hattemer perform Franz Schubert's piano four-hands Fantasia in F minor, 1st and 4th movements at the White House Classical Music Student Workshop Concert. (2009-11-04)

Scriabin: "Étude Op. 8 No. 12"
Pratt performs Alexander Scriabin's Étude Op. 8 No. 12 at the White House Classical Music Student Workshop Concert. (2009-11-04)

Writers often note Pratt's appearance. "Pratt takes the stage at Boston's Jordan Hall in a subtle but colorful green-and-lavender striped and checked shirt. His black pants reveal a dash of whimsicality below the cuffs: socks adorned with a portrait of Van Gogh". Among other composers whose works he has performed are Johann Sebastian Bach, Ludwig van Beethoven, Johannes Brahms, César Franck, Edvard Grieg, Modest Mussorgsky, and Sergei Rachmaninoff.

== Recordings ==
Pratt has released several recordings on compact disc:

- A Long Way From Normal (EMI, 1994), Pratt's debut album, including music of Liszt, Franck, Brahms, and Bach. The title refers to his boyhood home of Normal, Illinois.
- Beethoven Piano Sonatas (EMI, 1995), including sonatas 7, 9, 30, and 31.
- Live From South Africa (EMI, 1997), which was recorded in Cape Town, including works of Bach, Brahms, Franck, and Rachmaninoff.
- Transformations (EMI 72435 56836, November 16, 1999), including Mussorgsky's Pictures at an Exhibition; Pratt's own transcription of Bach's Passacaglia and Fugue in C minor, BWV 582; and Brahms's Variations and Fugue on a Theme by Handel, all played on a Bösendorfer Imperial Grand.
- Play Bach (Angel 2002), including Bach's Brandenburg Concerto no. 5 in D Major, BWV 1050; Keyboard Concerti nos. 4 in A Major, BWV 1055, and 5 in F Minor, BWV 1056; and shorter works, all with a chamber ensemble performing one to a part.
- Stillpoint (New Amsterdam, August 2023) newly commissioned works for piano, strings (A Far Cry), and vocals (Roomful of Teeth). Composers are Jessie Montgomery, Paola Prestini, Alvin Singleton, Pēteris Vasks, Tyshawn Sorey, and Judd Greenstein.
