= Aizuri Quartet =

American string quartet

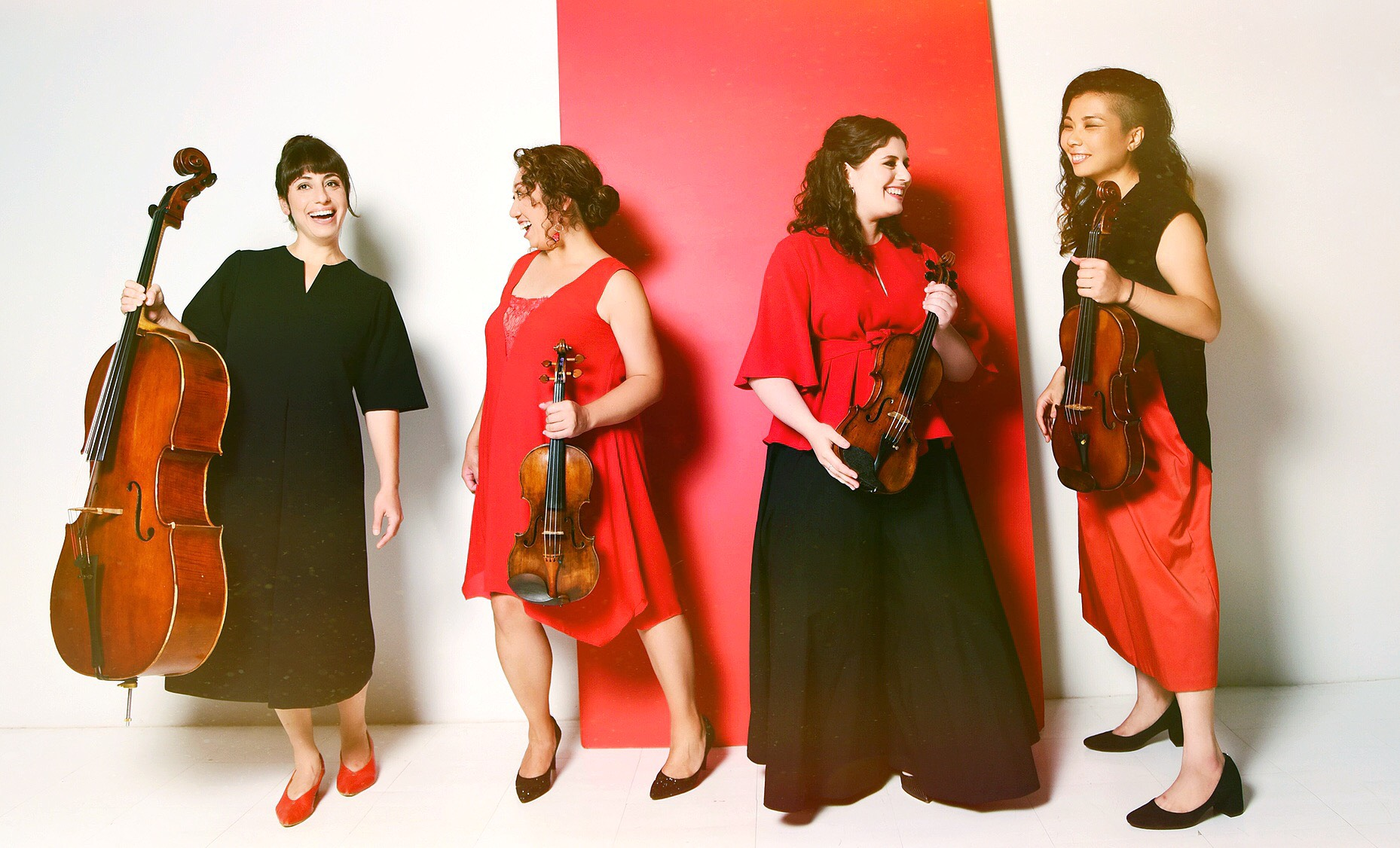

The Aizuri Quartet is an American string quartet formed in 2012. Known for its performance of new music as well as the traditional repertoire, it has served as the quartet-in-residence at a number of cultural organizations, including the Metropolitan Museum of Art, 2017–2018, the Caramoor Center for Music and the Arts, 2015–2016, and the Curtis Institute, 2014–2016. Its name is taken from aizuri-e, a Japanese style of woodblock printing that is mostly blue.

== Members ==
The quartet was founded by Ayane Kozasa, viola, Karen Ouzounian, cello, and Miho Saegusa and Zoe Martin-Doike, violins. Martin-Doike departed in 2015, and was replaced by Arianna Kim. With Kim's departure late in 2019, violinist Emma Frucht joined the ensemble.

== Awards ==
The Aizuri Quartet has been selected to receive the Cleveland Quartet Award for the 2022–23 and 2023–24 seasons.

The Aizuri Quartet was awarded the Grand Prize First Place at the 2018 M-Prize Chamber Arts Competition.

In 2017, the quartet won First Place at the ninth Osaka International Chamber Music Competition and Festa.

Aizuri was also awarded third place at the 2015 Wigmore Hall International String Quartet Competition.

== Commissioned works ==
Works written expressly for the Aizuri Quartet include:

- Lembit Beecher, Sophia's Wide Awake Dreams
- Evan Premo, Deeply Known
- Yevgeniy Sharlat, RIPEFG
- Caroline Shaw, Blueprint
- Gabriella Smith, Carrot Revolution
- Paul Wiancko, Lift

== Recordings ==
Blueprinting, New Amsterdam, 2018; nominated for a Grammy award.

The Bells Bow Down: Chamber Music of Ilari Kaila, Innova, 2020.

Earthdrawn Skies, 2022
