= Mark Doten =

American novelist and librettist

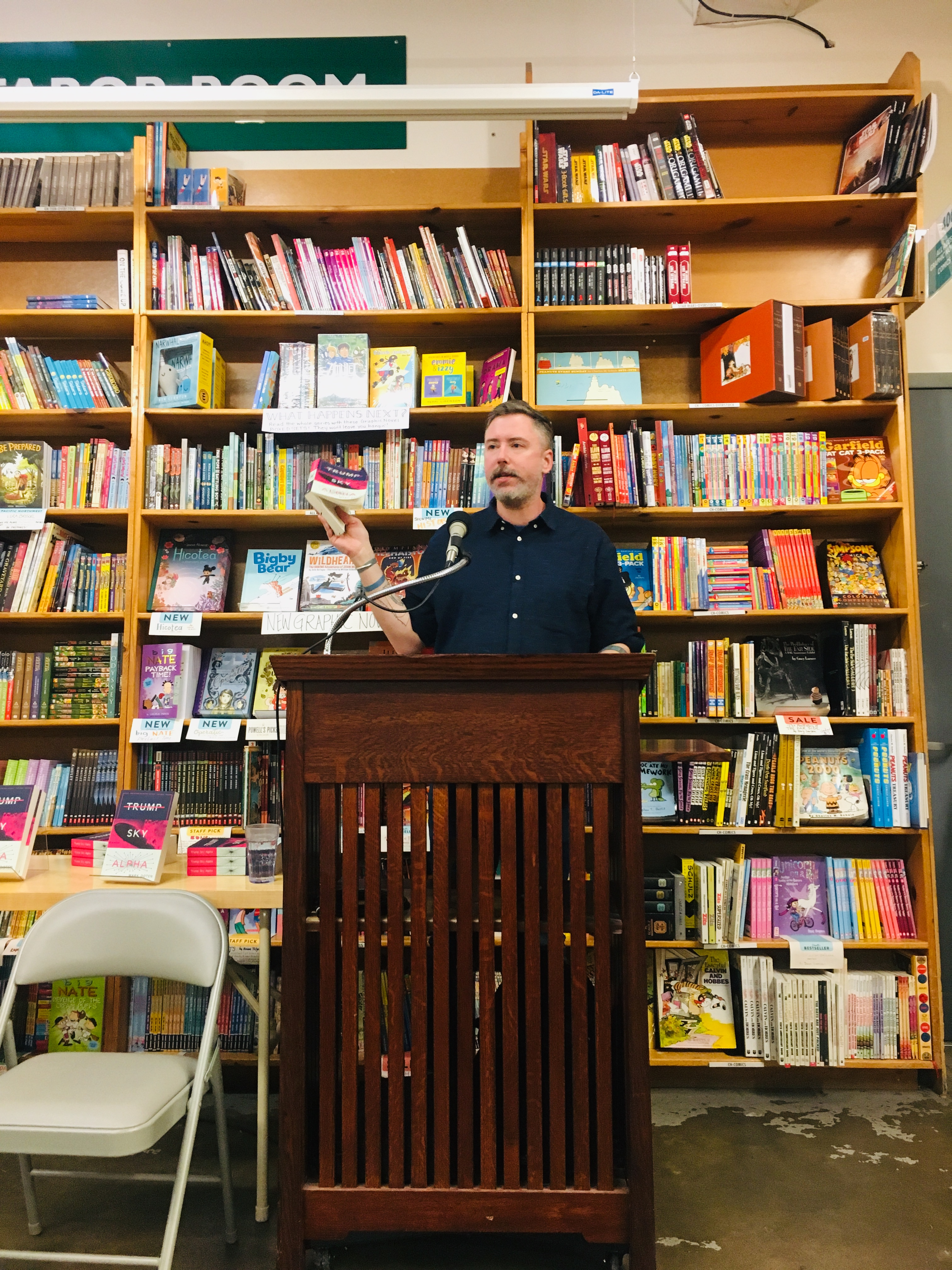
- Born: Minnesota, U.S.
- Education: Columbia University
- Occupations: Novelist, librettist

Mark Doten is an American novelist and librettist. He is the author of two novels, The Infernal and Trump Sky Alpha, both published by Graywolf Press, and he has been a librettist for the Los Angeles Opera and the San Francisco Opera.

The New York Times called Trump Sky Alpha "a funny book and a sad one, a bright one and a dark one, a distant sci-fi dystopia and a ripped-from-the-headlines tragedy. . . The book acts both as a novel and as a searching, tortured position paper on the use of media, message and, especially, satire in our time.” The Los Angeles Times called Doten "one of our keenest and most inventive prose writers working today.”

Granta named Doten one of the best young American novelists in 2017.

== Works ==
- Doten, Mark (2014) (libretto) and Ted Hearne (composer). The Source, an oratorio about Chelsea Manning, sets text from leaked military documents; it premiered at the Brooklyn Academy of Music, and was performed at the Los Angeles Opera and the San Francisco Opera.
- Doten, Mark (2015). The Infernal. Minneapolis, Minnesota: Graywolf Press. ISBN 9781555977016. OCLC 879582832.
- Doten, Mark (2019). Trump Sky Alpha. Minneapolis, Minnesota: Graywolf Press. ISBN 9781555978280. OCLC 1088909814.
- Doten, Mark (2025). Whites: Stories. Graywolf Press. ISBN 9781644452905.
