= Jeffrey Kahane =

American pianist and conductor

- Born: Jeffrey Alan Kahane; September 12, 1956 (age 70); Los Angeles, California, U.S.
- Education: San Francisco Conservatory of Music (BM); University of Colorado Boulder (MA)
- Children: 2, including Gabriel

Jeffrey Alan Kahane (born September 12, 1956) is an American classical concert pianist and conductor. He was music director of the Los Angeles Chamber Orchestra for 20 years, the longest of any music director in the orchestra's history. He is the music director of the Sarasota Music Festival, a program of the Sarasota Orchestra, and a professor of keyboard studies (piano) at the USC Thornton School of Music in Los Angeles, California.

== Early life and education ==
Kahane grew up in West Los Angeles, and began studying piano at age five, and at age 10 began learning to play the guitar. For the next few years, he split his time between his piano studies and playing folk and rock music on the guitar. At age 14, he was accepted as a scholarship pupil by the Polish-born pianist Jakob Gimpel. "I was completely transformed by the contact with him", Kahane said. "There was something that I got from Brahms and Beethoven and Bach that I couldn't live without. And I wanted to make a contribution to keeping it vital and alive."

After his sophomore year of high school, Kahane entered the San Francisco Conservatory of Music. He studied piano and conducting, and graduated in 1977. While in San Francisco, he played keyboard instruments in the San Francisco Symphony, explored jazz, and played in the pit for a touring Broadway musical. Kahane later earned a Master of Arts degree in classics from the University of Colorado Boulder.

== Career ==
At the age of 24, Kahane entered the Van Cliburn International Piano Competition in 1981 and won fourth place. Kahane received additional exposure because PBS broadcast the competition's finals round. Two years later, he won the Grand Prize in the Arthur Rubinstein International Piano Master Competition in Israel.

Kahane made his Carnegie Hall debut in 1983 at an Arthur Rubinstein Tribute Concert, and his London debut in 1985. In 1983 he won an Avery Fisher Career Grant, and in 1987 the first Andrew Wolf Chamber Music Award.

He has made numerous solo appearances in recital and with major orchestras around the world, including New York Philharmonic, Cleveland Orchestra, Los Angeles Philharmonic, Philadelphia Orchestra, San Francisco Symphony, Rotterdam Philharmonic, Israel Philharmonic and the Leipzig Gewandhaus Orchestra. In addition, he has become a favored recital accompanist for Yo-Yo Ma, Dawn Upshaw, Joshua Bell, and Thomas Quasthoff, and he often appears with leading chamber ensembles such as the Emerson String Quartet.

In 1983, he performed with the Naumburg Orchestral Concerts, in the Naumburg Bandshell, Central Park, in the summer series.

In the summer of 2003 Kahane performed all five Beethoven piano concertos with the Los Angeles Chamber Orchestra over two consecutive nights at the Hollywood Bowl. He repeated the cycle at Ravinia with the Chicago Symphony in the summer of 2004.

During the 2005–2006 concert season, he performed all 23 of the Mozart piano concertos as part of the Los Angeles Chamber Orchestra's celebration of the 250th anniversary of the composer's birth.

Kahane made his conducting debut at the Oregon Bach Festival in 1988, conducting a Mozart concerto from the keyboard. He has often returned to the festival as both pianist and conductor.

In 1991, Kahane co-founded the Gardner Chamber Orchestra at the Isabella Stewart Gardner Museum, an ensemble of outstanding students and recent graduates of the major schools of music in the Boston area. He served as artistic director and conductor from 1991 to 1995.

=== Santa Rosa Symphony ===
In 1995, Kahane became music director of the Santa Rosa Symphony. He held the post until the end of the 2005–06 season, after which he was given the title of conductor laureate.

Under Kahane's leadership, the subscriber base increased almost twofold and artistic standards improved. "My tenure with the Santa Rosa Symphony has been the most fulfilling and exciting years of my musical life", Kahane said. "As I move forward, I know that nothing I ever do will mean more to me than the privilege of working with these amazing and dedicated musicians and making music with them for this exceptionally passionate and committed audience."

=== Los Angeles Chamber Orchestra ===
Kahane has been music director of the Los Angeles Chamber Orchestra since 1997, succeeding Iona Brown. In 2008, his contract was extended through the 2011–12 season.

According to critic David Mermelstein:

Kahane's taste in new music doesn't appeal to everyone. Some critics find his idea of "modern" too conservative, and LACO's older subscribers have been known to grumble about even "safe" choices. Of course, pleasing everyone all the time isn't music making; it's pandering. On balance, Kahane does a laudable job of giving concert goers a healthy mix of the familiar and the slightly daring. His ability to land major soloists, however, is beyond reproach. Such celebrated performers as Hilary Hahn, Thomas Quasthoff, Lang Lang, Lorraine Hunt Lieberson, and Daniel Hope have appeared with LACO in recent years, and next season promises first appearances by Cho-Liang Lin and Peter Serkin. But Kahane's achievement at LACO has nothing to do with enriching the musical canon or lassoing big names. It is instead the story of a modest musician who through patience and perhaps a little guile restored dignity to a group of dispirited players. He made them feel their music making mattered, and now others do, too. "We're certainly not the only place in America where musicians are happy", says the conductor, "but the combination of that attitude with this level of playing is very rare."

In April 2014, Kahane announced that he would step down after the 2016–17 season, after which will officially assume the title of music director laureate.. His twenty-year-long tenure will be the longest of any music director in the orchestra's history

=== Colorado Symphony ===
Kahane became music director of the Colorado Symphony Orchestra in 2005. His initial contract was for three years. In 2008, Kahane extended his Colorado Symphony contract through 2012. However, in July 2008, Kahane announced his resignation from the orchestra at the end of the 2009–10 season. Kahane said that severe hypertension in 2007, which caused him to cancel several weeks of concerts in both Colorado and Los Angeles, led to his decision to concentrate more on his solo piano career:

I had a real scare. That forced me to really stop and take a look at my life and say, "You know what? You can't do everything." I don't think I underestimated the job. I think I overestimated myself, not in my abilities but just being in a body and turning 50."

According to The Denver Post, Kahane's tenure "has been marked by increased audiences and an uncommonly strong bond with the orchestra's musicians."

=== Sarasota Music Festival ===
In 2016, Kahane was appointed music director of the Sarasota Music Festival, a program of Sarasota Orchestra. In his tenure as music director, Kahane plans "to preserve all the great things about it and experiment and tweak things here and there." Under Kahane's direction, the festival has featured the ensemble yMusic, as well as premieres of commissioned works by composers Robert Sirota and Andrea Clearfield. Kahane has plans to incorporate music by more female and young composers in future Festivals, in addition to offering a wider range of repertoire and commissioning more new works.

=== San Antonio Philharmonic ===
In 2024, Kahane was appointed to be the first music director of the San Antonio Philharmonic.

On February 9th, 2026, Kahane resigned from his post as music director.

=== Harmonium of Texas ===
In May 2026, Kahane announced the formation of Harmonium of Texas, a professional orchestra in San Antonio slated to begin performances in October 2026. Kahane will serve as Harmonium's artistic director.

=== Educational activities ===
Kahane founded the Los Angeles Chamber Orchestra's Family Concert series, and he is personally involved in the orchestra's Meet the Music program, which serves approximately 2,700 Los Angeles elementary school students annually.

"The thing I myself am most proud of," Kahane said in 2004, "is that in the nine years that I've been music director between the two orchestras [Los Angeles and Santa Rosa], with two exceptions, I have conducted every single children's concert, youth concert, family concert and neighborhood concert that either of those two orchestras has done."

== Personal life ==
Kahane and his wife, Martha, a psychologist in private practice and an avid choral singer, live in Los Angeles. They have two adult children: Gabriel Kahane, a composer, pianist, and singer living in Brooklyn; and Annie, a choreographer and poet.

== Awards and recognition ==
- Fourth Place: Van Cliburn International Piano Competition, 1981
- Grand Prize: Arthur Rubinstein International Piano Competition, 1983
- Avery Fisher Career Grant, 1983
- The first Andrew Wolf Chamber Music Award, 1987
- In 2002, League of American Orchestras MetLife Award for Excellence in Community Engagement, for educational projects with the Santa Rosa Symphony
- Doctor of Fine Arts (honorary degree), Sonoma State University, 2005
- Under Kahane's leadership, both the Los Angeles Chamber Orchestra and Colorado Symphony Orchestra received 2007 ASCAP Awards for Adventurous Programming. It was the third time in four years that LACO had received the award.

== Recordings ==
- PENTATONE OXINGALE SERIES "Tippet Rise Opus 2017". Matt Haimovitz, Anne-Marie McDermott, Yevgeny Sudbin, Andrea Lam, Jessica Sindell, Caroline Goulding, David Fung, Vicky Chow, Doug Perkins. PENTATONE PTC 5186736 (2018).
- Bach: Concerto for violin, strings & continuo No. 2 in E major, BWV 1042, Hilary Hahn (violin), Los Angeles Chamber Orchestra, Jeffrey Kahane (conductor); Deutsche Grammophon
- Bach: Concerto for 2 violins, strings & continuo in D minor ("Double"), BWV 1043, Hilary Hahn (violin), Margaret Batjer (violin), Los Angeles Chamber Orchestra, Jeffrey Kahane (conductor); Deutsche Grammophon
- Bach: Concerto for violin, strings & continuo No. 1 in A minor, BWV 1041, Hilary Hahn (violin), Los Angeles Chamber Orchestra, Jeffrey Kahane (conductor); Deutsche Grammophon
- Bach: Concerto for oboe & violin (or 2 violins), strings & continuo in D minor (reconstruction), BWV 1060R, Hilary Hahn (violin), Allan Vogel (oboe), Los Angeles Chamber Orchestra, Jeffrey Kahane (conductor); Deutsche Grammophon
- Bach: Partita for Keyboard No. 4 in D, BWV828, Jeffrey Kahane (piano); Nonesuch
- Bach: Three-part Inventions (Sinfonia) for Keyboard BWV787-801, Jeffrey Kahane (piano); Nonesuch
- Bach: Brandenburg Concertos Nos. 1-6, BWV 1046-1051, Oregon Bach Festival Orchestra, Helmuth Rilling (conductor), Jeffrey Kahane (harpsichord); Hänssler Verlag
- Bach: Harpsichord Concertos, BWV 1060-1062, 1061a, Jeffrey Kahane (harpsichord), Robert Levin (harpsichord), Oregon Bach Festival Chamber Orchestra, Helmuth Rilling (conductor); Hänssler Verlag
- Bernstein: Sonata for clarinet & piano, Yo-Yo Ma (cello), Jeffrey Kahane (piano); Sony Classical
- Bernstein: Symphony No. 2 for Piano and Orchestra, Age of Anxiety, Jeffrey Kahane (piano), Bournemouth Symphony, Andrew Litton (conductor); Virgin/EMI Classics
- Gershwin: Preludes (3) for Piano, Yo-Yo Ma (cello), Jeffrey Kahane (piano); Sony Classical
- Rorem: From an Unknown Past, Brian Asawa (counter-tenor), Los Angeles Chamber Orchestra, Jeffrey Kahane (conductor); BMG/RCA Victor Red Seal
- Rorem: More Than a Day, song cycle for counter-tenor and orchestra, Brian Asawa (counter-tenor), Los Angeles Chamber Orchestra, Jeffrey Kahane (conductor); BMG/RCA Victor Red Seal
- Rorem: Water Music, for violin, clarinet & orchestra, Margaret Batjer (violin), Gary Grey (clarinet), Los Angeles Chamber Orchestra, Jeffrey Kahane (conductor); BMG/RCA Victor Red Seal
- Schoenfield: Four Parables for Piano & Orchestra, Jeffrey Kahane (piano), New World Symphony, John Nelson (conductor); Argo/Decca
- Schubert: Complete Works for Violin and Piano, Joseph Swensen (violin), Jeffrey Kahane (piano); BMG/RCA Victor Red Seal
- Richard Strauss: Burleske in D minor, Jeffrey Kahane (piano), Eugene Espino (timpani), Cincinnati Symphony, Jesús López-Cobos (conductor); Telarc
