= Ted Hearne =

American composer, singer and conductor

- Born: Edward Hearne; 1982 (age 43–44); Chicago, Illinois
- Genres: Contemporary classical, Avant-garde music, Experimental
- Occupations: Composer, Conductor, Vocalist
- Instrument: Vocalist
- Years active: 2000–present
- Labels: New Amsterdam Records, New Focus Recordings
- Website: www.tedhearne.com

Ted Hearne (born 1982) is an American composer, singer and conductor. He currently lives in Los Angeles, California.

== Biography ==
Ted Hearne was born and raised in Chicago, Illinois, where he was a member of the Chicago Children's Choir and graduate of Whitney M. Young Magnet High School. He moved to New York in 2000 and has attended the Manhattan School of Music and Yale School of Music. Hearne's oratorio “Katrina Ballads”, an hour-long work about the media’s response to Hurricane Katrina received widespread acclaim after it was premiered at Charleston's Spoleto Festival in 2007. His oratorio The Source, about Chelsea Manning, sets text from leaked military documents and was premiered at the Brooklyn Academy of Music. His third oratorio Place, written in collaboration with Saul Williams and the director Patricia McGregor, was premiered digitally in 2020 as Place: Quarantine Edition. The album version of Place was also released in 2020 and was nominated for two Grammy Awards.

Hearne has been commissioned by the Los Angeles Philharmonic, San Francisco Symphony, A Far Cry, pianist Timo Andres, singer-songwriter Gabriel Kahane and other musicians. Hearne has become known for writing in a wide range of contemporary-music styles, and has collaborated with a diverse group of musicians, most notably Erykah Badu, with whom he created an evening-length piece for Badu to perform with the Brooklyn Philharmonic, J.G. Thirlwell, with whom he created chamber-music arrangements of Thirlwell's electronic project Manorexia, and electronic/noise musician Philip White, with whom he performs as R We Who R We. Hearne has also worked with jazz musician Rene Marie, poet Dorothea Lasky, the JACK Quartet, harpist/composer Zeena Parkins and conductor Alan Pierson, and his music has been performed at the Brooklyn Academy of Music (BAM), (Le) Poisson Rouge, Amsterdam’s Muziekgebouw, and Carnegie Hall.

Hearne is the recipient of the 2009 Gaudeamus Prize in Music Composition, and the 2014 New Voices Residency from publisher Boosey and Hawkes and the San Francisco Symphony. In 2018 and in 2021, he was a finalist for the Pulitzer Prize in music. He is currently on the Composition faculty at the USC Thornton School of Music.

== Concert works ==
Hearne's music is known for juxtaposing diverse styles, and for its often overtly political content. The New York Times has noted Hearne for his “topical, politically sharp-edged works,” and has called his compositional style “nuanced, elliptical and elusive.”

Oratorio

- 2008 “Katrina Ballads” for mixed chamber ensemble and five singers
- 2014 “The Source” for mixed chamber ensemble and four singers
- 2020 "Place" for mixed chamber ensemble and six singers

Large Ensemble

- 2008 “Patriot” for orchestra
- 2010 “Is It Dirty” for two singers and chamber orchestra
- 2010 “Build a Room” for trumpet and orchestra
- 2011 “Partition” for chorus and orchestra
- 2011 “Word for Word” for orchestra
- 2012 “Law of Mosaics” for string orchestra
- 2013 "Stem” for orchestra
- 2013 “You’re Causing Quite A Disturbance” for orchestra and singer (with Erykah Badu)
- 2015 "Respirator" for chamber orchestra
- 2015 "Dispatches" for orchestra
- 2017 "Miami in Movements" for orchestra with video
- 2018 "Brass Tacks" for symphonic orchestra
- 2019 "In Thrall" for wind ensemble

Solo Music

- 2010 “Nobody’s” for solo violin or viola
- 2011 “Parlor Diplomacy” for solo piano
- 2016 "DaVZ23BzMH0" for solo cello with electronics
- 2020 "Distance Canon" for solo violin
- 2020 "The Luminous Road" for solo piccolo

Chamber music

- 2004 “Once the Search” for viola, voice, percussion and piano
- 2005 “One of us, One of them” for piano and percussion
- 2007 “Cordavi and Fig” for 13 instruments
- 2008 “Vessels” for violin, viola and piano
- 2008 “Snowball” for 8 instruments
- 2009 “Thaw” for percussion quartet
- 2011 “Candy” for electric guitar quartet
- 2011 “Cutest Little Arbitrage” for 2 saxophones, trombone and rhythm section
- 2012 “Crispy Gentlemen” for flute, bass clarinet, violin, viola, cello, piano and percussion
- 2014 "'The Cage' Variations" for flute, clarinet, violin, cello, piano, percussion, and solo baritone
- 2014 “Furtive Movements” for cello and percussion
- 2014 "By-By Huey" for flute, bass clarinet, violin, cello, piano, and percussion
- 2016 "The Answer to the Question That Wings Ask" for string quartet with narrator
- 2016 "Baby [an argument]" for 10 instruments
- 2016 "For the Love of Charles Mingus" for six violins
- 2016 "One Like" for 14 instruments
- 2017 "To Be the Thing" for voice, electric guitar, and percussion with live electronics
- 2017 "Exposure" for string quartet
- 2019 "Time is forever dividing itself toward innumerable futures [Speed is Pure]" for 4 horns, electric guitar, and voice with live electronics
- 2019 "Authority" for 10 instruments

Choral/Vocal

- 2006 “Warning Song” for voice and cello
- 2007 “I Remember” for three sopranos
- 2008 “Mass for St. Mary’s” for mixed chorus
- 2010 “Intimacy and Resistance” for voice and piano
- 2010 “Protection” for voice and piano
- 2010 “Privilege” for mixed chorus
- 2012 “Ripple” for mixed chorus
- 2014 “Consent” for 16 singers
- 2014 “Sound From the Bench” for mixed chorus, two electric guitars and percussion
- 2015 “Coloring Book” for vocal octet (with Roomful of Teeth)
- 2016 "What it Might Say" for mixed chorus
- 2018 "Fervor" for mixed chorus
- 2018 "Animals" for mixed chorus
- 2019 "Texting With Your Dad in the Anthropocene" for men's chorus
- 2019 "In Your Mouth" for voice and piano or voice and ensemble
- 2020 "The Definition of Crisis" for youth chorus

== Performer and conductor ==
Hearne has performed as a vocalist in several of his own projects, including Katrina Ballads and R WE WHO R WE, and has also performed in works by other contemporary composers. He played the role of Justin Timberlake in Jacob Cooper's opera Timberbrit, and performed at the Ecstatic Music Festival as part of Timo Andres’s Work Songs. Time Out Chicago has called Hearne a "vocal hellion." He is known for his extreme range and for mixing vocal techniques from different styles, including abrupt register changes, rapid speaking, screaming, rapping, falsetto and crooning.

Hearne is an active conductor of contemporary music. He has worked as a conductor with many ensembles in New York, including the Red Light Ensemble, Bang on a Can, Wet Ink Ensemble, Ne(x)tworks and the International Contemporary Ensemble.

== Awards ==
- 2009 Gaudeamus Prize
- 2009 and 2013 Charles Ives Prize
- 2009 and 2012 Morton Gould Young Composer Award
- 2013 Music Alive Residency Award
- 2014 New Voices Residency for Composers

== Recordings ==
- 2010 – Katrina Ballads (New Amsterdam)
- 2010 – J. G. Thirwell: Manorexia: 'The Mesopelagic Wars' (Tzadik)
- 2013 – R WE WHO R WE (New Focus) with Philip White
- 2014 – The Law of Mosaics (Crier) with Andrew Norman and Far Cry
- 2015 – The Source (New Amsterdam)
- 2016 – Outlanders (New Amsterdam)
- 2017 – Sound from the Bench (Cantaloupe Music)
- 2019 – Hazy Heart Pump (New Focus)
- 2020 – Place (New Amsterdam)
- 2025 – Farming (Deathbomb Arc)
