= The Source (oratorio) =

- Oratorio by Ted Hearne
- Librettist: Mark Doten
- Language: English
- Premiere: October 2014; Brooklyn Academy of Music

The Source is an oratorio by American composer Ted Hearne, with libretto by Mark Doten. The work concerns the WikiLeaks disclosures of United States Army soldier Chelsea Manning.

The libretto for The Source is drawn from document disclosures as well as instant messages and interviews, including messages sent from Manning to former hacker Adrian Lamo. The piece features four singers embedded in the audience, a seven-piece musical ensemble, and four video screens. The voices of the singers are at times electronically modified with Auto-Tune. The video screens show the faces of people looking at something, which is revealed at the end to be footage from the "Collateral Murder" video of the July 12, 2007, Baghdad airstrike, in which civilians were killed.

The Source was commissioned by Beth Morrison Projects, who also produced the work's premiere at the Brooklyn Academy of Music in October 2014, directed by Daniel Fish. The New York Times listed the work as one of the best classical vocal performances of 2014. According to the composer, Chelsea Manning has heard the piece (played for her over the phone by her supporters while she was imprisoned), and liked it.

The Los Angeles Opera staged the West Coast premiere of The Source in October 2016. The West Coast tour continued with a run at the San Francisco Opera beginning in February 2017.
