= William Brittelle =

American composer (born 1977)

William Brittelle (born 1977) is a Grammy-winning Brooklyn-based composer, producer, and creator of hypertext and multimedia. He primarily works in the area of genre-fluid electro-acoustic music. Brittelle is co-founder/co-artistic director of New Amsterdam Records with composers Sarah Kirkland Snider and Judd Greenstein and house producer at Shahzad Ismaily's Figureight Recording studio. He has worked with artists across the stylistic spectrum, including the Los Angeles Philharmonic, the Seattle Symphony, the Baltimore Symphony, Roomful of Teeth, Justin Vernon (Bon Iver), Bryce Dessner (The National), Dirty Projectors, Son Lux, Oneohtrix Point Never, Duran Duran, Wye Oak, Kanye West, and others.

== Early life and education ==
Brittelle was raised in rural North Carolina in a conservative Christian environment, an experience that later influenced his 2019 album Spiritual America. Though a trained composer and orchestrator, he has often expressed frustration and dissolution with the world of academia and the classical music industry in general. After being enrolled in a D.M.A. program at the Graduate Center of the City University of New York for a period of two years, Brittelle dropped out and re-enrolled privately with his primary teacher, Pulitzer Prize-winning composer David Del Tredici. In addition to Del Tredici, Brittelle's musical mentors have included Mike Longo (longtime pianist/arranger for Dizzy Gillespie), and punk guitarist Richard Lloyd of Television, with whom Brittelle briefly toured.

During this time, Brittelle played in a number of post-punk and experimental bands and worked as booker for Sin-e, a heralded New York City music venue on the Lower East Side of Manhattan. However, during an afterparty for The Fall at the Knitting Factory, he severely injured his voice and could not talk for ore than six months. During this time, he returned to composition, armed with the desire to incorporate disparate and oppositional influences into one vision. Brittelle has stated that his first album "Mohair Time Warp" written in the wake of his vocal injury, is the first example of work that represented the full breadth of his musical vision. The project featured Brittelle performatively lip-syncing to his own pre-recorded vocals while backed by an electro-acoustic chamber ensemble as he still suffered from vocal dysphonia upon the album's completion.

== Career ==
His work has been praised on NPR's All Things Considered and in many other major outlets, including The New York Times (Sunday Arts & Leisure), The Nation, the Los Angeles Times. The New Yorker labeled Brittelle as "a mercurial artist whose oeuvre embraces post-punk flamboyance, chamber music elegance, and much more." Classical TV has stated: "William Brittelle is creating a body of work that has no precedent, and marks him as one of the most promising heirs of the vital American maverick tradition." Amid the Minotaurs, a piece commissioned and premiered by vocal ensemble Roomful of Teeth, was featured on the group's Grammy-winning debut album. He later received a Grammy award for producing Roomful of Teeth's 2023 album Rough Magic, and a nomination for composing "Psychedelics", from the same record.

Brittelle's discography includes Loving the Chambered Nautilus, a series of electro-acoustic chamber music pieces melding classic synthesizer sounds and drum programming with virtuosic and textured classical composition written for ACME (the American Contemporary Music Ensemble). The album was featured by NPR's All Things Considered, and Nautilus hit #1 on Amazon's Chamber Music Chart. The New York Times labeled the work "bright and joyous", and MUSO dubbed it "a fast, fun, freedom-fueled flurry of a record."

Previous to Nautilus, Brittelle released Television Landscape, his fully composed, post-apocalyptic art rock concept album scored for orchestra, rock band, synths, and children's choir. Dubbed "irresistible" by The New York Times and "a glorious reclamation of lush sounds crusty critics have vilified for years" by Time Out New York, Television Landscape drew substantial praise from both rock and classical critics, leading the Los Angeles Times to say: "You might wonder if Jane’s Addiction had discovered the soul of Debussy."

Brittelle's compositions have been presented at venues across the world, including the Hollywood Bowl in Los Angeles, the Kennedy Center, Teatro Colón in Buenos Aires, the Metropolitan Museum of Art and Lincoln Center in New York. Notable commissions include Love Letter for Arca, piece for synthesizer and orchestra, and Obituary Birthday, a requiem for Kurt Cobain, with the Seattle Symphony, Oh Albert: An LSD Oratorio for the Basel Sinfonietta, and Si Otsedoha commissioned by the Eastern Band of the Cherokee in collaboration with the North Carolina Symphony.

Since 2014, Brittelle has also worked as an arranger and music director. Projects he arranged and/or music directed include Triptych: Eyes of One Another by Bryce Dessner, Mary (An Opera) by Kanye West, Replica (Live) by Oneohtrix Point Never, Prince (A Reimagining) featuring Justin Vernon, Ariel Engel, Jon Hopkins, and others, and Song of the Earth for Dirty Projectors and the Los Angeles Philharmonic (re-orchestration).

Brittelle began producing for other artists in the late 2010s after producing his own albums and overseeing the development of the New Amsterdam catalog. He has since produced records for Julia Holter/Spektral Quartet, OWLS, keyboardist Erika Dohi, Roomful of Teeth, Wye Oak, and composer Ted Hearne, among others. He prefers collaborative studio environments that lean heavily on talented guest musicians and eschews computer effects for vintage outboard gear. He primarily works out of Figureight Recordings in Prospect Heights, Brooklyn – a bespoke unmarked studio owned by the legendary musical polymath Shahzad Ismaily.

During the coronavirus pandemic, Brittelle launched an alternate reality project entitled Eternal September (formerly known as the Meta Simulacrum). Vol. 1, a 90-minute opening tour film commissioned by the Cincinnati Symphony, the Walker Art Center, and the Great Northern Festival, was premiered digitally on May 2, 2021. The project has since expanded dramatically in size and become Brittelle's primary creative outlet.

Brittelle briefly served on the faculty of The New School in New York City, establishing the world's first Genre-fluid Minor in music degree, and is currently a member of the Artistic Innovators Collective at Brown University.
