= Estelí Gomez =

American singer

- Born: December 28, 1985 (age 40)
- Genres: Contemporary classical music, Classical music, Baroque music, Early music, a cappella
- Occupations: Musician; singer
- Instruments: Vocals, piano
- Years active: 2011–present
- Website: esteligomez.com

Estelí Gomez (born December 28, 1985) is an American singer. She is a multiple Grammy Award winning musician.

In addition to her solo touring and recording career, Gomez is a founding member of Roomful of Teeth, recipients of the 2014 Grammy for "Best Chamber Music/Small Ensemble Performance", and they also performed at the 2015 ceremony. Roomful of Teeth was nominated again in 2016 for the album, Render.

Gomez received her second Grammy in 2017 for collaborating on the opening track of Yo-Yo Ma and the Silk Road Ensemble's Sing Me Home, which won in the category of "Best World Music Album" along with fellow Roomful of Teeth members Caroline Shaw, Cameron Beauchamp and Virginia Warnken Kelsey. She received her third Grammy for "Best Chamber Music/Small Ensemble Performance" in 2024 for her collaboration on Roomful of Teeth's record Rough Magic.

== Biography ==
Gomez was born in Watsonville, California. She received her undergraduate degree from Yale, and a masters from McGill, where she studied with Sanford Sylvan.

She first gained international acclaim in 2011 when she received first prize in the Canticum Gaudium International Early Music Vocal Competition in Poznań, Poland.

She has been praised for her "clear, bright voice" in The New York Times, and for an "artistry that belies her young years" in the Kansas City Metropolis, and has been a featured performer at the Kennedy Center, the University of Oregon's Music Today Festival, and many other venues and festivals around the world.

In 2017, she was the featured soloist for the Seattle Symphony's recording of Nielsen: Symphony No 3, Symphony No 4, and toured with Conspirare as a part of its new major work, Considering Matthew Shepard, for the 2017/2018 season. In February 2018, she returned to Carnegie Hall, performing songs by Philip Glass and arranged by Nico Muhly.

In 2019, Gomez joined the faculty of Lawrence University in Appleton, Wisconsin, as an Assistant Professor of Voice.

In 2024, Gomez co-edited the book Historical Performance and New Music: Aesthetics and Practices and co-wrote the chapter "Feeding the Flexible Omnivore: Collaborative Systems in A Far Cry and Roomful of Teeth".
