= Sean Friar =

American composer and pianist (b. 1985)

- Born: 1985 (age 40–41); Los Angeles, CA
- Genres: Contemporary classical, Avant-garde music, Experimental
- Occupation: Composer
- Instrument: Pianist
- Years active: 2000-present
- Labels: New Amsterdam, Innova Recordings
- Website: www.seanfriar.com

Sean Friar (born 1985 in Los Angeles, California) is an American composer and pianist. He currently lives in Denver, Colorado.

== Biography ==
Friar was born and raised in Los Angeles. He studied Music Composition and Psychology at UCLA where he graduated in 2007. He continued his studies at Princeton University, where he received an M.F.A. and Ph.D. in Composition. His primary teachers were Paul Chihara, Paul Lansky, Steven Mackey, and Dmitri Tymoczko.

Friar has been commissioned by the Los Angeles Philharmonic, Ensemble Modern, New World Symphony, Alarm Will Sound, American Composers Orchestra, NOW Ensemble, the Cabrillo Festival of Contemporary Music, Present Music, and the Scharoun Ensemble of the Berlin Philharmonic. Other performers of his music include So Percussion, Ensemble Klang, Crash Ensemble, Psappha New Music Ensemble, Alter Ego, Ensemble Argento, and many others.

Friar is the recipient of the 2011 Rome Prize in Music Composition. He serves as the chair of the composition department at the Lamont School of Music at the University of Denver and was previously on the Music Composition faculty at the USC Thornton School of Music.

== Concert Works ==
Friar's music is known for its propulsive energy, adventurous orchestration, and sense of humor.

Wind Ensemble

- 2017 "Dynamics" for solo cello and chamber winds.
- 2023 "Bassoon Concerto" for solo bassoon and wind ensemble.
- 2025 "Renew" for wind ensemble.

Orchestra/Large Ensemble

- 2009 "Out of Line" for chamber orchestra
- 2011 "Clunker Concerto" for percussion quartet on junk car parts and chamber orchestra
- 2013 "Noise Gate" for orchestra
- 2013 "In the Blue" for sinfonietta
- 2015 "Finding Time" for sinfonietta
- 2019 "Emerald Oasis" for orchestra

Solo Music

- 2010 "Teaser" for solo cello
- 2010 "Oboemobo" for solo oboe and effects pedals
- 2012 "Wind-up Etude" for solo piano
- 2016 "Chrysalis" for soloist on piano and percussion
- 2018 "Elastic Loops" for solo piano (composed 2007, revised 2018)
- 2023 "Two Solitudes" for solo piano (composed 2012, revised 2023)

Chamber Music

- 2006 "Hell-Bent" for violin, cello, and piano
- 2008 "Little Green Pop" for two saxophones, trombone, electric guitar, piano, percussion, and sound engineer
- 2008 "String Quartet"
- 2009 "Velvet Hammer" for flute, clarinet, electric guitar, piano, and bass
- 2009 "Scale 9" for clarinet, violin, cello, piano, and percussion (also versions with flute and viola)
- 2010 "Fighting Words" for soprano, clarinet, electric guitar, violin, cello, percussion, drum kit, and piano
- 2010 "Short Winds" for woodwind quintet (alternate version for saxophone quartet)
- 2012 "One-Way Trip" for clarinet, horn, two violins, viola, cello, bass, and piano
- 2012 "Mezereon" for English horn and prepared piano
- 2013 "Breaking Point" for clarinet, trumpet, electric guitar, two violins, viola, cello, bass, percussion, and piano
- 2014 "Two Solitudes" for flute, viola, and harp
- 2014 "Four Streets" for percussion quartet
- 2015 "Shades" for alto sax and piano
- 2015 "Mezereon" for alto sax and piano
- 2016 "Kindly Reply" for brass quintet
- 2016 "Come Again" for two pianos
- 2020 "Before and After" for flute, clarinet, electric guitar, piano, and bass
- 2020 "Fit" for two digital pianos with dynamic microtonal pitch-mapping (using Pianoteq software)
- 2022 "Impulse Control" for two clarinets and piano.
- 2023 "String Quartet 2: Memoriam"

Electronic

- 2008 "Boomdinger" for percussion quartet and laptop orchestra. (Collaboration with composer, Cameron Britt.)

== Awards ==
- 2007, 2008, 2009, 2011 Morton Gould Young Composer Award
- 2008 Lee Ettelson Award
- 2009 Aaron Copland House Residency
- 2011 Rome Prize
- 2011 Finalist for Gaudeamus Prize
- 2012 Charles Ives Prize
- 2012 Chamber Music America Classical Commissioning Grant
- 2013 Fromm Foundation Commission

== Recordings ==
- 2011 – "Velvet Hammer" with NOW Ensemble on "Awake" (New Amsterdam Records)
- 2012 – "Short Winds" with Madera Quintet on "Five at Play" (Crescent Phase Recordings)
- 2012 – "Teaser" with Mariel Roberts on "nonextraneous sounds" (Innova Recordings)
- 2018 – "Kindly Reply" with the Brass Project on "Cityscaping"
- 2021 – "Elastic Loops" with Matthew McCright on "Endurance" (Vox Novus)
- 2021 – "Before and After" with NOW Ensemble on "Before and After" (New Amsterdam Records)
