= Daniel Wohl =

French-American composer

Daniel Wohl (born September 6, 1980) is a Paris, France born composer based in Los Angeles, California, known for his use of both electronic and acoustic instruments.

== Education ==
Wohl holds degrees in composition from Bard College, University of Michigan and the Yale School of Music. His teachers include composers David Lang, Martin Bresnick, Joan Tower, Bright Sheng, Ingram Marshall, William Bolcom and Aaron Jay Kernis.

Daniel Wohl
- Born: September 6, 1980 (age 46); Paris, France
- Genres: contemporary classical, electronic
- Occupation: composer
- Labels: New Amsterdam Records, Nonesuch

== Career ==
His music has been programmed by contemporary classical ensembles such as So Percussion, the London Contemporary Orchestra, the Los Angeles Philharmonic, The Chicago Symphony Orchestra the Calder Quartet, Eighth Blackbird, and the American Symphony Orchestra in a variety of settings including Carnegie Hall, The Broad, the Hollywood Bowl, MoMA PS1, Le Poisson Rouge, the Dia Beacon, and Mass MoCA. He has also collaborated with electronic artists including Laurel Halo, Julia Holter, and Son Lux.

In 2013, Wohl released his first full-length album, Corps Exquis, on New Amsterdam Records to broad critical acclaim. The New York Times praised it as a "boldly surreal aural experience" while Pitchfork gave it high marks calling Wohl "an original voice." His second album, Holographic, was commissioned by performing arts organizations Liquid Music (of The Saint Paul Chamber Orchestra), the Massachusetts Museum of Contemporary Art, the Baryshnikov Arts Center and the Indianapolis Museum of Art, and was released in 2013, again on New Amsterdam Records. His third album Etat came out on Nonesuch Records and New Amsterdam in June 2019.

In 2012 Wohl collaborated on the score for The Color of Time, a film about poet C.K. Williams featuring James Franco, Mila Kunis and Jessica Chastain. In 2018 and 2019 he scored two of Oscar winning director Morgan Neville's documentaries: They'll Love Me When I'm Dead and Shangri-LA. The same years he wrote the music for Project Blue Book, a television series produced by Robert Zemeckis.

From 2008 to 2015, Wohl served on the music composition faculty at Sarah Lawrence College in New York.
