= Gabriel Kahane =

American singer-songwriter (born 1981)

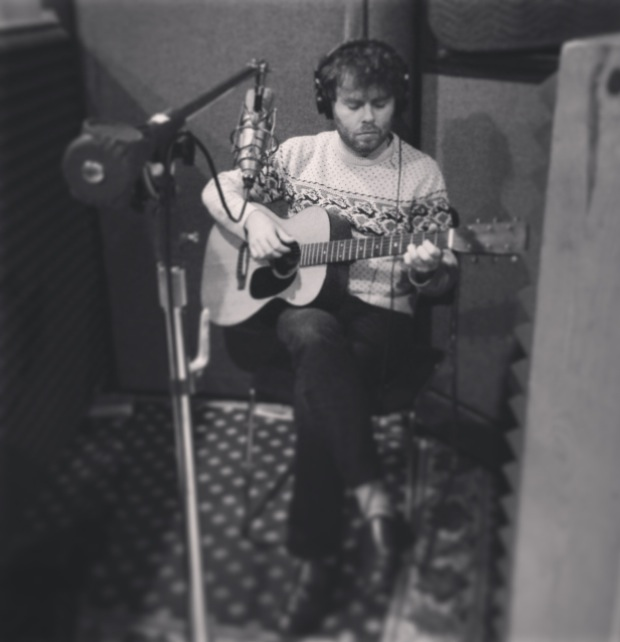

Background information
- Born: 1981 (age 44–45); Venice Beach, California, U.S.
- Genre: Singer-songwriter • classical
- Education: Brown University (BMus)
- Relatives: Jeffrey Kahane (father)

Gabriel Kahane (born July 10, 1981) is an American composer and singer-songwriter.

== Early life and education ==
Born in Venice Beach, California, Kahane is the son of a psychologist mother and the concert pianist Jeffrey Kahane. He attended the New England Conservatory before transferring to Brown University, where he wrote his first musical and graduated with a bachelor's degree in music.

== Career ==
=== Songwriting ===
Kahane's style is often compared to Sufjan Stevens and Rufus Wainwright and he has collaborated with both of these artists.

Kahane released a self-titled album, Gabriel Kahane, on Family Records in 2008, receiving positive reviews.

In September 2011, Kahane released his second singer-songwriter album, Where Are The Arms, on StorySound Records. It was recorded with many of his regular collaborators, including Rob Moose on violin and guitar, Matt Johnson on drums, and Casey Foubert, who also helped mix and produce it, on various instruments. These three musicians would also collaborate with him on his next album, The Ambassador.

For his 2014 album, The Ambassador, he used ten addresses in L.A. to write songs from the perspectives of characters both real and imaginary. The album was featured in Rolling Stone, Vogue, and Paste, and Kahane also wrote a piece about exploring L.A. through music for The New Yorker. The album was staged by Tony Award winner John Tiffany with set design by Tony Award winner Christine Jones at the Brooklyn Academy of Music and Carolina Performing Arts in the fall of 2014 and at University of California, Los Angeles in the spring of 2015. The song "Empire Liquor Mart (9127 S. Figueroa St.)" from The Ambassador was selected by NPR as one of their NPR Music's Favorite Songs of 2014.

After the 2016 election, he embarked on a cross-country train trip that yielded the 2018 album Book of Travelers.

=== Composing and performance ===
Kahane's best-known work, the song cycle Craigslistlieder, which was his first concert work and was re-released by indie record label Family Records in 2008, sets real Craigslist ads to music. Other artists have covered this voice-and-piano piece, and Audra McDonald has included Craigslistlieder in her standard repertoire.

Kahane performed regularly at Rockwood Music Hall, where he had artistic residencies beginning as early as 2009.

In the spring of 2010, Gabriel Kahane performed as part of the American Songbook at Lincoln Center, garnering praise from the New York Times. During the 2010–11 season, he performed with cellist Alisa Weilerstein in a duo recital featuring music composed by Kahane, including Little Sleep's Head Sprouting Hair in the Moonlight. After writing a piano concerto for Natasha Paremski, he was commissioned by the Kronos Quartet to write The Red Book, a string quartet based on Anne Carson's Autobiography of Red, and by the Los Angeles Philharmonic for a large chamber work. Crane Palimpsest, a work about the Brooklyn Bridge, was conducted by Kahane's father, Jeffrey Kahane, conducting the Los Angeles Chamber Orchestra.

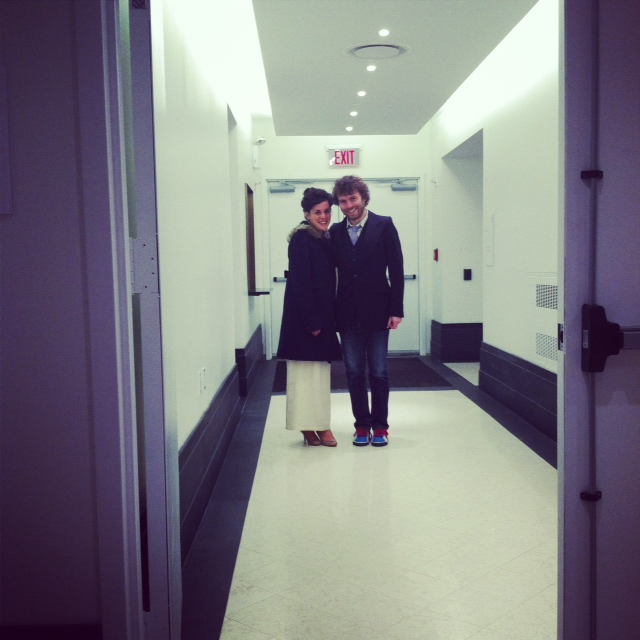
Gabriel Kahane backstage at Carnegie Hall

As part of his 2012–2013 residency with the Orpheus Chamber Orchestra, Kahane wrote Gabriel's Guide to the 48 States inspired by the American Guide Series, commissioned by the government during the Great Depression. The piece received its New York Premiere at Carnegie Hall in April 2013 with Orpheus playing and Kahane singing.

In 2016, he was a soloist with the Naumburg Orchestral Concerts, in the Naumburg Bandshell, Central Park, in the summer series.

Other notable compositions include Come On All You Ghosts, a three-part song cycle setting Matthew Zapruder's poetry for a baritone and string quartet, and he frequently performs and records with such artists as Timo Andres, Brooklyn Rider, Rob Moose, Punch Brothers, and Chris Thile. In August 2019 he was appointed Creative Chair of the Oregon Symphony in Portland, Oregon.

=== Musical theater ===
Gabriel Kahane began to work in theater in New York City after winning a Kennedy Center American College Theater Festival Award for Straight Man, which he wrote in college. He worked with New York theater company Les Freres Corbusier, music directing A Very Merry Unauthorized Children's Scientology Pageant and the LA production of Bloody Bloody Andrew Jackson for Michael Friedman and Alex Timbers.

His musical February House, commissioned by The Public Theater, told the story of a Brooklyn World War II-era commune, where W.H. Auden, Gypsy Rose Lee, Benjamin Britten, Peter Pears, Carson McCullers, Jane Bowles, and Paul Bowles all lived together.

His album The Ambassador was staged at Brooklyn Academy of Music (BAM) in 2014–2015 by Tony Award winner John Tiffany with set design by Tony Award winner Christine Jones. In 2017, Kahane returned to BAM to present a multi-media solo concert of his album Book of Travelers, directed by Tony Award nominee Daniel Fish.

Kahane has been commissioned by the Signature Theatre (Arlington, Virginia) and The Public Theater in New York City and is currently under commission for new pieces for both theaters.

In September 2024, Kahane performed two of his albums, Book of Travelers and Magnificent Bird, in rep at Playwrights Horizons in New York City.

=== Elevator Songs with Roomful of Teeth ===
In April 2026, Kahane and Roomful of Teeth released Elevator Songs a high concept album centered on the elevator of an imaginary, multidimensional hotel and its occupants.

== Personal life ==
Kahane spent much of his career in Brooklyn, New York City. In March, 2020, Kahane moved to Portland, Oregon. He currently performs his original songs in venues across the United States.

An accomplished scholastic chess player, Gabriel achieved the title of "Expert" at age 14.

== Works ==
=== Orchestra ===
- Crane Palimpsest (2012) for baritone and chamber orchestra, co-commissioned by the American Composers Orchestra and the Los Angeles Chamber Orchestra
- Gabriel’s Guide to the 48 States (2013) for baritone, electric guitar, banjo, and chamber orchestra, commissioned by Orpheus Chamber Orchestra
- Freight & Salvage (2015) for string orchestra, commissioned by A Far Cry, The Knights, and the Orlando Philharmonic
- Nocturama (2016) for large orchestra, commissioned by the Interlochen Academy for the Arts

=== Large ensemble ===
- Orinoco Sketches (2011) for piano, baritone, guitar, and large chamber ensemble, commissioned by the Los Angeles Philharmonic

=== Chamber ===
- For the Union Dead (2008) for flute, clarinet (doubling bass clarinet), trumpet, banjo, piano, voice, and string trio (with violin doubling electric guitar), commissioned by the Verbier Festival
- Pocket Concerto (2009) for solo trumpet, flute, clarinet, and string trio (with violin doubling electric guitar), commissioned by Linda and Stuart Nelson
- The Red Book (2010) for string quartet, commissioned by the Kronos Quartet
- Little Sleep's Head Sprouting Hair in the Moonlight (2010) for cello, piano, and baritone, commissioned by Linda and Stuart Nelson
- Come On All You Ghosts (2011) for string quartet and baritone, commissioned by Bravo! Vail for the Calder Quartet
- Line Up! (2012) for string quartet, commissioned by Caramoor International Music Festival for the Linden Quartet
- The Fiction Issue (2012) for string quartet, piano, reed organ, two guitars, and two solo voices (one male and one female), commissioned by Carnegie Hall for Brooklyn Rider, Shara Worden, and the composer
- Fun House (2012) for flute (doubling piccolo), B♭ clarinet (doubling bass clarinet), B♭ trumpet (doubling piccolo trumpet and chromatic harmonica), violin (doubling electric guitar), viola, and cello, written for yMusic
- Without a Frame (2013) for flute, bass clarinet, trumpet, electric or acoustic guitar, viola, and cello, written for yMusic
- Bradbury Studies (2014) for string quartet, commissioned by the Los Angeles Chamber Orchestra

=== Keyboard ===
- Sonata (2008) for piano, commissioned by Linda and Stuart Nelson
- Django: Tiny Variations on a Big Dog (2009) for piano, commissioned by Jeffrey Kahane
- The Baffled King (after Leonard Cohen) (2011) for piano, commissioned by the Ecstatic Music Festival
- Being Alive (after Stephen Sondheim) (2011) for piano, commissioned by Anthony De Mare
- Works on Paper (2016) for piano, commissioned by Carnegie Hall for Timo Andres

=== Vocal ===
- Craigslistlieder (2006) for voice and piano
- The Memory Palace (2011) for baritone and piano, commissioned by New York Festival of Song
- Three Vernacular Songs (2013) for voice and piano
- Sorkin Rants (2015) for voice and piano

=== Theater ===
- Caravan Man (2007) in one act, ensemble cast, commissioned by the Williamstown Theatre Festival
- February House (2012) in two acts, ensemble cast, commissioned by The Public Theater

=== Miscellaneous ===
- Étude: Cobalt Cure (2010) for solo violin, commissioned by Festival Vestfold

== Discography ==
=== As Gabriel Kahane ===
- Five Songs (2005) [EP]
- Walking Away from Winter (2007) [EP]
- Gabriel Kahane (2008)
- Where are the Arms (2011)
- The Ambassador (2014)
- Book of Travelers (2018)
- Magnificent Bird (2022)
- Elevator Songs with Roomful of Teeth (2026)

=== Compilations ===
- Red Hot + Bach (2014) [Sony Masterworks]

=== Sideman/arranger ===
- Osso String Quartet – Run Rabbit Run (2009), arrangements
- Dark Was the Night (2009) [compilation], piano cadenza
- Loudon Wainwright III – High Wide & Handsome: The Charlie Poole Project (2009), piano
- Sufjan Stevens – All Delighted People (2010) [EP], string arrangements, background vocals
- Sufjan Stevens – The Age of Adz (2010), string arrangements, background vocals
- Loudon Wainwright III – Older Than My Old Man Now (2012), piano, arrangements
- Brad Mehldau – Finding Gabriel (2019), vocals

=== Original cast albums ===
- February House (2012)

=== Composer ===
- Natasha Paremski – Brahms, Kahane, Prokofiev (2011)
- yMusic – Beautiful Mechanical (2011)
- Five Borough Songbook (2012)
- Henning Kraggerud – Munch Suite (2013)
- yMusic – Year of the Dragon (Single) (2013)
