= Judd Greenstein =

American composer (born 1979)

Judd Greenstein (born 1979) is an American composer of contemporary classical music, and an avid promoter of new music in New York City. He is also a co-director of New Amsterdam Records.

== Life and career ==
Judd Greenstein was born and raised in Manhattan, and attended Hunter College Elementary School and Hunter College High School. He received his undergraduate degree from Williams College, and his masters in music composition from the Yale School of Music where he studied with Martin Bresnick, Aaron Jay Kernis, and Ezra Laderman. Shortly after Yale, Greenstein began to draw attention in the New York classical scene for the pulse-driven quality and "impressive confidence" of his music, which was being performed at Carnegie Hall, Tanglewood Music Center, and the Tribeca New Music Festival. The New Yorker critic Alex Ross also regularly lauded the exciting freshness of Greenstein's work as early as 2005. Since then he has received dozens of commissions, and has had his music performed at leading classical music festivals including Bang on a Can Marathon Concerts, Tanglewood, the Carlsbad Music Festival, and the MATA Festival.

In addition to his work as a composer, Greenstein has tirelessly demonstrated his support for new music and young composers through various forms of curation and community organization. Since 2008, he has served as co-director of the non-profit label New Amsterdam Records along with William Brittelle and Sarah Kirkland Snider. He describes the label as being dedicated to supporting artists "whose work is a reflection of truly integrated music influences," which has subsequently placed it at the forefront of the indie-classical music scene. In 2011, Greenstein curated the Ecstatic Music Festival at Merkin Concert Hall, giving indie-classical and indie-pop artists like Owen Pallett, Shara Nova, Julianna Barwick, and Victoire an "uptown" arena to showcase their sophisticated endeavors. The festival has been compared to the genre-indifferent Bang on a Can, but with less of the latter's highbrow intimidation and intellectualized atmosphere.

In 2014, Greenstein, together with Michi Wiancko, composed the score for the feature film The Mend, which premiered at the SXSW Film Festival in March 2014. In 2015, Four on the Floor (2006) was performed in a premiere [as arranged] at the Naumburg Orchestral Concerts, in the Naumburg Bandshell, Central Park, in the summer series.

== Musical style ==
Critics have frequently commented on Greenstein's idiosyncratic style, which maintains a pulse-driven poppish sensibility while employing a sophisticated harmonic language. He is often identified with a group of young New York-based composers like Nico Muhly, Missy Mazzoli, and Corey Dargel, who fuse the accessibility of minimalist classical music with popular vernaculars to create genre-indifferent works, commonly labeled "indie-classical". In a detailed analysis, musicologist Kyle Gann remarked on Greenstein's typically polymetric compositional structures, giving his music a "foot-tapping pop surface in front of a background rhythmic complexity", akin to the 1980s advent of totalism.

== Works ==
Central to Greenstein's compositional career has been his work with NOW Ensemble, for which he is the co-artistic director and has composed several pieces. The ensemble has performed his music along with the chamber music of other young, emerging composers in a wide range of settings, including (Le) Poisson Rouge, Carnegie Hall, and the Library of Congress. Greenstein has also closely collaborated with a number of New York's young solo musicians and ensembles, including violist Nadia Sirota, soprano Anne-Carolyn Bird, percussionist Samuel Solomon, the political chamber ensemble Newspeak, pianist Michael Mizrahi and others.

Greenstein's most recent project is The Yehudim—an ensemble of vintage keyboards, mixed voices, electric guitars, and percussion that "explores characters from the Hebrew Bible, using the strange stories of their lives and the ancient writings around their characters to weave contemporary narratives." The Yehudim had its concert debut in March 2011 at Merkin Concert Hall premiering Greenstein's piece "Sh'lomo", and was called "an epiphany" by Steve Smith of The New York Times. He has also recently been commissioned to write works for ETHEL, Gibbs & Main, and a large-scale work for the Minnesota Orchestra.

Greenstein's piece "Still Point," commissioned by pianist Awadagin Pratt, was released in 2023 as one of six newly commissioned compositions by six different composers on Pratt's CD Stillpoint, performed by Pratt, the chamber orchestra A Far Cry, and the vocal ensemble Roomful of Teeth.

== See also ==
- A Marvelous Order
