= Corey Dargel =

American classical composer

Corey Dargel (born October 19, 1977, in McAllen, Texas) is a composer, lyricist, and singer who makes a mix of contemporary classical and electronic pop music.

== Career ==
Formally trained in music composition, Dargel studied with Pauline Oliveros, John Luther Adams, and Brenda Hutchinson, and received a Bachelor of Music from Oberlin.

Dargel writes and composes all of his songs. In his earlier compositions, he accompanied his own voice with prepared electronics. His debut album, Less Famous Than You, released in May 2006 with Use Your Teeth records, is in the singer-songwriter style and incorporates totalist rhythmic relationships. His next album, Other People's Love Songs, released in 2008 with the contemporary classical label New Amsterdam Records, combines indie pop and postminimalist contemporary classical music.

In May 2010, New Amsterdam released a two-CD set entitled Someone Will Take Care of Me, which combines two song cycles performed by Dargel and other musicians live. The instrumentation for these two cycles is in the classical song cycle tradition.

== Discography ==
=== Studio albums ===
- Less Famous Than You (Use Your Teeth, 2006)
- Other People's Love Songs (New Amsterdam Records, 2008)
- Someone Will Take Care of Me (New Amsterdam Records, 2010), with the International Contemporary Ensemble, Kathleen Supové and David T. Little
- Last Words from Texas (Automatic Heartbreak, 2011)
- OK It's Not OK (New Amsterdam Records, 2015)

=== Compilations ===
- Unreleased Songs (2001–2011) (Automatic Heartbreak, 2011)
