= Roomful of Teeth =

American vocal ensemble

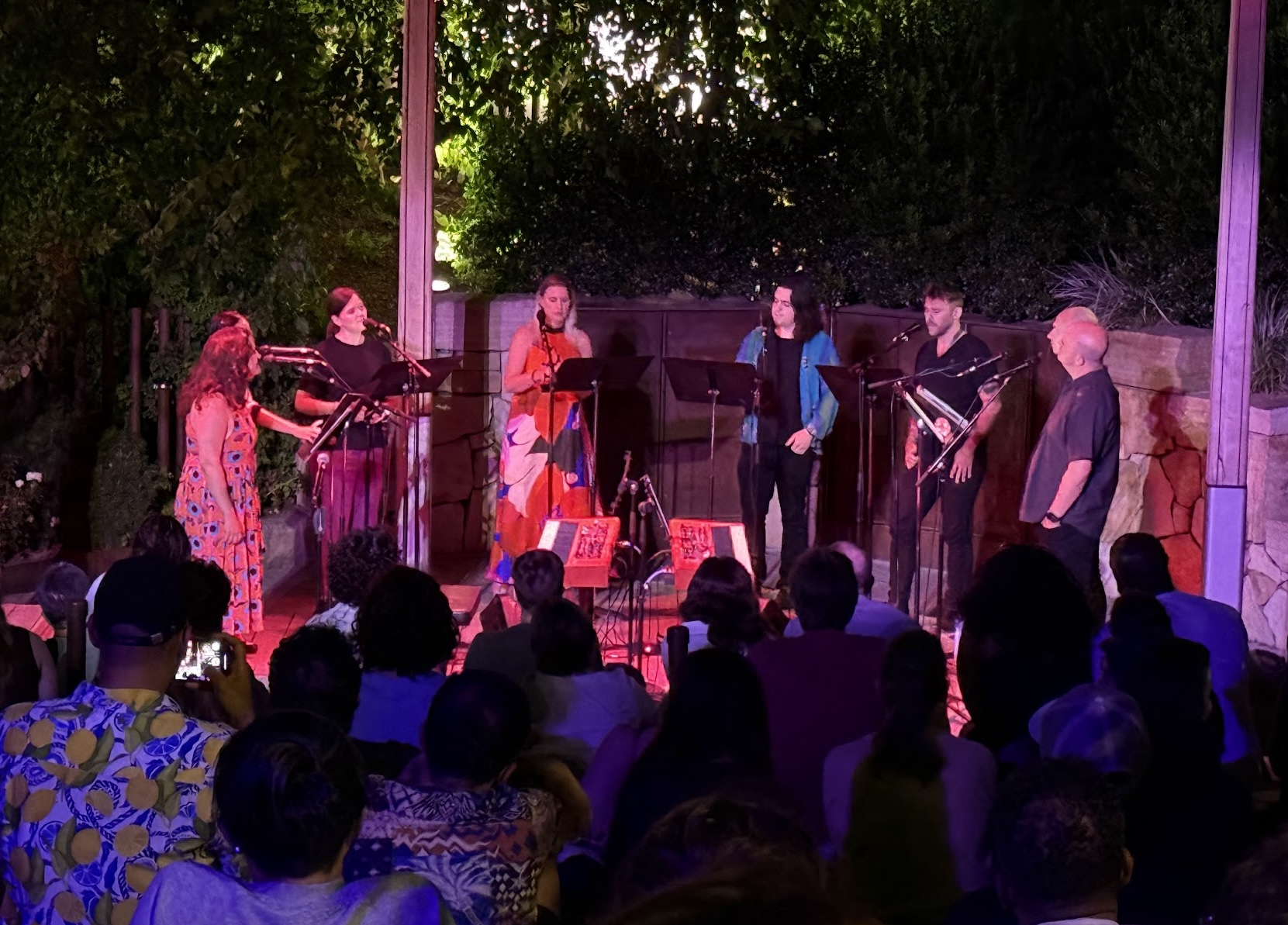
- Roomful of Teeth in 2025

Background information
- Origin: Williamstown, Massachusetts, US
- Genres: Choral; classical
- Years active: 2009–present
- Members: Eliza Bagg; Cameron Beauchamp; Steven Bradshaw; Dashon Burton; Mingjia Chen; Martha Cluver; Estelí Gomez; Jodie Landau; Thann Scoggin; Caroline Shaw; Virginia Warnken Kelsey
- Past members: Eric Dudley; Avery Griffin; Brad Wells
- Website: roomfulofteeth.org

Roomful of Teeth is an American vocal ensemble founded in 2009 by Brad Wells and Caroline Shaw. Their 2012 debut, self-titled album was nominated for three Grammys in 2014, and their 2024 fourth studio album, Rough Magic, was nominated in two categories. They have studied and performed in a wide variety of classical and traditional styles of singing from around the world.

== History ==
Roomful of Teeth was founded in 2009 by Brad Wells and Caroline Shaw. According to co-artistic director Cameron Beauchamp, the vocal ensemble was inspired by the contemporary ensembles Sō Percussion, Alarm Will Sound, and Bang on a Can; Wells and Beauchamp desired a vocal counterpart to these ensembles. Their original aim was "to gather eight classically trained singers with a shared sense of curiosity and exploration, to create a new repertoire of vocal chamber music".

The project's debut album, Roomful of Teeth, was released in 2012 and nominated in three categories for the 2014 56th Annual Grammy Awards, including Best Engineer for Classical Album, Best Chamber Music/Small Ensemble Performance, and Best Contemporary Classical Composition. The album subsequently received a Grammy for Best Chamber Music/Small Ensemble Performance.

In April 2013, Shaw received the Pulitzer Prize for Music for Partita for 8 Voices, the four movements of which appear on the group's debut album. An iTunes exclusive EP of Partita was subsequently released and ranked no. 1 on iTunes Classical charts.

Roomful of Teeth's second full-length recording, Render, was released in April 2015, and featured works by Wally Gunn, Missy Mazzoli, William Brittelle, Caleb Burhans, ensemble tenor Eric Dudley, and artistic director Brad Wells.

In October 2019, the band was the subject of a controversy on Instagram and Twitter, when several performers of Inuit throat singing, including Canadian Inuk throat singer Tanya Tagaq, accused Caroline Shaw and Roomful of Teeth of having engaged in cultural appropriation and exoticism for their use of throat singing without sufficiently crediting or compensating the creators of that intellectual property, in particular in regards to the ensemble's signature work, Partita for 8 Voices. As a result of this criticism, the ensemble agreed to make a number of changes in how they approached source materials, including more prominently crediting teachers and coaches, reading a source acknowledgment statement before performances, and exploring other ways to support the work of indigenous musicians.

In March 2020, Roomful of Teeth performed at Ukaria Cultural Centre in Adelaide, South Australia, as part of the Adelaide Festival. They played passages from Partita for 8 Voices as well as a collaboration with Australian composer Wally Gunn, in what was their last performance in 18 months, owing to the global COVID-19 pandemic. For around ten years, they had pursued their original goals, combining and learning various singing techniques and traditions from around the world. During the hiatus caused by the pandemic, they started experimenting with more technology and instrumentation and were given home access to a range of beta software from the developers of Auto-Tune.

Roomful of Teeth's fourth studio album, Rough Magic (2023), includes a three-part suite called "Psychedelics" by William Brittelle, and the five-part "The Isle", composed by Shaw. The latter was commissioned by the Folger Shakespeare Library in Washington, D.C. and inspired by The Tempest. It also features works by Eve Beglarian and Peter S. Shin. In February 2024, the album was nominated in two categories at the Grammy Awards: Best Contemporary Classical Composition and Best Chamber Music/Small Ensemble Performance; it won in the latter category. In 2026, the group released the album Elevator Songs, a collaboration with musician Gabriel Kahane.

== Performances and commissions ==
As of 2015, the ensemble gathered annually at the Massachusetts Museum of Contemporary Art, where they studied Tuvan throat singing, yodeling, belting, Inuit throat singing, Korean p'ansori, Georgian singing, Sardinian cantu a tenore, Hindustani music, and Persian classical singing, with some of the world's top performers and teachers of the styles.

Commissioned composers include Elena Ruehr, Christine Southworth & Evan Ziporyn, Rinde Eckert, Judd Greenstein, Caleb Burhans, Merrill Garbus, William Brittelle, Sarah Kirkland Snider, Missy Mazzoli, Sam Amidon, Michael Harrison, Ted Hearne, and Julia Wolfe.

In August 2014, Roomful of Teeth were spotlighted at the International Federation for Choral Music symposium in Seoul, Korea (one of only three American vocal ensembles invited).

== In film ==
The third movement of Shaw's composition Partita for 8 Voices, "III. Courante", performed by Roomful of Teeth, is used in the 2022 film Tár.

== Solo projects ==
Caroline Shaw has undertaken a number of solo projects, including collaborating with Kanye West on a few tracks, and contributing arrangements to Spanish pop singer Rosalía's 2025 album Lux.

== Members ==
- Cameron Beauchamp
- Dashon Burton
- Martha Cluver
- Eric Dudley
- Estelí Gomez
- Avery Griffin
- Caroline Shaw
- Virginia Warnken Kelsey
- Brad Wells

== Discography ==
Studio albums

- Roomful of Teeth (2012)
- Render (2015)
- 3 (2019)
- Rough Magic (2023)
- Elevator Songs with Gabriel Kahane (2026)

EPs

- Caroline Shaw: Partita for 8 Voices (2013)
- Caroline Shaw: Partita for 8 Voices (Remixes) (2016)
- Michael Harrison: Just Constellations (2020)

Other albums

- The Colorado: Music from the Motion Picture (2016)
- Berio: Sinfonia – Boulez: Notations I–IV – Ravel: La valse, M.72 (2018)
- Wally Gunn: The Ascendant (2020)
- Stillpoint with Awadagin Pratt and A Far Cry (2023)

Singles

- "May the Angels" (2019)
- "The Chair" (2019)
- "Coloring Book: No. 5, Your People" (2019)
