= Yevgeniy Sharlat =

American composer

- Born: 1977 (age 48–49)

Academic work
- Discipline: Music
- Institutions: University of Austin Texas

Yevgeniy Sharlat is Professor of Composition at the University of Texas at Austin Butler School of Music. He is a 2020 Guggenheim Fellow.
