= A Far Cry =

American chamber orchestra

A Far Cry is a Boston-based chamber orchestra. The orchestra is self-conducted and consists of 18 musicians called "The Criers". It was founded in 2007 by a group of 17 musicians in Boston. The orchestra performs in Jamaica Plain and previously served as chamber orchestra in residence at the Isabella Stewart Gardner Museum. A Far Cry has toured across America and undertook its first European tour in 2012. It also collaborates with local students in an educational partnership with the New England Conservatory and Project STEP. The orchestra has released nine albums, two of which have been nominated for Grammy Awards for Best Chamber Music / Small Ensemble Performance: Dreams & Prayers in 2015 and Visions and Variations in 2019.

== The Criers ==
Alex Fortes is a violinist from San Diego with degrees from Harvard College and Mannes College. His teachers include Mark Steinberg, Peter Zazofsky, Hernan Constantino, Mary Gerard, and Michael Gaisler.

Annie Rabbat is a violinist from Chicago who received her bachelor's degree from Indiana University and her master's degree from the Juilliard School. After a year at Stony Brook University, she went to the New England Conservatory. Her mentors include Miriam Fried, Robert Mann, Pamela Frank, Ani Kavafian, and Phil Setzer.

Caitlin Lynch is a violist whose musical career has led her to perform worldwide in collaboration with artists ranging from Itzhak Perlman to Radiohead’s Jonny Greenwood.

Celia Hatton is a violist based in New York City. She earned her bachelor's degree with Kim Kashkashian from New England Conservatory receiving a Presidential Distinction Award Scholarship. She received her master's degree and professional studies certificate from Manhattan School of Music, where she studied with Karen Dreyfus as a recipient of a William Randolph Hearst Scholarship. Hatton's solos as principal viola of Experiential Orchestra are on the Grammy-winning album The Prison.

Francesca McNeeley is a cellist based in Boston, originally from Haiti. She attended Princeton University with a primary focus in politics, and received scholarships to attend Rice University and the New England Conservatory for her graduate degrees in cello performance. She performs regularly with Castle of Our Skins, the Celebrity Series of Boston, and as a substitute with the Boston Symphony & Boston Pops Orchestras.

Gabriela Díaz is a violinist originally from Georgia. She is on the faculty of Wellesley College and the Longy School of Music at Bard College. In 2024 she became the newest member of the Kronos Quartet.

Hannah Collins is a cellist and teaching artist. She earned a B.S. in biomedical engineering summa cum laude from Yale College and has graduate degrees in cello performance from the Yale School of Music, the Royal Conservatory of The Hague, and the City University of New York's Graduate Center. Her principal mentors include Stefan Reuss, Ole Akahoshi, Aldo Parisot, Michel Strauss, Robert Mealy, and Marcy Rosen. Collins is associate professor of cello at the University of Kansas School of Music.

Jae Young Cosmos Lee is a violinist from Korea. Lee holds degrees from the University of Michigan, the Cleveland Institute of Music, and the New England Conservatory.

Jason Fisher is a violist who grew up in Seattle. He received his bachelor's degree from the Peabody Institute, studying with Victoria Chiang, and his master's degree from Longy School of Music, studying with Roger Tapping.

Jesse Irons is a violinist from Berlin, Vermont. He received his undergraduate and graduate degrees from the Peabody Institute.

Lizzie Burns is a bassist and faculty member at the Hartt School of Music and the Mannes Conservatory at The New School. She has recorded for the Sony Masterworks, Deutsche Grammophon, Naxos, New Amsterdam, and Nonesuch, and can be heard on film and television soundtracks, including "Succession".

Megumi Stohs Lewis is a violinist from Portland, Oregon. She has appeared as a guest artist with the Landmarks Orchestra in Boston, the Sapporo Philharmonic in Japan, and on tour with Britain's Jethro Tull. Her teachers include Camilla Wicks, Ian Swensen, Lucy Chapman, Roger Tapping, and Phoebe Carrai.

Michael Unterman is a cellist in the master's degree program at the New England Conservatory. He studied at the New England Conservatory for four years, and in Barcelona, Spain, for one year.

Miki-Sophia Cloud is a violinist who studied at Harvard College, Vienna Music University, Yale School of Music, and the Perlman Music Program. As of 2013, she is a doctoral student at the New England Conservatory.

Rafi Popper-Keizer is a cellist residing in Cambridge, who received his master's of music and artist diploma from the New England Conservatory. He is the principal cellist of the Boston Modern Orchestra Project, Emmanuel Music, Chameleon Arts Ensemble, Monadnock Music, Cantata Singers, and the Boston Philharmonic Orchestra.

Sarah Darling is a violist and baroque violinist from Boston. She received her B.A. from Harvard College, spent a year at the Juilliard School and the Conservatorium van Amsterdam, and completed an Artist Diploma at the Hochschule fur Musik Freiburg as a recipient of the Beebe, Paine, and DAAD grants for study abroad. As of 2013, she is a doctoral student at the New England Conservatory with Kim Kashkashian.

Zenas Hsu is a violinist originally from San Jose, California with degrees from Curtis Institute of Music and the New England Conservatory. He is a founding member of California's Chamber Music by the Bay, and concertmaster of the Boston-based Phoenix.

== Organization ==
The Criers take turns leading the ensemble, and are in no particular hierarchy. All members are simultaneously leaders and followers. All members take turns as section leader during rehearsal. With the exception of the cellists, players stand while performing. The group's goal is "to wrestle the music they love back from the cultural baggage it's accumulated." It has been labeled a "post-classical" ensemble and participated in Judd Greenstein's Ecstatic Music Festival.

== Programs ==
A Far Cry's programs include music from various periods, such as J.S. Bach, Heinrich Ignaz Franz Biber, Mozart, Elgar, Tchaikovsky, Bartók, Astor Piazzolla, Arvo Pärt, Steve Reich, and Osvaldo Golijov. In 2013, The New York Times described its playing as "mixing solemn with snappy".

Its programs usually combine older works with new works. As part of their ensemble residency at the Isabella Gardner Museum, the group presented a seven-concert series called the Avant Gardner series, which focused on forward momentum and repeating patterns in music, with modern composers Andrew Norman, Christopher Theofanidis, Louis Andriessen, and the Baroque composer Bach.

== Performances and tours ==
A Far Cry has played with cellist Yo-Yo Ma, toured across America, and had its debut tour in 2012 in Europe. It has also played at venues such as Calderwood Hall at the Gardner Museum, New England Conservatory's Jordan Hall and Royale, a Boston nightclub.

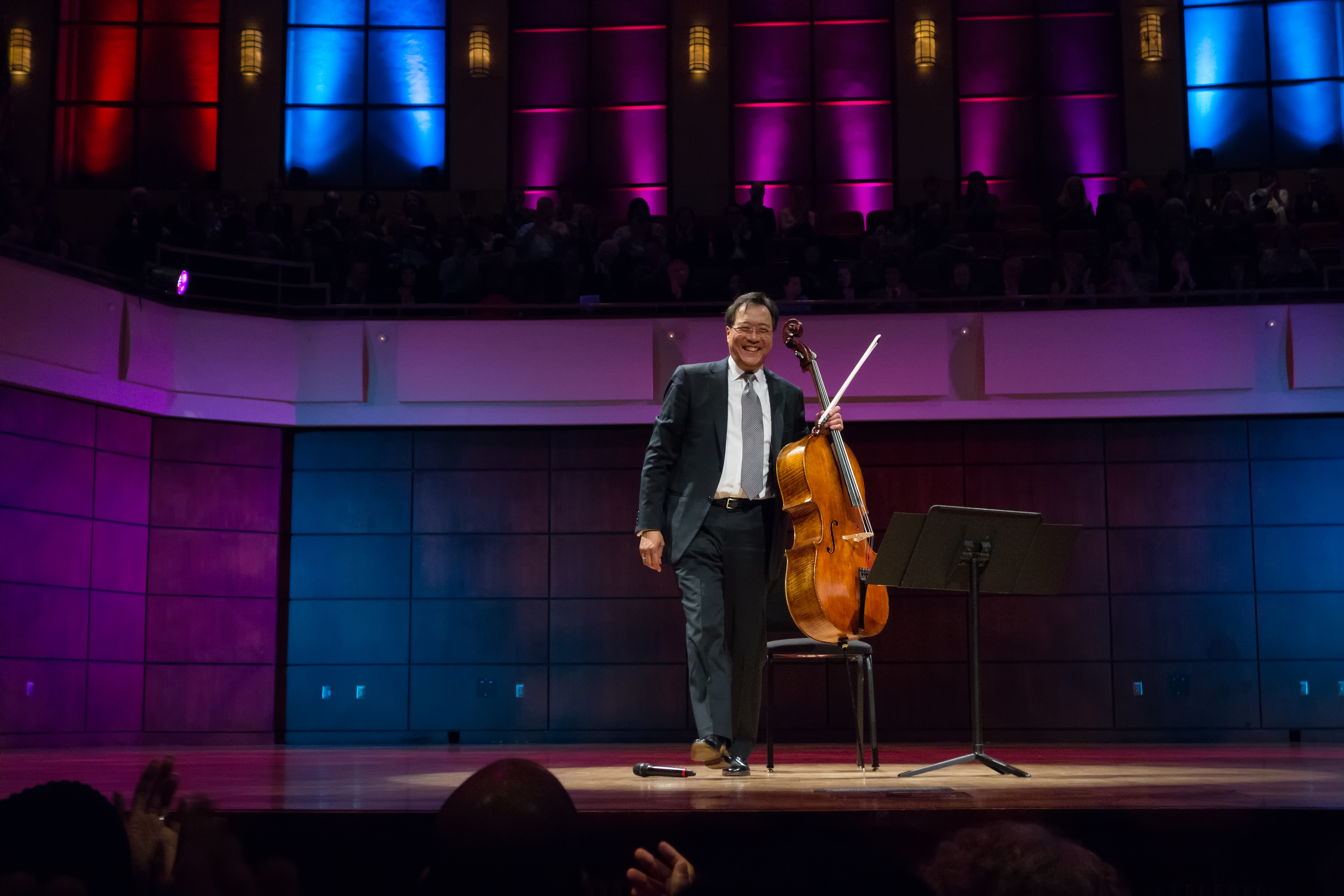

== Discography ==
- A Far Cry: Debut (2009)
- Copland; Aldridge: Clarinet Concertos (2010)
- Piazzolla (2011)
- TRACER (2013)
- The Mozart Sessions (2012)
- The Law of Mosaics (2014)
- Dreams & Prayers (2014)
- Circles: Piano Concertos by Bach & Glass
- Visions and Variations (2018)
- The Blue Hour (2022)
- A Gentleman of Istanbul (2023)
- STILLPOINT (2023)
