= New Amsterdam Records =

Record label in New York City

- Founded: 2008
- Founder: Judd Greenstein, Sarah Kirkland Snider, William Brittelle
- Distributors: Nonesuch Records, Naxos Records
- Genre: Contemporary classical, avant-garde
- Country of origin: U.S.
- Location: New York City
- Official website: www.newamrecords.com

New Amsterdam Records is an independent record label in New York City that was formed in 2008 by Judd Greenstein, Sarah Kirkland Snider, and William Brittelle to promote classically trained musicians who fall between traditional genre boundaries. Often abbreviated as NewAm, the organization has been hailed as a central force in creating the "indie-classical" scene., and was granted 501(c)(3) status in 2011 with the mission of "supporting and representing the post-genre new music community."

== Background ==
New Amsterdam Records was founded to support the developing genre of music coming from people with great educations in composition who were also influenced by pop and jazz music and did not fit into the music industry binary of classical or pop. NewAm has been described favorably by Seth Colter Walls in Newsweek as breaking down genre boundaries, "making a nice little tradition out of breaking tradition," and striking a healthy balance between old traditions (such as classical and jazz) and contemporary music."

In an interview with mental floss magazine, co-founder Judd Greenstein explains that they look for artists "whose work is a reflection of truly integrated musical influences. In other words, we don’t want classical-goes-rock or electronic-music-with-some-violins – we want music where people are being as personal and honest as they can be, while opening themselves up fully to all the music that they love."

Furthermore, in an interview with I Care If You Listen, co-founders and co-artistic directors William Brittelle, Judd Greenstein, and Sarah Kirkland Snider stated that “This variety stems from the inherent variety of individual composers not just as composers, but as listeners, each with a unique experience of listening to music in the world, and each therefore with a unique way of manifesting that experience in newly-created art. This is what we call a musical “voice,” and the voices of composers we release draw from an innumerable set of influences. A post-genre approach to composition inherently breeds a distinctiveness in those composers’ musical voices.”

== Business model ==
Making an album can involve many costs, such as renting a recording studio, paying the musicians, creating album art, and manufacturing copies of the album. At New Amsterdam, the musician, not the label, picks up the cost of making the album, but the musician gets a higher percentage of royalties that come from sales.

In 2017, the label revamped its model to function as an all-in-one non-profit record label, presenter and artist service organization, aiming to create long-term sustainability in the face of a quickly changing music industry. Their support continues to extend far beyond album distribution, and artists continue to retain full ownership of their recordings. NewAm partners with artists to share the costs through project-specific fundraising and grants 100% of album sales directly to the artists.

In 2019 New Amsterdam announced two initiatives, including a new partnership with Nonesuch Records and the Windmill Series, a digitally focused set of releases made available to subscribers in addition to the existing release schedule. The Nonesuch partnership sees the release of approximately three albums per year to support contemporary American composers in realizing ambitious creative projects, with initial releases from composers William Brittelle, Caroline Shaw, and Daniel Wohl. The Windmill Series has seen releases from artists including Arooj Aftab, Timo Andres, Gemma Peacocke, and more. After a subscription exclusivity period, Windmill Series releases are available digitally worldwide.

The label is distributed by Naxos Records in North America.

== Critical reception ==
Justin Davidson, music critic for New York, wrote, "They're part of this generation of people who get out of music school with all of these incredible skills, and all of this culture, and all of this creativity — fully aware that nobody is going to hand them a career. There's no superstructure of an established music industry that is going to pay any attention to these people, because they're not even paying attention to the much more established, mainstream conductors and violinists and orchestras. The ability to get noticed by having some record executive take an interest in you and record you — you know, that's really practically a thing of the past. If you want to make recordings, you've really got to do it yourself."

For New Amsterdam's and (Le) Poisson Rouge's 10-Year Anniversary show in 2018, Davidson write “In their decade of existence, (Le) Poisson Rouge and New Amsterdam have helped seed whole forests of music far beyond the five boroughs.”

NewAm have been compared to Bang on a Can, who also built their own label, community, and performance circuit, in a similar manner, 20 years ago. The difference, however, between the two is that Bang on a Can shared a common musical aesthetic — minimalism — whereas NewAm is more of a musical umbrella. NewAm's artists have become increasingly popular among a broad public while Bang on a Can's primary supporters continue to be larger, more established cultural institutions. "The interesting thing about this group of people, and New Amsterdam, is the real lack of interest in anything that you could call aesthetic categories, or rules about what does and doesn't belong in their sphere of influence," Justin Davidson says.

== Selected discography ==
Release date	Artist	Album
November 20, 2020	Joseph C. Phillips Jr., Numinous	The Grey Land
November 13, 2020	Tristan Perich	Drift Multiply
October 9, 2020	Travis Laplante, Yarn/Wire	Inner Garden
September 29, 2020	Matthew Evan Taylor	The Unheard Mixtapes
September 25, 2020	Sarah Kirkland Snider	Mass for the Endangered
September 18, 2020	Michi Wiancko	Planetary Candidate
August 21, 2020	Roomful of Teeth	The Ascendant - Just Constellations
August 7, 2020	Hub New Music, Robert Honstein	Soul House
July 10, 2020	Jacob Cooper	Terrain
June 5, 2020	Molly Joyce	Breaking and Entering
May 22, 2020	Methods Body	Methods Body
March 4, 2020	iT Boy	The Nail House EP
April 24, 2020	Bec Plexus	Sticklip
April 3, 2020	Ted Hearne	Place
February 14, 2020	yMusic	Ecstatic Science
August 30, 2019	Nathalie Joachim, Spektral Quartet	Fanm d'Ayiti
May 31, 2019	Daniel Wohl	État
May 3, 2019	William Brittelle, Wye Oak (band), Brooklyn Youth Chorus, Metropolis Ensemble	Spiritual America
April 19, 2019	Caroline Shaw and Attacca Quartet	Orange
November 14, 2018	Padma Newsome	The Vanity of trees
October 26, 2018	Brooklyn Youth Chorus	Silent Voices
September 28, 2018	Aizuri Quartet	Blueprinting
September 7, 2018	Mary Halvorson and Robbie Lee	Seed Triangular
May 25, 2018	The Hands Free	The Hands Free
April 26, 2018	Tigue	Strange Paradise
March 30, 2018	Invisible Anatomy	Dissections
February 23, 2018	Subtle Degrees	A Dance That Empties
January 26, 2018	John Hollenbeck (musician) Large Ensemble	All Can Work
November 17, 2017	Emily Pinkerton, Patrick Burke, and NOW Ensemble	Rounder Songs
October 6, 2017	Steven Mackey and Jason Treuting	Orpheus Unsung
August 25, 2017	Nick Photinos	Petits Artéfacts
June 16, 2017	Amir ElSaffar	Not Two
March 31, 2017	Brooklyn Youth Chorus	Black Mountain Songs
March 17, 2017	Jasper String Quartet	Unbound
January 27, 2017	Molly Joyce	Lean Back and Release
November 18, 2016	Vicky Chow	A O R T A
November 4, 2016	Qasim Naqvi	Chronology
October 28, 2016	The Living Earth Show	Dance Music
September 30, 2016	Darcy James Argue's Secret Society	Real Enemies
August 26, 2016	Battle Trance	Blade of Love
May 13, 2016	Roomful of Teeth, Glenn Kotche, Jeffrey Zeigler	The Colorado
April 29, 2016	Deerhoof & Ensemble Dal Niente	Balter / Saunier
March 25, 2016	Michael Mizrahi	Currents
February 29, 2016	Finnegan Shanahan	The Two Halves
January 29, 2016	Daniel Wohl	Holographic
November 13, 2015	TIGUE	Peaks
October 30, 2015	Ted Hearne	The Source
September 4, 2015	Sarah Kirkland Snider	Unremembered
August 28, 2015	Will Mason Ensemble	Beams of the Huge Night
May 26, 2015	NOW Ensemble	Dreamfall
April 28, 2015	Roomful of Teeth	Render
March 31, 2015	Missy Mazzoli	Vespers for a New Dark Age
October 28, 2014	Vicky Chow	Tristan Perich: Surface Image
September 30, 2014	yMusic	Balance Problems
August 26, 2014	Battle Trance	Palace of Wind
July 29, 2014	No Lands	Negative Space
April 29, 2014	Olga Bell	Krai
June 25, 2013	Daniel Wohl	Corps Exquis
April 30, 2013	Darcy James Argue's Secret Society	Brooklyn Babylon
March 26, 2013	Jace Clayton	The Julius Eastman Memory Depot
March 26, 2013	Nadia Sirota	Baroque
May 29, 2012	Michael Mizrahi	The Bright Motion
April 26, 2011	yMusic	Beautiful Mechanical
November 28, 2011	NOW Ensemble	Awake
November 16, 2010	Janus	I am (not)
November 16, 2010	Newspeak	Sweet Light Crude
October 26, 2010	Sarah Kirkland Snider	Penelope
September 28, 2010	Victoire	Cathedral City
June 29, 2010	William Brittelle	Television Landscape
May 25, 2010	Matt Marks	The Little Death: Vol. 1
May 25, 2010	Corey Dargel	Someone Will Take Care of Me
January 26, 2010	itsnotyouitsme	Fallen Nonuments
January 26, 2010	Sam Sadigursky	words project iii: miniatures
May 19, 2009	Nadia Sirota	first things first
May 12, 2009	Darcy James Argue's Secret Society	Infernal Machines
January 27, 2009	QQQ	Unpacking the Trailer...
January 27, 2009	Andrew McKenna Lee	Gravity and Air
September 9, 2008	Sam Sadigursky	Words Project II
October 28, 2008	Corey Dargel	Other People's Love Songs
August 29, 2008	Ted Hearne	Katrina Ballads
June 6, 2008	Build	Build
May 1, 2008	William Brittelle	Mohair Time Warp
January 8, 2008	itsnotyouitsme	walled gardens
January 8, 2008	NOW Ensemble	NOW
May 26, 2007	Sam Sadigursky	The Words Project
