= Bob Cole Conservatory of Music =

Conservatory of Long Beach State University

Coordinates: 33.78804°N 118.11160°W

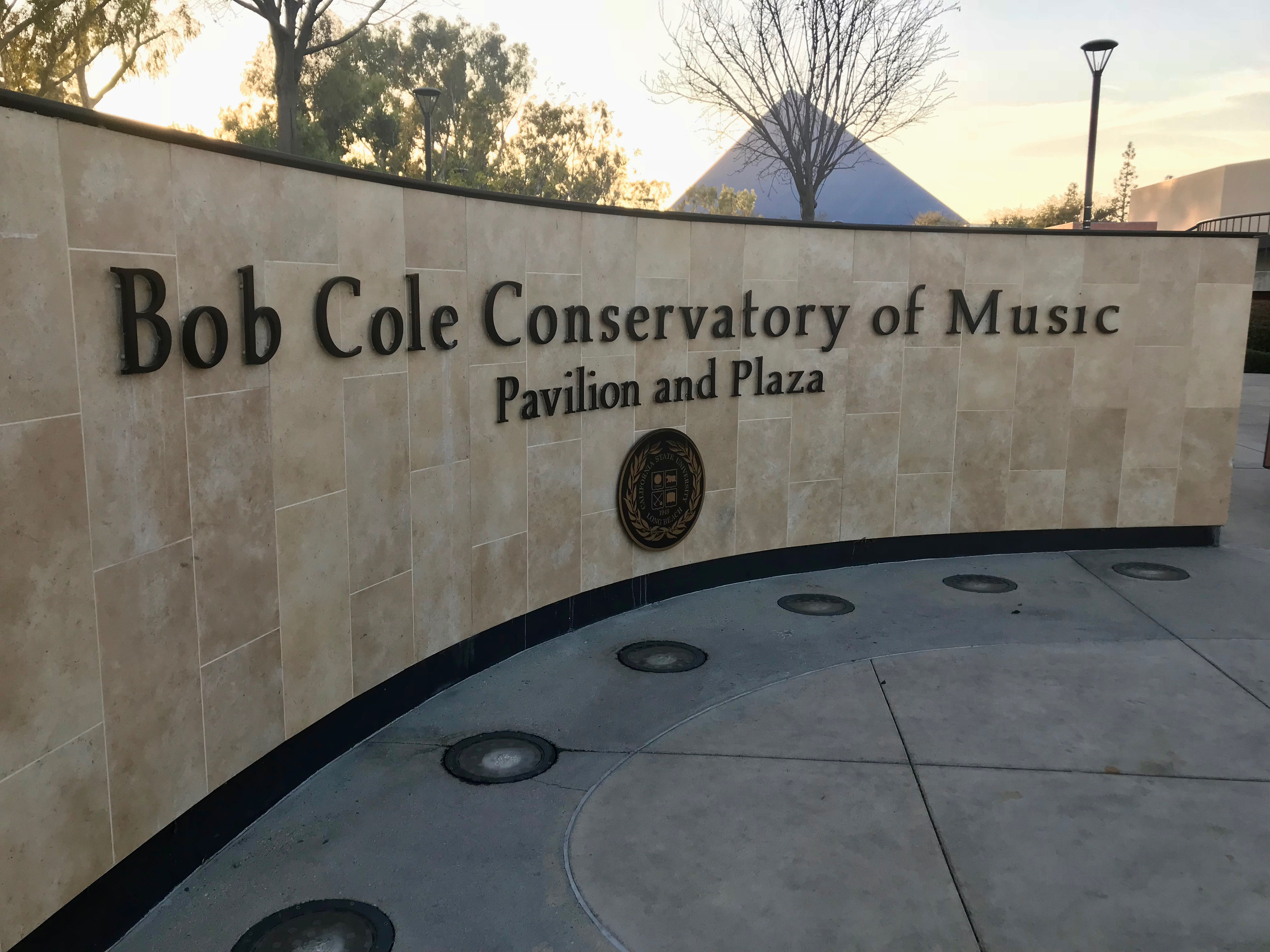
- Entrance to the Bob Cole Conservatory
- Former name: Department of Music
- Motto: "Music in the Real World"
- Type: Conservatory
- Parent institution: California State University, Long Beach
- Director: Jermie Arnold
- Location: Long Beach, California, United States
- Website: www.csulb.edu/coleconservatory
- Location within the Los Angeles metropolitan area

The Bob Cole Conservatory of Music is the school of music at California State University, Long Beach. In March 2008, the music department was renamed the Bob Cole Conservatory of Music in honor of an endowment gift of $16.4 million from the estate of Robert "Bob" Cole. Cole, a Long Beach real estate investor, long-time music lover, and amateur pianist, died in 2004. Following its disbursement, the gift will benefit the students of the conservatory in the form of scholarships and other awards.

== Areas of study ==
Undergraduates completing courses of study at the Bob Cole Conservatory of Music are awarded the Bachelor of Arts or Bachelor of Music; graduate students stand to receive the Master of Arts or Master of Music. The following courses of study are available to students at both the undergraduate and graduate levels:

- General music (BA only)
- Strings
- Woodwinds
- Brass
- Percussion
- Piano
- Voice
- Composition
- Jazz Performance
- Conducting (MM only)
- Music education
- Musicology

== Notable faculty ==
- Ted Atkatz - founder of and frontman for the Los Angeles-based alternative rock group NYCO and a former principal percussionist for the Chicago Symphony Orchestra (CSO).
- Shun-Lin Chou - a concert pianist and pedagogue who has appeared internationally in concerto, solo, and chamber performances.
- John Barcellona - Director of Woodwind Studies and Professor of Flute at BCCM, and flutist with the internationally acclaimed Westwood Wind Quintet (recordings on Columbia, Crystal, and Western International Music).
- Ron Eschete - is an American seven-string jazz guitarist and has been a sideman to many jazz headliners.
- David Garrett - a cellist, he is a member of the Los Angeles Philharmonic and was previously a member of the Houston Symphony, Assistant Principal of the San Antonio Symphony, and member of the New Orleans Philharmonic. Garrett also appears frequently as recitalist, chamber musician, and soloist, receiving popular and critical acclaim.
- Kye Palmer - a trumpet player who is a Los Angeles studio musician, most notable as a former member of The Tonight Show Band from 2006 to 2009.
- John Proulx - a jazz pianist, vocalist, and Grammy Award-winning composer in Los Angeles, California. His singing style has elicited comparisons with a young Chet Baker.
- Bill Reichenbach Jr. - is an American jazz trombonist and composer. He is the son of Bill Reichenbach who was the drummer for Charlie Byrd from 1962 to 1973. He is best known as a session musician for television, films, cartoons, and commercials. He also recorded a solo CD, "Special Edition", where he is featured on tenor as well as bass trombone.
- Raymond Torres-Santos - is a composer and conductor, and pianist, arranger, and producer of both classical and popular music. He was described as the most versatile Puerto Rican composer active in the 21st century by Malena Kuss in her book, Music in Latin America and the Caribbean: an Encyclopedic History.
- John Van Houten - is an American orchestral tuba player. He is most notable for playing in various film soundtracks.
- Chad Wackerman - is a jazz, jazz fusion and rock drummer, arguably best known as a drummer and percussionist in Frank Zappa's band, but also known for his work with Allan Holdsworth and others. In addition, he has worked with others as a band member, session musician, sideman, and bandleader of his own jazz trio, as well as his solo career.

== Notable alumni ==
- John Barcellona - flutist of the internationally acclaimed Westwood Wind Quintet.
- Samuel Grodin - is an American pianist, lecturer and public speaker. Grodin has shared the stage with Emanuel Ax, Blanca Uribe, Dominique Weber, and Stephen Hough in collaborative performances and master classes.
- Andrew Balogh - is an American saxophonist, composer and music producer. He contributed to the rapper Gunplay's favorably acclaimed album Living Legend and The Strokes drummer Fabrizio Moretti's album Little Joy.
- VJ Rosales - is an American vocalist who performs with the vocal group Filharmonic. With the Filharmonic, he has shared the stage with sharing the stage with Linkin Park, Black Eyed Peas and Pentatonix and made appearances on NBC's "Sing Off" and Pitch-Perfect 2.
- Wayne Bergeron - is an American jazz musician and trumpet player who rose to fame in the mid-1980s after playing lead trumpet in Maynard Ferguson's band.
- Tom Kubis - is a jazz composer/arranger, woodwind player, recording artist, band leader.
- Andy Martin - is an American virtuoso jazz trombonist. Among other acts, he is a member of Gordon Goodwin's Big Phat Band and the Bill Holman big band. He has played in over 100 movies, including the trombone solo in the opening credits of Monsters, Inc..
- Garrett List - is an American trombonist, vocalist and composer.
- Eugene Corporon - is an American conductor, known for his work with wind ensembles and is a scholar of wind/band music repertoire.
- John Patitucci - is an American jazz double bass and jazz fusion electric bass player.
- Basil Poledouris - was an American music composer who concentrated on the scores for films and television shows. Poledouris won the Emmy Award for Best Musical Score for work on part four of the TV miniseries Lonesome Dove in 1989. He is best known for scores such as Conan the Barbarian (1982), RoboCop (1987), Spellbinder (1988), The Hunt for Red October (1990), RoboCop 3 andStarship Troopers (1997).
- Alan Baer - is an American tubist who is Principal Tuba for the New York Philharmonic. He has also been principal tuba with several other orchestras including the Milwaukee Symphony Orchestra, and Louisiana Philharmonic Orchestra.
- Jeff Kashiwa - is a jazz saxophonist native to Seattle who became known on the music scene in 1989 as a member of popular fusion jazz group The Rippingtons.
- Richard and Karen Carpenter, a.k.a. The Carpenters - were an American vocal and instrumental duo consisting of siblings Karen and Richard Carpenter. Producing a distinctively soft musical style, they became among the best-selling music artists of all time.
- Arleen Auger - was an American soprano, admired for her coloratura voice and interpretations of works by Bach, Handel, Haydn, Monteverdi, Gluck, and Mozart.
- John Hollenbeck - is a jazz drummer and composer from Binghamton, NY, USA. He also has interests in classical music, and other musical forms. He is linked to free jazz and avant-garde forms of jazz. He is best known for The Claudia Quintet and his work with trombonist Bob Brookmeyer.
- Jane Ring Frank - is a female American Choral Conductor who leads music publisher E.C. Schirmer's Philovox Recording Chorus.
- Jo-Michael Scheibe - chairs the Thornton School of Music’s Department of Choral and Sacred Music at the University of Southern California, where he conducts the USC Chamber Singers, teaches choral conducting and choral methods, and supervises the graduate and undergraduate choral program.
- Genevieve Artadi - Half of the indie-electronica duo KNOWER and has performed with artists such as Snarky Puppy and Nataly Dawn.
- Marc Mumcian - is an American bassist who played professionally with Slow Gherkin, Jeff Clayton and Kenny Garret the Golden State Pops Orchestra.
