= Oppenheimer (soundtrack) =

2023 soundtrack album by Ludwig Göransson

Oppenheimer (Original Motion Picture Soundtrack)

Soundtrack album by Ludwig Göransson
- Released: July 21, 2023
- Recorded: 2022
- Studios: Eastwood Scoring Stage, Burbank, California
- Genres: Orchestral; contemporary classical; film score
- Length: 94:42
- Label: Back Lot
- Producer: Ludwig Göransson

Ludwig Göransson film score chronology
Black Panther: Wakanda Forever (Original Score) (2022)	Oppenheimer (Original Motion Picture Soundtrack) (2023)	Sinners (Original Motion Picture Score) (2025)

Oppenheimer (Original Motion Picture Soundtrack) is the soundtrack album composed by Ludwig Göransson for the 2023 film Oppenheimer by Christopher Nolan. It was digitally released by Back Lot Music on July 21, 2023, the same day as the film's theatrical release in the United States. At the 66th Annual Grammy Awards, it won Best Score Soundtrack For Visual Media. At the 96th Academy Awards, it won Best Original Score.

== Background ==
On October 8, 2021, Universal Pictures announced production on Oppenheimer and confirmed that composer Ludwig Göransson would be scoring the film. Göransson had previously worked with director Christopher Nolan, scoring Nolan's 2020 film Tenet.

Göransson's score was featured in a trailer for the film on May 8, 2023. It was also featured in the Universal Pictures exclusive five-minute Opening Look on July 13.

== Production ==
=== Development ===
When approached to score Oppenheimer, Göransson was initially intimidated by the scope and magnitude of the project. In the film's early stages of production, Nolan shared the script with his visual effects supervisor Andrew Jackson as he needed to convey phenomena such as quantum mechanics and nuclear reactions onscreen. The visual effects team began creating experimental footage of particles, waves, and chain reactions. Nolan then showed this footage to Göransson, who used it to draw inspiration for his score.

Scoring Oppenheimer proved to be a unique challenge for Göransson as he had never composed a soundtrack that only represented one character's inner workings and point of view. He later explained, "The movie is about [J. Robert] Oppenheimer's perspective; the audience is meant to feel what he's feeling, to see what he's seeing, to be inside of him. That’s what the music needed to do — it needed to get the audience to feel all of his feelings as you see on screen."

Nolan did not give specific direction on how he wanted the score to sound; the only suggestion he gave Göransson was to represent Oppenheimer's character and the film's main theme with a solo violin. Nolan explained, "There's a tension to the sound in a way that I think fits the highly-strung intellect and emotion of Robert Oppenheimer very well." Using the violin as a starting point, Göransson and his wife Serena, a violinist, began experimenting with vibratos and microtonal glissandos; they aimed to convey the anxiety of Oppenheimer through the violin's ability to instantly switch from a romantic and sentimental sound to something "neurotic" and "horrifying."

For the "Can You Hear the Music" sequence, Nolan wanted a piece that would emulate Igor Stravinsky's The Rite of Spring, which he called "one of the best pieces of music ever written." Early in production, Nolan and Göransson attended a performance of The Rite of Spring by the Los Angeles Philharmonic.

=== Composition ===
Göransson's score comprises three overarching movements: Oppenheimer's background in physics, the Manhattan Project, and the Atomic Energy Commission hearing. The score begins with lush melodies by strings, harps, and piano as Oppenheimer explores theory and begins his career as a physicist. The core of Oppenheimer's theme is a hexatonic scale that can be heard as a leitmotif throughout the film, beginning in the piece "Can You Hear the Music". As the score transitions into the second movement, the tone shifts as the atomic bomb is being built, with the increased stakes being amplified by thumping bass and metallic ticking sounds. Göransson was careful not to veer his score toward sounding "booming," especially in the film's second act, as he believed that if the score was too explosive, the detonations in the film wouldn't have as much of an impact on the audience.

Before [the second act], it's just theories, it's just scribble-downs, it's just ideas. But then when there's an actual physical bomb, you take a crazy big tonal shift and just channel that with those synths, with the impending doom. You have that thumping bass and then there's this metallic ticking sound, and that ode is up until the bomb goes off, and then you have these moments of silence, which I think is very effective.

— Ludwig Göransson

While the film is a period piece and Göransson did use instrumentation that fit with the times, he also wanted the score to feel "timeless," choosing to infuse the traditional orchestra with synthesizers and mono-production. He and Nolan also chose not to include drums in the score at the risk of it feeling militaristic, instead incorporating percussive elements such as foot stomping, ticking, and Geiger counter static. During the nuclear reactor sequence, Göransson had the cellists play col legno, striking the strings with the stick of their bow to create a percussive sound.

In addition to its instrumentation, Göransson conveyed the energy of the film through the score's tempo. In the piece "Can You Hear the Music", he employed 21 tempo changes—a large feat for a live orchestra. Originally, Göransson called it "unplayable" and planned to record the song bar-by-bar, but his wife encouraged him to record the song in one take. After much experimentation, the music team achieved this by playing a click into the musicians' headphones before every tempo change. This piece alone took three days to record.

In the end, we recorded music that surpassed what I believed to be humanly possible. The perplexing visuals of spinning atoms drove forty violins into a breathtaking frenzy, while courtroom scenes were scored with the intensity of a battlefield. The music’s extreme dynamic shifts, travelling from the depths of an intimately personal journey to the brink of utter destruction, are drastic, disorientating, and jarring.

— Ludwig Göransson

=== Recording ===
Unlike most cases when scoring begins in post-production, Göransson began attending weekly meetings three months before filming began, writing 10 minutes of music a week for Nolan. Göransson described the process as very "collaborative and open." Nolan was then able to begin filming with two to three hours of music that he could reference. Additionally, when editing began in post-production, Nolan and editor Jennifer Lame were able to use Göransson's preliminary work for the first cut of the film without the need for a temp score. Every Friday during the editing process, Göransson would screen the film with Nolan and Lame, and then tweak his score accordingly. The score took Göransson approximately nine months to complete.

The final score was performed by the Hollywood Studio Orchestra and recorded over five days at the scoring stage at Warner Bros. Studios. At its peak, the orchestra included 40 string players, eight horns, three trombones, three trumpets, one tuba, and one harp.

== Release and commercial reception ==
The soundtrack was released for streaming and digital download on July 21, 2023. By January 2024, the soundtrack garnered over 200 million streams. In particular, the track "Can You Hear the Music" went viral on TikTok, earning 2.1 billion impressions on the app and over 60 million streams across all music streaming platforms.

The soundtrack was released in both CD and LP formats by Mondo in September 2023.

== Critical reception ==
Justin Chang of the Los Angeles Times called the score "magnificent", while Robbie Collin of The Telegraph called it "gorgeously relentless". Wendy Ide of The Observer called Göransson's score "masterful and mercurial, surely one of the finest of the year." David Rooney of The Hollywood Reporter wrote, "Aiding immeasurably in Nolan’s unfaltering control of tone and tension is ... Ludwig Göransson’s extraordinarily forceful, almost wall-to-wall score."

Ross Bonaime of Collider extended great praise to Göransson, stating that "Oppenheimer's ever-present score by Ludwig Göransson accompanies nearly every moment of the film, knowing exactly when to pull back, or when to provoke the audience with the sounds of a ticking clock or static underneath the onslaught of an orchestra fully enveloping the viewer in sound. Nolan and [Hoyte] van Hoytema's visuals are always impressive, but it's Göransson's score that takes Oppenheimer to another level, and continues to prove that he's one of the most exciting composers working in film today."

On the contrary, some film critics felt that the score was overbearing. Odie Henderson of The Boston Globe called the score "grating" and stated that "[Nolan's] penchant for drowning out necessary dialogue [became] intolerable" when the score was used. Fred Topel of UPI wrote that "Ludwig Göransson wrote a good score, but the constant use of it is exhausting." Oli Welsh of Polygon echoed these sentiments, noting that the score was "overused."

== Live performances ==
To promote the soundtrack ahead of the 2024 awards season, Universal and Syncopy Inc. presented Oppenheimer: Live in Concert, a live-to-film concert experience featuring a 55-piece orchestra under the direction of Göransson, and conducted by Anthony Parnther. The concert was held at the University of California, Los Angeles's Royce Hall on January 10, 2024, and included an introduction by Nolan and actor Cillian Murphy. The concert was attended by 1,000 people.

== Accolades ==
Oppenheimer (Original Motion Picture Soundtrack) awards and nominations
Award	Year (Note: Indicates the year of ceremony. Each year is linked to the article about the awards held that year, wherever possible.)	Category	Recipients	Result	Ref.
Hollywood Music in Media Awards	2023	Best Original Score in a Feature Film	Ludwig Göransson	Nominated	
St. Louis Film Critics Association Awards	2023	Best Score	Ludwig Göransson	Won	
Washington D.C. Area Film Critics Association Awards	2023	Best Score	Ludwig Göransson	Won	
Chicago Film Critics Association Awards	2023	Best Original Score	Ludwig Göransson	Nominated	
Dallas–Fort Worth Film Critics Association Awards	2023	Best Musical Score	Ludwig Göransson	Runner-up	
Florida Film Critics Circle Awards	2023	Best Score	Ludwig Göransson	Nominated	
Astra Film Awards	2024	Best Score	Ludwig Göransson	Won	
Golden Globe Awards	2024	Best Original Score	Ludwig Göransson	Won	
Critics' Choice Movie Awards	2024	Best Score	Ludwig Göransson	Won	
Online Film Critics Society Awards	2024	Best Original Score	Ludwig Göransson	Won	
Grammy Awards	2024	Best Score Soundtrack For Visual Media	Ludwig Göransson	Won	
Grammy Awards	2024	Best Arrangement, Instrumental or A Cappella	"Can You Hear the Music" (Ludwig Göransson)	Nominated	
Grammy Awards	2024	Best Instrumental Composition	"Can You Hear the Music" (Ludwig Göransson)	Nominated	
Society of Composers & Lyricists Awards	2024	Outstanding Original Score for a Studio Film	Ludwig Göransson	Won	
British Academy Film Awards	2024	Best Original Score	Ludwig Göransson	Won	
Satellite Awards	2024	Best Original Score	Ludwig Göransson	Nominated	
Academy Awards	2024	Best Original Score	Ludwig Göransson	Won	

== Track listing ==
Oppenheimer (Original Motion Picture Soundtrack) track listing
No.	Title	Length
1.	"Fission"	4:38
2.	"Can You Hear the Music"	1:50
3.	"A Lowly Shoe Salesman"	3:34
4.	"Quantum Mechanics"	3:00
5.	"Gravity Swallows Light"	3:30
6.	"Meeting Kitty"	5:47
7.	"Groves"	3:03
8.	"Manhattan Project"	3:01
9.	"American Prometheus"	2:37
10.	"Atmospheric Ignition"	3:28
11.	"Los Alamos"	2:38
12.	"Fusion"	3:55
13.	"Colonel Pash"	4:57
14.	"Theorists"	3:14
15.	"Ground Zero"	4:21
16.	"Trinity"	7:52
17.	"What We Have Done"	5:45
18.	"Power Stays in the Shadows"	4:10
19.	"The Trial"	5:32
20.	"Dr. Hill"	4:23
21.	"Kitty Comes to Testify"	4:52
22.	"Something More Important"	3:25
23.	"Destroyer of Worlds"	2:54
24.	"Oppenheimer"	2:16
Total length:		94:42

== Personnel ==
Credits adapted from LP liner notes.

All music composed by Ludwig Göransson

- Ludwig Göransson – producer
- Christopher Nolan – executive producer
- Colby Donaldson – assistant mix engineer
- Max Sandler – score technical engineer
- Patricia Sullivan – mastering
- Amanda Goodpaster – editing
- Thomas Kotcheff – additional writing (16, 22), orchestration
- Anthony Parnther – conductor
- Chris Fogel – recording, mixing
- Ngawang C. Samphel – arranging
- Cara Bateman – transcription
- Monica Sonand – supervisor
- Eric Wegener – score editor
- Daniel Gold – music librarian
- Mo Shafeek – art direction

== Charts ==
Chart performance for Oppenheimer (Original Motion Picture Soundtrack)
Chart (2023)	Peak position
Belgian Albums (Ultratop Flanders)	156
Belgian Albums (Ultratop Wallonia)	141
Swiss Albums (Schweizer Hitparade)	53
UK Independent Albums (Official Charts)	42
UK Soundtrack Albums (Official Charts)	5

== Release history ==
Release history and formats for Oppenheimer (Original Motion Picture Soundtrack)
Region	Date	Format(s)	Label(s)	Ref.
Various	July 21, 2023	Digital download; streaming	Back Lot Music	
United States	September 2023	CD; LP (3xLP)	Back Lot Music	
