= Benjamin N. Cardozo High School =

Public school in New York City

Location
- 57-00 223rd St; Bayside, Queens, New York 11364; United States; 40°45′6.13″N 73°45′23.50″W

Information
- Type: Public
- Established: 1967; 59 years ago
- School district: New York City Department of Education
- NCES School ID: 360009901919
- Principal: Meagan Colby
- Teaching staff: 187.17 (on an FTE basis)
- Grades: 9-12
- Enrollment: 3,100 (2022-2023)
- Student to teacher ratio: 16.56
- Campus: City: Large
- Colors: Navy Blue and Orange
- Mascot: Judges
- Nickname: 'Dozo
- Newspaper: The Verdict
- Yearbook: Nexus
- Website: www.cardozohigh.com

Benjamin N. Cardozo High School is a public high school in the Bayside neighborhood of Queens, New York City. The school was named for Benjamin N. Cardozo, who served as justice of the U.S. Supreme Court and chief judge of the New York Court of Appeals. It is operated by the New York City Department of Education.

Cardozo High School is known for its Mentor Law and Humanities program, offering classes in such subjects as criminal justice, contract law, constitutional law, homeland security, along with a legal internship course. The school's Da Vinci Science and Research Institute program provides students with an emphasis on science and mathematics. The Performing Dance program, for which students are selected through an audition process, provides instruction in many forms of dance.

The school also has a wide variety of extracurricular clubs, Navy JROTC, activities, and athletic and academic teams.

== Academics ==
Cardozo High School offers a wide variety of Honors and Advanced Placement Courses, including, but not limited to, AP English Language and Composition, AP English Literature and Composition, AP Spanish Language and Culture, AP Biology, AP Chemistry, AP Physics 1, AP Psychology, AP Environmental Science, AP Statistics, AP Computer Science A, AP Computer Science Principles, AP Calculus AB, AP Calculus BC, AP U.S. History, AP World History, AP European History, AP U.S. Government and Politics, AP Comparative Government and Politics, AP Macroeconomics, and AP Microeconomics. In addition, Cardozo High School also offers dual-enrollment courses with St. John's University in United States History, United States Government, Introductory Journalism, College Writing, and American Literature through their College Advantage Program. Cardozo High School also offers college-credit bearing classes via its College Now partnerships with Queensborough Community College and Queens College.

== Extracurricular activities ==
=== Robotics ===
Benjamin N. Cardozo High School has an extracurricular robotics program, led by coach and lead mentor Bernard Haggerty. Founded in 2014, The Sentinels have participated in robotics programs and have won numerous awards. The program is entirely student-funded through fundraising efforts and a marketing division responsible for organizing larger fundraising events and attracting sponsors from businesses and colleges.

The program consists of five core engineering divisions and three marketing and media divisions. Students are taught hands-on mechanical, electrical, and pneumatic engineering as well as computer science and computer aided design. The marketing and media divisions are responsible for organizing team events and fundraisers, budgeting, sponsor outreach, managing a team blog and newsletter, and creating teaser, reveal, and recruitment videos for the season.

A Mentorship program was created in 2017, allowing alumni to return as volunteers or mentors. The program provides access to a number of scholarships, volunteer opportunities, and internship connections through FIRST, the U.S. Navy, and the school's PTA.

==== FIRST® Robotics Program ====
The school has a FIRST® Robotics Team founded in 2014, (FRC Team #5599, The Sentinels).

In 2014, the team was awarded the Future Glory Award at the Brunswick Eruption 2014 off-season competition. In 2015, the team took home the Rookie Inspiration Award from the New York City 2015 Regional Competition. In 2017, the team was the leading alliance in finals at the Hudson Valley Rally off-season competition in Yonkers, New York. In 2018, the team played in the quarter-finals in the New York City 2018 Regional Competition on an alliance with specialized school Brooklyn Technical High School and Long Island City High School. At the time Vice-Captain and Director of Marketing, Danielle Louie, was a Dean's Lists Award semi-finalist. At the 2019 SBPLI Long Island Regional Competition (#2), Nazifa Prapti was a Dean's List Award semi-finalist, and was also awarded the MVP Achievement in recognition of their "Individual excellence, contribution, and achievement" during the competition season. At the New York City 2019 Regional, Prapti was a Dean's List Award finalist, one of the highest acclaimed awards in the entire FIRST Robotics program. The team placed in the semi-finals during the 2019 Half Hallow Hills Robotics Invitational off-season event.

==== SeaPerch Program ====
The school's robotics team once included an underwater robotics division that participated in the United States Navy's SeaPerch program, a program created by the Massachusetts Institute of Technology and sponsored by Office of Naval Research. The SeaPerch team placed third in the 2017 season, their first time competing in the program. The SeaPerch program was disbanded in 2018.

=== Science Olympiad ===
The school's Science Olympiad team consistently ranks in the top five at the New York City Regional Competition. The team won second place in 2008, third place in 2009, and fourth place in 2010. On February 5, 2011, the school's Science Olympiad team ranked first for the first time since 1999 at the New York City Regional Science Olympiad Competition, ranking above several private and specialized high schools renowned for their academic rigor. In 2012, the team ranked second at the regional competition.

=== Debate ===
The debate team won the NYC championship in 2008.

=== Future Business Leaders of America ===
Cardozo's chapter of FBLA (Future Business Leaders of America) consistently places among the top students/schools on the city-level and on the state level of the competitions in various competitive events such as Marketing, Economics, Personal Finance, Business Math, Cyber Security, Parliamentary Procedures, Networking Concepts, Business Procedures, Hospitality Management, Accounting I, Sports Management, and more. Students place in the top of their competitive events. In 2011, Cardozo FBLA went on to the national level of the competitions in Orlando, Florida.

== Athletics ==
Cardozo also has a large number of acclaimed sports teams, some of which are:

- Boys: Track, Baseball, Football, Basketball, Cross country, Fencing, Golf, Handball, Lacrosse, Soccer, Tennis, and Volleyball.
- Girls: Track, Basketball, Cross country, Fencing, Golf, Gymnastics, Handball, Lacrosse, Soccer, Softball, Stunt (sport), Swimming, Tennis, and Volleyball.
- Co-ed: Bowling and Wrestling.

== Enrollment ==
As of the 2018–2019 school year, enrollment was 3,617 students, and there were 176.89 classroom teachers (based on an FTE basis), for a student–teacher ratio of 20.45:1. There were 1,938 students (54% of enrollment) eligible for free lunch and 310 (9% of students) eligible for reduced-cost lunch.

== History ==
Benjamin N. Cardozo High School opened in 1967 on the former site of Oakland Golf Club. The building was designed by the firm of Eggers & Higgins. It was built for $7.571 million, and it was designed for a capacity of 3,213 students. In 1968, the Queens Chamber of Commerce gave Cardozo High School an award for excellence in design and civic value.

In March 1970, the Black Students Union gave Principal Benjamin Michaelson a list of ten requests. The students wanted Black History and Art to be added to the curriculum, they wanted several racist teachers to be fired, and they wanted to have more input on which classes they took. They also wanted more teachers who were black, as there was only one at that time. The following month, the students held a sit in. A week later, twelve members of the Black Students Union met with Michaelson about the list. When Michaelson tried to postpone the discussion to another time, the students would not allow Michaelson to leave the office and prevented others to enter the room. The principal's assistant called the police, and four students were arrested.

In March 1992, then-presidential candidate Bill Clinton met with Cardozo students to answer questions. He returned in January 1998 and helped paint classrooms in Cardozo, along with many volunteers from Americorps.

Students of the school took to the athletic field in October 2013 to fight cuts to AP science and math classes.

== Notable alumni ==
- Rafer Alston (born 1976), former NBA player
- Julio Arce, (born 1989) mixed martial artist
- Ted Atkatz (born 1976), founder of and frontman for the Los Angeles-based alternative rock group NYCO
- Dawoud Bey (born David Smikle; 1953), photographer, writer and curator
- Duane Causwell (born 1968), NBA player
- Jeremy Cushman (born 1990), violinist and violist
- Josue De Paula (born 2005), MLB baseball outfielder
- Leila Grey (Catherine Guzman) (born 1990), professional wrestler
- Darryl Hill (born 1982), professional basketball player
- Royal Ivey (born 1981), NBA player with the Philadelphia 76ers
- Ron Jeremy (born Ronald Hyatt, 1953), adult film actor
- Steve Koren (born 1966), writer/producer and screenwriter for Saturday Night Live, Seinfeld, and Veep
- Rushi Kota (born 1987), actor, known for his role as Prashant in the Netflix show Never Have I Ever and Dr. Vik Roy in Grey's Anatomy
- Dalilah Muhammad (born 1990), track and field athlete who won the gold medal in 400 meters hurdles during the 2016 Summer Olympics
- Pete Munro (born 1975), MLB pitcher who played for the Toronto Blue Jays and Houston Astros
- Jay Pak (Pak Dae-sik) (born 1985), Korean-American rapper and singer. Known by his stage-name, "Flowsik". Contestant on Show Me the Money Season 5.
- Anthony Raneri (born 1982), lead singer and founder of Bayside
- Howie Rose (born 1954), New York Mets broadcaster
- Elissa Shevinsky (born 1979), technology executive, entrepreneur, information security researcher, author
- George Tenet (born 1953), former director of the CIA
- Reginald VelJohnson (born 1952), actor, known for his role as Carl Winslow in Family Matters
- Karen Yu (born 1992), professional wrestler, also known as "Karen Q" and "Wendy Choo"

== Notable faculty ==
- Matthew "Matt Striker" Kaye (born 1974), former social studies teacher who was fired from his job at Benjamin Cardozo after using sick time to work as a professional wrestler.
