= Synthestration =

Synthestration is the art of composing music in the form of a MIDI mockup. A mockup is an extensive demo of a musical recording, for playback by computers triggering virtual instrument software or hardware, to emulate an orchestral recording.

The process involves inputting notes into a computer sequencing program as MIDI data, which then produces those tones via virtual instrument software/hardware. This is followed by significant programming in order to realistically mimic the ensemble playing of an orchestra.

The term is a combination of the words 'synth(esizer)' and 'orchestration'.

"Synthestrated" mockups are frequently used in projects requiring large budgets to record, such as film scores. A mockup allows the director, or producer, to hear the compositions in a setting that approximates their final version, allowing them to approve or alter the project before the budget has been committed to record live musicians. However, because the replication of acoustic instruments has progressed steadily, MIDI mockups are occasionally utilized in the final score on films, in cases where time has run out, or due to budget constraints. For big-budget films, mockups are eventually converted into an orchestrated score and recorded by a live orchestra.
