= NYCO =

Nyco or NYCO may refer to:

- Nyco Lilliu (born 1987) French singer
- NYCO Imerys, American major producer of wollastonite
- NYCO SA, French manufacturer of synthetic lubricants
- New York City Opera (NYCO)
- National Youth Choir of Scotland (redirect from NYCoS)
- New York City Omnibus Corporation, NYCO routes Fifth and Madison Avenues Line
- NYCO (band)
