= Tigran Arakelyan =

Armenian-American conductor (born 1987)

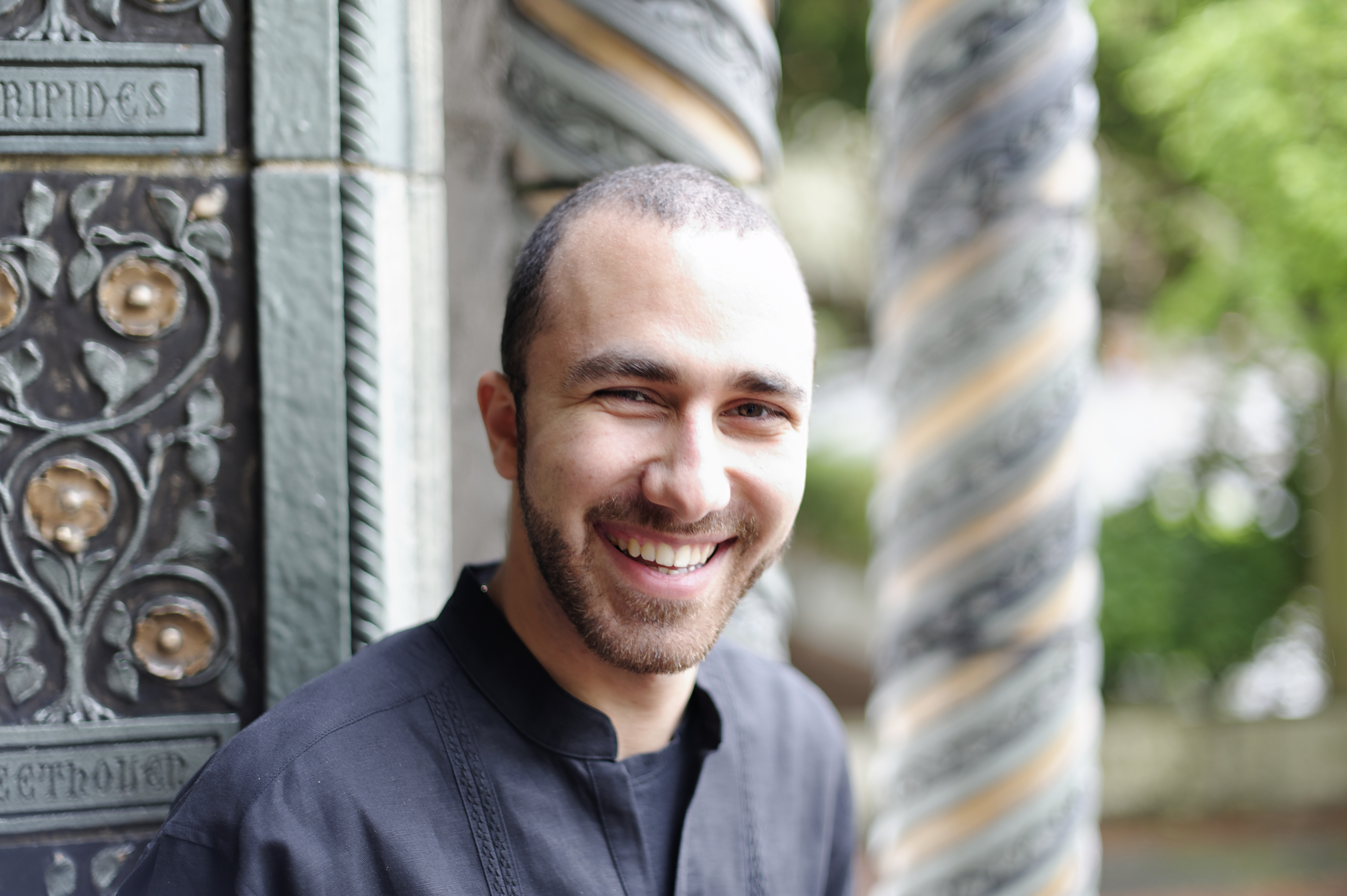
- Born: 1987 (age 38–39)
- Education: University of Washington (DMA), California State University, Northridge (MM)
- Occupation: Conductor
- Website: tigranarakelyan.com

Tigran Arakelyan (born 1987) is an Armenian-American conductor, currently the music director of the Northwest Mahler Festival and Port Townsend Symphony Orchestra. He was named by Musical America in the Top 30 Professionals of the Year and Yamaha Music USA included him in their 40 under 40 honorees.

== Early life and education ==
When he was 11 years old, Arakelyan and his family emigrated from Armenia and settled in Los Angeles, California. He received a M.Mus from California State University, Northridge and received a Doctorate of Musical Arts in conducting from the University of Washington in 2016. His musical studies are with Ludovic Morlot, John Barcellona and Paul Taub. Arakelyan participated in masterclasses and festivals at the Conductors Guild, Pierre Monteux School, Idyllwild Music Festival and the Seattle Flute Society. In masterclasses he has worked with David Effron, Stephen Preston, and others. He played in the Los Angeles Junior Philharmonic Orchestra.

== Career ==
Arakelyan is the music director of the Northwest Mahler Festival and the Port Townsend Symphony Orchestra. Since 2022, Arakelyan is the executive director of Music Works Northwest in Bellevue, Washington.

Arakelyan held conducting positions with the California Philharmonic Orchestra, Los Angeles Youth Orchestra and youth orchestras in Bainbridge Island, Federal Way and Bremerton. He played alongside James Galway and the Los Angeles Philharmonic during Galway's induction to the Hollywood Bowl Hall of Fame. Arakelyan conducted regional premieres by Paul Hindemith, James Cohn, Keith Jarrett and Iosif Andriasov. He is a recipient of awards from The American Prize, Global Music Awards and AGBU Performing Arts Fellowship.

== Podcast ==
Arakelyan has done podcast interviews with George Walker, Christian McBride, Mark O'Connor, Sharon Isbin, Richard Stoltzman, Christopher Theofanidis, Ran Blake, Jaime Martin, Melia Watras, Martin Bresnick, JoAnn Falletta, Kris Kwapis, Alphonso Johnson, Leslie Mándoki, Joseph Young, Wadada Leo Smith, Robert Dick and many others.
