= Grodin =

Grodin is a surname, probably of Scottish origin. It may refer to the following notable people:

- Charles Grodin (1935–2021), American actor, comedian, author, and television talk show host
- Joseph Grodin (1930–2025), American lawyer
- Michael Grodin (born 1951), American professor of bioethics and human rights
- Samuel Grodin (born 1985), American pianist, lecturer and teacher
