= Sarah Gibson (composer) =

American pianist and composer (1986–2024)

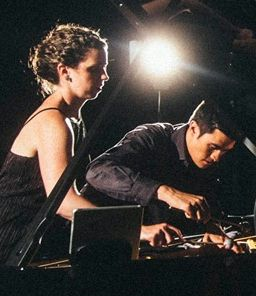
- Hocket duo in 2020
- Born: May 21, 1986; Spartanburg, South Carolina, U.S.
- Died: July 14, 2024 (aged 38); Los Angeles, California, U.S.
- Education: Indiana University School of Music; University of Southern California
- Occupations: Pianist; composer
- Organizations: Hocket
- Spouse: Aaron Fullerton (m. 2014)
- Children: 1
- Website: sarahgibson-music.com

Sarah Elizabeth Gibson (May 21, 1986 – July 14, 2024) was an American pianist and composer. She and pianist and composer Thomas Kotcheff formed a piano duo, Hocket. Her compositions have been performed by major orchestras throughout the United States and in Europe.

== Early life and education ==
Gibson was born in Spartanburg, South Carolina, and was raised by her parents in Roswell, Georgia. She became interested in music at a young age and began piano lessons at the age of seven. As a teenager, she played for the Atlanta Symphony Youth Orchestra as a pianist and principal keyboardist. She studied piano and composition at Indiana University School of Music, graduating in 2008 with a bachelor's degree in piano performance and music composition, and at the University of Southern California, where she earned two degrees in composition: a master's degree in 2010, and a doctorate in 2015.

== Career ==
She worked as assistant director for the Los Angeles Philharmonic Composer Fellowship Program, alongside director Andrew Norman, and as assistant professor of composition theory at the Bob Cole Conservatory of Music of Cal State Long Beach, where she also led the New Music Ensemble.

In 2019, Gibson became a core artist of Piano Spheres, a Los Angeles concert series primarily focused on new piano music. She had participated in the organization for over a decade prior to her appointment. She performed across the U.S. and in Europe. She formed a piano duo, Hocket, with pianist and composer Thomas Kotcheff. They performed at festivals including the MATA Festival in New York City, the Noon to Midnight of the Los Angeles Philharmonic, the Eighth Blackbird Creative Lab, and Other Minds Festival.

As a composer, she received commissions from the League of American Orchestras, the Toulmin Foundation, Tanglewood Music Center, Aspen Music Festival and School and the Seattle Symphony, among others. Her composition to the world for baritone and tongue drum was published by Ries & Erler. She was the Los Angeles Chamber Orchestra's sound investment composer in the 2018/19 season.

Her Piano Concerto for the left hand, premiered with her as the soloist, won the University of Southern California's competition of new orchestral music. Her work soak stain for ensemble was premiered by the Grossman Ensemble in Chicago on May 19, 2023. It was inspired by the art of Helen Frankenthaler. Her composition warp & weft for orchestra, inspired by the art of Miriam Schapiro, was premiered on January 26, 2019, by the Los Angeles Chamber Orchestra conducted by Peter Oundjian. Commissioned by the orchestra's 'Sound Investments' initiative, Gibson composed the score in a collaborative process that incorporated opinions from donors and musicians. It was played also by the BBC Scottish Symphony Orchestra in Glasgow, conducted by Gemma New.

Gibson was working on her new orchestral composition beyond the beyond in the final stage of her life, on commission from the BBC Proms for a scheduled performance in August 2024, but was unable to complete beyond the beyond herself in the wake of her final illness. Kotcheff is to complete beyond the beyond for a scheduled 2025 performance under the rubric of the BBC. At the scheduled August 2024 Prom concert, the BBC Philharmonic and conductor Anja Bihlmaier performed warp & weft instead. Reviewer Nick Boston from bachtrack noted that "there was a sense of momentum pushing through the collage of orchestral effects", and described the work of "complex rhythms" as "full of interest and challenge".

== Personal life and death ==
Gibson married Aaron Fullerton in 2014. The couple had one son.

Gibson died at her home in Los Angeles from colon cancer, on July 14, 2024, at the age of 38.

== Awards and honors ==
Gibson was honored by the American Composers Orchestra Underwood New Music Readings. She received the Victor Herbert Award from the American Society of Composers, Authors and Publishers and the Marion Richter American Music Composition Award of the National Federation of Music Clubs. Her Left-hand Piano Concerto won The University of Southern California's New Music for Orchestra competition. Additionally, she won the composition contest of the Percussive Arts Society.

== List of compositions ==
List of compositions sourced from the composer's website

=== Orchestral ===
- warp & weft (2021) for orchestra
- Painting the Floor (2021) for large orchestra
- to make this mountain taller (2023) for large orchestra
- beyond the beyond (2025) for orchestra (completed by Thomas Kotcheff)

=== Concerto ===
- Can't Never Could (2023) for two pianos and orchestra

=== Large ensemble ===
- pas de deux (2021) for 10 woodwinds and piano
- Soak Stain (2023) for chamber orchestra

=== Chamber ===
- Summer’s Breath (2004) for cello and strings
- Sea Monkey (2010) for cello and marimba
- 10,000 filaments (2010) for flute, viola, piano
- Follow the Crumbs Out of the Woods (2011) for flute, oboe, clarinet, bassoon, horn, piano
- sure baby, mañana (2016) for violin, viola, piano four-hands, trumpet/flugelhorn, tenor sax, trombone
- Outsider (2017) for two pianos and two melodicas
- I prefer living in color (2017) for bass clarinet, violin, viola, cello, percussion, piano
- tiny, tangled world (2018) for violin and viola
- intertwine (2019) for bass clarinet and bassoon
- Whirlpool (2020) for string quartet
- As one who love poetry (2020) for two cellos
- I do not want horses or diamonds (2020) two violins, viola, cello, piano
- She, by Laura Mvula (arr. Sarah Gibson) (2021) for violin, electric guitar, piano, toy piano
- the line of your trajectory (2021) cello, percussion, piano four-hands
- All Ashore (2021) for string quartet
- Heartbreaker (2022) for electric guitar and percussion

=== Vocal ===
- Woven (2011) for soprano, alto flute, cello
- Arsen (2011) for soprano and piano
- Family Recipe for Biscuits (2012) for soprano and double bass
- The Barcelona Inside Me (2016) for mezzo-soprano, horn, piano
- Unread Messages (2020) for soprano and piano four-hands (co-composed with Thomas Kotcheff)
- The Boys Are There (2020) for soprano and double bass
- Breath'd back, again (2021) tenor and piano

=== Solo ===
- You are still here (2020) for solo violin
- Carry (2021) for solo cello

=== Piano ===
- Aria (2014) for toy piano and piano
- The Pepper Tent (2015) for solo piano
- Outsider (2017) for two pianos and two melodicas
- our eyes once watered (2018) for solo piano or piano four-hands
- Every Something (2022) for two prepared pianos
