= Jeremy Cushman =

Jeremy Stein Cushman
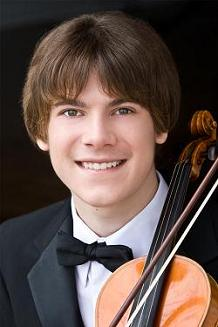

Background information
- Born: December 19, 1990 (age 34); Little Neck, Queens, U.S.
- Genres: Classical music
- Instrument(s): Violin and viola
- Website: jscushman.info

Jeremy Stein Cushman (born December 19, 1990) is an American violinist and violist.

== Music career ==
Cushman made his solo orchestral debut at the age of eight with the Great Neck Philharmonic and, at the age of nine, was featured on the CBS Early Show with Bryant Gumbel after winning the FAO/CBS international talent search. In 2002, he was selected to perform as Microsoft's Symbol of Potential for its annual convention in the New Orleans Superdome. At the age of twelve, Cushman won the 2003 New York City talent competition at Manhattan’s Heckscher Theatre. He also gave two performances at Madison Square Garden for in the Knicks Kids Talent Search semi-finals and finals, where he earned the title of "Most Talented Boy of 2002-2003". Cushman was also performed in Zürich, Switzerland in a benefit performance for UNICEF, performed as a soloist at Lincoln Center's Avery Fisher Hall, and gave a solo recital at New York's Steinway Hall to raise funds for the concert’s sponsor: Variety, the Children's Charity.

Cushman has appeared with a variety of orchestras, including as a guest soloist with the New York Riverside Orchestra, the Queens Symphony Orchestra, the Queensborough Orchestra, the Great Neck Philharmonic, and as a repeat guest soloist with the Nassau Pops Symphony Orchestra. He also toured London and Scotland as concertmaster and soloist of the Children's Orchestra Society's Young Symphonic Ensemble. In April 2006, Cushman won the American Fine Arts Festival young performers competition. In June 2006, he performed the Tchaikovsky Violin Concerto with the Scottsdale Symphony in Scottsdale, Arizona, and in October 2007, he was invited to give a solo recital as part of the Artists Ascending concert series in Memphis, Tennessee. In June 2008, he performed Bruch's Violin Concerto No. 1 in Carnegie Hall with the Young Symphonic Ensemble.

Cushman performed in a special 9/11 memorial ceremony hosted by Secretary General Kofi Annan at the United Nations. In addition, Cushman spent many years as the featured soloist for the Tarumi Violinists, performing in Carnegie Hall, and the White House, at the official New York City and New York State celebrations of Israel's 50th anniversary, and on concert tours of Japan, Taiwan, Argentina and Hong Kong. Cushman began his studies with teacher Yukako Tarumi at the age of five and studied with Juilliard professor Shirley Givens throughout high school.

== Physics ==
Cushman graduated as valedictorian of Benjamin N. Cardozo High School in 2008 and received a B.A. in physics from Harvard College in 2012. He received a M.S. in physics from Yale University in 2012 and is currently a Ph.D. candidate at the same, working on the CUORE Experiment.
