= Long Beach Polytechnic High School =

Public high school in Long Beach, California

Location
- 1600 Atlantic Avenue; Long Beach, California; United States; 33°47′15″N 118°11′02″W

Information
- Type: Public
- Motto: "Home of Scholars & Champions" "Enter to Learn, Go Forth to Serve"
- Established: 1895; 131 years ago
- School district: Long Beach Unified School District
- Principal: Alejandro Vega
- Teaching staff: 168.10 (FTE)
- Grades: 9–12
- Enrollment: 3,954 (2023–24)
- Student to teacher ratio: 23.52
- Campus: Urban
- Colors: Green and gold
- Athletics conference: Moore League
- Team name: Jackrabbits
- Yearbook: Caerulea
- Website: https://poly.lbschools.net

Long Beach Polytechnic High School, founded in 1895 as Long Beach High School, is a four-year public high school located at 1600 Atlantic Avenue in Long Beach, California, United States. The school serves portions of Long Beach, including Bixby Knolls, and some parts of the cities of Signal Hill and Lakewood. Polytechnic (more commonly known as Poly) is the flagship high school of the Long Beach Unified School District. It is a large urban high school with about 4,000 students.

Polytechnic has long been distinguished in both academics and athletics. The PACE (Program of Accelerated Curricular Experiences, founded in 1975 by Dr. Nancy Gray, a teacher and administrator for the Long Beach School system), and the CIC (Center of International Curriculum) magnet programs boast more total University of California admissions than any other high school in California. In 2005, Sports Illustrated magazine named Polytechnic the "Sports School of the Century," in recognition of the school's badminton, baseball, basketball, football, track, cross country, swimming, water polo, volleyball, wrestling, tennis, golf, and softball teams.

Polytechnic has received six Grammy Awards, two of them being "golden signature" Grammy Awards. These awards provide cash to schools to enhance their music programs. Long Beach Poly has sent over 60 football players to the NFL throughout the history of the school. Long Beach Poly was also ranked number one in a list of the best high school athletic programs in the nation by Sports Illustrated.

== History ==
Ethnic composition as of 2020–21
Race and ethnicity	Total
Hispanic or Latino	51.1%
Asian	20.5%
African American	15.6%
Non-Hispanic White/Anglo	7.6%
Other	3.3%
Pacific Islander	1.8%
Native American	0.1%

=== Early years: 1895-1952 ===
Long Beach Polytechnic High School began offering classes in 1895 in order to help educate the growing population of Long Beach. The first classes were at the Methodist Tabernacle Chapel, and the first principal was Walter S. Bailey. The first graduating class was in 1897 and only had one student. During this same year, classes were moved to Chautauqua Hall at Fourth Street and Pine Avenue as work began on the new Long Beach High School. Long Beach High School was completed in 1898 and featured four classrooms and an assembly hall.

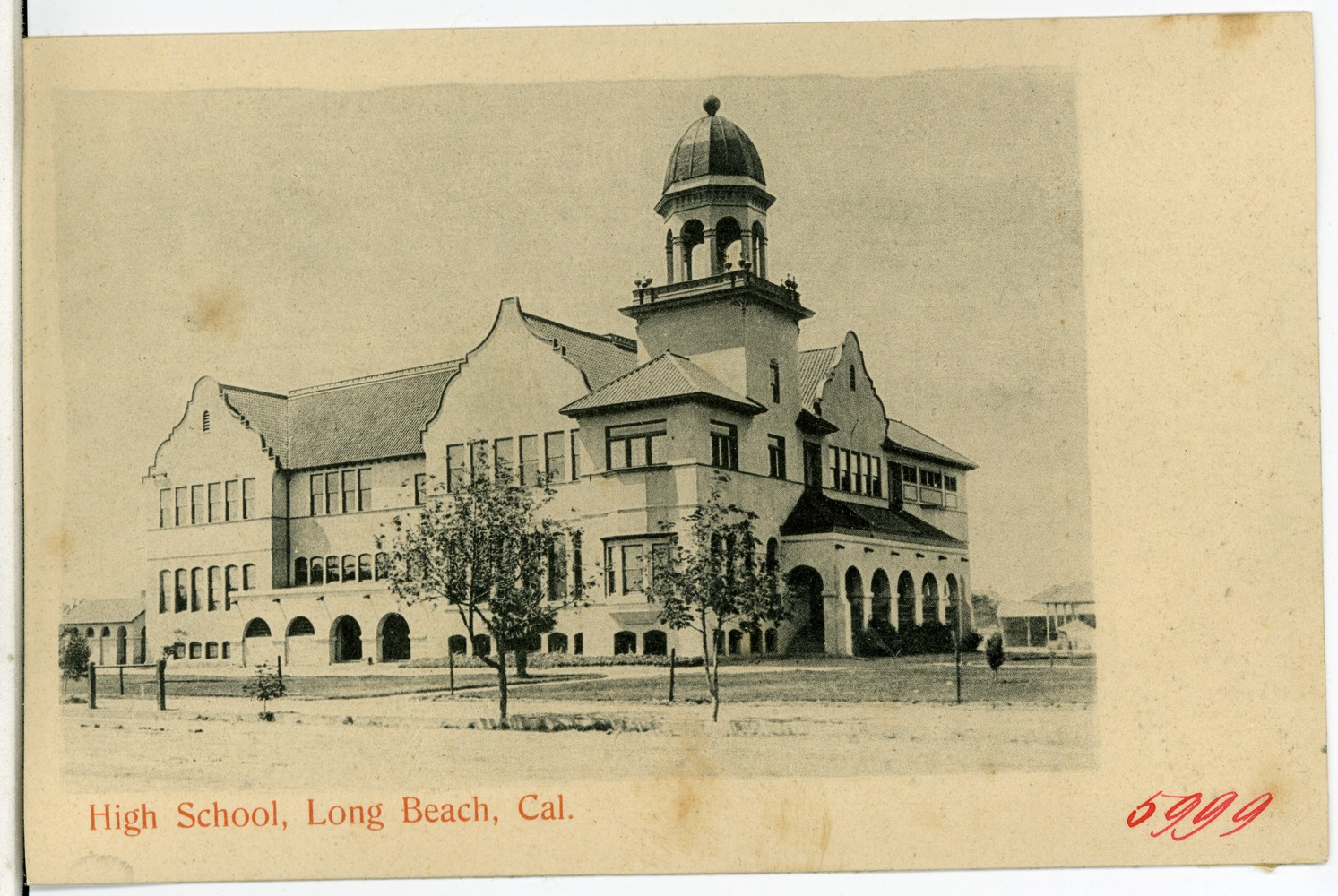
Long Beach High School, at the northwest corner of American Avenue and Eighth Street, 1905

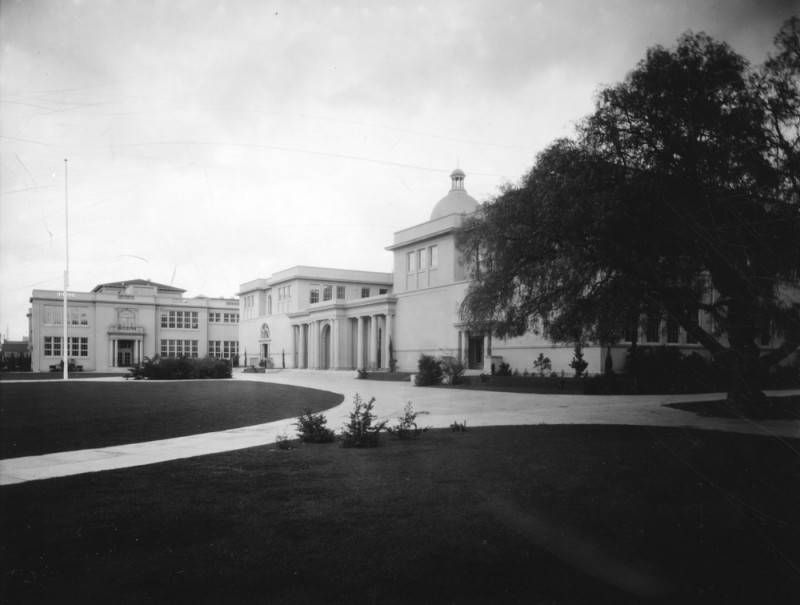
c. 1920s campus at present location, severely damaged by the 1933 Long Beach earthquake

The school's reputation continued to grow. In 1899, the Long Beach High School Athletic Association was formed. In 1903, the school yearbook, Caerulea, was first published. Football and basketball programs were added in 1904, its first student government was established in 1906, David Burcham became the school's long-term principal from 1907 to 1941, and the girls' basketball program won three consecutive state championships, from 1907 to 1909.

In 1911, a new 15 acre campus was constructed at 16th Street and Atlantic, Poly's present location, offering more space and amenities. The new campus was financed by a $240,000 city bond that passed in 1910. The previous campus became an elementary school. JROTC began in 1917, and an influenza epidemic swept through the school population. The following year, rabbits began invading the playing fields, inspiring the track team to call themselves the Jackrabbits; this eventually became the official school mascot. The athletic field was dedicated as "David Burcham Field" in 1924 to honor the long-serving principal.

During much of the 1920s, Poly was the largest high school west of the Mississippi River in terms of student population. A new Mediterranean Revival auditorium was designed by William Horace Austin in 1930, and constructed in 1931. The Long Beach earthquake severely damaged the school in 1933. Following the earthquake, bricks from the damage were sold in order to pay for a memorial flagpole which still stands. In 1935, a new science building was built and the auditorium was remodeled by architect Hugh Davies. The remodeling included PWA Moderne, Streamline Moderne, and Art Deco design. A new administration building was completed the following year.

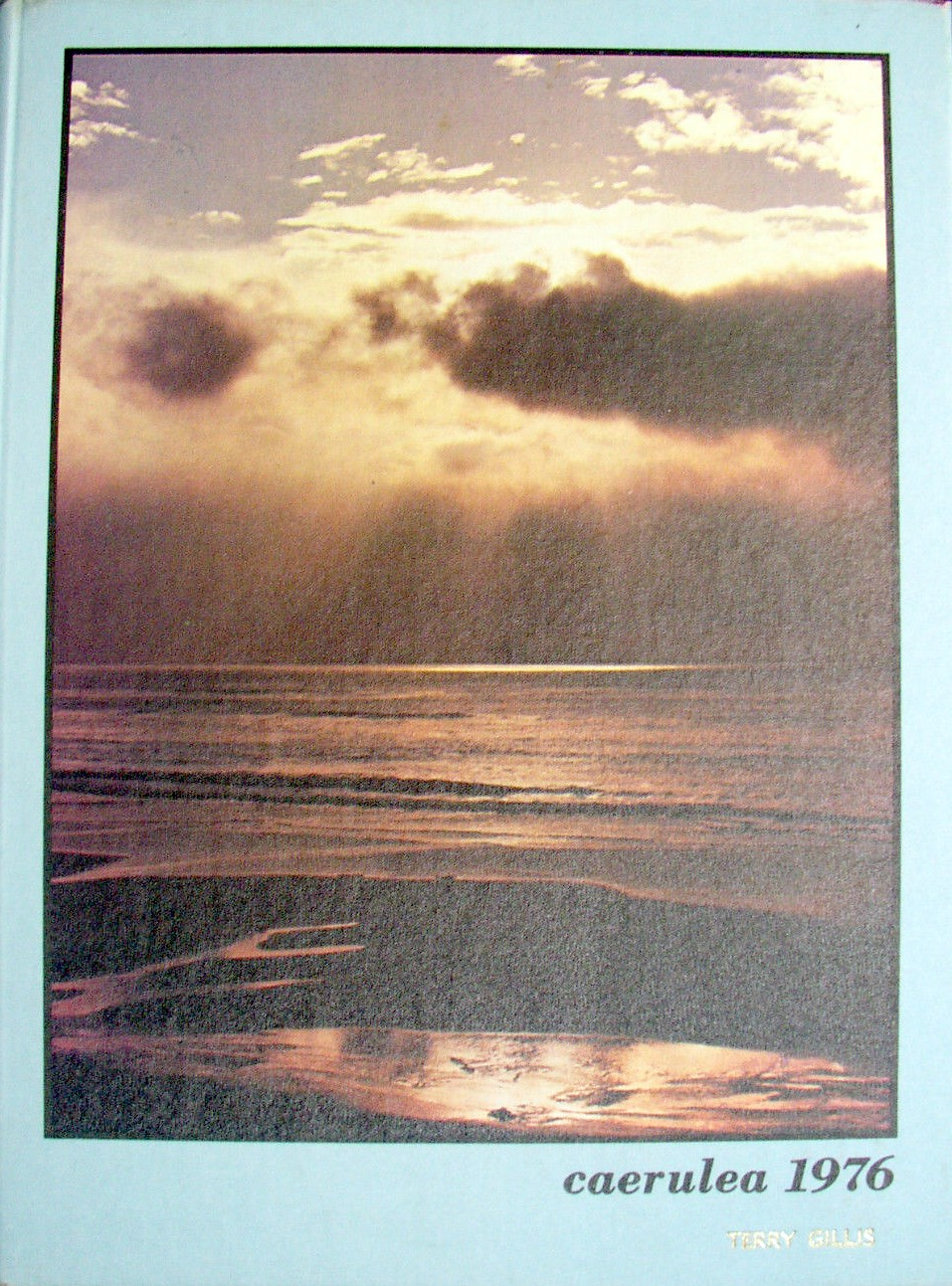
The 1976 edition of the school's Caerulea yearbook

=== 1952–1982 ===
Wooden bleachers that had lined the athletic fields burned down in 1952 and the new Veterans Memorial Stadium became the new home field for the Jackrabbits. The following year, the school's library was completed in 1953.

In 1969, a racist leaflet was published, prompting approximately 100 Euro-American and African-American students to fight, leaving 24 students injured. Homecoming titles (King and Queen) would ended two years later due to racial tensions. In 1975, the Program of Additional Curricular Experiences (PACE) began, one of the first high school programs to offer advanced college placement courses. Badminton began in 1977, and girls' track and gymnastics teams started the following year.

=== 1982–present ===
The Center for International Commerce (CIC) began in 1982. In 1984, Poly was recognized by USA Today as the top ranked school nationally in terms of Moore League, CIF, and state titles. Poly received the Distinguished School Recognition Award in 1986, the California Department of Education's highest award. Poly became a four-year school in 1989, and a new science building was completed in 1993.

The Poly music program was recognized as a Grammy Signature School Gold in 2000, one of the top ten music programs in the country. Poly received this honor in 2003 as well. In 2005, Harvard recognized Poly as the most successful high school in the nation in terms of number of graduates. The same year, Sports Illustrated named the Poly as the #1 sports high school in the nation. In 2006, security was increased and school IDs were required to be worn at all times while on campus. In 2018, Poly dedicated its library to honor former principal Bob Ellis. In 2019, the auditorium was renamed the Andrew Osman Performing Arts Center to honor the school's music program director of 36 years.

== Academics ==
In 2008, 1,573 AP exams were administered at Poly with over 75% of testers receiving a passing score of 3 or higher. The national pass rate in 2008 was slightly over 58%. Poly also has the highest academic performance index of any traditional high school in Long Beach with a 2009 score of 747. It consistently ranks a 9 out of 10 when compared to schools with similar demographics since 2007.

Pac Rim is a California magnet academy for students interested in business. Polytechnic High also includes the Beach, Justice, METS, and MEDS academies. Poly also hosts the PACE program (Program of Additional Curricular Experiences), a competitive college-preparatory magnet program. Entrance is predicated upon a combination of grade-point-average and standardized test scores.

== Athletics ==
Long Beach Polytechnic offers a wide variety of sports and activities due to its large size and diverse student population. Athletic teams compete in Division I within the California Interscholastic Federation and are known as the Jackrabbits. Throughout the school's history, the Jackrabbits have won many state championships and have produced several collegiate and professional athletes. In 2005, Sports Illustrated magazine named Polytechnic the "Sports School of the Century," in recognition of the school's badminton, baseball, basketball, football, track, cross country, swimming, water polo, tennis, golf, and softball teams.

=== Football ===
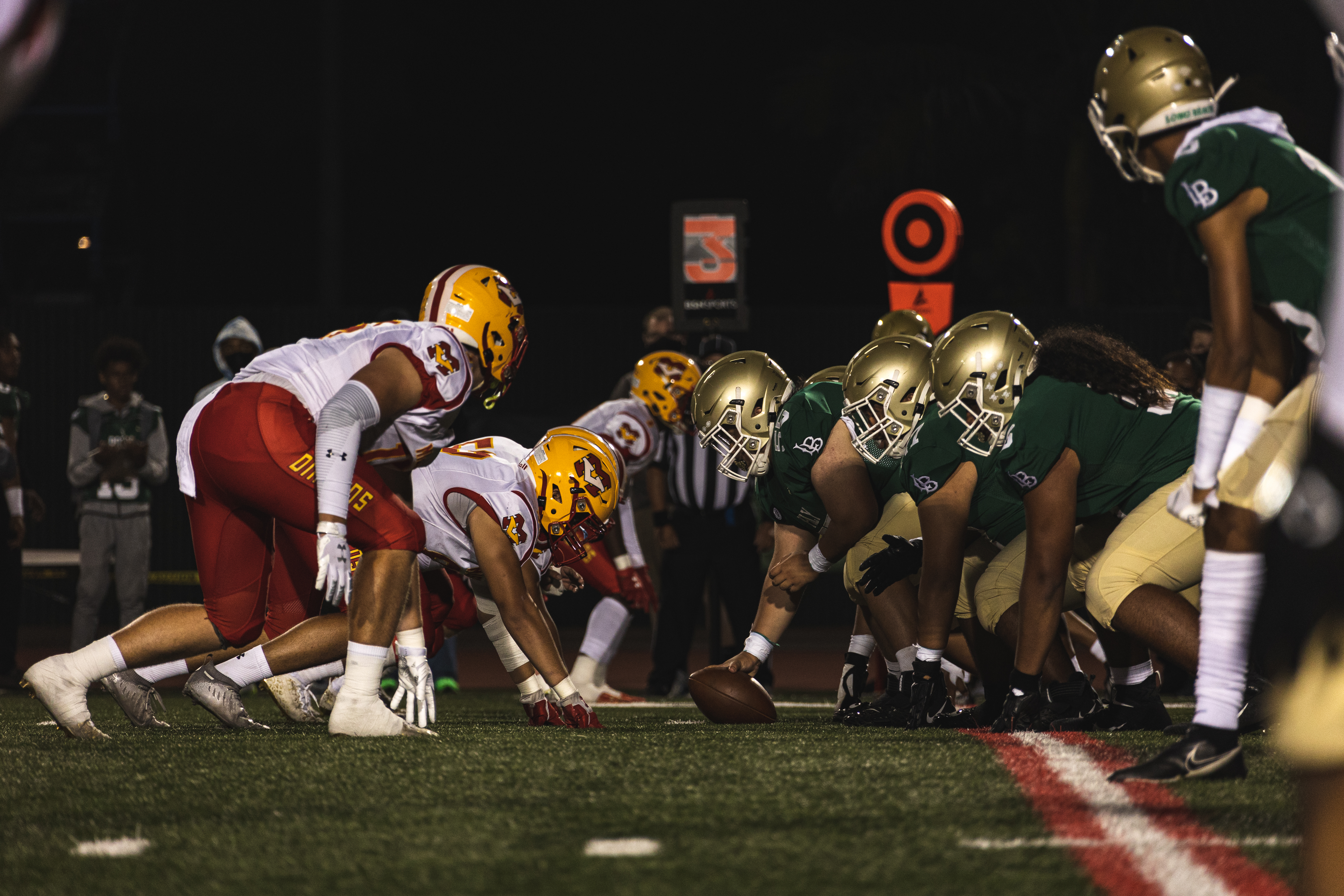
Long Beach Poly (right) lines up before the snap during a 2021 game against Mission Viejo High School at Veterans Memorial Stadium

Long Beach Poly has maintained a successful football program and has produced more NFL players than any other high school in the nation, over 60 throughout school history.

==== Early years ====
Poly played its first football game in 1908 and featured its first African-American player in 1934.

After losing their opener, the Jackrabbits won their first game 10–0 vs. Occidental Prep.

In 1917, head coach Eddie Kienholz left the team to fight in World War I.

The 1919 Poly team went 12–0 and won their first state championship over Berkeley High School by a score of 21–14. Following the state championship, Poly defeated Phoenix High School by a score of 102–0 in the Southwest Championship. Poly won additional CIF titles in 1923 and 1927.

Orian Landreth became the head coach in 1929 and won the CIF title vs. Santa Barbara High School.

Poly repeated as CIF champions in 1930, and also won titles in 1934 and 1936. From 1942 to 1956, the football program experienced down years, producing just four winning seasons. The 1959 and 1960 teams led by quarterback Bud Hollowell went 22–0–1 and claimed two CIF titles.

The 1959 team is best known for the "ICBM" backfield of Lonzo Irvin, Harvey Crow, Willie Brown and Willie Martin.

==== 1960s–present ====
From 1965 to 1979, the Jackrabbits experienced a second drought of success, making the playoffs five times in 15 seasons. The 1973 team went winless and the 1979 team was forced to forfeit all of its wins due to ineligible players. Poly won the CIF title in 1980 and were runners-up in 1981 and 1982. The Jackrabbits shared a title with Edison High School in 1985 after a 14–14 tie.

Poly experienced increased success in the 1990s and 2000s, winning CIF titles in 1997, 1999 and 2000. The 2001 team featured Marcedes Lewis, Hershel Dennis, Winston Justice, and Darnell Bing. Despite the talent, the team finished runner-up to De La Salle High School. The Jackrabbits won the CIF title in 2004 behind DeSean Jackson and won additional titles in 2007, 2008 and 2012.

Former New York Giant Antonio Pierce was hired as head coach before the 2014 season.

==== 4th and Forever ====
A reality television on Current TV, titled 4th and Forever, focuses on the school's strong football program. It has been called the real-life version of Friday Night Lights, but has also been derided as inaccurate and "[relying] on repetitive reality-show conventions".

== Filming location ==
Long Beach Poly has been the backdrop for many commercials, television shows, and films.

- The Craft (1996)
- American Beauty (1999)
- American Pie (1999)
- The Insider (1999)
- The Other Sister (1999)
- Even Stevens (2002) – Episode 3.15, "The Big Splash"
- Simple Plan (2002) – "I'm Just A Kid" music video
- P.O.D. (2003) – "Will You" music video
- Love Don't Cost a Thing (2003)
- MTV's MADE (2004) – Episode 5.1, "Surfing Selena"
- Monster Garage (2004) – Monster Nation 2 1966 Volkswagen Bug / Dune Buggy
- Sleepover (2004)
- Cold Case (2004) – Episode 1.22, "The Plan"
- Juicy Fruit (2005) – "CPR Dummy Steals Gum" commercial
- Coach Carter (2005)
- The New Guy (2002)
- Cold Case (2006) – Episode 3.12, "Detention"
- NCIS (2006) – Episode 3.18, "Bait"
- Paris Hilton (2006) – "Nothing In This World" music video
- Miss/Guided (2007) – pilot episode
- Nancy Drew (2007)
- Mind of Mencia (2007) – "Stereotype Olympics"
- Boston Legal (2007)
- Snoop Dogg's Father Hood (2008)
- Cold Case (2008) – Episode 6.2, "True Calling"
- Fired Up (2009)
- Oreo (2010) commercial
- When the Game Stands Tall (2014)
- Famous Footwear (2015) commercial
- Brian Banks (2019)

== Notable alumni ==
=== Athletes ===
==== Baseball ====
- Charlie Williams, MLB umpire
- Chase Utley
- Chris Gwynn
- Chuck Stevens
- James McDonald
- Jim Marshall, MLB player and manager
- Milton Bradley
- Ollie Brown
- Oscar Brown
- Randy Moffitt
- Rocky Bridges
- Tony Gwynn
- Vern Stephens
- Zeb Terry

==== Basketball ====
- April Phillips
- Ben McDonald
- Bobby Jones
- Jordan Bell
- Joshua Munzon
- Kenny Booker
- Mack Calvin
- Michael Wiley
- Morlon Wiley
- Myles Johnson
- Ozell Jones
- Peyton Watson
- Ryan Anderson
- Tyus Edney

==== Football ====
- Brandon Whiting
- Brian Banks
- Chuckie Miller
- Darnell Bing
- David Howard
- DeSean Jackson
- Earl R. McCullouch
- Gene Washington
- Hershel Dennis
- Iman Marshall
- Isaiah Green
- Jack Jones
- James Burton
- Jamize Olawale
- Jayon Brown
- Jim Lawson
- Johnny Morris
- Josh Love
- JuJu Smith-Schuster
- Jurrell Casey
- Kaelin Clay
- Kareem Kelly
- Ken-Yon Rambo
- Leonard Russell
- Manuel Wright
- Marcedes Lewis
- Mark Carrier
- Marquez Pope
- Matt Corral
- Mike Kellogg
- Omar Stoutmire
- Pago Togafau
- Samie Parker
- Stephone Paige
- Terrence Austin
- Tony Hill
- Willie Brown
- Willie McGinest
- Winston Justice

==== Track and field ====
- Andrea Anderson
- Ariana Washington
- Bryan Woodward
- Bryshon Nellum
- Earl Thomson
- John Rambo
- Martha Watson
- Shalonda Solomon

==== Other sports ====
- Alan Mouchawar, water polo
- Billie Jean King, tennis
- Charles McCallister, medical doctor and Olympic water polo bronze medalist
- Dottie Frazier, diver
- Gary Gabelich, land speed record setter in Blue Flame
- Samantha Larson, mountaineer
- Terry Kennedy, professional skateboarder
- Tom McEwen, drag racer and promoter
- Travis Ramsey, hockey
- Vania King, tennis

=== Entertainers ===
- Barbara Britton, actress
- Bobby Burgess, dancer and singer
- Cameron Diaz, actress
- Carl Weathers, actor
- Crooked I, rapper
- Edna Tichenor, actress
- Giveon, singer
- Gloria Dickson, actress
- Harold Ray Brown, musician, (War)
- Jenni Rivera, singer
- Jo Stafford, singer
- Laraine Day
- Linda Chou, singer
- Lita Ford, musician
- Lupillo Rivera
- Marilyn Horne, opera singer
- Nate Dogg, rapper
- Nick Wiger, writer/podcaster
- Norma Tanega, musician and painter
- Percy Daggs III, actor
- Perry Mattfeld, actress
- Samuel Grodin, pianist
- Sherwood Bailey, child actor in The Little Rascals
- Snoop Dogg, rapper
- Spike Jones, musician
- Thelma Houston, singer
- Van Heflin
- Warren G, Rapper
- Will Glover, musician (The Pyramids)

=== Other alumni ===
- Mildred Bryant Brooks, printmaker, muralist
- Beverly O'Neill, three-term mayor of Long Beach
- Chip Conley, businessman, author and speaker
- Craig Hosmer, eleven-term member of the United States House of Representatives, from 1953 to 1974
- Don Callender, co-founder of Marie Callender's restaurant chain
- Dorothy Buffum Chandler, cultural leader and namesake of the Dorothy Chandler Pavilion, class of 1918
- Edward W. Anderson, Air Force Major General
- Eugene Stoner, firearms designer
- Gerald Desmond, prominent Democratic politician and namesake of the Gerald Desmond Bridge
- Harlan Hagen, seven-term member of the United States House of Representatives, from 1953 to 1967
- Jane Anne Russell, endocrinologist
- Keith Kellogg, acting National Security Advisor
- Robert Dickinson, Emmy-award winning lighting designer
- Samuel Grodin, pianist, lecturer and teacher
- Thad Balkman, District Judge for the 21st judicial district, Cleveland County, Oklahoma
- William Dannemeyer, seven-term member of United States House of Representatives, from 1979 to 1993
