= Thomas Kotcheff =

American composer (born 1988)

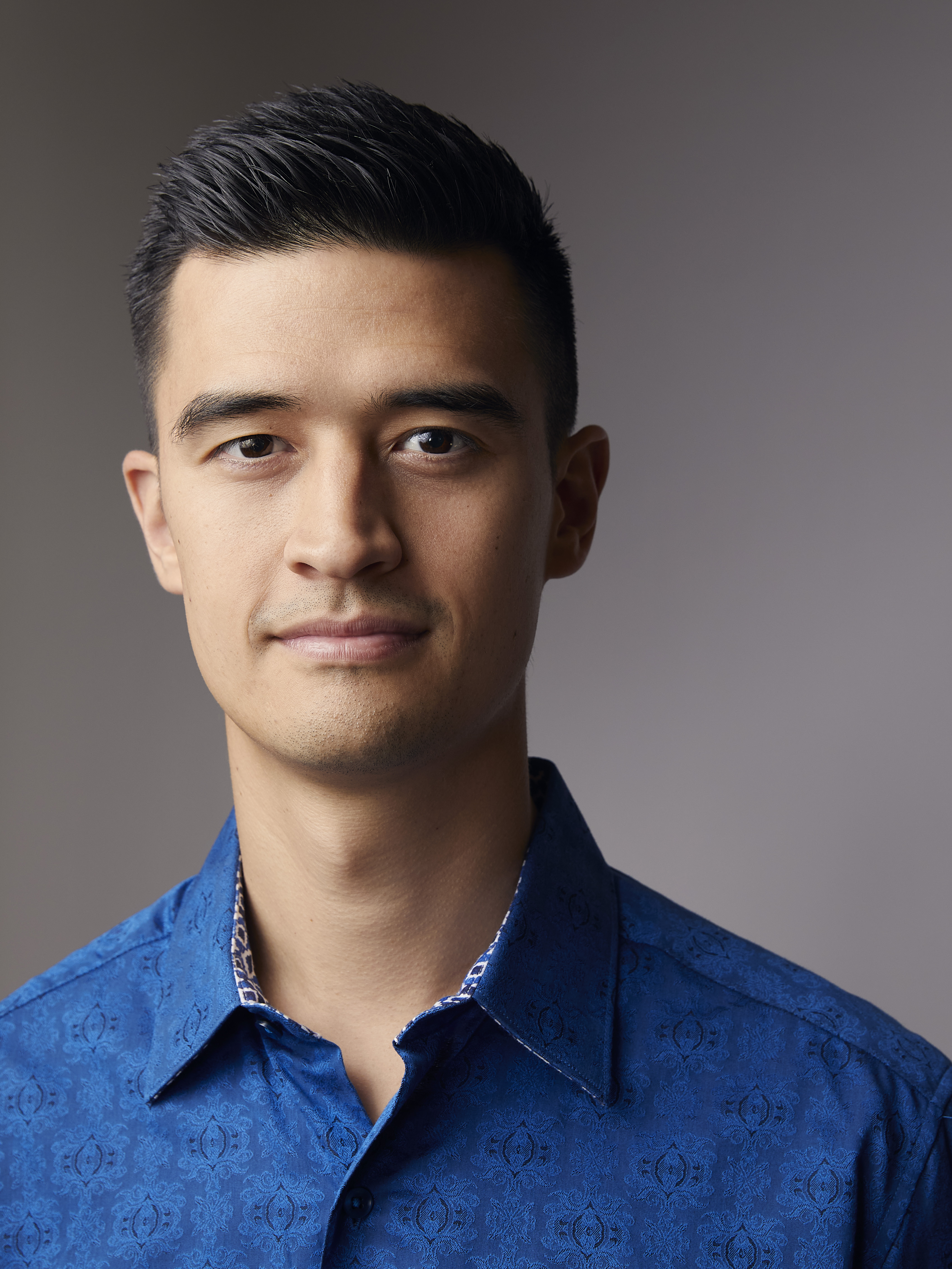
- Kotcheff in 2022
- Born: October 14, 1988 (age 37); Wilmington, North Carolina, U.S.
- Occupations: Composer; pianist
- Website: thomaskotcheff.com

Thomas Kotcheff (born October 14, 1988) is an American composer and pianist who currently resides in Los Angeles. He is a winner of a 2016 Charles Ives Prize from the American Academy of Arts and Letters and a 2015 Presser Foundation Music Award. He composed and orchestrated music for the soundtrack of the 2023 film Oppenheimer by Christopher Nolan which won the Best Score Soundtrack for Visual Media at the 66th Annual Grammy Awards and the Best Original Score at the 96th Academy Awards.

== Biography ==
Kotcheff was born in Wilmington, North Carolina and raised in Los Angeles, California. His parents are Laifun Chung and director Ted Kotcheff, and he has an older sister, Alexandra. He began taking piano lessons at the age of 4 and in 2006 he graduated from Los Angeles County High School for the Arts. In 2010, Kotcheff completed a Bachelor of Music in Piano Performance from Peabody Institute of Johns Hopkins University and then attended USC Thornton School of Music from 2010 to 2019 where he received a Masters of Master of Music and a Doctor of Music in Music Composition. He studied composition with Stephen Hartke, Donald Crockett, Frank Ticheli, and Steven Stucky, and piano with Benjamin Pasternack and Stewart L. Gordon.

Kotcheff serves as Ear Training and Music Theory Faculty at the Colburn School. He is a teaching artist at the Los Angeles Philharmonic Composer Fellowship Program. Kotcheff has held residencies at Festival International d'Art Lyrique d'Aix-en-Provence, the Los Angeles Philharmonic's National Composers Intensive, The Hermitage Artist Retreat, The Studios of Key West, and The Kimmel Harding Nelson Center for the Arts.

As a new music pianist, Kotcheff has dedicated himself to commissioning and premiering new piano works. In 2020, his performance of Frederic Rzewski's Songs of Insurrection was awarded Best Instrumental Recital Performance in Los Angeles by San Francisco Classical Voice's Audience Choice Awards. He released the world premiere recording of "Songs of Insurrection" on the Coviello Contemporary label.

In 2014, Kotcheff founded the new music piano duo HOCKET with Sarah Gibson. They were Core Artists with the Los Angeles organization Piano Spheres.

== Selected works ==
=== Orchestral ===
- go and (2017) for orchestra

=== Large ensemble ===
- gone/gone/gone beyond/gone beyond beyond (2016) for 10 musicians

=== Chamber ===
- and through and through and through (2019) for string octet
- 5ERVO (2019) for percussion duo
- unbegun (2019) for string quartet
- and more and more and more and this (2018) for two pianos and two percussion
- then and then and then this (2018) for cello and percussion
- wgah'nagl fhtagn (2017) piano four-hands & toy piano
- go in in in in & in (2017) for five cellos
- not only that one but that one & that too (2016) for percussion quartet
- scratch cradle (2015) for string quartet
- Part and Parcel (2014) for percussion quartet
- death, hocket, and roll (2014) for two toy pianos
- bang Z (2014) for bass clarinet, percussion, piano, violin, and cello
- gone into night are all the eyes (2013) for violin, cello, and piano
- that in shadow or moonlight rises (2014) for flute, clarinet, percussion, piano, classical guitar, violin, cello, and bass
- hammer/ring (2012) for two vibraphones and two marimbas

=== Solo ===
- Obbligato Snare Drum Music No. 1: The Power of Love (2020) for snare drum and playback
- Cadenza (with or without Haydn) (2020) for cello
- vacuum packed (2020) for violin
- Etude I. Poorless Wheat Dogs (2018) for piano

=== Vocal ===
- Ceceilia Speaks (2014) for soprano and piano

== Selected awards and grants ==
- 2014 Aspen Music Festival Hermitage Prize
- 2015 Presser Foundation Graduate Music Award
- 2015 BMI Foundation Student Composer Award
- 2016 Charles Ives Prize (Charles Ives Scholarship) American Academy of Arts and Letters
- 2018 New York Youth Symphony First Music Commission
- 2021 Illinois State University College of Fine Arts RED NOTE New Music Festival Composition Competition

== Discography ==
- Frederic Rzewski: Songs of Insurrection (2020)
- #What2020SoundsLike (2022) as HOCKET
- water hollows stone (2022) as HOCKET
- 3 BPM (2024) as HOCKET
- Re/Sounding: An American Songbook for Piano (2024)
- And the River (2025) as HOCKET
- Between Systems (2025)

== Film ==
Kotcheff provided the score to the 2019 independent film The Planters. Together with composer Ludwig Göransson, he co-wrote the tracks "Trinity" and "Something More Important" on the soundtrack of the 2023 film Oppenheimer by Christopher Nolan. Together with composer Kris Bowers, he co-wrote the tracks "William Gracey", "It's Happy Hour Somewhere", and "Ghost Chase" on the soundtrack of the 2023 film Haunted Mansion by Justin Simien. With Bowers, he also co-wrote the track "Burning Books" in the 2023 film Origin by Ava DuVernay and the tracks "Activating Interspecies Outreach Protocol" and "Rescue Mission" in the 2024 film The Wild Robot by Chris Sanders.
