= Music Works Northwest =

Music school in Bellevue, Washington, US

Coordinates: 47°34′50″N 122°08′57″W

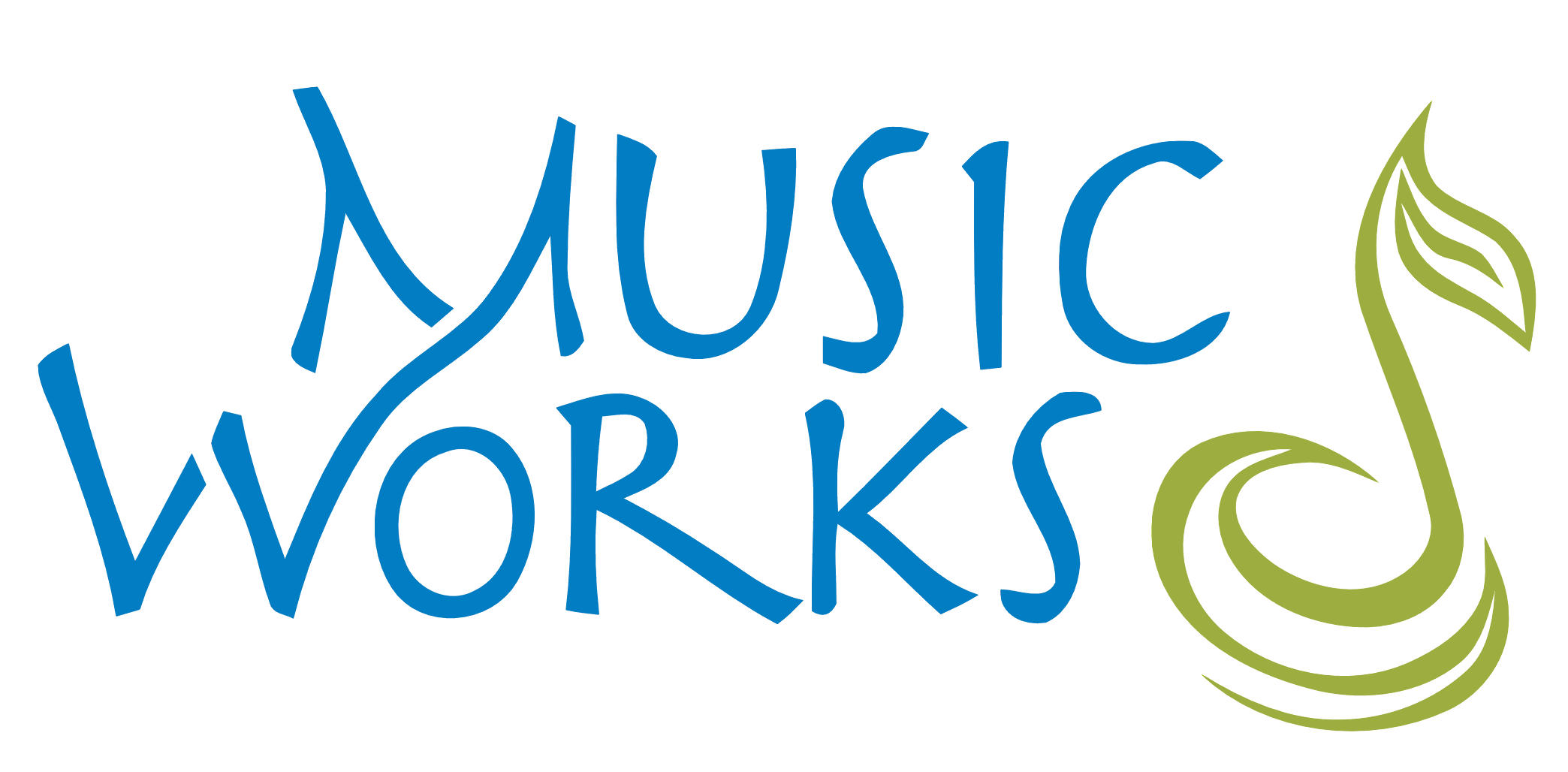
- Former names: Seattle Buddhist Scouts Drum & Bugle Corps, Seattle Imperials Drum & Bugle Corps, Imperials Music and Youth Organization
- Type: Nonprofit
- Established: 1965
- Executive Director: Ken Murphy
- Faculty: 45
- Administrative staff: 4
- Students: 500 (2025)
- Location: Bellevue, Washington, United States
- Colors: Blue, Green, Orange
- Nickname: MWNW
- Website: http://www.musicworksnw.org

Music Works Northwest is the non-profit community music school located in Bellevue, Washington, USA. Music Works Northwest is one of the largest non-profit community music schools in the Pacific Northwest. It is a member of the Washington Music Educators Association, the Eastside Arts Coalition, and the Bellevue Arts Commission. The school also has partnerships with Northwest Pianos, 4Culture of King County, United Way of King County, the Bellevue Youth Symphony Orchestra, and the Boys & Girls Clubs of King County.

== History ==
On October 5, 1965, the Seattle Buddhist Scouts Drum & Bugle Corps, Inc. was founded and parents helped finance the group by holding garage sales, bake sales, and recycling drives. On October 10, 1966, the Seattle Buddhist Scouts Drum & Bugle Corps changed its name to the Seattle Imperials Drum & Bugle Corps, Inc. at which point it became a 501(c)(3) tax-exempt nonprofit organization.

In 1973, Imperials Bingo was established which helped fund 80% of the Imperials Drum & Bugle Corps operations.

On April 17, 1992, the Imperials Drum & Bugle Corps changed their name to The Imperials Music and Youth Organization.

On April 21, 1998, Imperials Music and Youth Organization changed their name to Music Works Northwest and at the same time, completed a move from their home in Renton, Washington to the Eastgate neighborhood of Bellevue, Washington.

In September 2014, Music Works changed locations once again, to its new home in Bellevue just off the SE 8th exit of i405.

As a premier nonprofit community music school, Music Works Northwest offers private and group lessons, performance ensembles, summer camps, early childhood education, and more to thousands of King County residents of all ages each year. Music Works has an active music therapy program with numerous partnerships in the region.

Music Works faculty is composed of educators, board-certified music therapists, and ensemble directors who are recognized across the Pacific Northwest for artistic and educational expertise. 65% hold degrees from prestigious institutions including Juilliard, Eastman, Berklee, Rice, Stanford, and the University of North Texas. Faculty members are active professional musicians who perform with the region’s premier orchestras and theater companies.

In February 2016, the City Council of Bellevue unanimously voted to accept a funding agreement to allocate $75,000 from the Capital Investment Program Budget to Music Works Northwest. As part of the agreement, Music Works Northwest will provide $75,000 in free or reduced-cost lessons to low-income children and adults, as well as free public concerts for 10 years.

In December 2018, Metropolitan King County Council Vice Chair Claudia Balducci presented Music Works Northwest a $45,200 check to complete important facility upgrades to better serve the 700 students annually who participate in music instruction, classes, music therapy as well as summer camps.

== Executive Directors ==
- Michel Martel (2007-2016)
- Karen Nestvold (2016-2022)
- Dr. Tigran Arakelyan (2022-2025)
- Ken Murphy (2026-)

== Notable alumni ==
- Aaron Parks, Jazz Artist; Yamaha Performing Artist
