= Raymond Torres-Santos =

Puerto Rican composer and conductor

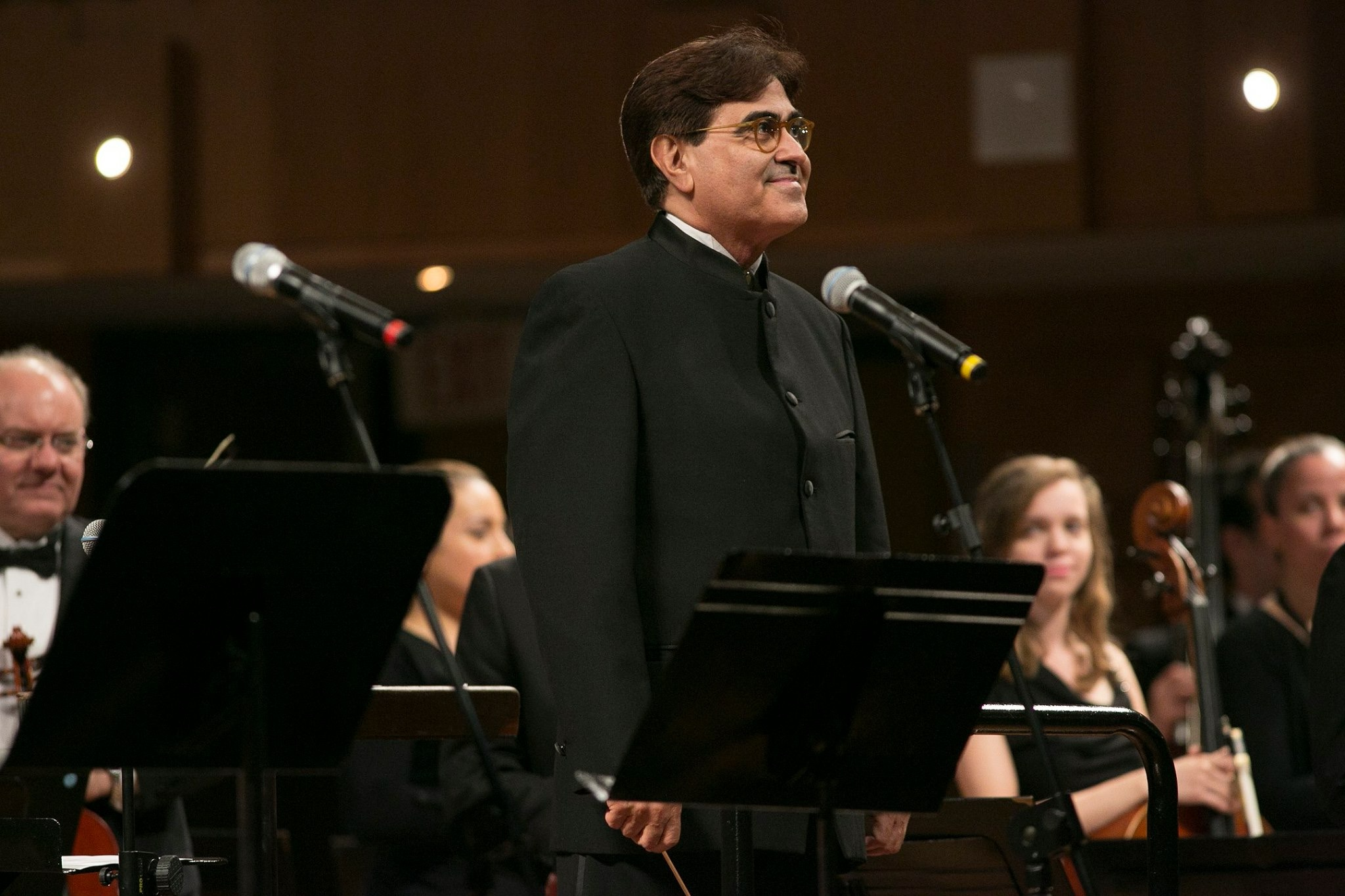

Background information
- Born: June 19, 1958 (age 68)
- Origin: Rio Piedras, Puerto Rico
- Genres: Classical and Film music
- Occupations: Composer; conductor; arranger; pianist; record producer

Raymond Torres-Santos (born June 19, 1958, in Río Piedras, Puerto Rico) is a classical and film music composer, conductor, pianist, arranger and producer. In her book, Music in Latin America and the Caribbean: an Encyclopedic History, Malena Kuss described him as the most versatile Puerto Rican composer active in the 21st century.

== Biography ==
External audio
- You may listen to Torres-Santos's "Fantasía Caribeña" interpreted by the "San Juan Pops" on YouTube.

Raymond Torres-Santos earned a Bachelor of Arts degree from the Conservatory of Music of Puerto Rico and the University of Puerto Rico. He completed graduate studies at University of California, Los Angeles, earning M.A. and Ph.D. degrees in music composition and music theory.

He carried out post-doctoral studies at the Ferienkurse fur Neue Musik, Darmstadt, Germany and later at the University of Padua, Italy. He did further post-doctoral studies at the Center for Computer Research in Music and Acoustics at Stanford University, Eastman School of Music and Harvard University.

Torres-Santos started performing professionally while in elementary school. At college, he began his musical career as a pianist and arranger for the Puerto Rico Orchestra, Los Hispanos, and the Mario Ortiz Orchestra at the Caribe Hilton Hotel, where he accompanied performers including Chita Rivera, Robert Goulet, Diahann Carroll and The Stylistics.

As an arranger, he has worked alongside many artists, including Julio Iglesias, Danny Rivera, Ednita Nazario, Elvis Crespo, Plácido Domingo, Andrea Bocelli, Deborah Voigt, Angela Gheorghiu, Ana Maria Martinez, Anita Rachvilishvili, Rafael Dávila and Juan Luis Guerra.

He was the first Puerto Rican to receive the Frank Sinatra Award in jazz composing and arranging and also the Henry Mancini Award in film scoring in Los Angeles. Torres-Santos has received other awards from organizations, including the American Society of Composers, Authors and Publishers, Broadcast Music, Inc., Meet the Composer and American Composers Forum.

After completing his doctoral studies, Torres-Santos became a music professor at various colleges, including California State University, San Bernardino and the University of Puerto Rico. He was also appointed Chancellor of the Puerto Rico Conservatory of Music.

At the beginning of the 21st century, Torres-Santos was a professor at the City University of New York, teaching at Hunter College and Hostos Community College for six years. In June 2008, Torres-Santos was appointed Dean of the College of the Arts and Communication of William Paterson University in Wayne, New Jersey. In 2011, he was appointed Dean of the College of the Arts at California State University, Long Beach (in Los Angeles County), where he is currently a full professor and the director of the music composition program.

He has performed, conducted and been a Presenter at events, such as the International Conferences of the International Society for Music Education held in Bologna, Italy (July 2008), Beijing, China (July 2010), Thessaloniki, Greece (July 2012), Glasgow, Scotland (July 2016) and Helsinki, Finland (July 2024).

He is currently a vice-president of the Board of Directors of the American Society of Music Arrangers and Composers and a voting member of the Grammy Awards, for which he has acted as judge.

== Compositions ==
Torres-Santos has composed orchestral, electronic and vocal music for concert hall, ballet, film, theater, television and radio. He received commissions to compose many of his works, such as the "1898 Overture" commissioned by the Puerto Rico Government's 1998 Centennial Commission; "Conversations with Silence", commissioned for the New Jersey Chamber Music Society; "Jersey Polyphony", commissioned by the American Composer Forum Continental Harmony Project; "Danza" (Variation on a Theme by Mozart) commissioned by the Casals Festival; "La cancion de las Antillas", commissioned by the Puerto Rico Symphony, and "Juris Oratorio", commissioned by the University of Puerto Rico. Other orchestral works include: "El Pais de los Cuatro Pisos", a symphonic poem, and "Sinfonia del Milenio", a symphonic tour of history from creation to present times in an audiovisual format. In 2014 "Symphonia: Resonantia Luminosa Infinita" for brass and orchestra was commissioned by the Casals Festival and in 2024 the Triple Concerto for Violin, Cello, Piano and Orchestra was commissioned by the Puerto Rico Symphony Orchestra.

== Performances ==
His works have been performed and/or commissioned by the American Composers Orchestra, Los Angeles Philharmonic, Pacific Symphony, North Massachusetts Philharmonic, the symphony orchestras of Reading, Queens and Washington-D.C. Opera; the Bronx Arts Ensemble, Continuum, New Jersey Chamber Music Society, West Point Woodwind Quintet, North Jersey Philharmonic Glee Club, North/South Consonance, Muse-ique Orchestra, Quintet of the Americas, Gabrieli Quintet and Voix-Touche in the USA; the symphonies of Vancouver and Toronto as well as the Canadian Opera Orchestra in Canada; the Vienna Symphony, Prague Radio Symphony, Georgia Symphony, Soria Symphony, and Warsaw Conservatory of Music Chorus and Orchestra in Europe; the National Chinese Orchestra, Shanghai Symphony, Seoul Symphony, Kaohsiung Philharmonic and Taipei Philharmonic Orchestras in Asia; the Buenos Aires, Chile, Colombia and Mexico City Symphony Orchestras in Latin America; and the Puerto Rico and Dominican Republic Symphony and Philharmonic Orchestras in the Caribbean, and featured at the Casals Festival, World Fair in Seville, Venice Biennale and Op Sail 2000. His music has also been used for television and radio programs and choreographed by dance companies.

== Recordings ==
Among recordings of his works are La Canción de las Antillas, recorded by the Puerto Rico Symphony Orchestra in 1990; Requiem, released by RTS Music Records in 1997 and featuring mezzo-soprano Ilca Lopez and baritone Rafael Cotto; Fantasia Caribeña, recorded by the San Juan Pops Orchestra in 2000; and Jubilum in 2017, Aureola in 2019, Satellites, Drones and Planes in 2021, Guakia Baba in 2022 and in 2026 Musica Naturalis under the RTS Music label. His music arrangements have been recorded by Sony Music (classical and pop). In 2014 he also produced under RTS Music, Antillano, as a jazz pianist.

== Piano ==
As a studio and jazz pianist in Los Angeles, he worked with the Maynard Ferguson, Freddie Hubbard, Bobby Shaw and Tito Puente and has been featured in film scores.

== Conducting ==
He has conducted the London Session Orchestra, Taipei Philharmonic, Cosmopolitan Symphony Orchestra, Puerto Rico Symphony and Philharmonic Orchestras, Dominican Republic National Orchestra, Queens Symphony Orchestra, Adelphi Chamber Orchestra, Bronx Arts Ensemble Orchestra and Hollywood Studio Orchestras in concerts and recordings. He was the music director for pop and jazz singers: Vikki Carr and Dianne Schuur.

== Scholarly work ==
He has written articles in peer-reviewed journals from Hofstra University and CUNY, as well as the Cambridge Scholar Publishing and Almenara Press. He is the general editor of Music Education in the Caribbean and Latin America, published by Rowman & Littlefield Publishing in conjunction with the National Association for Music Education (NAfME).

== See also ==
- List of Puerto Ricans
- List of Puerto Rican songwriters
