= Linda Chou =

American singer-songwriter

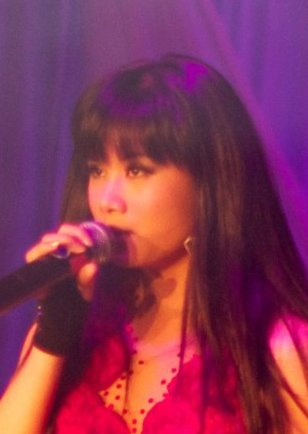
- Linda Chou, in 2014.

Background information
- Born: February 24, 1983 (age 42)
- Genres: Pop
- Occupations: Singer; Pharmacologist
- Instrument: Vocals
- Labels: Van Son Entertainment Productions, Inc.
- Website: www.linda-chou.com

Linda Chou (born February 24, 1983) is an American singer.

== Early life ==
She was born in the California, United States to a father of Taiwanese descent and a mother of Vietnamese descent. Linda started out singing at the age of three years. At that time her singing was influenced by her grandmother who always taught her short Japanese songs. First grade was when she discovered her love in singing with glee club at her elementary school. She continued glee club until fourth grade and did not join another school choir until high school. She attended Long Beach Polytechnic High School where she joined the school's Jazz I Vocal (advanced jazz ensemble), Jazz II Vocal (women's ensemble) and Chamber Choir. It was then she regained her love towards singing and performing.

She went to the University of California, San Diego, earning a bachelor's degree in pharmacological chemistry, not thinking about career in singing until she was urged by a friend to join a singing contest held by the Taiwanese Student Association. She placed first in this competition and went on to join more singing competitions where she continued to place first.

== Career ==
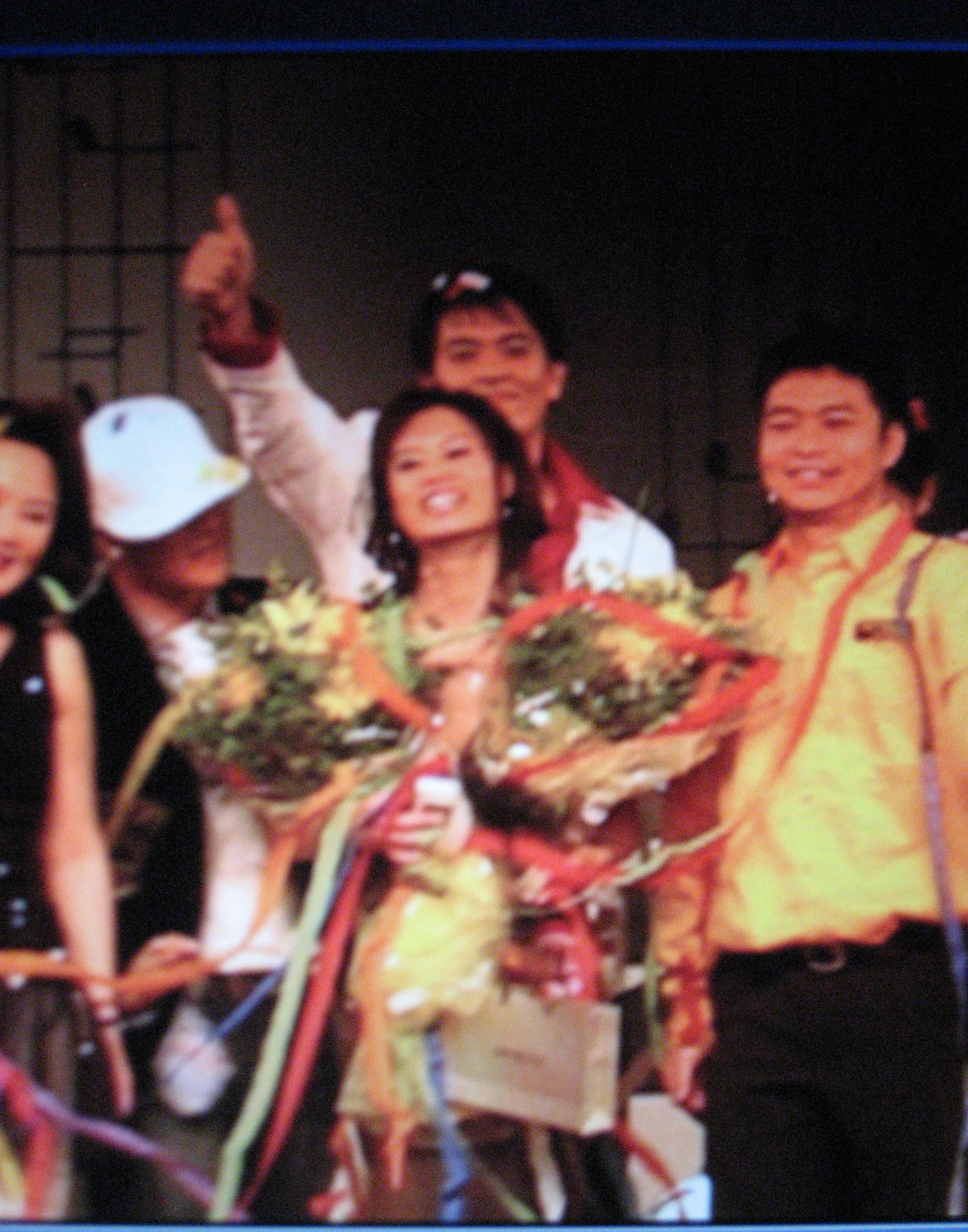
Linda Chou winning 1st place on ETTV US Top Idol 2006

Linda Chou first gained recognition in 2006 when she took first place for ETTV Chinese World Top Idol. Her performance of Whitney Houston's "I Will Always Love You" took her from competing in the United States to competing against the world in Taiwan.

She is currently singing for Van Son Entertainment Productions, Inc. Van Son Entertainment is known for their Vietnamese variety shows that include singing, and comedy skits. Van Son Entertainment is currently one of the top three Vietnamese productions in the United States next to Thuy Nga Paris By Night and Asia Entertainment.

She started off her singing career in the United States by winning ETTV US Top Idol in 2006. Then she eventually went on to winning 1st place on ETTV World Top Idol in Taiwan later that year.

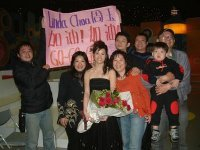
Linda Chou with family after she won ETTV world top idol 2006

She came back to the US shortly afterwards. It was at around this time that Linda was contacted by Vietnamese singer Andy Quach to record some tracks for his CD Showtime. Andy then introduced Linda to Van Son Productions and she flew right back to Taiwan to perform on her first Vietnamese variety show. Linda and Andy performed a duet "Tinh Mai Ben Nhau" where they both sang in Mandarin and Vietnamese. The song became a huge hit and was also the start of Linda's career in the Vietnamese music industry.

Linda's first solo debut was on Van Son in Singapore with the hit song "Nguoi Tinh Mua Dong". Although other singers had covered this classic Chinese song by singer Faye Wong, she was the first to perform it in both Mandarin and Vietnamese.

She went on to release her first album titled Secret in August 2008. The album contained songs that were performed in Vietnamese, Mandarin, and English. It soared to No. 8 top selling album on www.RangDong.com and her song "Cho Mong Bong Anh" ranked No. 6 in the top listened to songs.

== Discography ==
=== Albums ===
- Secret, 2008
- Eternal Love, 2011

=== Singles ===
- Tinh Mai Ben Nhau, 2008
- Nguoi Tinh Mua Dong, 2009
