= Hocket (duo) =

American contemporary music piano duo

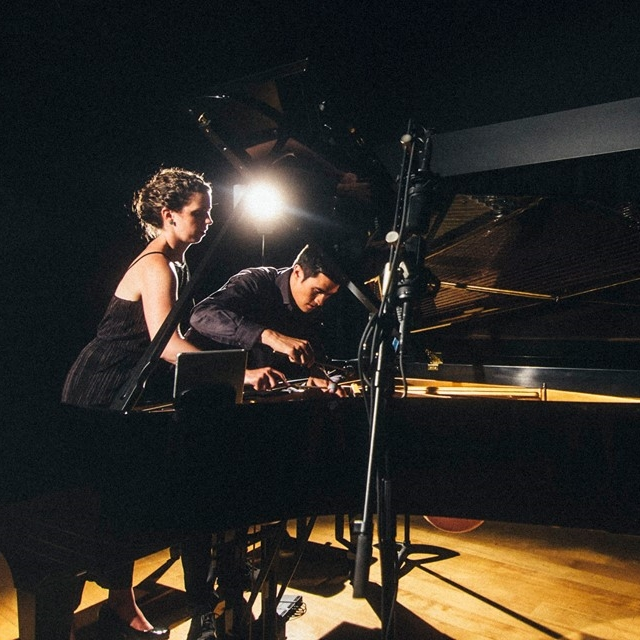

Background information
- Genres: New music / contemporary classical
- Years active: 2014–2024
- Past members: Sarah Gibson; Thomas Kotcheff
- Website: hocket.org

Hocket (stylized in all caps) was an American contemporary music piano duo that was based in Los Angeles, California. It consisted of Sarah Gibson and Thomas Kotcheff. Established in 2014, Hocket was a Piano Spheres core artist.

In 2020, Hocket was awarded Best Chamber Ensemble and Best New-Music Ensemble in Los Angeles by San Francisco Classical Voice's Audience Choice Awards.

Gibson died on 14 July 2024.
