= Film music concert =

A film music concert is an event in which all or part of a film's musical score (soundtrack) is performed live, often by a full orchestra and choir. Concerts may involve screening a film in its entirety, or a performance of several clips and may also include commentary or interviews with composers. The popularity of film music concerts has been increasing, as have the number of films available for a full orchestral performance plus screening

== Types of film music concert ==
- Concert-only performance - a concert program might include popular themes from different film soundtracks (from one or more composers), or a film's entire score
- Live to picture (also known as live to projection) - the film's entire musical score is performed alongside a screening of the film. For films with an original soundtrack the recorded music is suppressed and performed live, preserving the original dialog recording and any sound effects. The soundtrack is typically the same as the one originally used in the film but sometimes an alternative score is created for the event (65daysofstatic have performed their original score for the film Silent Running). Silent films may be accompanied by original source music, newly created music or music improvised by the musician(s).
- Film clips concert - a variant of live to picture concerts, where a selection of film clips are shown, accompanied by the music.

== See also ==
- Film score
- Pops orchestra
- Orchestral Game Music Concerts
