= Samuel Grodin =

American pianist, lecturer and teacher (born 1985)

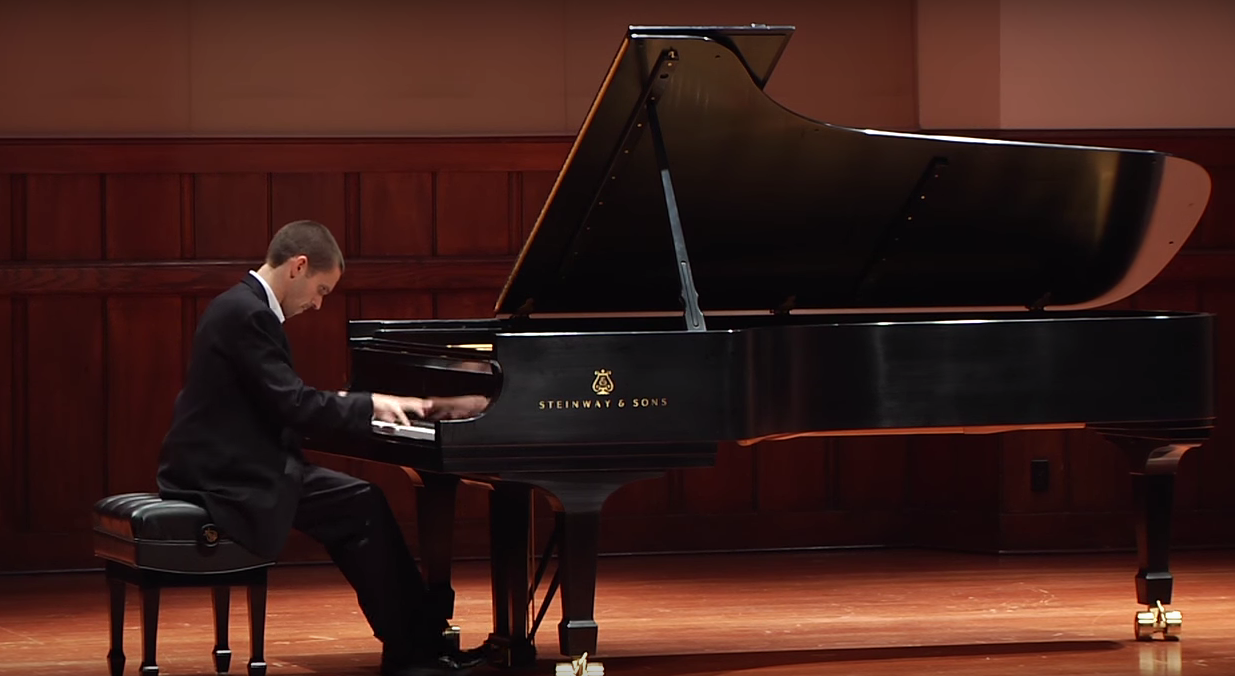
Pianist Samuel Grodin performs David Conte's Sonatine at Alfred Newman Recital Hall, University of Southern California on October 3, 2013.

Samuel Grodin (born 1985) is an American pianist, lecturer and teacher. Grodin's teachers have included Nina Scolnik, Julian Martin, Robert McDonald, Antoinette Perry, Marc Durand, Joseph Kalichstein, Sharon Mann, Craig Richey, and Lucinda Carver. Grodin has worked with Emanuel Ax, Blanca Uribe, Dominique Weber, and Stephen Hough in master classes. He teaches piano at California State University, Long Beach.

== Education ==
Grodin attended Long Beach Polytechnic High School, and California State University, Long Beach as a President's Scholar, receiving a full-ride scholarship to the Bob Cole Conservatory of Music.

While a student at CSULB, Grodin studied with Craig Richey. In 2004, Grodin was the recipient of the Dramatic Allied Arts Guild Scholarship.

Following Cole Conservatory, Grodin was accepted to the San Francisco Conservatory of Music and was the recipient for the Harold W. Scheeline Piano Scholarship, where he completed a Master of Music in Piano Performance, studying under Dr. Sharon Mann. He also worked as a Graduate Assistant for the Piano Department.

Grodin completed his doctoral degree (DMA) in Piano Performance at the Thornton School of Music at University of Southern California, studying under the acclaimed Dr. Lucinda Carver, the Vice Dean of Classical Music Performance at USC and guest conductor at the LA Phil.

== Awards ==
- 2003 Bellflower Symphony Concerto Competition – Winner
- 2008 Bob Cole Conservatory of Music Concerto Competition – Winner
- 2010 XIX Ibiza International Piano Competition – Special Prize Best performance of a contemporary work
- 2015 Classics Alive Artists – Honorable Mention
- 2015 Seattle International Piano Competition – Silver medalist

== Professional career ==
=== As an educator ===
- The Colburn School - piano faculty
- Bob Cole Conservatory of Music - piano faculty

=== As a judge ===
- Jack Gard Music Competition – May 7, 2015, Grodin was one of three judges to choose winners of The Los Angeles Music and Art School's (LAMusArt) annual Jack Gard Music Competition.

=== As a performer ===
- Ensemble Parallele – in 2010, Grodin performed with Ensemble Parallele in San Francisco.
- The Trevor Project Benefit Concert – On April 30, 2011, Grodin and many of his SFCM colleagues performed in a concert to support the Trevor Project.
- Bob Cole Conservatory of Music – April 7, 2012, Grodin took part in the Multi-Piano Extravaganza

=== As a public speaker ===
- 2016 MTNA Collegiate Symposium – Lecture, The Value of Teaching Popular Music, January 16, 2016
- Bob Cole Conservatory of Music – Alumni Lecture Recital, Ligeti’s Musica Ricercata, March 16, 2016

== See also ==
- List of classical pianists
- List of people from Long Beach, California
- Long Beach Polytechnic High School
- Bob Cole Conservatory of Music
- San Francisco Conservatory of Music
- USC Thornton School of Music
