= Ted Atkatz =

- Born: August 24, 1976 (age 49); Queens, New York, U.S.
- Occupations: Musician; teacher
- Instrument: Percussion
- Member of: NYCO
- Formerly of: Chicago Symphony Orchestra
- Website: tedatkatz.com

Ted Atkatz is the founder of and frontman for the Los Angeles-based alternative rock group NYCO. He is a former principal percussionist for the Chicago Symphony Orchestra (CSO).

Atkatz left the CSO in 2006 to devote himself full-time to NYCO. The band released its debut album, Two, in 2005. NYCO released its second album, Realize, in June 2008, and its third album, Future Imperfect, in October 2012.

Atkatz grew up in Queens, New York, where he began studying percussion at an early age. He studied at the preparatory division of the Manhattan School of Music and graduated from Benjamin N. Cardozo High School before moving on to Boston University, where he received a bachelor's degree in percussion performance and music education. He later studied at the New England Conservatory of Music in Boston and received a professional studies degree in percussion performance from Temple University. Ted is now the Director of Percussion Studies at the Bob Cole Conservatory of Music at California State University at Long Beach. He also is on faculty at Lynn Conservatory of Music in Boca Raton, Florida, The Colburn School in Los Angeles, California and, the Music Academy of the West, in Montecito, California.
