= John Barcellona =

American musician

John Barcellona is the Director of Woodwind Studies and Professor of Flute at CSULB and flutist with Westwood Wind Quintet recorded on Columbia, Crystal, and Western International Music.

== Education ==
He received his B.M. from Hartt School of Music, his M.A. from CSULB and D.M.A. from USC.

== Career ==
He is currently on the Board of Directors for the National Flute Association. His solo album, Is This The Way To Carnegie Hall (with Calvin Smith, horn) was nominated to the National Academy of Recording Arts and Sciences for a Grammy Award.
