= NYCO (band) =

Alternative rock group from Chicago, Illinois

NYCO is a four-man alternative rock group based in Chicago, Illinois. It is led by Ted Atkatz, a former principal percussionist for the Chicago Symphony Orchestra. NYCO stands for New York, from which Atkatz hails, and Colorado, the home of co-founder Rob Kassinger. On 6 February 2007, The New York Times featured NYCO in an article titled "From Lead Percussionist to Different Drummer," noting that "it is rare for an orchestra musician to abandon the classical realm for a career in rock," and "It is even rarer for someone of Mr. Atkatz’s stature to do so."
