= Cello Concerto (Rouse) =

Concerto for cello and orchestra by Christopher Rouse

The Violoncello Concerto is a concerto for cello and orchestra by the American composer Christopher Rouse. It was commissioned to celebrate the 75th anniversary of the Los Angeles Philharmonic by philanthropist Betty Freeman—to whom the work is dedicated—and completed October 27, 1992. The piece was premiered in Los Angeles, January 26, 1994, with conductor David Zinman leading cellist Yo-Yo Ma and the Los Angeles Philharmonic.

== Composition ==
Similar to Rouse's previous Violin Concerto, the Violoncello Concerto is composed in two movements:

1. Combattimento
2. Adagiati

The movements are titled from the works of innovative Renaissance/Baroque composer Claudio Monteverdi. Additionally, the piece contains quotes from Monteverdi's opera L'incoronazione di Poppea and William Schuman's song Orpheus with his Lute. Edgar Allan Poe's poem "The Conqueror Worm" was also placed in the score as a motto for the piece.

=== Inspiration ===
Rouse described the Violoncello Concerto as a "meditation upon death" in response to the passing of several colleagues and fellow composers. In the program note to the score, Rouse wrote:

During the long gestation and composition of the concerto, the music world lost a number of significant creative figures, several of whom were personal friends. Leonard Bernstein and Aaron Copland had been reflected in my trombone concerto, completed early in 1991. The next two years saw the passing of Olivier Messiaen, John Cage, and William Mathias, among others. Especially dear to me was the loss late in 1991 of Sir Andrzej Panufnik, whom I had come to know only in the final years of his remarkable life. Even more painful was the sudden death on my forty-third birthday of William Schuman, for almost thirty years a friend and mentor of incalculable importance in my life. As a result, my violoncello concerto became a meditation upon death — the struggle to deny it and its ultimate inevitability.

== Reception ==
Reviewing the world premiere, Edward Rothstein of The New York Times praised "marvelous effects" of Rouse's composition, despite noting its somber tone. Rothstein further remarked, "The danger in his style is partly that the anger and despair can seem motivated by events outside the music more than by events within it. But when it works -- as it does in his Violin Concerto and in the Cello Concerto -- one is drawn into Mr. Rouse's emotional universe and is moved by its craft as well."

Conversely, Ivan Hewett of BBC Music Magazine was much more critical and referred to the concerto as "mediocre music."
