= Gorgon (composition) =

Composition by Christopher Rouse

Gorgon is a composition for orchestra by the American composer Christopher Rouse. The work was commissioned by the Rochester Philharmonic Orchestra with support from the Rochester Sesquicentennial Committee to commemorated the one hundred and fiftieth anniversary of the founding of Rochester. It was completed in the summer of 1984 and was first performed in Rochester on November 15, 1984, by the Rochester Philharmonic Orchestra under the direction of David Zinman, to whom the piece is dedicated.

== Composition ==
=== Background ===
Gorgon was one of Rouse's first major compositions for symphony orchestra. The composer had long planned the piece and, rather than write a ceremonial work, used the Rochester Philharmonic Orchestra's commission to see its realization. Gorgon was inspired by the legend of the three Gorgons from Greek mythology: Stheno, Euryale, and Medusa. Rouse described the creatures in the score program notes, writing:

These three mythical monsters — Stheno, Euryale, and Medusa — were repulsive beasts with snakes for hair and tusks for teeth; on their shoulders were immense wings of gold. But so hideous were their faces that a single glance from any of them was enough to turn any human unfortunate enough to come across them into solid stone. Medusa, the only mortal of the trio, was ultimately slain by Perseus, who avoided direct eye contact with his deadly prey by following her reflected form in his shield.

He added, "Since the time of the ancient Greeks, the gorgon has become a symbol for any terror too immense — and too horrible — to be faced. It has thus become an image of sublimated brutality and savagery, perhaps a metaphor for our own private and subconscious monsters." He concluded, "In addition to certain intentional similarities common to musical materials from movement to movement, the unifying force throughout the score remains the consistent violence of its character and the fearsomeness of its subject."

=== Structure ===
The piece has a duration of roughly 17 minutes and is cast in three movements connected by two percussion interludes:

1. Stheno
  Perseus Spell I
2. Euryale
  Perseus Spell II
3. Medusa

=== Instrumentation ===
The work is scored for a large orchestra consisting of three flutes (all doubling piccolos), three oboes (3rd doubling English horn), three clarinets (3rd doubling bass clarinet), three bassoons (3rd doubling contrabassoon), four horns, three trumpets, three trombones, tuba, timpani, four percussionists, harp, piano (doubling celesta), and strings.

== Reception ==
Christopher Mowat of BBC Music Magazine described Gorgon as predictably "loud and violent." Edward Rothstein of The New York Times compared the piece to Rouse's "The Infernal Machine" and said it has "an almost animalistic energy, straining at the bounds of concert-hall manners." Gramophone called the work "a startling demonstration of the energy (sometimes achieved at the expense of textural sensitivity) that informed Rouse's previous creative phases, conclusive proof that concert music can explode with the volume and drive of rock." Jeff Dunn of NewMusicBox similarly opined, "This monstrosity is so loud that at least one orchestra rebelled rather than play it. As far as I know, this work—one of the most viscerally driven in the entire repertoire has been played only three times since its Cabrillo appearance. (It premiered in Rochester in 1984.) Yet it is to his oeuvre as The Rite of Spring is to Stravinsky's, and should be heard far more frequently. Although it's available in recording, nothing compares to experiencing this incredible music live."
