= Envoi (disambiguation) =

Envoi is a short stanza at the end of a poem.

Envoi may also refer to:

- Envoi (album), an album by Bill Dixon
- Envoi (composition), a single-movement orchestral composition by Christopher Rouse

== See also ==
- Envoy (disambiguation)
