= Clarinet Concerto (Rouse) =

Concerto by Christopher Rouse

The Clarinet Concerto is a concerto for clarinet and orchestra by the American composer Christopher Rouse. The work was commissioned for the Chicago Symphony Orchestra and its principal clarinetist Larry Combs by the Institute for American Music. It was completed December 11, 2000, and premiered May 17, 2001, at Symphony Center in Chicago with Christoph Eschenbach conducting the Chicago Symphony Orchestra. The piece is dedicated to Rouse's friend and fellow composer Augusta Read Thomas.

== Composition ==
Having composed his previous work Rapture in an almost entirely consonant manner, Rouse attempted to "reinvent" his composition style in the single-movement Clarinet Concerto. Thus, the style of the piece is distinctly more chromatic and dissonant than its predecessor, while also employing seemingly desultory changes in mood and form. In the program notes to the concerto, Rouse remarked:

My final act of 'reinvention' was, for the first time since my early undergraduate student days, to employ elements of randomness and indeterminacy in the composing of the work. Interjected in my concerto at three points are short three-movement 'microconcerti,' their point of interpolation determined by random processes. These microconcerti have a more discernibly 'classical' cast to them, and they increasingly have recourse to tonality; each is also approximately half the length of its predecessor.

Rouse also declared of the concerto, "...it is a work that has taken me longer to compose than has any other score of mine to date."

== Reception ==
Calum MacDonald of BBC Music Magazine described the piece as "...mercurially changeable in direction and material, playing irreverent games with the number 12, and with a burlesque embedded pastiche ‘mini-concerto’ whose appearances are determined (shades of John Cage!) by rolls of the dice." Reviewing the world premiere of the concerto, John von Rhein of the Chicago Tribune praised the clarinet writing as "test[ing] the virtuosity of the soloist" and the composition as a whole for "dar[ing] the audience to hang on tight as it takes them on the high-energy roller-coaster ride of their lives." Rhein further commented:

One of the remarkable things about this single-movement, 18-minute workout for clarinetist and orchestra is that you never quite know how far Rouse will go to pull your leg. Surely those noisy razzberries that go up from the winds and brass at the outset are meant as a joke -- likewise the police whistle at the end. But is there an implied program? Combs' frantic, squealing attempts to make his clarinet heard are rudely silenced, first by obstreperous brass, later by pounding percussion. He resembles nothing so much as an athlete heroically attempting to run a one-man race strewn with nasty obstacles.
