= Karolju =

Work for choir and orchestra by Christopher Rouse

Karolju is a suite of original Christmas carols for choir and orchestra by the American composer Christopher Rouse. The work was commissioned in 1989 by the Baltimore Symphony Orchestra with support from the philanthropist Randolph Rothschild and the Barlow Endowment. It was completed in November 1990 and first performed on November 7, 1991, by the Baltimore Symphony Orchestra and Chorus conducted by David Zinman. The piece is dedicated to Rouse's daughter Alexandra.

== Composition ==
=== Background ===
Rouse first conceived Karolju in the early 1980s as a collection of Christmas carols in a form modeled after the cantata Carmina Burana by the German composer Carl Orff. Though the work wasn't commissioned until 1989, Rouse had already composed a number of the carols to be included in the work. He wrote in the score program notes:

As I wished to compose the music first, the problem of texts presented itself. Finding appropriate existing texts to fit already composed music would have been virtually impossible, and as I did not trust my own ability to devise a poetically satisfying text, I decided to compose my own texts in a variety of languages (Latin, Swedish, French, Spanish, Russian, Czech, German, and Italian) which, although making reference to words and phrases appropriate to the Christmas season, would not be intelligibly translatable as complete entities. It was rather my intent to match the sound of the language to the musical style of the carol to which it was applied. I resultantly selected words often more for the quality of their sound and the extent to which such sound typified the language of their origin than for their cognitive "meaning" per se.

Rouse wrote the music in a manner that was "direct and simple in its tonal orientation," despite the trends of late 20th-century classical music. Addressing the work's anachronistic qualities, he wrote, "Those who know other of my works may be surprised — some even distressed — by Karolju. While I can assert with assurance that this score does not represent a wholesale 'change of direction' for me and thus constitutes an isolated example among my compositions, Karolju is nevertheless a piece which I 'mean' with the most profound sincerity, one which I hope will help instill in listeners the same special joy which I feel for the season it celebrates."

Though the music of Karolju is original, the first and tenth movements of the work paraphrase the coda of "O Fortuna" from Carmina Burana. The third movement also quotes a four-measure phrase from The Nutcracker by the Russian composer Pyotr Ilyich Tchaikovsky, which itself dates back to an 18th-century minuet.

=== Structure ===
Karolju has duration of roughly 27 minutes and consists of 11 original carols:

1. Latin
2. Swedish
3. French
4. Spanish
5. Little March of the Three Kings
6. Latin
7. Russian
8. Czech
9. German
10. Latin
11. Italian

=== Instrumentation ===
The work is scored for SATB choir and an orchestra comprising two flutes (2nd doubling piccolo), two oboes, two clarinets, two bassoons, four horns, three trumpets, three trombones, tuba, timpani, four percussionists (on glockenspiel, two tambourines, snare drum, triangle, two pairs of cymbals, rute, small cymbals, bass drum, chimes, sleigh bells, maracas, and güiro), harp, and strings.

== Reception ==
Joshua Kosman of the San Francisco Chronicle praised Karolju, writing, "Rouse's plan, he says, was to write a collection of carols similar in form to Orff's Carmina Burana; the joke is that the music, the texts and even the title are wholly invented. Yet Rouse's score, full of vivacious rhythms and sweet, simple harmonies, is as carol-icious as the real thing." Julie Amacher of Minnesota Public Radio also lauded the piece, calling it an "uplifting work" and writing, "Traditions are handed down from one generation to another. Christopher Rouse established a new tradition when he composed Karolju to celebrate his daughter's first Christmas in 1990. With this world premiere recording, this music can now become a tradition for all of us."

Conversely, Anthony Burton of BBC Music Magazine critically referred to the composition as "a rum affair" and wrote, "not only is the title a made-up word, but the composer’s texts, in eight different languages, are meaningless apart from the odd seasonal phrase. That’s hardly an incentive to clear enunciation or clear recording. And indeed the piece sounds like nothing so much as half-heard Christmas background music in some upmarket department store."

== See also ==
- Karolj
- List of Christmas carols
