= Compline (disambiguation) =

Compline is one of the Christian canonical hours.

Compline may also refer to:

- Compline (composition), a 1996 chamber music piece by Christopher Rouse
- Compline Choir, a choral group in Seattle, Washington, US
- "Compline", a poem in the 1955 Horae Canonicae series by W. H. Auden

== Other ==
- Complan, a British company that makes powdered milk energy drinks
