= Symphony No. 3 (Rouse) =

Symphony by Christopher Rouse

Symphony No. 3 is an orchestral composition in two movements by the American composer Christopher Rouse. The work was jointly commissioned by the St. Louis Symphony, the Baltimore Symphony Orchestra, the Royal Stockholm Philharmonic Orchestra, and the Singapore Symphony Orchestra. It was completed February 3, 2011, and premiered May 5, 2011, by the Saint Louis Symphony under David Robertson at Powell Hall in St. Louis, Missouri. The piece is dedicated to Rouse's high school music teacher, John Merrill.

== Composition ==
Rouse conceived the Symphony No. 3 as a reworking of Sergei Prokofiev's Symphony No. 2 in D minor (itself a homage to Beethoven's final Piano Sonata), though there are relatively few musical quotes from the work. Instead, as Rouse wrote in the program notes, he used the "unusual form of Prokofiev's Symphony No. 2" to "[furnish] the old bottle into which I have tried to pour new wine." The symphony has a duration of approximately 25 minutes and is composed in two movements; the first is a "savage and aggressive" homage to the symphony of "iron and steel" and the second is a theme with five variations. The name of Rouse's later wife Natasha (Miller) was encoded into Symphony No. 3 using a system that assigned musical pitches to letters. The symphony is a musical portrait of his second wife.

=== Instrumentation ===
The symphony is scored for piccolo, two flutes, two oboes, English horn, two clarinets, bass clarinet, two bassoons, contrabassoon, four French horns, four trumpets, four trombones, tuba, two harps, timpani, percussion (three players), and strings (violins I & II, violas, violoncellos, and double basses).

== Reception ==
Tim Smith of The Baltimore Sun said the work built up "startling energy" and added that it "makes a substantial addition to the orchestral repertoire. It leaves you almost reeling — in a good way — from an assault on the senses." Reviewing the world premiere, Chuck Lavazzi of KDHX called the symphony "a fiercely challenging work that demands remarkable stamina and skill from every member of the orchestra. In that last respect it reminded me as much of Bartok’s Concerto for Orchestra as it did of the Prokofiev work. An aggressive mix of wild cacophony and surprising lyricism, the piece was clearly not received with enthusiasm by everyone, but my wife and I both found it bracing." Joshua Kosman of the San Francisco Chronicle similarly described the piece as "a phenomenal score, as vivid and beautiful as anything this composer has ever done."
