= Supplica =

Orchestral work by Christopher Rouse

Supplica is a short composition for orchestra by the American composer Christopher Rouse. It was jointly commissioned by the Pittsburgh Symphony Orchestra and the Pacific Symphony. The first performance of the piece was given in Heinz Hall for the Performing Arts, Pittsburgh by the Pittsburgh Symphony Orchestra under conductor Juraj Valcuha on April 4, 2014.

== Composition ==
Supplica is composed in a single movement and has a duration of roughly 10 minutes.

=== Background ===
Rouse composed the piece in the fall 2013 as in informal "companion piece" to his Symphony No. 4, completed earlier that year. The title of the work means "supplication" in the Italian language, though Rouse has remained deliberately ambiguous as to the meaning of the piece. He wrote in the score program notes:

Both were works I felt an inner compulsion to write, but both also possess meanings for me that must remain personal. This certainly does not mean that either piece is intended to be "impersonal" — rather that what I hope will be heard as both an intimate and an impassioned communication in sound must mean to each listener what it will, without further intercession or guidance from the me.

=== Instrumentation ===
The work is scored for a small orchestra comprising four horns, two trumpets, three trombones, harp, and strings.

== Reception ==
Reviewing the world premiere, Elizabeth Bloom of the Pittsburgh Post-Gazette described the composition as "affecting" and wrote, "Featuring a pared-down orchestra without woodwinds or percussion, it opened with slow, quiet violas and plucked harp, a motif that returned later. Haunting strings filled in to create beauty both visceral and jarring; that disturbing quality grew with the volume of added instruments, with brass entering last." Bloom continued, "A surprising explosion of dissonance in the largely lyrical piece appeared suddenly, like an unpleasant memory. The piece ultimately fades to silence — a moving ending in line with the rest of the work. The layers suggested more opportunities to listen to Supplica would be rewarding." Bob Karlovits of the Pittsburgh Tribune-Review similarly said it "was filled with lush, shifting harmonies." Reviewing the West Coast premiere with Pacific Symphony, Timothy Mangan of the Orange County Register remarked, "It’s a somber and serious work, a Mahlerian adagio some 14 minutes in length, prayerful, hopeful, earnest, but tinged with darkness and dissonance and agitation." He added, "The whole piece is as if laboring toward this light, but it never quite gets there, ending with a hazy question mark."
