= String Quartet No. 2 =

String Quartet No. 2 may refer to:

- String Quartet No. 2 (Babbitt) by Milton Babbitt
- String Quartet No. 2 (Bartók) by Béla Bartók
- String Quartet No. 2 (Beethoven) by Ludwig van Beethoven
- String Quartet No. 2 (Bois), Pastorale V by Rob du Bois
- String Quartet No. 2 (Borodin) by Alexander Borodin
- String Quartet No. 2 (Brahms) by Johannes Brahms
- String Quartet No. 2 (Bridge) by Frank Bridge
- String Quartet No. 2 (Britten) by Benjamin Britten
- String Quartet No. 2 (Carter) by Elliott Carter
- String Quartet No. 2 (Diamond) by David Diamond
- String Quartet No. 2 (Dvořák) by Antonín Dvořák
- String Quartet No. 2 (Enescu) by George Enescu
- String Quartet No. 2 (Feldman) by Morton Feldman
- String Quartet No. 2 (Ferneyhough) by Brian Ferneyhough
- String Quartet No. 2 (Glass) by Philip Glass
- String Quartet No. 2 (Haas), From the Monkey Mountains by Pavel Haas
- String Quartet No. 2 (Halffter) Mémoires by Cristóbal Halffter
- String Quartet No. 2 (Haydn) by Joseph Haydn
- String Quartet No. 2 (Hill) by Alfred Hill
- String Quartet No. 2 (Janáček), Intimate Letters by Leoš Janáček
- String Quartet No. 2 (Kernis) by Aaron Jay Kernis
- String Quartet No. 2 (Kirchner) by Leon Kirchner
- String Quartet No. 2 (Ligeti) by György Ligeti
- String Quartet No. 2 (McCabe) by John McCabe
- String Quartet No. 2 (Marco), Espejo desierto by Tomás Marco
- String Quartet No. 2 (Mendelssohn) by Felix Mendelssohn
- String Quartet No. 2 (Milhaud), Op. 16, by Darius Milhaud
- String Quartet No. 2 (Mozart) by Wolfgang Amadeus Mozart
- String Quartet No. 2 (Nielsen) by Carl Nielsen
- String Quartet No. 2 (Maconchy) by Elizabeth Maconchy
- String Quartet No. 2 (Oswald) by Henrique Oswald
- String Quartet No. 2 (Persichetti), Op. 24, by Vincent Persichetti
- String Quartet No. 2 (Piston) by Walter Piston
- String Quartet No. 2 (Porter) by Quincy Porter
- String Quartet No. 2 (Prokofiev) by Sergei Prokofiev
- String Quartet No. 2 (Revueltas), Magueyes by Silvestre Revueltas
- String Quartet No. 2 (Rihm) by Wolfgang Rihm
- String Quartet No. 2 (Rouse) by Christopher Rouse
- String Quartet No. 2 (Schoenberg) by Arnold Schoenberg
- String Quartet No. 2 (Schubert) by Franz Schubert
- String Quartet No. 2 (Shostakovich) by Dmitri Shostakovich
- String Quartet No. 2 (Smetana) by Bedřich Smetana
- String Quartet No. 2 (Tchaikovsky) by Pyotr Ilyich Tchaikovsky
- String Quartet No. 2 (Tippett) by Michael Tippett
- String Quartet No. 2 (Villa-Lobos) by Heitor Villa-Lobos
- String Quartet in A minor (Walton), by William Walton
