= Heimdall's Trumpet =

Trumpet concerto by Christopher Rouse

Heimdall's Trumpet is a concerto for trumpet and orchestra by the American composer Christopher Rouse. It was commissioned by the Chicago Symphony Orchestra for its principal trumpeter Christopher Martin. The piece was completed January 21, 2012, and premiered December 20, 2012, at Symphony Center in Chicago.

== Composition ==
=== Title ===
The title is derived from the god Heimdallr of Norse mythology, whose call on the Gjallarhorn was to announce the apocalyptic events of Ragnarök ("Fate of the Gods"). The events of Ragnarök were also famously depicted musically in Richard Wagner's opera Götterdämmerung, last of his four-opera cycle Der Ring des Nibelungen. Rouse had previously visited similar thematic material with his 1997 percussion concerto Der gerettete Alberich, which chronicles the exploits of the villainous dwarf Alberich following the destruction of Valhalla.

=== Structure ===
Heimdall's Trumpet is composed in four connected movements. A performance of the work lasts approximately 22 minutes. In the score program notes, Rouse wrote:

Cast in four movements, the title of the piece refers properly to the finale, which attempts in a general way to depict these mythological events as I imagine them. The onset of Ragnarok occurs only at the very end of the work, in a very short orchestral fortissimo outburst followed by an extended silence. The first movement is declamatory in nature and gives way to a whirlwind scherzo that utilizes a variety of mutes for both the soloist and the orchestral brass section. The third movement is a largo that swings like a pendulum between sections of substantive dissonance and straightforward consonance. The aforementioned finale, more specifically dramatic and programmatic in nature, returns to the more aggressive world of the first movement.

=== Instrumentation ===
The piece is scored for solo trumpet and orchestra comprising three flutes (third doubling on piccolo), three oboes, three clarinets, three bassoons (third doubling on contrabassoon), four French horns, three trumpets, three trombones, tuba, harp, timpani, percussion (three players), and strings (violins I & II, violas, violoncellos, and double basses).

== Reception ==
Reviewing the world premiere, music critic John von Rhein of the Chicago Tribune highly lauded the concerto as "bolster[ing] Rouse's reputation as one of the most compelling American composers around" and noted, "The musical style melds the pile-driver sonorities and manic accumulation of rhythmic energy of Rouse's earlier manner with the more consonant calm of his recent pieces. The work is slow to take off, but once it does, it makes you want to hold on to the roller coaster and enjoy the ride." Rhein also praised the trumpet and orchestral writing, adding, "Rouse's handling of the orchestra, right up to a screaming mass plunge off the musical cliff at the very end (abruptly followed by ominous silence), is nothing if not individual." Lawrence A. Johnson of the Chicago Classical Review called the piece "another Rouse success" and wrote, "Heimdall’s Trumpet is among the finest of Rouse’s works. Spiced with the composer’s usual ear for percussive coloring and rhythmic insistence, and scored with characteristic ingenuity and audacity with plenty of opportunities for the soloist, this work should find a wide audience (for those hardy trumpeters who can handle its tortuous demands)."

== Sources ==
- Lindow, John (2001). Norse Mythology: A Guide to Gods, Heroes, Rituals, and Beliefs. Oxford University Press. ISBN 0-19-515382-0.
