= Trombone Concerto (Rouse) =

Pulitzer Prize-winning concerto by Christopher Rouse

The Trombone Concerto is a concerto for trombone and orchestra by the American composer Christopher Rouse. The work was commissioned by the New York Philharmonic for its principal trombonist Joseph Alessi. It was completed on April 5, 1991, and was first performed by Alessi and the New York Philharmonic conducted by Leonard Slatkin on December 30, 1992, in Avery Fisher Hall, New York City. The concerto is dedicated to the composer and conductor Leonard Bernstein, who died suddenly October 14, 1990. In 1993, the work was awarded the Pulitzer Prize for Music.

== Composition ==
The concerto, lasting approximately half an hour in performance, is written in three movements played without pause:

1. Adagio
2. Scherzo
3. Adagio

The third movement, which Rouse especially intended as a tribute to Bernstein, quotes a theme from Bernstein's Symphony No. 3, Kaddish. On dedicating the concerto to Bernstein, Rouse wrote:

I got the opportunity to know Mr. Bernstein only in the summer of 1989, although I had admired his work as composer, conductor, and musical evangelist for most of my life. He remains for me a figure of inestimable importance in the history of music, one whose passion for and commitment to his art was insurpassable, and his sudden death in October 1990 robbed us all of an almost superhuman musical giant. The third movement of my concerto is, in particular, a memorial to Mr. Bernstein, and the quotation of what I call the 'Credo' theme from his Symphony No. 3 ('Kaddish') a gesture of the most profound affection and gratitude, mingled with sorrow at his passing.

=== Instrumentation ===
The concerto is scored for a solo trombone and orchestra, comprising two bassoons, contrabassoon, four French horns, three trumpets, three trombones, tuba, harp, timpani, xylophone, glockenspiel, chimes, marimba, two suspended cymbals, snare drum, tenor drum, five tom-toms, two bongo drums, bass drum, a pair of crash cymbals, two tamtams, and strings (violins I & II, violas, violoncellos, and double basses).

== Reception ==
Edward Rothstein of The New York Times called the concerto "an obsessive work" and praised it as "distinctive, unsettling, yet structurally clear." Gramophone also praised the piece, likening it to the music of Mahler, Copland, and Shostakovich, and lauded it as "pack[ing] a formidable punch." Christopher Mowat of BBC Music Magazine commended the work, further noting:

Thirty minutes is long for a trombone concerto. Many composers would have exhausted the stimulation the instrument provides in much less time, fearful of having the soloist on his knees with fatigue. Neither of these concerns has restricted Christopher Rouse... From the soloist’s first slow entry, in the lowest register, you know that nothing is going to be rushed. This music will need space. When it finally settles back in the same sombre depths after its three linked movements, the formal achievement is satisfactorily apparent. In between, the music ranges from flowing cantilenas to anarchic musical brawling: at the climax of the scherzo, the soloist has to see off the orchestral trombones trying to get in on the act.

== Recordings ==
- An American Celebration, Vol. 2 (New York Philharmonic Special Editions) – 2000 OCLC 42766217
  - Joseph Alessi, trombone; New York Philharmonic; Leonard Slatkin, conductor (live recording).
- American Trombone Concertos, Vol. 2 (BIS-CD-788) – 1996 OCLC 35162844
  - Christian Lindberg, trombone; BBC National Orchestra of Wales; Grant Llewellyn, conductor.
- Christopher Rouse: Gorgon (RCA 09026-68410-2) – 1997 OCLC 166426847
  - Joseph Alessi, trombone; Colorado Symphony Orchestra; Marin Alsop, conductor.
