= String Quartet No. 3 =

String Quartet No. 3 may refer to:

- String Quartet No. 3 (Babbitt) by Milton Babbitt
- String Quartet No. 3 (Bacewicz) by Grażyna Bacewicz
- String Quartet No. 3 (Bartók) by Béla Bartók
- String Quartet No. 3 (Beethoven) by Ludwig van Beethoven
- String Quartet No. 3 (Bois) by Rob du Bois
- String Quartet No. 3 (Brahms) by Johannes Brahms
- String Quartet No. 3 (Bridge) by Frank Bridge
- String Quartet No. 3 (Britten) by Benjamin Britten
- String Quartet No. 3 (Carter) by Elliott Carter
- String Quartet No. 3 (Chávez), from the ballet La hija de Cólquide by Carlos Chávez
- String Quartet No. 3 (Diamond) by David Diamond
- String Quartet No. 3 (Dvořák) by Antonín Dvořák
- String Quartet No. 3 (Ferneyhough) by Brian Ferneyhough
- String Quartet No. 3 (Halffter) by Cristóbal Halffter
- String Quartet No. 3 (Hill), The Carnival by Alfred Hill
- String Quartet No. 3 (Husa) by Karel Husa
- String Quartet No. 3 (Kirchner) by Leon Kirchner
- String Quartet No. 3 (McCabe) by John McCabe
- String Quartet No. 3 (Maconchy) by Elizabeth Maconchy
- String Quartet No. 3 (Marco), Anatomía fractal de los ángeles by Tomás Marco
- String Quartet No. 3 (Mendelssohn) by Felix Mendelssohn
- String Quartet No. 3 (Milhaud), Op. 232, by Darius Milhaud
- String Quartet No. 3 (Mozart) by Wolfgang Amadeus Mozart
- String Quartet No. 3 (Nielsen) by Carl Nielsen
- String Quartet No. 3 (Oswald) by Henrique Oswald
- String Quartet No. 3 (Parry) by Hubert Parry
- String Quartet No. 3 (Persichetti), Op. 81, by Vincent Persichetti
- String Quartet No. 3 (Piston) by Walter Piston
- String Quartet No. 3 (Porter) by Quincy Porter
- String Quartet No. 3 (Revueltas) by Silvestre Revueltas
- String Quartet No. 3 (Rihm) by Wolfgang Rihm
- String Quartet No. 3 (Rochberg) by George Rochberg
- String Quartet No. 3 (Rouse) by Christopher Rouse
- String Quartet No. 3 (Schoenberg) by Arnold Schoenberg
- String Quartet No. 3 (Schubert) by Franz Schubert
- String Quartet No. 3 (Shostakovich) by Dmitri Shostakovich
- String Quartet No. 3 (Spohr) by Louis Spohr
- String Quartet No. 3 (Tchaikovsky) by Pyotr Ilyich Tchaikovsky
- String Quartet No. 3 (Tippett) by Michael Tippett
- String Quartet No. 3 (Villa-Lobos) by Heitor Villa-Lobos
