= Berceuse Infinie =

Orchestral composition by Christopher Rouse

Berceuse Infinie (Infinite Lullaby) is an orchestral composition by the American composer Christopher Rouse. The work was commissioned by the Baltimore Symphony Orchestra and was completed on July 1, 2016. It was first performed by the Baltimore Symphony Orchestra under the direction of Marin Alsop at Joseph Meyerhoff Symphony Hall on November 30, 2017. The piece is dedicated to Marin Alsop.

== Composition ==
=== Background ===
Rouse drew his initial inspiration for Berceuse Infinie from the Italian composer Ferruccio Busoni's piece Berceuse élégiaque. In the score's program notes, the composer wrote, "My work is intended as a largely tonal, contemplative piece lasting about thirteen minutes. The 'rocking motion' so typical of the lullaby is almost always present, and despite a few isolated more dramatic moments Berceuse Infinie is largely introspective and, I hope, consoling in tone."

Rouse also arranged a wind ensemble version of Berceuse Infinie, which he dedicated to the memory of his late friend and fellow composer Steven Stucky.

=== Instrumentation ===
The work is scored for an orchestra consisting of two flutes, two oboes, two clarinets, two bassoons, two horns, two trumpets, three trombones, timpani, two percussionists, harp, celesta, and strings. Additionally, the score often calls for the players to produce audible sighs.

== Reception ==
Reviewing the world premiere, the music critic Tim Smith of The Baltimore Sun described the piece as "a spellbinding, not necessarily soothing lullaby for adults. Punctuated by the eerie sound of orchestra members exhaling, the music suggests a reflection on how fragile and temporal our existence is, but still, somehow, keeps renewing." He continued, "Right from the ruminative opening, which includes the first of the exhaled sighs, Rouse grabs the ear with at once dark and beautiful melodic ideas that emerge from a kind of mist. They are given a gently rocking rhythmic pulse that holds the roughly 15-minute score together." Charles T. Downey of the Washington Classical Review similarly observed, "Rather than a barnstorming concert opener, this meditative piece explores several oscillating motifs put through an array of orchestral colors. The work begins and ends on a unison note, first heard in the back desks of the second violin section, an almost disembodied presence. In what becomes a repeated thematic element, the orchestra collectively exhaled audibly over this backdrop, a sound evoking a maternal sigh, uttered perhaps by the universe."
