= Concert de Gaudí =

Grammy award winning concerto for guitar and orchestra by Christopher Rouse

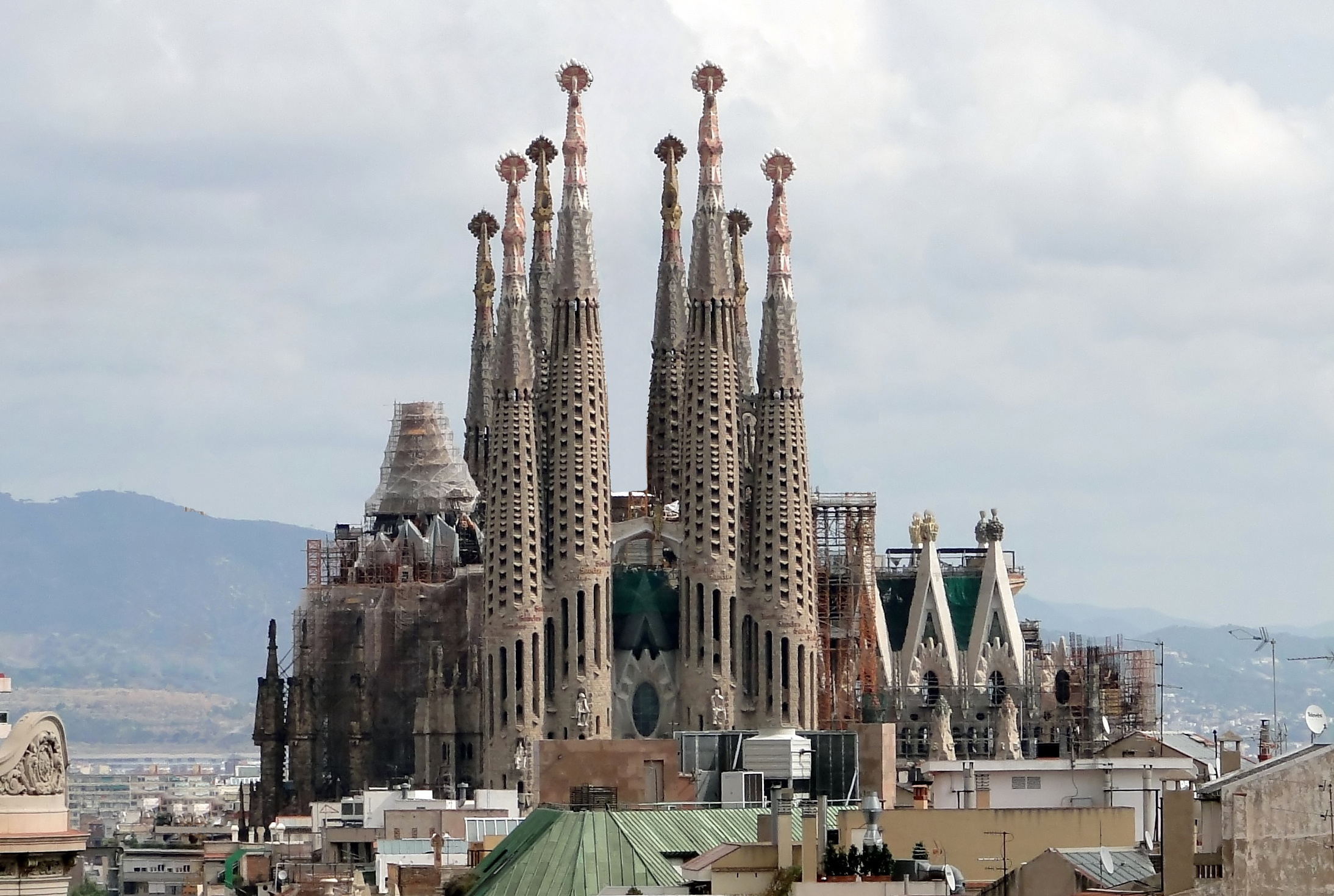
Concert de Gaudí was inspired by the works of the Spanish architect Antoni Gaudí such as the Sagrada Família in Barcelona (pictured).

Concert de Gaudí is a concerto for classical guitar and orchestra by the American composer Christopher Rouse. The work was jointly commissioned by Norddeutscher Rundfunk and the Dallas Symphony Orchestra for the guitarist Sharon Isbin, with additional contributions from Richard and Jody Nordlof, to whom the piece is dedicated. It was completed August 1, 1999, and premiered in Hamburg, January 2, 2000, with Isbin and the Norddeutscher Rundfunk Orchester led by conductor Christoph Eschenbach. The piece was later awarded the 2002 Grammy Award for Best Classical Contemporary Composition.

== Composition ==
=== Structure ===
Concert de Gaudí has a duration of roughly 25 minutes and is composed in three movements:

1. Allegro
2. Largo sereno
3. Svolazzante

=== Influences ===
The piece was inspired by the work of the Spanish architect Antoni Gaudí, after whom the concerto is titled. Rouse wrote of this inspiration in the score program notes, saying:

In conceiving a guitar concerto, my thoughts went immediately to the great Spanish tradition of music for this instrument, and it seemed logical for me to exhibit my admiration for this tradition in my own composition. This in turn led me to reflect upon the work of the extraordinary Catalan architect Antoni Gaudí, hence the Catalan-language title for the concerto. What has always struck me particularly strongly about Gaudí is his quintessentially Spanish combination of surrealism and mysticism, and I strove to include these elements in this score. Towards this end, I used that music which most might well recognize as archetypically Spanish — flamenco — as a foundation for the score. I then proceeded to "melt," "bend," and otherwise transform this material into something I hoped would be musically akin to the way in which Gaudí would take a traditional design and add fanciful, phantasmagoric touches to make it unlike the work of any other architect. As a result, there is an intentionally "unfocused" quality to the musical language of my piece, which ranges from clear, traditional tonality to music of substantive chromaticism.

=== Instrumentation ===
Concert de Gaudí is scored for solo guitar and orchestra comprising two flutes (2nd doubling piccolo), two oboes, two clarinets, two bassoons, two French horns, two trumpets, three trombones, harp, celesta, timpani, three percussionists (tambourine, tenor drum, bass drum, castanets, wood block, rute, suspended cymbal, Chinese cymbal, triangle, tam-tam, xylophone, marimba, and antique cymbals), and strings.

== Reception ==
Tim Smith of The Baltimore Sun lauded the work, writing, "From the first percussive measures, it's clear that flamenco is very much on Rouse's mind. He gives the guitar lots of flamenco riffs, propels much of the music with flamenco rhythms. Passionately lyrical melodies and a few big, juicy, traditional harmonic progressions also help to give the work an old-fashioned flavor. But the composer adds plenty of his own spice to the mix, creating a concerto with a distinctive personality." Daniel Buckley of the Tucson Citizen wrote, "Quiet and reflective to spell-like and mysterious, the 1999 score features beautiful writing for both the solo instrument and the orchestra. The orchestration is intimate and exotic, yet direct and lovely in its tonal support." John Henken of the Los Angeles Times praised the balance of the piece and wrote, "In the first movement, that seemed to mean a collage of guitaristic gestures, more desultory than surreal. The slow movement, though, is a haunted, brooding gem of texture and tune. The finale, with its bluesy bent notes and big cadenza, is the most overtly demonstrative." Gramophone declared the piece to be "as spectacular and unconventional as its eponym’s cathedral in Barcelona" and added, "It is perhaps the most remarkable work yet written for guitar and orchestra."

== Recordings ==
- Sharon Isbin, guitar, Gulbenkian Orchestra, Muhai Tang, conductor. Hamburg, Germany: Teldec New Line, 2001. Recorded live, May 2000, Gulbenkian Grand Auditorium, Lisbon. OCLC 47135957 Grammy Award in 2002 for Best Classical Contemporary Composition, and a 2002 Echo Klassik Award for Best Concert Recording.
