= Envoi (composition) =

Orchestral composition by Christopher Rouse

Envoi is a single-movement orchestral composition by the American composer Christopher Rouse. The work was commissioned by the Atlanta Symphony Orchestra with additional contributions from Thurmond Smithgall. It was first performed May 9, 1996, in Atlanta Symphony Hall, Atlanta by the Atlanta Symphony Orchestra under conductor Yoel Levi. The piece is dedicated to Rouse's mother, who died in the summer of 1993.

== Composition ==
Envoi has a duration of approximately 20 minutes and is composed in a single adagio movement. Rouse described his inspiration for the work in the score program notes, writing:

Though long an admirer of Richard Strauss' music, I have always been more attracted to the twenty-five-year-old composer's program for Death and Transfiguration than to his actual musical realization of it. In the five years preceding the composition of Envoi, I lost a number of dear friends — Stephen Albert, William Schuman, Andrzej Panufnik, Aaron Copland, and Leonard Bernstein, for example — and they were memorialized in a variety of scores I composed between 1990 and 1995. A blow of a different sort occurred with the death of my mother in the summer of 1993, and to remember her I found myself returning to Strauss' program from a century before.

He continued:

In conceiving this twenty minute work, I decided to dispense with one important aspect of Strauss' program; in Death and Transfiguration, the hero on his deathbed struggles violently against his fate before his spiritual transfiguration at the moment of death. In planning Envoi, I recalled that those whose deaths I have witnessed (including my mother) did not struggle but rather, in effect, seemed to slowly recede from life, much as a ship sails ever more far away until it disappears over the horizon. I thus elected to avoid the use of any sort of "struggle music" and in the process found myself eschewing the presence of fast-tempo material; resultantly, Envoi, like my Symphony No. 1 and Iscariot, is a single-movement adagio.

Rouse likened the work spiritually to his 1992 Violoncello Concerto as a meditation on death, but remarked, "I also believe that this work will set the seal, for a time at least, on my scores which have been composed as a response to death — I hope so, at any rate."

=== Instrumentation ===
The work is scored for an orchestra comprising two flutes, two oboes, two clarinets (2nd doubling bass clarinet), four French horns, three trumpets, four trombones, tuba, timpani, three percussionists, harp, and strings.

== Reception ==
Dan Tucker of the Chicago Tribune praised Envoi as "an impressive piece" and wrote:

The music grieves in unaccustomed ways: slow, barely audible pulsings, growls or grunts from double basses, notes that sag and slump, groans from trombone and tuba, thundering storm-clouds of dissonant tones, keenings in the violins in such a stratospheric range that even the CSO's players weren't quite uniform in pitch.

Joshua Kosman of the San Francisco Chronicle described it as "a slow elegy to the composer's mother that concludes with a delicate stretch of transfiguration". Janos Gereben of the San Francisco Classical Voice wrote, "Rouse first portrays the stopping of the heart in his own way (not as an imitation of the Mahler Ninth) and then follows up with a superb extended passage that grabs the listener and stays with him long after the concert". He added, "Instead of transcendence, Envoi presents a resigned, accepting lament, a gentle meandering night music."
