= Flute Concerto (Rouse) =

Concerto for flute and orchestra by Christopher Rouse

The Flute Concerto is a concerto for flute and orchestra by American composer Christopher Rouse. The work was jointly commissioned by Richard and Jody Nordlof for flautist Carol Wincenc and by Borders for the Detroit Symphony Orchestra. It was completed August 15, 1993, and premiered on October 27, 1994, at Orchestra Hall in Detroit, with conductor Hans Vonk leading Carol Wincenc and the Detroit Symphony Orchestra. The piece's third movement is dedicated to the memory of James Bulger, an English toddler who was murdered in 1993 by two ten-year-old boys.

== Composition ==
=== Structure ===
A performance of the Flute Concerto lasts approximately 23 minutes. The work is composed in five movements:

1. Amhrán
2. Alla Marcia
3. Elegia
4. Scherzo
5. Amhrán

=== Style and influences ===
The work contains a number of Celtic music influences. In the program notes to the score, Rouse commented on the particularly Irish influences, saying:

The first and last movements bear the title 'Amhrán' (Gaelic for 'song') and are simple melodic elaborations for the solo flute over the accompaniment of orchestral strings. They were intended in a general way to evoke the traditions of Celtic, especially Irish, folk music but to couch the musical utterance in what I hoped would seem a more spiritual, even metaphysical, manner through the use of extremely slow tempi, perhaps not unlike some of the recordings of the Irish singer Enya. The second and fourth movements are both fast in tempo. The second is a rather sprightly march which shares some of its material with the fourth, a scherzo which refers more and more as it progresses to that most Irish of dances, the jig. However, by the time the jig is stated in its most obvious form, the tempo has increased to the point that the music seems almost frantic and breathless in nature

=== Instrumentation ===
The concerto is scored for a solo flute and orchestra comprising three flutes, two oboes, two clarinets, two bassoons (2nd doubling on contrabassoon), four French horns, two trumpets, three trombones, tuba, harp, timpani, percussion (three players), strings (violins I & II, violas, violoncellos, and double basses).

== Dedication ==
Regarding the dedication of the piece to James Bulger, Rouse wrote:

In a world of daily horrors too numerous and enormous to comprehend en masse, it seems that only isolated, individual tragedies serve to sensitize us to the potential harm man can do to his fellow. For me, one such instance was the abduction and brutal murder of the two-year old English lad James Bulger at the hands of a pair of ten-year old boys. I followed this case closely during the time I was composing my concerto and was unable to shake the horror of these events from my mind. The central movement of this work is an elegy dedicated to James Bulger's memory, a small token of remembrance for a life senselessly and cruelly snuffed out.

== Reception ==
Geoffrey Norris of Gramophone praised the piece, saying, "It expresses the shock and incomprehension that we all experienced at that appalling, senseless crime, but at the same time it enshrines the beauty and innocence of an infant life so cruelly snuffed out." Michael Tumelty of The Herald lavished the work with praise, saying "...not only is it a brilliant concert piece [...], but it is actually a masterpiece." Tumelty specifically praised the third movement, adding, "In the achingly poignant music of that Elegy, there are two purely orchestral moments, where first the music subsides then, gathering its passion and strength, resumes its statement in a huge crescendo with the entire orchestra piling in at what amounts to an anguished, collective protest at the horror. It is a shattering moment." James R. Oestreich of The New York Times also noted the third movement, calling it "the big, pulsating heart of the piece" and writing, "This is a deeply stirring monument, carried for long moments by the strings and, eventually, the whole orchestra, as the flute basically steps aside." BBC Music Magazine's Stephen Maddock praised the influence of Celtic music, commenting, "The outer movements – both entitled ‘Ànhran’, Gaelic for song, in recognition of the composer’s Celtic roots – are especially likeable, while the central Adagio confronts the terrible Bulger case more in sorrow than in anger."

Michael Dervan of The Irish Times was somewhat more critical of the concerto and called it "all a bit self-consciously accessible." Steve Metcalf of the Hartford Courant called the piece "a slighter work" in regards to Rouse's repertoire, but nevertheless described it as "nicely put together." In 2006, David Patrick Stearns of The Philadelphia Inquirer lauded the relevance of the concerto in a post-9/11 world, despite describing Rouse's use of Celtic influences as "without irony" and noting similarities to Henryk Górecki's Symphony No. 3. Stearns ultimately called the concerto "an island of truth" and complimented the flute writing, saying, "The five-movement piece positions the soloist more as a protagonist than a competitor with a series of dialogues and soliloquies."
