= Phaethon (composition) =

Symphonic poem by Christopher Rouse

Phaethon is a symphonic poem by the American composer Christopher Rouse. The work was commissioned in celebration of the United States Bicentennial by the Philadelphia Orchestra with contributions from Johnson & Higgins. It was completed on February 22, 1986, and was given its world premiere at the Academy of Music in Philadelphia by the Philadelphia Orchestra under the direction of Riccardo Muti on January 8, 1987. It is dedicated in memory of the crew of the Space Shuttle Challenger, which broke apart on the morning of January 28, 1986 while Rouse was composing the piece. Since its premiere, Phaethon has become one of Rouse's most popular orchestral compositions.

== Composition ==
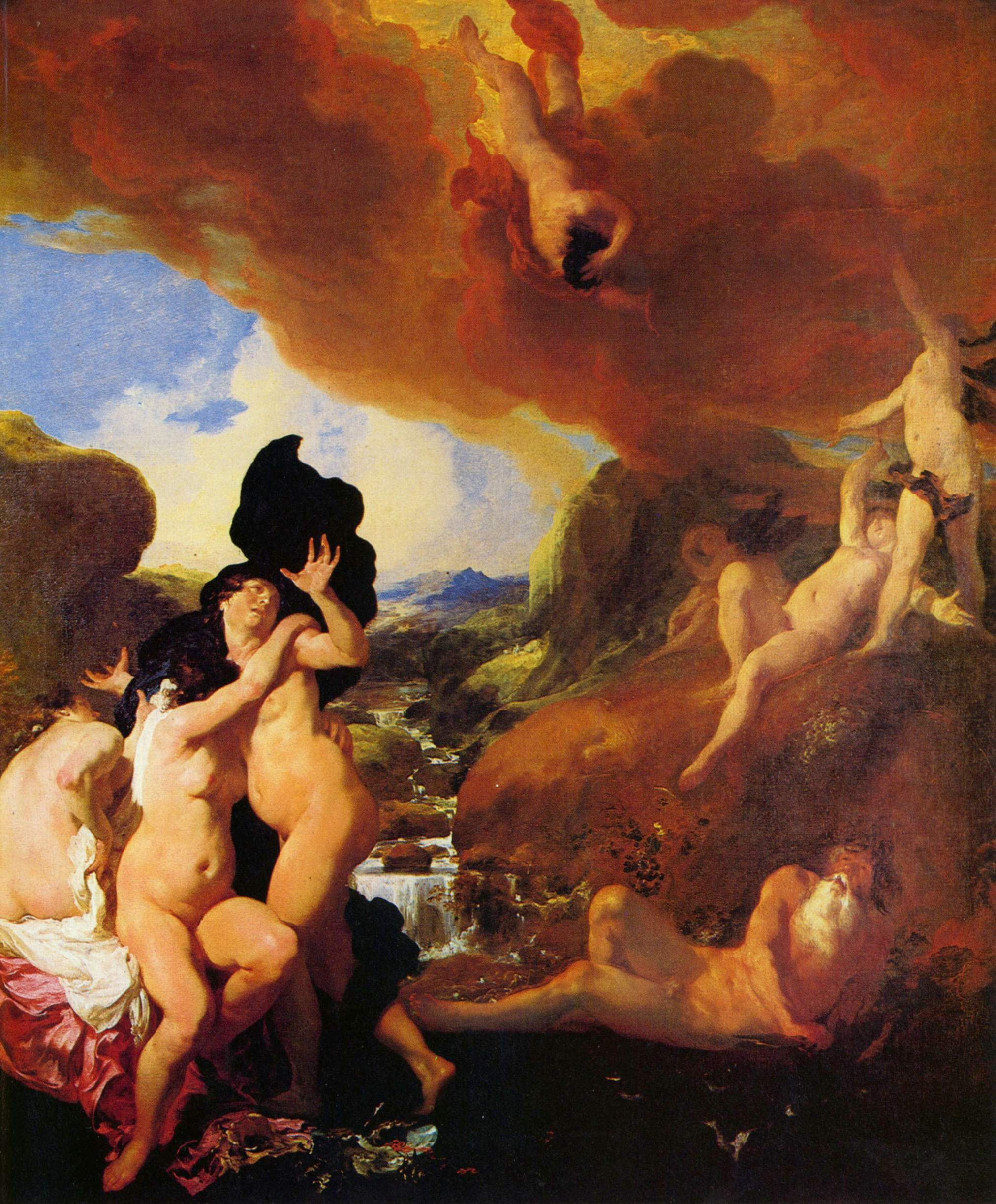
The fall of Phaethon, Johann Liss, early 17th century.

Phaethon is composed in a single movement and has a duration of approximately 6 minutes.

=== Background ===
Phaethon was inspired by the story of the eponymous Phaethon from Greek mythology. Rouse described the narrative in the score program notes, writing:

The legend tells of Phaethon, son of the sun god, Helios. The boy, after doubts had been aroused concerning his parentage, secured from his mighty father a promise that he would be allowed to demonstrate irrevocably his divine origins. Helios swore to permit such a demonstration, but he was horrified when Phaethon demanded to be allowed to guide the chariot of the sun across the sky for one day; as Helios had made his oath in the name of the river Styx, Olympian law required that he guarantee his promise. Once off, Phaethon realized quickly that he lacked the ability to control his father's horses, which dashed madly across the sky. They hurtled too close to the earth, set its land aflame, and dried up its rivers. They raced through the universe and finally threatened even Olympus itself, forcing Zeus to destroy Phaethon by hurling at him a thunderbolt which knocked him from the chariot to his death.

The story had previous been set to music by the French composer Camille Saint-Saëns in his 1873 tone poem Phaéton. However, where Saint-Saëns's piece detailed the full story, Rouse's work concerns only Phaethon's ride itself.

In a pre-premiere interview with Daniel Webster of The Philadelphia Inquirer, Rouse explained why the piece had no references to the United States Bicentennial for which it was commissioned, remarking, "There are no subtle references to the Constitution here. Occasional works have very short lives." He continued, "I believe the Constitution guarantees us freedoms which others don't have. I think of Shostakovich and the pressures he worked under in the Soviet Union. Here, we have no sense that we must write a work acceptable to some governmental board. The fact that there is no pressure to write a particular thing shows best the Constitution's importance to me [...] So I chose another of my lovely myths."

Rouse dedicated the piece in memory of the final crew of the Space Shuttle Challenger, also recalling in the score program notes:

In a disturbingly ironic twist, I found myself on the morning of January 28, 1986 at bar 443 of the work, the measure in which Zeus' thunderbolt knocks Phaethon from the sky, when the space shuttle Challenger exploded shortly after takeoff. Phaethon is dedicated to the memory of Judith Resnik, Gregory Jarvis, Ronald McNair, Ellison Onizuka, Michael Smith, Francis Scobee, and Christa McAuliffe -- the seven astronauts who lost their lives that morning when they, too, were knocked from the sky.

=== Instrumentation ===
The work is scored for a large orchestra consisting of three flutes (all doubling piccolos), three oboes (3rd doubling English horn), three clarinets (3rd doubling bass clarinet), three bassoons (3rd doubling contrabassoon), six horns, four trumpets, four trombones, tuba, harp, timpani, three percussionists, and strings.

== Reception ==
Reviewing the New York City premiere of Phaethon, Donal Henahan of The New York Times gave the work a mixed review, remarking, "Mr. Rouse's seven-minute tone poem met the basic requirements of its genre, though not much more." Despite describing its scenario as "promising," he added that it "testified chiefly to the composer's ability to put an orchestra in motion and keep it there without the support of a memorable musical idea."

However, the work has since garnered a more positive response from music critics. Stephen Maddock of BBC Music Magazine said it "confronts violent death in the most brutal and musically demanding way: in just eight minutes it tells of man's bravery and fall from grace." James McQuillen of The Oregonian similarly wrote, "Densely orchestrated, loud and fast, it sounded something like the demolition of a musical instrument shop over seven minutes through the precise deployment of explosive charges." Allan Kozinn of The New York Times later called Phaethon "a spectacularly noisy, colorful evocation of the Greek myth" and wrote, "continuously reconfigured textures, dynamics and timbres wove spells so magical that debates about harmonic language were beside the point."
