= String Quartet No. 1 (Rouse) =

String quartet composed in 1982

The String Quartet No. 1 is the first string quartet by the American composer Christopher Rouse. The work was commissioned by the Casella Quartet and completed on June 7, 1982.

== Composition ==
The work has a duration of roughly 16 minutes and is composed in six movements:

1. Variazioni I
2. Fantasma di Bartok I
3. Variazioni Piccoli
4. Fantasma di Bartok II
5. Variazioni II
6. Epilogo

The work was primarily inspired by Béla Bartók's String Quartet No. 4 and the assassination of Anwar Sadat, about which Rouse commented in the score program notes:

As it was conceived and largely composed in 1981, the centenary of Bartok's birth, I elected to make the quartet a conscious homage to that greatest of twentieth century quartet composers. The assassination of Anwar el-Sadat on October 6 of that year effected a partial modification of the original plan through my decision to base most of the important pitch material of the work on the initials of Sadat's name.

== Reception ==
Edward Rothstein of The New York Times praised the string quartet, remarking that "the work's outbursts seemed insistent and intemperate". Reviewing a later recording of the piece, the music critic James Manheim praised the music for "draw[ing] closely on specific models and amplify[ing] them with big, visceral effects." He added:

This works best in the String Quartet No. 1, designated an homage to Bartók and certainly animated by motor rhythms in the same way. But Rouse simplifies the intervallic content (the work's variation structures, Bartókian in their outlines, are based on an open fifth) and gives the string players a real workout in which the Calder players do not flag. It's a great deal of fun, commended especially to string players.
