= Symphony No. 2 (Rouse) =

Musical work; symphony in three movements composed by Christopher Rouse

Symphony No. 2 is a symphony in three connected movements for orchestra by the American composer Christopher Rouse. The piece was commissioned by the Houston Symphony and completed July 15, 1994. The work premiered later that year and is dedicated to then Houston Symphony director Christoph Eschenbach.

== Composition ==
The symphony has a duration of approximately 25 minutes and is composed in three connected movements:

1. Allegro
2. Adagio
3. Allegro

Rouse intended the work as a tribute to the music of composer Karl Amadeus Hartmann. Though Rouse conceived the piece concurrently with his Symphony No. 1 in the summer of 1984, he took a full decade to complete the work. The second movement, Adagio, is dedicated to Rouse's friend and fellow composer Stephen Albert, who had died December 27, 1992.

=== Instrumentation ===
The symphony is scored for piccolo, two flutes, two oboes, English horn, two clarinets, bass clarinet, three bassoons, four French horns, three trumpets, three trombones, tuba, harp, timpani (two players), percussion (three players), and strings (violins I & II, violas, violoncellos, and double basses).

== Reception ==
Stephen Wigler of The Baltimore Sun praised the symphony as "tightly constructed and fun to listen to" and added, "It was the finale, with its pile-up of ear-splitting sonorities so typical of this composer, that occasioned the catcalls from the audience. But its relentless energy was invigorating and its coda — an outburst of savage drumming — splendidly inventive." Steve Metcalf of the Hartford Courant also lauded the work, saying, "The ideas are crisp and unforced, the orchestration brilliant. It's a piece of such physical urgency that a listener finds himself literally sitting up a little straighter in response to its restless opening bars." David Gutman of Gramophone also gave the work modest praise.
