= Rapture (composition) =

Orchestral composition by Christopher Rouse

Rapture is an orchestral composition in one movement by the American composer Christopher Rouse. The work was commissioned by the Pittsburgh Symphony Orchestra and was completed January 9, 2000. It is dedicated to then Pittsburgh Symphony Orchestra music director Mariss Jansons and premiered in May 2000.

== Composition ==
Rapture is markedly more tonal than Rouse's earlier compositions. In the program notes to the score, Rouse commented, "With the exception of my Christmas work, Karolju, this is the most unabashedly tonal music I have composed. I wished to depict a progression to an ever more blinding ecstasy, but the entire work inhabits a world devoid of darkness -- hence the almost complete lack of sustained dissonance." The piece is also built around "gradually increasing tempi" gains speed over the course of its roughly 11 minutes.

Despite the religious title of the work, Rouse did not intend Rapture to be sacred music. He further commented, "...the piece is not connected to any specific religious source. Rather, I used the word 'rapture' to convey a sense of spiritual bliss, religious or otherwise."

=== Instrumentation ===
Rapture is scored for orchestra comprising three flutes, three oboes, three clarinets, three bassoons, four French horns, four trumpets, four trombones, tuba, harp, timpani (two players), three percussionists (bass drum, five triangles, tam-tam, China cymbal, suspended cymbal, chimes, glockenspiel, and antique cymbals), and strings (violins I & II, violas, violoncellos, and double basses).

== Reception ==
David Gutman of Gramophone gave the piece moderate praise, commenting, "Some readers will welcome its frank neo-romanticism. I wasn’t so sure. The piece is conceived as an increasingly active journey towards an isle of bliss that’s a good deal noisier than Rautavaara’s. In doing so it trades on Sibelian riffs and resonances with less freshness than, say, John Adams’ El Dorado." Tim Smith of The Baltimore Sun lauded the work, writing:

The score starts with low, soft rumbles and questioning melodic flurries that, as tempo and harmonic tension subtly increase, lead inexorably toward an incandescent aural light. There is something communal about the experience, as if the music is trying to pull orchestra and audience alike into some sort of benevolent maelstrom that takes you higher and higher.
