= Kabir Padavali =

Song cycle by Christopher Rouse

Kabir Padavali (Kabir Songbook) is a song cycle for soprano and orchestra set to the poetry of the Indian mystic Kabir by the American composer Christopher Rouse. The work was commissioned by the Minnesota Orchestra for the soprano Dawn Upshaw. It was first performed by Upshaw and the Minnesota Orchestra under the direction of David Zinman in Minneapolis on January 6, 1999. The piece is dedicated to the composer's son, Adrian Rouse.

== Composition ==
=== Background ===
Rouse first encountered the work of Kabir while studying North Indian classical music in the early 1970s. In 1972, Rouse composed a different piece for soprano and orchestra titled Kabir Padavali, which was never performed. Over two decades later, a commission from the Minnesota Orchestra provided him the chance to re-explore Kabir's poetry. Rouse started the composition on the new piece in 1997 and completed it at his home in Pittsford, New York, on January 12, 1998.

Rouse selected six poems on which to set his music from translations of Kabir's poetry by Linda Hess, Robert Bly, and Rabindranath Tagore. Hess and Douglas Brooks later provided the composer with transliterations for the text from Sanskrit.

Though the music is sung in Hindi, Rouse otherwise elected not to compose the piece in the style of Hindu music. He reflected in the score program notes:

Unlike my 1972 score, this Kabir Padavali does not seek to provide a "musicologically correct" sound world as accompaniment to Kabir's words. There are no specific ragas employed, nor is there an attempt to reproduce Hindu vocal styles in the piece. However, I have attempted — particularly near the beginning and end of this score — to evoke the North Indian sound world in a more general fashion through the use of drones and via several oboe solos, the oboe possessing a sound not dissimilar to that of the Indian shahnai. My use of an accordion also represents an effort to parallel the sound, to some extent, of the Indian harmonium.

=== Structure ===
Kabir Padavali has a duration of approximately 28 minutes and is cast in six movements:

1. Bijak shabda 69
2. Tagore 50
3. Bijak sabda 55
4. Bijak sabda 4
5. Tagore 92
6. Tagore 97

=== Instrumentation ===
The work is scored for solo soprano and an orchestra consisting of two flutes (2nd doubling piccolo), two oboes, two clarinets, two bassoons, four horns, two trumpets, three trombones, tuba, timpani, three percussionists, celesta, accordion, harp, and strings.

== Reception ==
=== Critical response ===
Kabir Padavali has been praised by music critics. Reviewing the world premiere, Michael Anthony of the Star Tribune called it "an ear-catching, evocative piece" and wrote, "Rouse doesn't try to reproduce ragas or Hindi vocal styles, though he uses occasional drones throughout the cycle. His goal seems to be more the creation of an exotic atmosphere than an exercise in ethnomusicology... the results are striking and beautiful throughout, from the sensuous oboe theme at the beginning (which returns at the end), to the subtle interweaving of voice and flute in the second song, to the rapturous tone of the final pages: the voice humming while the percussion makes sounds like those of rattlesnakes." The piece was later praised by Priscilla McLean of the Times Union and Geraldine Freedman of The Daily Gazette, who described the score as "complex, colorful, and rhythmically and harmonically multi-layered."

=== Awards ===
A recording of Kabir Padavali, performed by the soprano Talise Trevigne and Albany Symphony Orchestra, was nominated for the 2016 Grammy Award for Best Classical Vocal Solo.
