= Symphony No. 2 (Prokofiev) =

1925 symphony by Sergei Prokofiev

- by Sergei Prokofiev
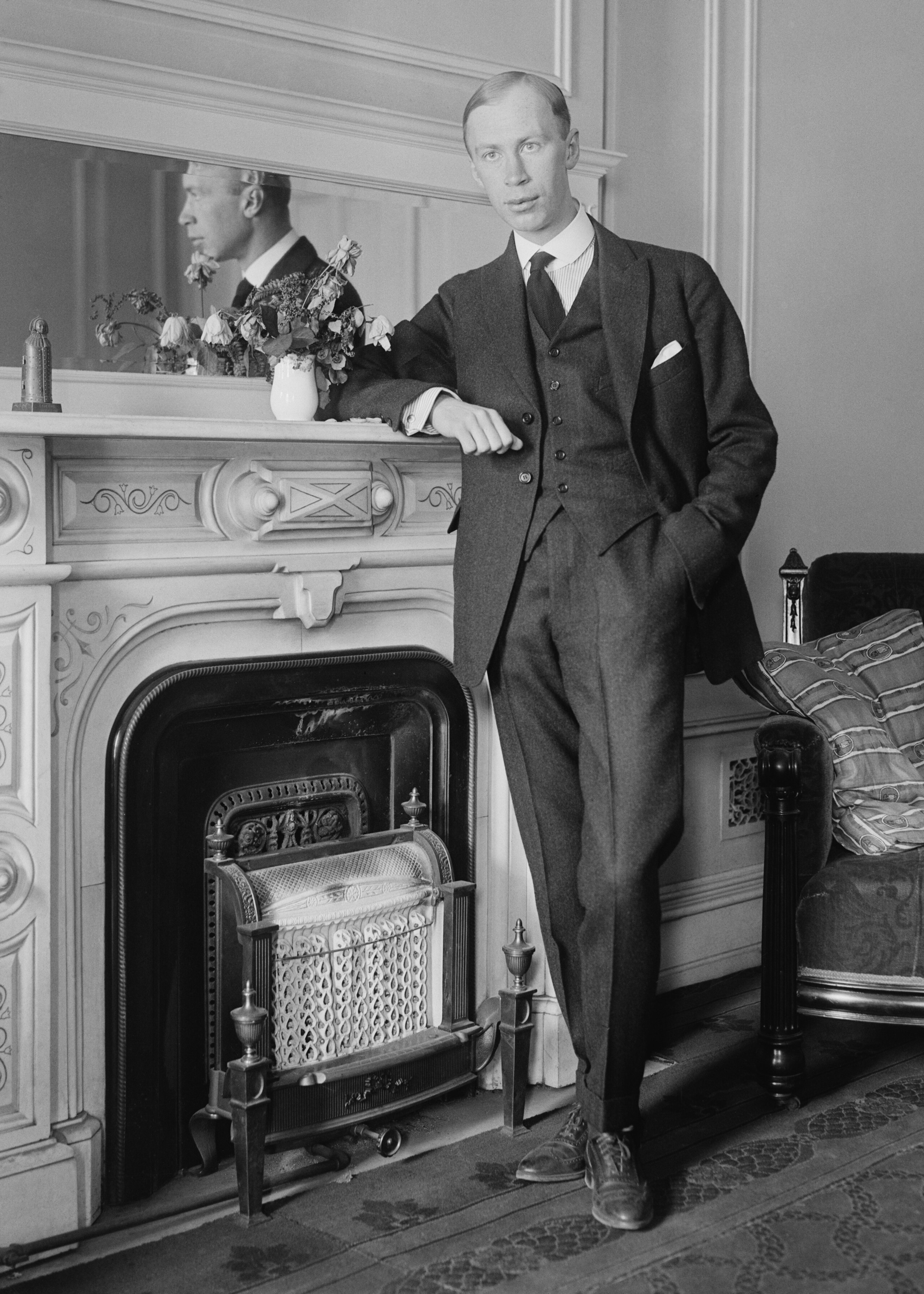
- Sergei Prokofiev, c. 1918
- Key: D minor
- Opus: 40
- Composed: 1924–25
- Dedication: Serge Koussevitzky
- Movements: Two

Premiere
- Date: June 6, 1925
- Location: Paris
- Conductor: Serge Koussevitzky

Sergei Prokofiev wrote his Symphony No. 2 in D minor, Op. 40, in Paris in 1924-25, during what he called "nine months of frenzied toil". He characterized this symphony as a work of "iron and steel".

== Structure ==
Prokofiev modeled the symphony's structure on Ludwig van Beethoven's last piano sonata (Op. 111): a tempestuous minor-key first movement followed by a set of variations. The first movement, in traditional sonata form, is rhythmically unrelenting, harmonically dissonant, and texturally thick. The second movement, twice as long as the first, comprises a set of variations on a plaintive, diatonic theme played on the oboe, which provides strong contrast to the defiant coda of the first movement. The subsequent variations contrast moments of beautiful meditation with cheeky playfulness, yet the tension of the first movement is never far away and contributes an ongoing sense of unease. The last variation integrates the theme with the violence of the first movement, reaching an inevitable climax. The symphony ends with a touching restatement of the initial oboe theme, eventually dispelled by an eerie chord on the strings.

== Premiere and public reaction ==
The piece was premiered in Paris on June 6, 1925, conducted by its dedicatee Serge Koussevitzky, and was not well received. After the premiere, Prokofiev commented that neither he nor the audience understood the piece. In a letter to Nikolai Myaskovsky, Prokofiev wrote:

I have made the music so complex to such an extent that when I listen to it myself I do not fathom its essence, so what can I ask of others?

Prokofiev later said that this symphony led him to have doubts about his ability as a composer for the first time in his life.

Prokofiev intended to reconstruct the piece in three movements, going so far as to assign the project the opus number 136, but the composer died before he could undertake the revisions. The symphony, little-known and rarely performed, remains among the least-played of Prokofiev's works. Despite the negative criticism, the contemporary composer Christopher Rouse called it "the best of all of them" in regards to Prokofiev's work, and composed his own Symphony No. 3 in homage to the piece.

== Instrumentation ==
The work is scored for the following:

Woodwinds

Piccolo
2 Flutes
2 Oboes
Cor anglais
2 Clarinets
Bass clarinet
2 Bassoons
Contrabassoon

Brass

4 Horns
3 Trumpets
3 Trombones
Tuba

Percussion

Timpani

Bass drum
Cymbals
Snare drum
Castanets
Triangle
Tambourine

Keyboards

Piano

Strings

Violins (1st and 2nd)
Violas
Cellos
Double basses

== Movements ==
External audio
- Performed by the Berlin Philharmonic under Seiji Ozawa
- I. Allegro ben articolato
- II. Theme and Variations

The symphony is in 2 movements, lasting 35–40 minutes:

- Allegro ben articolato (12 minutes)
- Theme and Variations (25 minutes)
  - Theme: Andante
  - Variation 1: L'istesso tempo
  - Variation 2: Allegro non troppo
  - Variation 3: Allegro
  - Variation 4: Larghetto
  - Variation 5: Allegro con brio
  - Variation 6: Allegro moderato
  - Theme reprise: Andante

== Recordings ==
Orchestra	Conductor	Record Company	Year of Recording	Format
Boston Symphony Orchestra	Erich Leinsdorf	Sony Classical Records (originally RCA Red Seal)	1968	CD
London Philharmonic Orchestra	Walter Weller	Decca	1978	CD
Czech Philharmonic Orchestra	Zdeněk Košler	Supraphon	1980	CD
Scottish National Orchestra	Neeme Järvi	Chandos Records	1984	CD
Orchestre National de France	Mstislav Rostropovich	Erato	1988	CD
Berlin Philharmonic	Seiji Ozawa	Deutsche Grammophon	1990	CD
National Symphony Orchestra of Ukraine	Theodore Kuchar	Naxos	1995	CD
Russian State Symphony Orchestra	Valeri Polyansky	Chandos Records	May 2001	CD
London Symphony Orchestra	Valery Gergiev	Philips	2004	CD
São Paulo State Symphony Orchestra	Marin Alsop	Naxos	2013	CD
Bournemouth Symphony Orchestra	Kirill Karabits	Onyx Records	2014	CD
Bergen Philharmonic Orchestra	Andrew Litton	BIS	2020	CD
The Cleveland Orchestra	Franz Welser-Möst	The Cleveland Orchestra	2020	CD
National Orchestra of the O.R.T.F.	Jean Martinon	Vox Records		CD
USSR Ministry of Culture State Symphony Orchestra	Gennadi Rozhdestvensky			CD/LP
