= A Dangerous Lie =

A Dangerous Lie: The Protocols of the Elders of Zion was a special exhibition about the 1903 Russian antisemitic canard, The Protocols of the Elders of Zion. The exhibit was held at the United States Holocaust Memorial in 2006.

The exhibit was curated by Daniel Greene.

== Critical reception ==
Edward Rothstein criticized the exhibit for failing to explore the idea that the protocols were actually written by Mathieu Golovinski, a Russian-French political activist, for failing to help viewers understand the nature of the text, and for failing to discuss contemporary use of this forgery by contemporary antisemitic governments.

The exhibit explained that in the early 20th century and during Hitler's rise to power in Germany, it was widely accepted that the Protocols documented an actual conspiracy by a small cabal of Jews to control the world for nefarious purposes, and that government and media in some countries continue to promote the Protocols as proof that such a Jewish conspiracy to control the world exists. It details the manner in which Henry Ford was responsible for popularizing the fake Protocols in his newspaper, The Dearborn Independent.
