= Rotae Passionis =

Chamber composition by Christopher Rouse

Rotae Passionis ('Passion Wheels') is a piece for mixed chamber ensemble by the American composer Christopher Rouse. It was commissioned by Boston Musica Viva and completed in 1983, when the work was first performed. It is dedicated to Carl Orff, who died the previous year.

== Instrumentation ==
The work is scored for seven players:

1. flute (doubling piccolo and alto flute)
2. clarinet (doubling E-flat and bass clarinets)
3. percussion
4. piano
5. violin
6. viola
7. cello

At certain points in the work, the wind players and the pianist are also required to play percussion instruments.

== Structure ==
The work consists of three parts, each representing an element of the Passion story:

1. Circuitus Lamentationis - Dolor in Horto (Agony in the Garden)
2. Rotae Passionis (Passion Wheels) (based on the Fourteen Stations of the Cross)
3. Rota Parallela - Christus in Somno

Inspiration for the composition was derived from Northern Renaissance art, in particular the works of Hieronymus Bosch and Matthias Grünewald. The approach of these artists to the subject of the Crucifixion appealed to Rouse because they conveyed the anguish of the Passion more emphatically than their Italian counterparts. Each part of the work can therefore be interpreted as a panel from a triptych altarpiece.

Material in the composition is developed in a circular fashion, hence the 'wheel' concept: this notion was also inspired by the 'Rota Fortunae' of Orff's Carmina Burana.
