= The Nevill Feast =

Orchestral composition by Christopher Rouse

The Nevill Feast is a single-movement orchestral composition by the American composer Christopher Rouse. The work was commissioned by the Boston Pops Orchestra and completed in February 2003. It was first performed May 7, 2003, by conductor Keith Lockhart and the Boston Pops Orchestra, both to whom the work is dedicated.

== Composition ==
The Nevill Feast is composed in a single movement and has a duration of roughly 8 minutes. The work is inspired by great feasts of the Middle Ages and Renaissance, specifically that of the archbishop of York George Neville upon his ascension to the post. Rouse wrote of this event in the score program notes:

George Nevill was elevated to the archbishopric of York in 1465 — perhaps tellingly, this occurred in the midst of the Wars of the Roses between the Houses of Lancaster and York — and the feast held that year in his honor has come down to us as one of the most sumptuous and enormous of all such feasts. A substantial variety of birds were served, including gannets, gulls, sparrows, peacocks, and larks. Other items offered included six wild bulls, one hundred thirteen oxen, one thousand sheep, and thirteen porpoises. Also on hand were two thousand each of chickens, geese, and pigs. Over two thousand guests reportedly attended, and the feast lasted for several days.

Rouse described the piece as "a brief (...) score intended simply to entertain."

=== Instrumentation ===
The work is scored for an orchestra comprising piccolo, two flutes, three oboes, two clarinets, bass clarinet, three bassoons (3rd doubling contrabassoon), four French horns, three trumpets, three trombones, tuba, harp, electric bass, timpani, three percussionists, and strings.

== Reception ==
Mark Kanny of the Pittsburgh Tribune-Review remarked that the piece "takes a noted Medieval English celebration as an excuse for party music." He continued, "The jaunty main theme — very simple and repeated a lot — is offset by contrasting ideas, one of which includes a bass guitar part." Gabriel Kanengiser of The Oberlin Review was more critical, however, writing, "The piece featured uninteresting melodies that were not executed with the virtuosity expected of Conservatory students, but with the virtuosity of a practical joke—a joke completely missed by the audience."
