= Der gerettete Alberich =

Percussion concerto by Christopher Rouse

Der gerettete Alberich (Alberich Saved) is a concerto for percussion and orchestra by the American composer Christopher Rouse. The work was jointly commissioned by the London Symphony Orchestra, the Cleveland Orchestra, the Philadelphia Orchestra, and the Baltimore Symphony Orchestra. It was completed June 7, 1997, and premiered January 15, 1998, in Cleveland, Ohio with the Cleveland Orchestra under conductor Christoph von Dohnányi. The piece is dedicated to percussionist Evelyn Glennie, who performed the solo during the world premiere. Rouse composed the work as an informal musical sequel to Richard Wagner's four-opera cycle Der Ring des Nibelungen.

== Composition ==
=== Style and inspiration ===
Rouse conceived Der gerettete Alberich as a fantasy on the adventures of villainous dwarf Alberich after the apocalyptic conclusion of Richard Wagner's Götterdämmerung, last in the four-opera cycle Der Ring des Nibelungen. Thus, the work freely quotes passages from Der Ring des Nibelungen, beginning with the ending coda of Götterdämmerung, as Alberich's exploits are musically detailed. The piece also contains a rock and roll drum solo that has been compared to the style of Led Zeppelin. In the score program notes, Rouse commented on the inception of the piece, saying:

As Alberich's whereabouts are unknown at the end of the Ring, it occurred to me that it might be engaging to return him to the stage, so to speak, so that he might wreak further havoc in what is quite literally the godless world in which Wagner has left us in the final pages of Götterdämmerung. The result was Der gerettete Alberich, whose title might best be translated as 'Alberich Saved,' itself a reference to Georg Kaiser's expressionist play Der gerettete Alkibiades.

Rouse also described Der gerettete Alberich as being "looser architecturally" than his other concerti and characterized it as "more of a fantasy for solo percussionist and orchestra on themes of Wagner, with the soloist taking on the 'role' of Alberich."

=== Instrumentation ===
Der gerettete Alberich is scored for a solo percussionist and orchestra comprising piccolo, two flutes, three oboes, three clarinets, three bassoons, six French horns, three trumpets, three trombones, tuba, harp, timpani, three percussionists (chimes, antique cymbals, xylophone, castanets, tam-tam, bass drum, suspended cymbal, four tom-toms, anvil, and thunder sheet), and strings (violins I & II, violas, violoncellos, and double basses). The soloist's percussion battery consists of four wood blocks, four log drums, four tom-toms, two bongo drums, two timbales, snare drum, steel drum, marimba, two güiros, pedal-operated bass drum, and a drum kit.

== Reception ==
Mark Swed of the Los Angeles Times praised the concerto, saying, "...Rouse has a knack for outlandish gestures, a deep and abiding love of rock 'n' roll, a competitive obsession with getting orchestras to play louder than they ever have in the past, and a sense of humor. 'Alberich,' or whatever one should call the score for short, is a riot, in more ways than one." Allan Kozinn of The New York Times also lauded the work, saying, "The notion of writing a sequel to Wagner's Götterdämmerung, and casting it as a percussion concerto, may seem odd, but it is vintage Christopher Rouse. In Der Gerettete Alberich, a virtuosic percussion line portrays the title role, supported by a rich orchestral score that quotes Ring motifs and Led Zeppelin." The Philadelphia Inquirer's David Patrick Stearns said of the work, "Even if it's not among my favorite Rouse pieces, it displays his ever-engaging personality, with intense, eerie stillness followed by explosions seemingly inspired by Led Zeppelin, whose late drummer John Bonham cast a welcome shadow over the piece." Stearns added, "The Wagner quotes are still there - especially the music Alberich sings when he renounces love for gold - but they're twisted around, Alberich-like, firsthand expressions of the character rather than an outside observation of him. It's as if he finally nabbed the ring that will let him rule the world - and is ruling it." Tim Smith of The Baltimore Sun gave lukewarm praise to the work, writing, "Some of what ensues in Der gerettete Alberich ('Alberich Saved') is a little obvious, even a little odd — a rock music outburst seems more tacked on than organic — but the finely structured, prismatically orchestrated piece adds up to a clever, rousing mini-epic."

David Gutman of Gramophone, however, was much more critical of the piece. Despite referring to the scoring as "blatant but imaginative," he opined:

As is typical of the new wave of percussion concertos, Der gerettete Alberich (1997) works well enough in live performance where the physical theatre of a hyperactive soloist helps offset the unavoidable diffuseness of what one actually hears. Without the visuals it is more difficult to know how to take the piece. In plundering Alberich’s themes from Wagner’s Ring for his raw material, the composer doesn’t seem to be setting up any sort of meaningful critique or dialectic. The music begins with the euphonious close of Götterdämmerung and ends with the pedal E flat which opens Das Rheingold. Are we to infer that ‘Alberich Saved’, whether by accident or design, has reversed time and put the world to rights?

In programming a 2013 concert celebrating the bicentennial of Richard Wagner's birth, conductor Marin Alsop said of Der gerettete Alberich:

Rouse begins with the same music that closes the Ring. Then, Alberich appears in the form of a raspy guiro (the Latin American percussion instrument). The concerto takes us through many twists and turns — including a stint for Alberich as a 1970s rock 'n' roll drummer. It's all musically motivated and derived from Wagner's own music, brilliantly contorted and disguised by Rouse, and designed to showcase the virtuosity of the percussion soloist. This piece creates over-the-top excess for our own time.
