= Seeing (composition) =

Piano concerto by Christopher Rouse

Seeing is a concerto for solo piano and orchestra by the American composer Christopher Rouse. The work was commissioned by the New York Philharmonic for the pianist Emanuel Ax, with financial contributions from philanthropists Lillian and Maurice Barbash. It was premiered at Avery Fisher Hall in New York City May 6, 1999, with Leonard Slatkin conducting Emanuel Ax and the New York Philharmonic. The piece is dedicated to Emanuel Ax.

== Composition ==
The piece has a duration of roughly 28 minutes and is composed in four connected sections, similar to the form of a traditional concerto.

=== Style and influences ===
The composition freely quotes passages from Robert Schumann's Piano Concerto. Rouse wrote of this in the score program notes:

In early discussions with Emanuel Ax, I discovered that he had never publicly performed (and had no future plans to perform) the piano concerto of Robert Schumann, a work he deeply loved but which he felt, due to his extraordinary modesty, unable to do justice to. I immediately resolved to include snippets of the Schumann concerto in my score as something of a "private joke."

The title of the piece comes from the song "Seeing" in the Moby Grape album Moby Grape '69. Rouse saw the album while browsing through his collection of rock music and "was struck by the combination of simplicity and vision symbolized by this title." Rouse used this to extrapolate the conception of the work, later writing:

Some months later I was browsing in a bookstore and came across a book detailing the current activities of various figures in the rock music world of the 1960s. As I came upon the Moby Grape entry, I discovered that Skip Spence had for some time been institutionalized as irretrievably psychotic, and this led me to reflect further upon Robert Schumann's own institutionalization for psychosis. These strands now came together and my conception for the composition took form. How do the mentally ill "see" — not in the purely ocular sense but rather in the psychological and spiritual sense? How do they interpret what they see? And how can a representation of these "images" be translated into sound?

As to whether the piece has any programmatic intent, Rouse specified:

It is important for the listener to realize that Seeing is not a narratively programmatic piece. There is no "protagonist" — real or imagined — and no series of events is depicted in the music. Instead, it was my plan to explore the notion of "sanity" via swings back and forth between extremes of consonance and dissonance, stability and instability. My intent was to compose a unified and coherent work about confusion. Seeing does not "take a stand" upon mental illness as a social cause; rather, I wished to concern myslf with the tragic toll such afflictions can take upon individual persons and those who care for them.

=== Instrumentation ===
Seeing is scored for solo piano and an orchestra comprising three flutes, three oboes (3rd doubling English horn), three clarinets (3rd doubling bass clarinet), three bassoons, four French horns, three trumpets, three trombones, tuba, celesta, timpani, three percussionists, and strings.

== Reception ==
Reviewing the world premiere, Allan Kozinn of The New York Times called the work "a colorful, thorny, eclectic imagining of psychosis" and wrote:

Mostly it is a tragic piece, something signaled unequivocally by the fortissimo A minor orchestral chords that open the work, with dissonant punctuation from the piano. As the work unfolds, there is an almost pictorial distinction between the piano and orchestral writing. It is as if the piano is the disturbed composer making his way in the world, sometimes in fits of energy, sometimes in more lyrical ruminations, and the orchestra, with its blasts of brass figuration, wild wind and percussion and bass figures played with the lethargic sound of a tape played at half speed, represents the protagonist's idiosyncratic perceptions.

Tim Page of The Washington Post similarly praised Seeing as "a work of dark, brooding fancy." He further remarked, "It is a substantial piece but not at all comfortable to listen to: One struggles through passages of furious and magnificent noise, to be rewarded, on occasion, with moments of serene and gossamer beauty, appreciating them all the more for their scarcity." Matthew Rye of The Daily Telegraph called the piece an "intriguing, if bizarre new work."

Keith Potter of The Independent was much more critical, however, writing:

For me, Seeing was a dismayingly dull half hour, enlivened though it was by Ax's persuasive playing. Rouse is a very capable orchestrator, but his more idiosyncratic timbral effects (trombonists playing glissandi into timpani skins was the most obvious) remain – even in the slow section, most successful of the four – merely fancy effects stuck on to a very traditional, not to say clichéd kind of discourse.
