= Concerto for Orchestra (Rouse) =

Concerto by Christopher Rouse

The Concerto for Orchestra is an orchestral composition by the American composer Christopher Rouse. The work was commissioned by the Cabrillo Festival of Contemporary Music and is dedicated to conductor and frequent Rouse collaborator Marin Alsop. The piece was completed February 24, 2008 and premiered at the festival August 1, 2008, with Marin Alsop leading the Cabrillo Festival Orchestra.

== Composition ==
=== Structure ===
The Concerto for Orchestra is composed in two "halves" played without pause. A performance of the work lasts approximately 28 minutes. In the program notes to the Concerto for Orchestra, Rouse commented on the unique form of the piece, saying:

Having composed ten other concerti prior to this one, I have always had to wrestle with finding an effective form for the piece. Here I wanted to depart from the standard three or four movement concerto and construct something different. I decided to divide the concerto into connected halves (the term being used loosely). The first half would be made up of five rather brief sections — fast, slow, fast, slow, fast — in which the fast parts would share and develop the same musical material, while the slow ones would share and explore different material. The second half would consist of two sections, a slow one and a fast one, each meant to represent a sort of "full blossoming" of the related ideas from their counterparts earlier on. My hope was to draw the listener in more and more as the work progressed, with the final allegro building to a frenzied, almost hysterical, climax.

=== Instrumentation ===
The Concerto for Orchestra is scored for an orchestra comprising three flutes (3rd doubling piccolo), three oboes (3rd doubling English horn), two clarinets, bass clarinet (doubling piccolo clarinet), two bassoons, contrabassoon, four French horns, three trumpets, three trombones, tuba, harp, timpani, percussion (four players), and strings.

== Reception ==
Joshua Kosman of San Francisco Chronicle called the piece "...a boisterous, exhilarating concoction, in which fiercely patterned rhythmic explosions alternate with lyrical interludes headed by the strings, and as the title suggests, it's a display piece for the orchestra members." Scott MacClelland of Metro Silicon Valley similarly praised the work, saying, "Christopher Rouse's Concerto for Orchestra, composed with dazzling virtuosity, gave Marin Alsop's musicians a showpiece of fierce demands and breathtaking execution. Like Bartók's eponymous opus, it challenges every member of the orchestra and rewards each with at least cameos." MacClelland further remarked, "...for all the dizzying activity, colors and effects, Rouse delivered this commission with an idiomatic mastery of the instruments and categorical style integrity. The work is an orchestral masterpiece and deserves ongoing exposure. Having paid for it, the festival should consider releasing this performance commercially."
