= Christopher Rouse (composer) =

American composer (1949–2019)

- Christopher Rouse, c. 2000
- Born: Christopher Chapman Rouse III; February 15, 1949; Baltimore, Maryland, U.S.
- Died: September 21, 2019 (aged 70); Towson, Maryland, U.S.
- Education: Oberlin Conservatory of Music; Cornell University
- Occupations: Composer, professor
- Awards: Kennedy Center Friedheim Award (1988); Grammy Award for Best Classical Contemporary Composition (2002); Pulitzer Prize for Music (1993)

Christopher Chapman Rouse III (February 15, 1949 – September 21, 2019) was an American composer. Though he wrote for various ensembles, Rouse is primarily known for his orchestral compositions, including a Requiem, a dozen concertos, and six symphonies. His work received numerous accolades, including the Kennedy Center Friedheim Award, the Grammy Award for Best Classical Contemporary Composition, and the Pulitzer Prize for Music. He also served as the composer-in-residence for the New York Philharmonic from 2012 to 2015.

== Biography ==
Rouse was born in Baltimore, Maryland, the son of Christopher Rouse Jr., a salesman at Pitney Bowes, and Margorie or Margery Rouse, a radiology secretary. He studied with Richard Hoffmann at Oberlin Conservatory of Music, graduating in 1971. He later completed graduate degrees under Karel Husa at Cornell University in 1977. In between, Rouse studied privately with George Crumb.

Early recognition came from the BMI Foundation's BMI Student Composer Awards in 1972 and 1973. Rouse taught at the University of Michigan from 1978 to 1981, where he was also a Junior Fellow in the university's Society of Fellows and at the Eastman School of Music from 1981 to 2002. Beginning in 1997, he taught at the Juilliard School.

Rouse's Symphony No. 1 was awarded the Kennedy Center Friedheim Award in 1988, and his Trombone Concerto was awarded the 1993 Pulitzer Prize for Music. In 2002, Rouse was elected to the American Academy of Arts and Letters. Also in that year, he won a Grammy Award for Best Classical Contemporary Composition for his Concert de Gaudí composed for guitarist Sharon Isbin. In 2009, Rouse was named Musical America's Composer of the Year and the New York Philharmonic's Composer-in-Residence in 2012. Rouse also served as Composer-in-Residence with the Baltimore Symphony Orchestra (1985–88), the Tanglewood Music Festival (1997), the Helsinki Biennale (1997), the Pacific Music Festival (1998), and the Aspen Music Festival (annually since 2000).

His notable students included Kamran Ince, Marc Mellits, Michael Torke, Lawrence Wilde, Nico Muhly, Robert Paterson, Jeff Beal, Jude Vaclavik, Kevin Puts, D. J. Sparr, and Joseph Lukasik.

Rouse died on September 21, 2019, from complications of renal cancer in Towson, Maryland at the age of 70.

== Personal life ==
Rouse was married twice, first to Ann (née Jensen) in 1983 and then to Natasha (née Miller) in 2016. Rouse had four children: Angela, Jillian, Alexandra, and Adrian. Rouse was implicated in a sexual abuse exposee of Juilliard faculty.

== Music ==
Rouse was a neoromantic composer. Some of his works were predominantly atonal (Gorgon, Concerto for Orchestra) while others are clearly tonal (Karolju, Rapture, Supplica). Most often he sought to integrate tonal and non-tonal harmonic worlds, as in his concerti for flute, oboe, and guitar. All of his music was composed, in his words, "to convey a sense of expressive urgency." Rouse was praised for his orchestration, particularly with percussion. He often quoted other composers' works (e.g., his Symphony No. 1, composed in 1986, incorporates quotations of Bruckner and Shostakovich).

Rouse's oldest extant works are two brief pieces for percussion ensemble, both inspired by mythological subjects: Ogoun Badagris (1976, Haitian) and Ku-Ka-Ilimoku (1978, Polynesian); a later percussion score inspired by rock drumming, Bonham was composed in 1988.

The death of Leonard Bernstein in 1990 was the first in a series of deaths that made a profound impression on Rouse, and his Trombone Concerto (1991) became the first score of his so-called "Death Cycle," a group of pieces that all served as reactions to these deaths. These scores memorialized William Schuman (Violoncello Concerto—1992), the James Bulger murder (Flute Concerto—1993), the composer Stephen Albert (Symphony No. 2—1994), and Rouse's mother (Envoi—1995). After Envoi he purposely set out to compose scores that were more "light infused", works intended to take on a less dark cast; pieces from this second half of the 1990s include Compline (1996), Kabir Padavali (1997), the Concert de Gaudí (1999), Seeing (1998), and Rapture (2000).

Beginning in 2000, Rouse created works of varying moods, from his thorny Clarinet Concerto (2001) to his rock-infused The Nevill Feast (2003) to his romantic Oboe Concerto (2004). The most significant piece from these years was his ninety-minute Requiem, composed over 2001 and 2002. Rouse himself referred to the Requiem as his best composition. Major compositions of more recent vintage included his Concerto for Orchestra (2008), Odna Zhizn (2009), Symphony No. 3 (2011), Symphony No. 4 (2013), Thunderstuck (2013), Heimdall's Trumpet (a trumpet concerto—2012), Organ Concerto (2014), Symphony No. 5 (2015), Bassoon Concerto (2017), and Berceuse Infinie (2017).

In late 2006, Rouse composed the wind ensemble piece Wolf Rounds, which premiered in Carnegie Hall March 29, 2007.

== Legacy ==
Excerpts from Symphonies 1, 2 and 4, and Concerto per corde were used as the soundtrack to William Friedkin's 2017 film The Devil and Father Amorth.

== Complete works ==
=== Orchestra ===
- Gorgon (1984)
  - commissioned by the Rochester Philharmonic Orchestra, who premièred the work under David Zinman (to whom the work is dedicated) on November 15, 1984.
- Phantasmata (1981/85)
  - commissioned by the Saint Louis Symphony with the assistance of a grant from the National Endowment for the Arts; premièred by the Saint Louis Symphony under Leonard Slatkin at Powell Symphony Hall, St. Louis, Missouri, on October 25, 1986.
- Phaethon (1986)
  - commissioned by the Philadelphia Orchestra, who premièred the work under Riccardo Muti at the Philadelphia Academy of Music, Pennsylvania on 98 January 1987.
- Symphony No. 1 (1986, awarded the Kennedy Center Friedheim Award in 1988)
  - commissioned by the Baltimore Symphony (for whom Rouse served as composer-in-residence 1986–88), who gave the work's première under David Zinman at Meyerhoff Symphony Hall, Baltimore, Maryland on January 21, 1988.
- Iscariot (chamber orchestra, 1989)
  - co-commissioned by the Saint Paul Chamber Orchestra, the Los Angeles Chamber Orchestra and the New Jersey Symphony. Premièred by the Saint Paul Chamber Orchestra under John Adams at the Ordway Theater, Saint Paul, Minnesota on October 27, 1989.
- Concerto per Corde (string orchestra, 1990)
  - commissioned by Absolut Vodka; premièred by the American Symphony Orchestra under Catherine Comet at Avery Fisher Hall, New York City on November 28, 1990.
- Symphony No. 2 (1994)
  - commissioned by the Houston Symphony, who premièred the work under Christoph Eschenbach (to whom the work is dedicated) at Jones Hall, Houston, Texas on March 4, 1995.
- Envoi (1995)
  - dedicated to the memory of Rouse's mother. Commissioned by the Atlanta Symphony, who premièred the work under Yoel Levi at Atlanta Symphony Hall on May 9, 1996.
- Rapture (2000)
  - commissioned by the Pittsburgh Symphony, who premièred the work under Mariss Jansons (to whom the work is dedicated) at Heinz Hall, Pittsburgh, Pennsylvania on May 5, 2000.
- The Nevill Feast (2003)
  - commissioned by the Boston Pops Orchestra, who premièred the work under Keith Lockhart on May 7, 2003.
- Friandises (ballet, 2005)
  - jointly commissioned by New York City Ballet and the Juilliard School. Premièred by the New York City Ballet at the New York State Theater in Lincoln Center, NY on February 10, 2006.
- Concerto for Orchestra (2007–08)
  - commissioned by the Cabrillo Music Festival; premièred by the Cabrillo Festival Orchestra under Marin Alsop (to whom the work is dedicated) at the Santa Cruz Civic Auditorium in Santa Cruz, California on August 1, 2008.
- Odna Zhizn (2009)
  - commissioned by the New York Philharmonic, who premièred the work under Alan Gilbert at Avery Fisher Hall, New York City on February 10, 2010.
- Symphony No. 3 (2010–11)
  - commissioned by the Stockholm Philharmonic, the Singapore Symphony, the Baltimore Symphony, and the Saint Louis Symphony, who gave the work's world première under David Robertson at Powell Symphony Hall, St. Louis, Missouri, on May 5, 2011.
- Prospero's Rooms (2012)
  - commissioned by the New York Philharmonic; premiered on April 17, 2013, by the New York Philharmonic under Alan Gilbert in Avery Fisher Hall, New York
- Symphony No. 4 (2013)
  - commissioned by the New York Philharmonic; premiered by the New York Philharmonic under Alan Gilbert on June 5, 2014, in Avery Fisher Hall, New York
- Supplica (2013)
  - commissioned by the Pittsburgh and Pacific Symphony Orchestras; premièred April 4, 2014, by the Pittsburgh Symphony under Juraj Valcuha in Heinz Hall, Pittsburgh, Pennsylvania
- Thunderstuck (2013)
  - commissioned by the New York Philharmonic; premièred by the New York Philharmonic under Alan Gilbert on October 9, 2014, in Avery Fisher Hall, New York
- Symphony No. 5 (2015)
  - commissioned by the Dallas Symphony Orchestra, the Nashville Symphony, and the Aspen Music Festival; premièred by the Dallas Symphony Orchestra under Jaap van Zweden on February 9, 2017.
- Berceuse Infinie (2016)
  - commissioned by the Baltimore Symphony Orchestra; premièred by it under Marin Alsop on November 30, 2017.
- Symphony No. 6 (2019)
  - commissioned by the Cincinnati Symphony Orchestra; premièred posthumously by it under Louis Langrée at Music Hall, Cincinnati, on October 18, 2019.

=== Orchestra with soloist ===
- Violin Concerto (1991)
  - commissioned by the Aspen Music Festival for violinist Cho-Liang Lin (to whom the work is dedicated), who premièred the work with the Aspen Festival Orchestra under Leonard Slatkin in Aspen, Colorado on July 12, 1992.
- Trombone Concerto (1991, awarded the Pulitzer Prize for Music in 1993)
  - commissioned by the New York Philharmonic for its principal trombonist, Joseph Alessi; the work was premièred by those forces under Leonard Slatkin at Avery Fisher Hall, New York City, on December 30, 1992.
- Violoncello Concerto (1992–93)
  - commissioned by Betty Freeman; premièred by Yo-Yo Ma with the Los Angeles Philharmonic under David Zinman at the Dorothy Chandler Pavilion, Los Angeles, CA on January 26, 1994.
- Flute Concerto (1993)
  - premièred by Carol Wincenc and the Detroit Symphony under Hans Vonk at Detroit Orchestra Hall, Michigan on October 27, 1994.
- Der gerettete Alberich (Percussion Concerto, 1997)
  - co-commissioned by the London Symphony Orchestra, the Cleveland Orchestra, the Philadelphia Orchestra, and the Baltimore Symphony; premièred by Evelyn Glennie (to whom the work is dedicated) with the Cleveland Orchestra under Christoph von Dohnanyi
- Seeing (Piano Concerto, 1998)
  - commissioned by Lillian Barbash for Emanuel Ax and the New York Philharmonic, who gave the work's première under Leonard Slatkin at Avery Fisher Hall, New York City on May 6, 1999.
- Concert de Gaudí (Guitar Concerto, 1999; guitarist Sharon Isbin's recording with the Gulbenkian Orchestra won a GRAMMY Award in 2002 for Best Classical Contemporary Composition, and a 2002 Echo Klassik Award for Best Concert Recording.)
  - co-commissioned by the Norddeutscher Rundfunk Orchester and the Dallas Symphony; written for guitarist Sharon Isbin, who gave the work's première with the Norddeutscher Rundfunk Orchester under Christoph Eschenbach in Hamburg on January 2, 2000, and the US premiere with the Dallas Symphony on March 2, 2000.
- Clarinet Concerto (2000)
  - commissioned by the Chicago Symphony with funding provided by the American Institute for Music; premièred by Larry Combs with the Chicago Symphony under Christoph Eschenbach at Symphony Center, Chicago, Illinois on May 17, 2001. The work is dedicated to fellow composer Augusta Read Thomas.
- Oboe Concerto (2004)
  - commissioned by the Minnesota Orchestra in 2004; premièred by Basil Reeve with the Minnesota Orchestra under Osmo Vänskä at Orchestra Hall, Minneapolis, Minnesota on February 5, 2009.
- Heimdall's Trumpet (Trumpet Concerto, 2012)
  - commissioned by the Chicago Symphony; world première given by Christopher Martin and the Chicago Symphony under Jaap van Zweden at Symphony Center, Chicago on December 20, 2012.
- Organ Concerto (2014)
  - commissioned by the Philadelphia Orchestra, the Los Angeles Philharmonic, and the National Symphony Orchestra; world première given by Paul Jacobs and the Philadelphia Orchestra under Yannick Nézet-Séguin on November 17, 2016.
- Bassoon Concerto (2017)
  - commissioned by the New Jersey Symphony Orchestra, the St. Louis Symphony, the Sydney Symphony Orchestra, and the Lausanne Chamber Orchestra; première given by Andrew Cuneo and St. Louis Symphony under Cristian Măcelaru on November 16, 2018.

=== Voice and orchestra ===
- Karolju (1990), for S.A.T.B. chorus & orchestra
  - commissioned by the Baltimore Symphony with support from the Barlow Endowment and the Guggenheim Foundation; premièred by the Baltimore Symphony Orchestra & Chorus conducted by David Zinman on November 7, 1991. The work is dedicated to the composer's daughter, Alexandra.
- Kabir Padavali ("Kabir Songbook", 1997–98), for soprano solo & orchestra
  - 28-minute work, written for soprano Dawn Upshaw and commissioned by the Minnesota Orchestra, who premièred the work with Upshaw under David Zinman in Minneapolis on January 6, 1999. The piece is dedicated to the composer's son, Adrian.
- Requiem (2001–02), for baritone solo, children's choir, S.A.T.B. chorus & large orchestra
  - 90-minute work, commissioned by Soli Deo Gloria; premièred by the Los Angeles Master Chorale & Orchestra with the Los Angeles Children's Chorus and baritone soloist Sanford Sylvan under Grant Gershon at the Walt Disney Concert Hall, Los Angeles, California on March 25, 2007.

=== Wind ensemble ===
- Wolf Rounds (2007)
  - commissioned by the Frost Wind Ensemble of the University of Miami, who gave the work's première conducted by Gary Green (to whom the work is dedicated) at Carnegie Hall, New York City on March 29, 2007.
- Thor (1981); withdrawn

=== Chamber music ===
- Ogoun Badagris (percussion ensemble, 1976)
- Quattro Madrigali (eight-voice choir, 1976)
- Ku-Ka-Ilimoku (percussion ensemble, 1978)
- Rotae Passionis (mixed ensemble, 1982)
- String Quartet No. 1 (1982)
- Lares Hercii (violin and harpsichord, 1983)
- Surma Ritornelli (mixed ensemble, 1983)
- Artemis (brass quintet, 1988)
- Bonham (percussion ensemble, 1988)
- String Quartet No. 2 (1988)
- Compline (flute, clarinet, harp and string quartet, 1996)
- Rapturedux (cello ensemble, 2001)
- String Quartet No. 3 (2009)

=== Solo works ===
- Little Gorgon (piano, 1986)
- Ricordanza (cello, 1995)
- Valentine (flute, 1996)
- Mime (snare drum, 1997)
