= Wolf Rounds =

Wind ensemble composition by Christopher Rouse

Wolf Rounds is a musical composition for wind ensemble by the American composer Christopher Rouse. It was commissioned by the University of Miami-Frost Wind Ensemble and its conductor, Gary Green, who premiered the work at Carnegie Hall, New York, on March 29, 2007. Wolf Rounds was completed in Baltimore, Maryland on October 16, 2006, and lasts approximately seventeen minutes in performance. It is scored for piccolo, two flutes, three oboes, two clarinets, bass clarinet, two bassoons, contrabassoon, baritone saxophone, bass saxophone, four horns, three trumpets, three trombones, tuba, timpani, percussion (five players), and string bass (amplified).

Wolf Rounds marks the first piece Rouse composed for wind ensemble. Green had previously approached Rouse about a piece for the Wind Ensemble. Rouse initially refused, saying, "I thought I would miss my strings," but later changed his mind. The piece uses a circular motive found throughout, and its original title was Loops. Rouse dismissed the title as bland and prosaic, but the Latin word "lupus" (wolf) came to mind, reminding him of how a wolf, when hunting, circles its prey. These predatory rounds resemble the circular motive that the piece weaves throughout the ensemble.

Rouse wrote in the program notes to the piece:

My concept of the work was to introduce a series of 'circular' musical ideas that would repeat over and over until metamorphosing to a new idea that would then also be repeated in the same fashion until becoming yet another. These musics would be of different lengths so that their repeated overlaps would produce a constantly changing sonic landscape. Sometimes these ideas would repeat verbatim; at other times there would be gradual but constant development within each repetition. Some instruments would introduce new musics while others would continue to repeat their material for a longer period of time before moving on to a new idea.
