= Requiem (Rouse) =

Work for choir and orchestra by Christopher Rouse

Requiem is a composition for solo baritone, children's choir, chorus, and orchestra by the American composer Christopher Rouse. The piece was commissioned by Soli Deo Gloria for the 2003 bicentennial of the birth of French composer Hector Berlioz. It was completed July 12, 2002 and premiered March 25, 2007 at the Walt Disney Concert Hall in Los Angeles, with the conductor Grant Gershon leading the Los Angeles Master Chorale and their orchestra, the Los Angeles Children's Chorus, and the baritone Sanford Sylvan.

== Composition ==
The duration of the Requiem is approximately 90 minutes. Though it was commissioned to commemorate composer Hector Berlioz, the piece contains no references to the music of Berlioz. Rouse was more inspired by the War Requiem by English composer Benjamin Britten. Similar to the War Requiem, the composition follows the liturgical requiem text, but additionally incorporates text from other sources, specifically lyrics from European hymns and lines from the poetry of Seamus Heaney, Siegfried Sassoon, Michelangelo, Ben Jonson, and John Milton.

=== 9/11 ===
Having completed the work shortly after the events of the 2001 September 11 attacks, Rouse, after much personal deliberation, elected not to dedicate the Requiem to the victims of the attacks. In the program notes, Rouse commented:

September 11, 2001 found me in New York City. After the initial shock of the day's events began to wear off, it became obvious to me that this Requiem of which I had completed about half should be completed in and dedicated to the remembrance of those who perished. However, further reflection led me to change my mind; I had come to feel that some tragedies were too enormous to consecrate with anything more than deep but silent grieving and that to turn this piece into a '9/11 work' might even smack a bit of opportunism. There is a small, symbolic reference in the score to September 11, but beyond that I have elected to attempt, in my own inadequate way, a remembrance of all who have died as well as those who have survived and grieved for them. It is my hope that my Requiem will, in the end, provide some sort of solace, and for this reason I have interspersed near the conclusion verses from the Anglican hymn 'Now the Laborer's Task is O'er' (death) with lines from 'Es ist ein' Ros' entsprungen' (i.e., 'Lo! How a Rose e'er Blooming' - birth).

== Reception ==
Mark Swed of the Los Angeles Times lavished the Requiem with praise, declaring it "the first great traditional American Requiem" and called it "a Requiem of wondrous mixed emotions." George Grella of the New York Classical Review called the piece "fascinating, massive, ungainly, often moving, sometimes unhinged: if not a completely successful composition, at least an impressive showcase for musicians and composer’s craft alike." Corinna Da Fonseca-Wollheim of The New York Times praised the New York City premiere, saying, "The predominant mood of Mr. Rouse’s 'Requiem' is one of uncomprehending grief and fury almost as if, bereft of faith, it were mourning the death of consolation itself. But then there are glimpses of hope. Mr. Imbrailo’s limpid and smoothly flowing rendition of Jonson’s 'Farewell, thou child of my right hand' was joined by a fleeting, radiant flute solo. And when the Brooklyn Youth Chorus entered with the Marian hymn 'Es ist ein Ros entsprungen,' sung with a gleaming, pure sound from a side balcony, the effect was powerfully emotional, even as it skirted the fine line between pathos and kitsch."

At the New York City premiere, conductor Alan Gilbert said of the Requiem, "This work goes farther or comes from deeper in him than almost any other piece of his. It takes a lot out of you both technically but emotionally as well." Rouse himself said of the piece, "All of that was to try to put across the idea of facing death, whether you're facing it yourself or if you're going on after the death of a loved one. But it is a very personal work and I think it's the best work I've composed."
