= Symphony No. 1 (Rouse) =

Symphony by Christopher Rouse

Symphony No. 1 is a symphony in one movement by the American composer Christopher Rouse. The work was commissioned by David Zinman and the Baltimore Symphony Orchestra, completed on August 26, 1986, and premiered in Baltimore, January 21, 1988. The piece is dedicated to Rouse's friend and fellow composer, John Harbison.

== Composition ==
The symphony is composed in a single adagio movement and has a duration of approximately 27 minutes. The work was conceived, in part, as a companion to Rouse's 1984 orchestral piece Gorgon.

=== Style and influences ===
The music quotes Anton Bruckner's Symphony No. 7. In the program notes to the score, Rouse commented on his inspirations and the use of Bruckner, saying, "In my Symphony No. 1 I have attempted to pay conscious homage to many of those I especially admire as composers of adagios -- Shostakovich, Sibelius, Hartmann, Pettersson, and Schuman, for example -- recognizably quoted are the famous opening theme from the second movement of Bruckner's Symphony No. 7, played both in the original and here by a quartet of Wagner Tubas) and the climax of Allan Pettersson's 7th Symphony, where the high violins come down from another harmonic tune than the rest of the orchestra to melt down and merge with it (19m of 27)."

=== Instrumentation ===
The piece is scored for two flutes (2nd doubling on piccolo), two oboes (2nd doubling on oboe d'amore and English horn), two clarinets (2nd doubling on bass clarinet), two bassoons (2nd doubling on contrabassoon), four French horns (all doubling Wagner Tubas), three trumpets, three trombones, tuba, timpani, percussion (three players), and strings (violins I & II, violas, violoncellos, and double basses).

== Reception ==
Music critic David Hurwitz described the work as "wholly gripping and vividly contrasted despite the slow pacing and prevailing gloomy atmosphere." Reviewing the 1992 Los Angeles premiere of the symphony, Daniel Cariaga of the Los Angeles Times wrote, "In the 27 intense minutes of this L.A. premiere performance, the Symphony sometimes loudly achieved a finally quiet victory over pessimism, all the while engaging the observer in its progress to that not-predictable end. [Rouse] calls this piece tonal, and it may be, if one counts the number of bars in which consonance, rather than grating dissonance, holds sway. But what one remembers is the bite of atonality on the way to sound-resolutions in this gripping, abstract musical scenario."

Conversely, Calum MacDonald of BBC Music Magazine was less favorable, describing the work as "inhabiting a blackness somewhere beyond Shostakovich and Pettersson" and adding, "the single-movement First Symphony (1986) takes a familiar theme from Bruckner’s Seventh and subjects its aspiration to all manner of ironic and negative underminings and reversals, ending in exhausted elegy."

The symphony won the first place 1988 Kennedy Center Friedheim Award.
