= Gary Green (conductor) =

American conductor

Gary Green is an American conductor specializing in the wind band.

He has commissioned works for the wind band by composers including Eric Whitacre, Michael Colgrass, Kenneth Fuchs, David Maslanka, Mark Camphouse, and Christopher Rouse.

== Education ==
Green holds a B.M. degree from Boise State University and an M.M. degree from the University of Idaho.

== Career ==
Green serves as the director of bands at University High School in Spokane, Washington, before conducting the Symphony Band, Wind Ensemble, and Marching Band at the University of Connecticut. In 1993, Green joined the University of Miami's Frost School of Music as director of bands and conductor of the Wind Ensemble, positions he held until his retirement in 2015. During this tenure, he was a professor and chair in the Department of Instrumental Performance and taught wind band conducting and literature. Under his direction, the Frost Wind Ensemble recorded for the Albany label

In February 2006, Green conducted the East Coast Premiere of David Maslanka's Mass after the composer's 2005 revision, which was performed by the University of Miami School of Music's Frost Wind Ensemble, Choral Union, and Miami Children's Chorus, featuring soloists Janice Chandler-Eteme, soprano and Jeffrey Morrissey, baritone. On 29 March 2007, Green premiered Rouse's Wolf Rounds at Carnegie Hall in New York with the University of Miami-Frost Wind Ensemble.

Throughout his career, Green has received numerous honors and awards. His conducting activities include events in Florida, Texas, Connecticut, Kansas, Maryland, Georgia, Utah, Virginia, and Washington. In addition, he has conducted all state, regional, national, and international honor bands, including in Taipei, Taiwan.
