= String Quartet No. 2 (Rouse) =

String quartet by Christopher Rouse

The String Quartet No. 2 is the second string quartet by the American composer Christopher Rouse. The work was commissioned by the Cleveland Quartet with additional contributions from the Eastman School of Music and was completed May 6, 1988. It was given its world premiere at the Aspen Music Festival by the Cleveland Quartet in July 1988. Rouse dedicated the composition to the people of the Soviet Union.

== Composition ==
The work has a duration of roughly 17 minutes and is composed in three connected movements:

1. Adagio
2. Agitato
3. Largo

Rouse described the inspiration for the String Quartet No. 2 in the score program notes, writing:

When I travelled with the Baltimore Symphony Orchestra to Moscow and Leningrad in May 1987 for performances of my music, I was struck by the warmth and generosity of spirit of the concertgoers we encountered, and I resolved that I would try in some small way to express my appreciation to and my admiration for them at a future time. It was agreed that, as my Second Quartet was to be performed widely in the Soviet Union by the Cleveland Quartet during autumn of 1988, this would be an appropriate opportunity for me to compose a work which would realize this desire.

The music is based upon the signature DSCH motif (D, E-flat, C, B) used by the Russian composer Dmitri Shostakovich, which appears in its original form and a number of variations. Rouse compared the "tragic" tone of the work to that of his Symphony No. 1, but nevertheless stipulated that the string quartet "is not programmatic in any specific sense and does not seek to convey any particular 'message.'" He added, "This is the result of a personal desire to communicate ultimately with listeners of all nationalities and should not be interpreted as a socioplitical commentary in any way." Rouse later reworked the composition into his Concerto per Corde for string orchestra in 1990.

== Reception ==
Reviewing the January 1989 New York City premiere, Charles McCardell of The Washington Post praised the string quartet, saying it "has a sort of Cold War grimness that spreads from a simple two-note motto initiated by the cello, then erupts in a full-blown ensemble clash, before finding a soothing B major resolution. Rouse's piece is impressive, and with any justice will be heard again soon and often."
