= Oboe Concerto (Rouse) =

Oboe concerto by Christopher Rouse

The Oboe Concerto is a concerto for oboe and orchestra by the American composer Christopher Rouse. The work was commissioned by the Minnesota Orchestra and completed in 2004. The piece premiered in 2009 with oboist Basil Reeve and the Minnesota Orchestra performing under conductor Osmo Vanska.

== Composition ==
The Oboe Concerto is composed in three connected movements, following the traditional fast-slow-fast form. A five-note chord introduced by the strings at the beginning of the piece lays the groundwork for much of the harmonic material of the concerto.

=== Inspiration ===
Rouse designed the piece as a non-programmatic work, commenting in the score notes:

Unlike some of my other concerti, there is no overt program to this piece. It aims of course to explore the capabilities of the oboe, of which the first in everyone's mind is its capacity to play long, lyrical lines. However, to compose a score that would only concern itself with this aspect of the oboe would be to deny the instrument's more virtuosic attributes, and so there are plenty of moments when the soloist is asked to play music requiring substantial agility. Notwithstanding the fast — sometimes extremely fast! — music that abounds in the work, I feel that there is an overall feeling of coloristic romanticism in the concerto, especially in the central slow movement.

Despite this, principal oboist Liang Wang of the New York Philharmonic, who performed the concerto's New York City premiere, said, "I think this is certainly a love story. And it captures some of the best qualities of the oboe, which is if you just take one note it can give you many different colors."

=== Instrumentation ===
The concerto is scored for solo oboe and an orchestra comprising two flutes, piccolo (doubling alto flute), two clarinets, two bassoons, two French horns, two trumpets, three trombones, percussion (three players), harp, celesta, and strings (violins I & II, violas, violoncellos, and double basses).

== Reception ==
Reviewing the 2013 New York City premiere of the piece, Steve Smith of The New York Times commented, "...few living composers rival Mr. Rouse’s knack for the grotesque, the elemental and the bombastic. And the oboe, for all its politesse, is capable of producing positively hideous multiphonics and other unorthodox effects. [...] But in Mr. Rouse’s concerto, the principal test for the soloist is to produce seemingly endless lines that float weightless over aural backgrounds that shimmer and sigh in summer-afternoon languor." David Patrick Stearns of The Philadelphia Inquirer praised the concerto as "distinguished" and said, "Sonorities seemed like characters: Muted brass seemed simultaneously comic and ominous. Hushed string chords didn't point in any further direction but bristled with an energy that suggests the piece could explode at any time. Harp and celesta added dreamy touches that could turn nightmarish." Stearns continued, "The younger Rouse wrote music that went to many extremes. Here, extremes are more implied possibilities, and are just as powerful. Though the oboe writing was full of animation, the best moments felt more like an invocation (in the incantatory sense of the word)."

Fellow composer James Primosch of the University of Pennsylvania also praised the work, saying, "I was most taken with the slow music – exquisite colors, both in the sense of harmony and of orchestral timbre. The contrasting fast playful sections are brilliant, but it was the ecstatic stillness supporting the intensely lyrical Woodhams oboe that was most striking."
