= Organ Concerto (Rouse) =

Concerto by Christopher Rouse

The Organ Concerto is a composition for solo organ and orchestra by the American composer Christopher Rouse. The work was commissioned for the organist Paul Jacobs by the Philadelphia Orchestra, the Los Angeles Philharmonic, and the National Symphony Orchestra. It was completed on June 23, 2014, and was first performed by Paul Jacobs and the Philadelphia Orchestra under the direction of Yannick Nézet-Séguin at the Kimmel Center for the Performing Arts on November 17, 2016. Rouse dedicated the piece to Jacobs.

== Composition ==
The concerto has a duration of roughly 20 minutes and is cast in the traditional three-movement concerto form. In the score program notes, Rouse wrote, "Often in my symphonies and concerti I have chosen a form other than the 'standard' one (i.e., four movements for symphonies, three for concerti). This is not due to any sense of dissatisfaction for those standard forms but rather reflects my desire to try new things." He continued:

However, sometimes those standard forms seem to be just the right ones, and that is the case with my Organ Concerto: a fast first movement, a slow second movement, and a fast finale. There is no programmatic content in this work, though of course I am always trying to express emotional states. In this concerto, as in so many of my scores, the language ranges from a consonant one to a more dissonant one, though I hope that the dissonance level is never so high that it prevents me from pivoting convincingly into a more tonal harmonic world.

=== Instrumentation ===
The work is scored for solo organ and a small orchestra comprising bass clarinet, contrabassoon, four horns, two trumpets, three trombones, tuba, timpani, three percussionists, and strings.

== Reception ==
The Organ Concerto has been praised by music critics. Barbara Jepson of The Wall Street Journal described the piece as "generically titled but audacious" and called it "a substantial work that requires all those involved to be quick-change artists." He added, "Cast in three sections played without interruption, its musical language teeters between tonality and dense, chromatic dissonance. Although the violins, trumpet and organ supply occasional high notes, most of the work’s orchestral colors are in the burnished lower registers—cellos and double basses, trombones, tuba, bassoon and some skillful writing for the earthy contrabassoon, played with notable musicality by Holly Blake." George Loomis of the Financial Times noted "the vitality and visceral excitement" of Rouse's music and observed:

Rouse also showed due concern for investing the concerto, cast in the traditional three-movement form, with musical substance. It has a serious side, reflected in a hefty supply of dissonance within Rouse's typically expansive harmonic palette, as well as pregnant, chromatically inflected themes in the slow movement. I favoured the bracing third movement in compound metre, which started with a jagged fugue-like subject in quick notes and, abetted by Jacobs's wizardry, gathered fury to become a fiendish, manic gigue.
