= Odna Zhizn =

Symphonic poem by Christopher Rouse

Odna Zhizn is a symphonic poem by the American composer Christopher Rouse. The work was commissioned by the New York Philharmonic and was completed in 2009. It was first performed on February 10, 2010, at Avery Fisher Hall in New York City, by the New York Philharmonic under the direction of Alan Gilbert.

== Composition ==
=== Background ===
Rouse composed Odna Zhizn as a tribute to an unnamed friend, using a musical code to spell names and phrases in what Rouse called "a private love letter." In the program notes to the score, Rouse wrote:

In Russian, "odna zhizn" means "a life." This fifteen-minute work has been composed in homage to a person of Russian ancestry who is very dear to me. Her life has not been an easy one, and the struggles she has faced are reflected in the sometimes peripatetic nature of the music. While quite a few of my scores have symbolically translated various words into notes and rhythms, this process has been carried to an extreme degree in "Zhizn": virtually all of the music is focused on the spelling of names and other phrases, and it was an enormous challenge for me to fashion these materials into what I hoped would be a satisfying musical experience that functions both as the public portrayal of an extraordinary life as well as a private love letter.

In a September 2016 interview on All Things Considered, Rouse revealed that piece was written for his wife Natasha, whom he married earlier that year. Describing the more unpleasant aspects of the piece, he remarked, "[Natasha] was sexually abused as a child, so she ran away from home at 16 and decided to hitchhike out west. One of the people who picked her up held her for three days and raped her repeatedly. She ended up in Arizona in Tucson and she was homeless, so she was living under a bridge and eating out of dumpsters. And all of that before the age of 18." He added, "I certainly couldn't have survived that, I don't think, and I'm not sure most people could either. But that's why the fact that she is this warmhearted, wonderful person is all the more amazing."

=== Instrumentation ===
The work is scored for three flutes (3rd doubling piccolo), two oboes, English horn, two clarinets, bass clarinet, two bassoons, contrabassoon, four French horns, three trumpets, three trombones, tuba, timpani, three percussionists, harp, celesta, and strings.

== Reception ==
Reviewing the world premiere of Odna Zhizn, Allan Kozinn of The New York Times called the piece "a magical score" and said:

Against a backdrop of haunting, pianissimo strings, which move at a glacial pace, Mr. Rouse imposes short bursts of fast, angular flute figures, darkly mysterious contributions from lower-lying woodwinds, and sudden bursts of fortissimo brass. Eventually the strings abandon their Ivesian introspection (think of the opening of The Unanswered Question) and take up more vigorous themes of their own. But as in many new scores, the real action is in the huge percussion array, which not only contributes shimmering effects and underpins the brass bursts, but also provides the connective tissue between the string and wind writing.

Fellow composer Joel Puckett also praised the work, writing for The Baltimore Sun:

We were all stunned in hearing the piece. I was reminded of the line sometimes credited to Beethoven, 'Music must surprise and satisfy at every turn'. It turns out each of us were right and, at the same time, all of us were wrong. In Odna Zhizn, Chris manages to sound very much like himself while at the same time pushing his harmonies and textures in completely new directions by simplifying them. I don’t think any of us were expecting the incredibly straightforward and staggeringly beautiful opening of the piece. To my ears, this is Chris boldly allowing himself to speak simply and directly with devastating effect.
