= Symphony No. 6 (Rouse) =

Symphony by Christopher Rouse

The Symphony No. 6 is a symphony for orchestra by the American composer Christopher Rouse. The work was commissioned by the Cincinnati Symphony Orchestra and was completed in the composer's Baltimore home on June 6, 2019. It was first performed in Cincinnati Music Hall by the Cincinnati Symphony Orchestra conducted by Louis Langrée on October 18, 2019. Written as a personal epitaph, the symphony was Rouse's last completed work before his death in September 2019.

== Composition ==
=== Background ===
Rouse, who knew he was dying after an eight-year bout of renal cancer, composed the work as a personal epitaph. Referring to a set of compositions known as his "Death Cycle," he wrote from hospice in a pre-performance statement, "One final time my subject is death, though in this event it is my own of which I write." The symphony has a duration of roughly 26 minutes and, unlike Rouse's previous symphonies, is cast in the standard four-movement form. The structure mirrors that of Gustav Mahler's Ninth Symphony, with two slow movements book-ending two faster movements in the middle. Despite occasional rhythmic references, however, Rouse did not quote any of Mahler's music, as he wanted to end his symphony "in a mood markedly different from [Mahler's]." The composer continued:

My choice of "unusual instrument" this time around was the fluegelhorn. The timbre of this dark-tinged member of the trumpet family seemed right for the elegiac quality of the symphony's opening idea, and it is a color that will return at various stages during the piece. My intent was to imbue the opening movement with a feeling of yearning as it strives to find an anchor in a sea of doubt. Each of the middle movements serves as an interlude in its own way, neither working with nor against the expressive grain of the opening adagio. (For me, this is also how Mahler's two middle movements largely function within the span of his 9th; the essential connection in both symphonies is that between the opening and the closing movements.) Ultimately there is a valedictory passage featuring the strings over a long droning E in the contrabasses. The drone is the lifeline. Fear and doubt give way to an uncertain serenity. Still the life drone sounds. Love adds its grace and its healing power. The drone continues. Gradually all begins to recede but for the drone. The drone holds and holds. At the end, the final step must be taken alone. The drone continues...and continues.... Until it stops.

Under the final bar of the symphony, where the composer would usually sign his scores "Deo gratias", he instead signed "Finis."

=== Instrumentation ===
The work is scored for a large orchestra consisting of two flutes, two oboes, two clarinets (2nd doubling bass clarinet), two bassoons, four horns, two trumpets (1st doubling flugelhorn), three trombones, tuba, timpani, two percussionists, harp, and strings.

== Reception ==
Reviewing the world premiere, Janelle Gelfand of the Cincinnati Business Courier highly praised the symphony, remarking, "Like Mahler, who was partly a model for this work, Rouse's Sixth Symphony has elements of tragedy, with heaven-rending climaxes of shattering impact. But there was also evidence of the composer’s love of life in moments of sincere beauty and lightheartedness. Written with exquisite care, it was one of the finest new works premiered in Music Hall in memory and seems destined to become known as one of the symphonic masterpieces of our time." Lawrence A. Johnson of the Chicago Classical Review also lauded the piece, writing, "Speaking of this final work, the composer said 'My main hope is that it will communicate something sincere in meaning to those who hear it.' Christopher Rouse's Sixth Symphony does that with great feeling, sterling craft and economy and concentrated dramatic impact in a work that should quickly become a repertory standard. Rouse's Sixth is not only arguably the finest of all his works in the genre but among the handful of truly great symphonies written by an American composer."

Joshua Barone of The New York Times described the work as "a haunting and profound farewell, though not one of maudlin anguish or tearfulness. [...] Mr. Rouse's final symphony is often tonal, directly stated and taut, with an uncanny timelessness. Hearing it, you might know it's from the past 100 years, though you would have a hard time saying exactly when." He concluded, "At the premiere, Mr. Langrée kept his baton raised ambiguously — neither high enough to hold off audience applause, nor low enough to indicate that the piece had ended — as if unwilling to let go entirely, and wanting to offer a moment of silence to a composer who had just delivered his own eulogy."
