= Symphony No. 5 (Rouse) =

Symphony by Christopher Rouse

The Symphony No. 5 is a symphony for orchestra by the American composer Christopher Rouse. The work was jointly commissioned by the Dallas Symphony Orchestra, the Nashville Symphony, and the Aspen Music Festival. It was completed in Baltimore on February 15, 2015, and was first performed by the Dallas Symphony Orchestra under the direction of Jaap van Zweden at the Morton H. Meyerson Symphony Center on February 9, 2017.

== Composition ==
=== Background ===
The symphony has a duration of roughly 25 minutes and is written in one continuous movement, mimicking the traditional four-movement symphonic form. Rouse drew inspiration for the work from Ludwig van Beethoven's Fifth Symphony, about which he recalled in the score program notes:

The first piece of "classical music" I remembering hearing — "Peter and the Wolf" doesn't count — was Beethoven's Fifth Symphony. I was six years old and had been listening to a great deal of early, new-at-the-time rock and roll; my mother said, "That's fine, but you might like this as well." It was a recording of the Beethoven symphony, and I remember thinking that a whole new world was opening up to me. I decided that I wanted to become a composer.

The composition thus features a number of homages to the Beethoven symphony, including a paraphrase of the famous four-note motif that opens the first movement. Rouse added, "The most extended reference is to the connective passage that links the third and fourth movements of the Beethoven: the mysterious passage for timpani over a long chord in the strings. My timpani part is identical to Beethoven's; once again, though, what goes on around it is different." He concluded, "As is often the case in my music, the language ranges freely — but I hope in an integrated way — between a dissonant language and a more consonant one. There is no programmatic element to the work, though I do hope to transport the listener through a series of emotional states, from turbulence to serenity."

=== Instrumentation ===
The work is scored for a large orchestra consisting of three flutes (third doubling bass flute), three oboes, three clarinets, three bassoons, four horns, three trumpets, three trombones, tuba, timpani, percussion (three players), two harps, and strings.

== Reception ==
Reviewing the world premiere performance, Scott Cantrell of The Dallas Morning News wrote, "Rarely does a brand-new piece of music really grab me and keep me completely engaged on first hearing. But the world premiere of Christopher Rouse's brilliant, exciting and at times hauntingly beautiful Fifth Symphony had that effect Friday night, at the Meyerson Symphony Center. Judging by the roaring ovation after the Dallas Symphony Orchestra performance, under music director Jaap van Zweden, lots of others were similarly affected." Wayne Lee Gay of the Texas Classical Review also praised the work, remarking, "With this new addition to the list, [Rouse] can stake claim to the title of the leading American symphonist of our time." He added:

Rouse has no qualms about seducing the listener with harp chords and sweeping melodies, nor is he shy about jolting the audience with all the noise the modern symphony orchestra can muster. As in so many great Romantic and post-Romantic symphonies of the past, grand ideas are packaged in a logical form that gives the listeners, whether or not they are consciously aware of the structure, a sense of emotional pilgrimage—of moving into a spiritual and intellectual space not on any map. This listener, for one, will welcome the opportunity to hear, explore, and emotionally experience this work again.

== Recordings ==
- Christopher Rouse: Symphony No. 5 (Naxos) – 2020 OCLC 1176540097, Grammy Award for Best Contemporary Classical Composition 2020
  - Nashville Symphony; Giancarlo Guerrero, conductor.
