= String Quartet No. 3 (Rouse) =

String quartet by Christopher Rouse

The String Quartet No. 3 is the third string quartet by the American composer Christopher Rouse. The work was jointly commissioned by the Festival of Arts and Ideas, the Calder Quartet, Chamber Music America, Carnegie Hall, the Santa Fe Chamber Music Festival, and the LaJolla Music Society. It was first performed at Yale University on June 18, 2010, by the Calder Quartet, to whom the piece is dedicated. The composition has a duration of roughly 22 minutes and is composed in one continuous movement.

== Composition ==
=== Background ===
The Calder Quartet first approached Rouse about a new commission in 2006 after recording the composer's first and second string quartets. Rouse was unable to begin work on the piece for a couple of years, however, and completed the String Quartet No. 3 in 2009.

=== Style and inspiration ===
Rouse described the style and inspiration for the string quartet in the score program notes, writing:

I have often heard in my mind's ear what I call "another music," a music whose difficulty and complexity would render it impractical for orchestral use, considering the size of the orchestral apparatus and the limited rehearsal time available for preparing works for that medium. Having duly warned the Calders of what I intended, I set about to try putting down on paper what this "other music" might sound like.

He continued:

The central focus of what I was hearing was a succession of extremely convulsive and unpredictable gestures rendered by the players in rhythmic unison — that is, these complex rhythms would have to be performed totally together by the four players: no small feat. The work is thus made up primarily of these rhythmically monodic ideas, though they sometimes do spin out of control into a series of imitative gestures. Though perhaps unpalatable to some, my overall description of the piece would be something akin to a schizophrenic having a grand mal seizure. This, at least, was the image to which I continually referred as I composed the music.

Rouse concluded, "The music is staggeringly difficult to play, and I believe this to be my most challenging and uncompromising work to date."

== Reception ==
Steve Smith of The New York Times highly lauded the piece, remarking:

From a melancholy opening filled with swooping glissandos, the 20-minute string quartet emphasizes group virtuosity with jagged bursts of notes deployed in rhythmic unison, mostly at high velocity. Likened by Mr. Rouse in a program note to a grand mal seizure and uneasy even in repose, the piece is unsparing in its demands for pinpoint accuracy, sudden dynamic contrasts and clear articulation. The Calder players met all of its challenges easily in an exacting account.

Christian Hertzog of LA Weekly similarly declared the work to be "the most exciting, take-no-prisoners quartet since George Crumb's Black Angels (1971), and it should become just as popular."
