= Symphony No. 4 (Rouse) =

Orchestral composition by American composer Christopher Rouse

Symphony No. 4 is an orchestral composition in two movements by the American composer Christopher Rouse. The work was commissioned by the New York Philharmonic, for which Rouse was then composer-in-residence. The piece was completed June 30, 2013, and was premiered on June 5, 2014, in Avery Fisher Hall, New York City, by the New York Philharmonic under the direction of Alan Gilbert.

== Composition ==
=== Inspiration ===
Regarding the inspiration of the work and whether the symphony had a programmatic intent, Rouse has remained deliberately ambiguous. In the program notes to the score, he commented:

For those of my scores in which I have had a reasonably specific expressive intent, I have usually tried to be open about the nature of that intent. However, there have been a few occasions when I have felt the need to say very little in this regard. [...] ...while I did have a particular meaning in mind when composing my Symphony No. 4, I prefer to keep it to myself. Some listeners may find the piece baffling but will nonetheless have to guess.

=== Structure ===
The symphony has a duration of roughly twenty minutes and is composed in two movements:

1. Felice
2. Doloroso

=== Instrumentation ===
The symphony is scored for piccolo, two flutes, two oboes, English horn, two clarinets, contrabass clarinet, two bassoons, contrabassoon, four French horns, three trumpets, four trombones, tuba, timpani, percussion (three players), harp, celesta, and strings (violins I & II, violas, violoncellos, and double basses).

== Reception ==
Alex Ross of The New Yorker praised the symphony, calling it "a short and engagingly strange piece that plunged without warning from dance to dolor." WQXR-FM called it "a grand gesture in symphonic writing." Anthony Tommasini of The New York Times described the piece as "an intriguing 20-minute work structured in two connected movements of vastly contrasting character: the first bustling and seemingly cheerful, the second grim and despairing." Tommasini further commented:

The first movement of Mr. Rouse’s Symphony No. 4 is marked 'Felice,' and the music is indeed felicitous. There are bustling rhythmic figurations and whole passages built from ascending, sputtering scale motifs. After a while the cheerful energy becomes tiresome. Enough, already! What is he up to? The music becomes bogged down with intricacy, jagged phrases and weighty harmonies. The first movement seems to decompress, or deflate. The second movement, marked 'Doloroso,' becomes ominous, which could have sounded melodramatic and obvious. But Mr. Rouse explores the dark side with restraint and mystery. The piece does not end so much as give up, in a final, enigmatic gesture.
