= Envoy =

Envoy or Envoys may refer to:

== Diplomacy ==
- Diplomacy, in general
- Envoy (title)
- Special envoy, a type of diplomatic rank

== Brands ==
- Airspeed Envoy, a 1930s British light transport aircraft
- Envoy (automobile), an automobile brand used to sell British built Vauxhall and Bedford vehicles in the Canadian market
- Envoy (WordPerfect), a document reader and document file format
- Envoy Air, a United States regional airline
- GMC Envoy, a make of automobile
- Motorola Envoy, a personal digital assistant released by Motorola in summer 1994
- Envoy, web-service–proxy software that is part of Cloud Native Computing Foundation
- Envoy, the call sign for United Kingdom airline Flyjet

== Culture ==
- Envoy, A Review of Literature and Art, an Irish magazine
- The Envoy (Gavilán Rayna Russom album), 2019
- The Envoy (Polonskaya novel), a 1989 Russian novel by Elizaveta Polonskaya
- The Envoy (Warren Zevon album), 1982
- The Envoy, a 2008 spy novel by Edward Wilson
- Der Gesandte (The Envoy), a 1991 play by the Swiss playwright Thomas Hürlimann
- "Envoys" (Star Trek: Lower Decks), 2020 television episode
- L'envoi a chapter in Hemingway's short story collection In Our Time of 1925

== See also ==
- Envoi, a short stanza at the end of a poem
