= Violin Concerto (Rouse) =

Concerto by Christopher Rouse

The Violin Concerto is a concerto for violin and orchestra in two movements by the American composer Christopher Rouse. The work was commissioned for violinist Cho-Liang Lin by the Aspen Music Festival and School and funded in part by a grant from the National Endowment for the Arts. It was completed August 18, 1991 and is dedicated to Cho-Liang Lin.

== Composition ==
A performance of the Violin Concerto lasts approximately 25 minutes. The work is composed in two movements:

1. Barcarolle
2. Toccata

The two-movement structure of the work alludes to the form of Béla Bartók's Violin Concerto No. 1.

=== Instrumentation ===
The work is scored for solo violin and an orchestra consisting of two flutes (2nd doubling piccolo), two oboes (2nd doubling cor anglais), two clarinets (2nd doubling bass clarinet), two bassoons (2nd doubling contrabassoon), four horns, two trumpets, three trombones, tuba, timpani, three percussionists, celesta, harp, and strings.

== Reception ==
Stephen Wigler of The Baltimore Sun praised the piece, saying, "It is a beautiful work, accessible yet challenging, and one that is very difficult to play." Wigler continued, "Rouse's treatment of the solo instrument puts it — as it is not in many other contemporary concertos — at the center of things. The work, which runs about 25 minutes, is organized around the violin in ingenious ways. It opens with an extended, yearning violin cadenza; the first movement 'Barcarolle' ends with yet another cadenza in much the same mood — this time accompanied by a persistent heartbeat by the timpani and lower strings with some exquisite interjections by the harp and celesta; and the piece ends with yet another cadenza — this time in perpetual motion and packed with furious 16th notes and flying double stops." David Gutman of Gramophone similarly lauded the work, writing, "Rouse makes his customary allusions, working within a two-part structure that is both satisfying and unusual. The Barcarola's opening tissue of music for string quartet (the soloist plus three orchestral players) is memorably savaged by a tutti chord that subsides into C minor. Its equally haunting conclusion leads immediately to the concluding Toccata, which has the requisite raciness and dazzle of the romantic concerto finale while remaining no more than quasi-tonal." Music critic Tony Haywood also commended the concerto, noting the architecture and a strong interplay between the soloist and orchestra.
