= Phantasmata =

Orchestral triptych composed by Christopher Rouse

Phantasmata is an orchestral triptych by the American composer Christopher Rouse. The title is derived from the works of the occultist Paracelsus, who described phantasmata as "hallucinations created by thought ". Rouse originally composed the second movement "The Infernal Machine" as a stand-alone piece in 1981, though he later elected to make it the second part of a larger work. Phantasmata was commissioned in full by the St. Louis Symphony and a fellowship grant from the National Endowment for the Arts and completed March 22, 1985.

== Composition ==
=== "The Evestrum of Juan de la Cruz in the Sagrada Familia, 3 A.M." ===
The first movement, "The Evestrum of Juan de la Cruz in the Sagrada Familia, 3 A.M.," is scored for only strings and percussion. The piece is dedicated to composer Joseph Schwantner.

The title derives from evestrum, a term attributed to Paracelsus which refers to the incorporeal body; thus, the title alludes to a dreamt out-of-body experience in Antoni Gaudí's Cathedral of the Sagrada Família in Barcelona, Spain.

=== "The Infernal Machine" ===
"The Infernal Machine" was composed for the University of Michigan Symphony Orchestra and completed March on 21, 1981. It premiered May 9, 1981, at the Evian Festival in France, with Gustav Meier leading the University of Michigan Symphony Orchestra. Rouse dedicated the work to his friend and fellow composer Leslie Bassett, who was also a professor at the University of Michigan.

Though "The Infernal Machine" was originally intended as a stand-alone piece, Rouse later decided to make it a second movement in an orchestral triptych at the suggestion of Joseph Schwantner; thus, it was the first completed movement of Phantasmata. The piece derives its title from the eponymous play by Jean Cocteau, though the actual narrative did not influence Rouse's composition.

Daniel Cariaga of the Los Angeles Times called the work "a perpetual-motion construct clearly designed to warm up both players and listeners through an illusion of frenzy".

=== "Bump" ===
"Bump" was completed January 22, 1985, and is dedicated to longtime St. Louis Symphony conductor Leonard Slatkin.

Rouse originally conceived the piece as "La Valse meets Studio 54", but it ultimately fashioned what he called a "nightmare konga". The work blends big band brass writing and jazz syncopations with dissonant elements of atonalism. Rouse also described the piece as a "Boston Pops tour performance in Hell",
