= Compline (composition) =

Chamber composition by Christopher Rouse

Compline is a septet for flute, clarinet, harp, and string quartet by the American composer Christopher Rouse. The work was commissioned by the Chamber Music Society of Lincoln Center through an award from the Koussevitzky Music Foundation. It was first performed by the Chamber Music Society of Lincoln Center on December 6, 1996 at Alice Tully Hall in the Lincoln Center for the Performing Arts. The piece is dedicated to the memory of Natalie and Serge Koussevitzky.

== Composition ==
Compline is composed in four connected sections and has a duration of roughly 16 minutes. It is scored for the same instrumentation as Maurice Ravel's Introduction and Allegro.

=== Style and inspiration ===
Rouse described the title and inspiration for Compline in the score program notes, writing:

The title refers to the seventh (and final) canonical hour in the Catholic church. As a result, some may conclude that it is a religious work. However, what religiosity Compline may contain is more observational than participatory, reminiscent perhaps of various scores by Respighi in which religious elements are included. For me, Compline is first and foremost a souvenir of my 1989 trip to Rome, a city I fell in love with instantly and that is, of course, dominated by the twin cultures of the ancient Roman Empire and the Roman Catholic church. In Compline, as in Rome itself, the sound of bells is never far away.

He added, "Unlike the majority of other works I composed in the half dozen years before it, Compline does not concern itself with death but rather with light. In this it perhaps augurs a change in my musical outlook."

== Reception ==
Bernard Holland of The New York Times called the piece "serious, skillful music" and wrote:

Mr. Rouse's string repetitions at the beginning are bright and hard; their textures are pierced by raucous, virtuosic quasi-bird calls from the two winds. Soon the music draws back into a kind of nightscape, flute and harp singing against strings in close harmony. At the end, the repetitive figures bounce between various solo instruments as the general mood sinks into a quiet stasis.

James C. Taylor of the Los Angeles Times called it "a dense work for seven instruments" with moments "that sneak up on one's ears and offer real delight." Alan Rich of LA Weekly called the music "attractive" and compared the piece favorably to Ravel's Introduction and Allegro, writing, "Smart coattail riding, that, and smart music as well."
