= Tim Smith (journalist) =

American music critic

- Born: Washington D.C., U.S.
- Education: Eisenhower College (BA); Occidental College (MA)
- Occupation: Music critic
- Notable credits: The Baltimore Sun; South Florida Sun Sentinel

Tim Smith is an American music critic who specializes in classical music. He was chief classical music critic for The Baltimore Sun from 2000 to 2019.

== Life and career ==
Born in Washington, D.C., he received a B.A. in music history from Eisenhower College and an M.A. in music history from Occidental College, Los Angeles. He was a freelance reviewer for The Washington Star and The Washington Post before becoming classical music critic at the South Florida Sun Sentinel in 1981. He joined the staff of The Baltimore Sun in 2000, serving as classical music critic and, starting in 2009, also as theater critic. He retired in November 2019, after a year handling a third beat as restaurant critic, when the paper began limiting performing arts reviews. He currently has a blog called "By Tim Smith."

Smith has also written for The New York Times, Opera News, BBC Music Magazine and other publications.

In 1998, he received a first place award from the American Association of Sunday and Feature Editors for Excellence in Feature Writing: Arts Criticism.

Smith was elected president of the Music Critics Association of North America in 2005 and served two terms.

In 2002, Perigee Books published Smith's NPR Curious Listener's Guide to Classical Music.
