= Edward Rothstein =

American musicologist and cultural critic (born 1952)

Edward Benjamin Rothstein (born October 16, 1952) is an American cultural critic. Rothstein wrote music criticism early in his career, but is best known for his critical analysis of museums and museum exhibitions.

== Education ==
Rothstein holds a B.A. from Yale University (1973), an M.A. in English literature from Columbia University, and a Ph.D. from the Committee on Social Thought at the University of Chicago (1994). In addition, Rothstein did graduate work in mathematics at Brandeis University.

== Career ==
Rothstein worked at The New York Times for 20 years, from 1994 to 2014, but took a buyout (a cash payout offered to employees, with compensation based on a sliding scale of the number of years they spent working for the employer) from the newspaper and joined The Wall Street Journal as a Critic at Large in 2015. He wrote in 2020 that "At The New York Times, freedom of speech gave way to group pressure, and debate turned into intimidation".

Rothstein was the chief music critic for the Times, and then the paper's cultural critic-at-large, particularly examining the reach and depth of museums, large and small. He was previously a music critic for The New Republic, and worked briefly as an editor at Macmillan's Free Press imprint in the mid-1980s.

== Awards and honors ==
Rothstein is a two-time winner of the ASCAP Deems Taylor Award for music criticism, and was awarded a Guggenheim Fellowship in 1991.

== Writings ==
- "Mozart: In Search of the Roots of Genius", Smithsonian, February, 2006.
- "Contemplating Churchill", Smithsonian, March, 2005.
- Visions of Utopia (New York Public Library Lectures in Humanities), with Herbert Muschamp and Martin E. Marty (Oxford University Press, 2004) ISBN 0-19-517161-6.
- 1998 Diary in Slate
- Emblems of Mind: The Inner Life of Music and Mathematics (Times Books, 1995;University of Chicago Press, 2006).
- Foreword to Arthur Loesser's Men, Women and Pianos: A Social History (1991).

- Archive of Rothstein's articles in The Wall Street Journal
- Archive of Rothstein's articles in The New York Times
- Archive of Rothstein's tech columns in The New York Times
- Archive of Rothstein's essays 1979-90 in The New York Review of Books
