= David Zinman =

American conductor (born 1936)

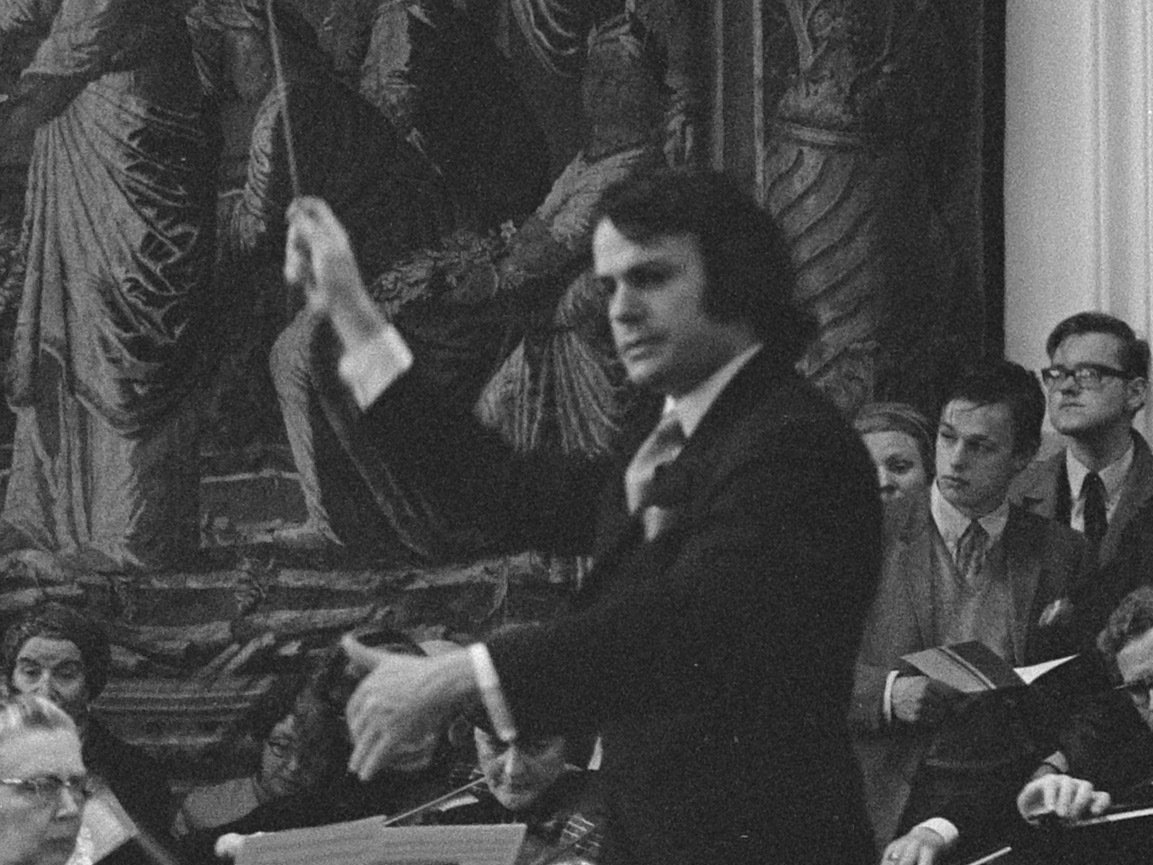
David Zinman conducting the Netherlands Chamber Orchestra in 1971

David Zinman (born July 9, 1936) is an American conductor.

== Early life and education ==
Zinman was born in 1936 in New York City. After violin studies at Oberlin Conservatory, Zinman studied theory and composition at the University of Minnesota, earning his M.A. in 1963. He took up conducting at Tanglewood and from 1958 to 1962 worked in Maine with Pierre Monteux; he served as Monteux's assistant from 1961 to 1964.

== Career ==
=== Netherlands ===
Zinman held the post of second conductor of the Netherlands Chamber Orchestra from 1965 to 1977 and was principal conductor of the Rotterdam Philharmonic Orchestra from 1979 to 1982.

=== United States ===
Zinman served as music director of the Rochester Philharmonic Orchestra from 1974 to 1985, during the last two years of which tenure he also was principal guest conductor of the Baltimore Symphony Orchestra. He became music director in Baltimore in 1985. There he made several recordings for Telarc, Argo, and Sony. He also toured widely and began to implement ideas from the historically-informed-performance movement in interpretations of the Beethoven symphonies. Upon relinquishing that Baltimore post in 1998, Zinman was named the orchestra's conductor laureate. But he renounced this title three years later in protest at what he saw as the orchestra's increasingly conservative programming.

In 1998 Zinman worked as music director of the Ojai Music Festival alongside pianist Mitsuko Uchida. That same year he was appointed music director of the Aspen Music Festival and School, where he founded and directed its American Academy of Conducting until his sudden resignation in April 2010.

=== Switzerland ===
Zinman became music director of the Tonhalle-Orchester Zürich in 1995. His innovative programming with that orchestra included a series of late-night concerts, "Tonhalle Late", which combined classical music and a nightclub setting. His recordings of the complete Beethoven symphonies for Arte Nova were based on the Jonathan Del Mar critical edition and was acclaimed by critics. He subsequently recorded Beethoven's overtures and concertos with the Tonhalle. He conducted the Tonhalle Orchestra in its first-ever appearance at The Proms in 2003. He concluded his Tonhalle music directorship on July 21, 2014, with a concert at The Proms.

=== Film scores ===
Zinman conducted the soundtrack of the 1993 film of the New York City Ballet production of Tchaikovsky's Nutcracker. In 2009 he led the Tonhalle-Orchester Zürich in the filmscore 180°: If Your World Is Suddenly Upside-Down, composed by the sibling trio Diego Baldenweg with Nora Baldenweg and Lionel Baldenweg; this won the Suisa prize for "Best Original Score" at the Locarno Film Festival in 2010.

== Awards ==
In 2006, he received the Theodore Thomas Award presented by the Conductors' Guild. He has received five Grammy Awards, two Grand Prix du Disque, and two Edison Awards for his recordings, including a Grammy Award for Best Classical Album.

=== Best-selling recording ===
Zinman's 1992 recording of Henryk Górecki’s Symphony no.3 with Dawn Upshaw and the London Sinfonietta was an international bestseller.

== Personal life ==
Zinman's first marriage to Leslie Heyman ended in divorce. He later was married to Mary Zinman, an Australian violist. Mary Zinman died in April 2025. Zinman has two sons and a daughter, including recording engineer Paul Zinman.

Cultural offices
Preceded by Edo de Waart	Music Director, Rotterdam Philharmonic Orchestra; 1979–1982	Succeeded by James Conlon
