= BBC Music Magazine =

British monthly classical music magazine

- Cover of the July 2024 issue with attached cover CD
- Editor: Charlotte Smith
- Former editors: Oliver Condy
- Categories: Music magazine
- Frequency: 13 per annum
- Total circulation: 37,530
- First issue: September 1992
- Company: Our Media
- Country: United Kingdom
- Language: English
- Website: www.classical-music.com

BBC Music Magazine is a British monthly magazine that focuses primarily on classical music.

The first issue appeared in September 1992. Since March 1993 an edition of BBC Music Magazine has been published in North America. BBC Worldwide, the commercial subsidiary of the BBC, was the original owner and publisher together with Warner Music Enterprises during its initial phase. Immediate Media Company became the publisher in 2012. Our Media became the publisher in 2023.

The content of the magazine reflects the broadcast output of BBC Radio 3, which is devoted primarily to classical music, but also broadcasts some jazz and world music. Each edition comes with an audio CD, often including BBC recordings of full-length works. The magazine features articles on subjects such as favourite conductors and trends in 21st-century classical music.

The magazine's circulation was 37,530 as of 2008. Profits "are returned to the BBC".

Previous editors of the magazine have included Helen Wallace and Oliver Condy. Charlotte Smith has been its editor since January 2022.
