= 2013 in music =

This topic covers notable events and articles related to 2013 in music.

== Specific locations ==
- African music
- American music
- Australian music
- British music
- Canadian music
- Chinese music
- Danish music
- European music (Continental Europe)
- Finnish music
- French music
- German music
- Indian music
- Irish music
- Japanese music
- Malaysian music
- Mongolian music
- North Korean music
- Norwegian music
- Philippine music
- Polynesian music
- Scandinavian music
- South Korean music
- Swedish music
- Vietnamese music

== Specific genres ==
- Alternative
- Classical
- Country
- Electronic
- Heavy metal
- Hip-hop
- Jazz
- Latin
- Opera
- Progressive rock
- Rock
- K-pop
- J-pop

== Albums released ==
=== Highest critically reviewed albums (Metacritic) ===
List of albums which received "universal acclaim" at Metacritic
| Number | Artist | Album | Average score | Number of reviews | Reference |
|---|---|---|---|---|---|
| 1 | James Hunter | Minute by Minute | 86 | 8 reviews | |

== Awards ==
| Category/Organization | 2013 MTV Video Music Awards August 25, 2013 | 2013 MTV Europe Music Awards November 10, 2013 | American Music Awards of 2013 November 24, 2013 | 2014 Grammy Awards January 26, 2014 | 2014 Billboard Music Awards May 18, 2014 |
|---|---|---|---|---|---|
| Best Album | N/A | N/A | N/A | Random Access Memories; Daft Punk | The 20/20 Experience; Justin Timberlake |
| Best Song | N/A | "Locked Out of Heaven"; Bruno Mars | "Cruise"; Florida Georgia Line featuring Nelly | "Get Lucky"; Daft Punk featuring Pharrell Williams and Nile Rodgers | "Blurred Lines"; Robin Thicke featuring T.I. and Pharrell Williams |
| Best Video | "Mirrors"; Justin Timberlake | "Wrecking Ball"; Miley Cyrus | N/A | "Suit & Tie"; Justin Timberlake featuring Jay Z | "Wrecking Ball"; Miley Cyrus |
| Best Artist | N/A | N/A | Taylor Swift | N/A | Justin Timberlake |
| Best New Artist | Austin Mahone | Macklemore & Ryan Lewis | Ariana Grande | Macklemore & Ryan Lewis | Lorde |

== Bands formed ==
See Musical groups established in 2013

== Bands reformed ==
- All Saints
- Black Flag
- The Calling
- Danity Kane
- Daughters
- Failure
- The Fall of Troy
- Fall Out Boy
- Jurassic 5
- King Crimson
- Medicine
- Neutral Milk Hotel
- Nine Inch Nails
- The Postal Service
- Rocket from the Crypt
- Story of the Year
- TLC
- Violent Femmes

== Bands disbanded ==
See Musical groups disestablished in 2013

== Deaths ==
=== January ===
- 1 – Patti Page (85), American pop and country music singer
- 4 – Sammy Johns (66), American country music singer-songwriter
- 11 – John Wilkinson, 67, American guitarist (Elvis Presley's TCB Band) and singer
- 19 – Steve Knight (77), American musician (Mountain)
- 21 – Bob Dawdy (70), American rock and roll guitarist (The Velaires)
- 25 – Cecil Womack (65), American singer (Womack & Womack)
- 26 – Leroy "Sugarfoot" Bonner (69), American funk singer and guitarist (Ohio Players)
- 30 – Patty Andrews (94), American singer (The Andrews Sisters)

=== February ===
- 4 – Reg Presley (71), British singer and songwriter (The Troggs)
- 6 – Mo-Do (46), Italian musician
- 11
  - Rick Huxley (72), English musician (The Dave Clark Five)
  - Kevin Peek (66), Australian musician (Sky)
- 16
  - Stanley Knight (64), American guitarist (Black Oak Arkansas)
  - Tony Sheridan (72), English rock and roll singer, early collaborator with The Beatles
- 18
  - Kevin Ayers (68), English psychedelic rock songwriter and musician (Soft Machine)
  - Damon Harris (62), American soul and R&B singer (The Temptations)
- 27 – Van Cliburn (78), American pianist

=== March ===
- 1
  - Jewel Akens (79), American R&B singer
  - Dorothy Howard (84), Canadian mezzo-soprano, opera director, and voice teacher
- 3 – Bobby Rogers (73), American soul singer and songwriter (The Miracles)
- 6 – Alvin Lee (68), English blues-rock guitarist (Ten Years After)
- 7
  - Kenny Ball (82), English jazz trumpeter
  - Peter Banks (65), English rock guitarist (Yes, Flash)
  - Claude King (90), American country music singer
- 16 – Jason Molina (39), American musician, singer and songwriter (Songs: Ohia, Magnolia Electric Co.)

=== April ===
- 3 – Chris Bailey (62), Australian bass guitarist (The Angels)
- 8 – Annette Funicello (70), American actress (The Mickey Mouse Club) and singer
- 9 – Emilio Pericoli (85), Italian singer
- 14 – Sir Colin Davis, British conductor, 85
- 17 – Sita Chan (26), Hong Kong Cantopop singer
- 21 – Chrissy Amphlett (53), Australian singer (Divinyls)
- 22
  - Richie Havens (72), American folk singer and guitarist
  - Nathaniel Romerson (75), American R&B singer (The Ballads)
- 26 – George Jones (81), American country music singer and songwriter

=== May ===
- 1 – Chris Kelly (34), American rap artist (Kris Kross)
- 3 – Mimi Aarden (89), Dutch operatic mezzo-soprano
- 7
  - Peter Rauhofer (48), Austrian DJ, remixer and record producer
  - Romanthony (45), American DJ, record producer and singer
- 17 – Alan O'Day (72), American singer-songwriter
- 18 – Marek Jackowski (66), Polish rock musician (Maanam)
- 20
  - Ray Manzarek (74), American rock musician (The Doors)
  - Zach Sobiech (18), American pop singer and viral video performer
- 21 – Trevor Bolder (62), British musician (David Bowie, Uriah Heep)
- 24 – Lorene Mann (76), American country music singer and songwriter
- 25 – Tyrone Brunson (57), American musician

=== June ===
- 1 - Richard Raines (48), American guitarist (Perfect Stranger)
- 4 – Joey Covington (67), American musician (Jefferson Airplane)
- 5 – Don Bowman (75), American comedian, country singer and songwriter
- 14 – Tom Tall (75), American rockabilly singer
- 15 – Robert Morris "B.J." Jones (70), American rock guitarist (Sweathog)
- 19 – Slim Whitman (90), American country singer-songwriter
- 21 – Mary Love (69), American soul and gospel singer
- 23 – Bobby Bland (83), American blues and soul singer
- 24
  - Sammy Hall, 67, American garage rock singer (The Birdwatchers)
  - Puff Johnson (40), American pop singer and songwriter
  - Alan Myers (58), American rock drummer (Devo)

=== July ===
- 4 – Bernie Nolan (52), Irish singer (The Nolans) and actress
- 13 – Cory Monteith (31), Canadian actor (Glee) and singer
- 21 – WanBi Tuấn Anh (26), Vietnamese singer, musician, actor and model
- 26 – J.J. Cale (74), American guitarist, singer, and songwriter
- 30 – Nick Nixon (74), American country music singer-songwriter

=== August ===
- 5 – George Duke (67), American jazz fusion keyboardist
- 8 – Jack Clement (82), American record and film producer, songwriter and singer
- 10 – Eydie Gormé (84), American singer
- 13
  - Jon Brookes (44), English rock drummer (The Charlatans)
  - Tompall Glaser (79), American country music singer
- 14 – Allen Lanier (67), American rock keyboardist and guitarist (Blue Öyster Cult)

=== September ===
- 9 – Forrest (60), American singer
- 11 – Jimmy Fontana (78), Italian singer-songwriter
- 12 – Joan Regan (85), British traditional pop singer
- 15 – Jackie Lomax (69), English guitarist and singer-songwriter
- 16 – Mac Curtis (74), American rockabilly singer
- 17 – Marvin Rainwater (88), American country and rockabilly singer
- 25 – Billy Mure (97), American guitarist

=== October ===
- 8
  - Larry Verne (77), American singer
  - Philip Chevron (56), Irish musician (The Pogues)
- 10
  - Jan Kuehnemund (51), American musician (Vixen)
  - Cal Smith (81), American country music singer
- 19 – Noel Harrison (79), British singer and actor
- 20 – Leon Ashley (77), American country music singer
- 26 – Al Johnson (65), American soul singer (The Unifics)
- 27 – Lou Reed (71), American rock musician and songwriter (The Velvet Underground)
- 30 – Pete Haycock (62), English guitarist (Climax Blues Band)
- 31 – Bobby Parker (76), American blues-rock guitarist

=== November ===
- 2 – Jack Alexander (77), Scottish folk singer and pianist (The Alexander Brothers)
- 6 – Clyde Stacy (77), American rockabilly singer and guitarist
- 11 – Bob Beckham (86), American music publisher and country singer
- 29
  - Dick Dodd (68), American musician (The Bel-Airs, The Standells)
  - Oliver Cheatham (65), American R&B singer

=== December ===
- 2 – Junior Murvin (67), Jamaican reggae singer
- 8 – Hung Sin Nui (88), Cantonese opera singer
- 16 – Ray Price (87), American country music singer
- 23 – Yusef Lateef (93), American saxophonist

== Musical films ==
- Begin Again

== See also ==
- Timeline of musical events
- Women in music
- 2013 in television
