= Ballada (album) =

- CD only cover

Compilation album by Namie Amuro
- Released: June 4, 2014
- Recorded: 1996–2014
- Genres: Pop; R&B
- Length: 76:21
- Languages: Japanese; English
- Label: Dimension Point
- Producers: Various: Jun Abe; Dallas Austin; Hiroaki Hayami; Masaki Iehara; Cozy Kubo; Tetsuya Komuro; Ryoki Matsumoto; Monk; Nao'ymt; U-Key Zone; T-SK; JD Walker; Zetton

Namie Amuro chronology
| Feel (2013) | Ballada (2014) | Genic (2015) |

Alternative cover
- CD/DVD and digital download editions' cover

Singles from Ballada
- 1. "Tsuki" Released: January 29, 2014

Ballada is the sixth compilation by Japanese recording artist Namie Amuro. It was released by Dimension Point on June 4, 2014 in three physical formats, and via digital distribution. It is a concept album that compiles ballads released during her time with Avex Trax, including three re-worked tracks. Additionally, the album features its only single "Tsuki".

Upon its release, Ballada received positive reviews from music critics, most whom praised Amuro's maturity and vocals, alongside the re-worked tracks. Commercially, it was a success in Japan, reaching the top spot on the Oricon Albums Chart and Billboard Hot Albums Chart. It was certified double platinum by the Recording Industry Association of Japan (RIAJ), recognizing shipments of 500,000 units. To promote the album, Amuro conducted her annual Live Style tour from August to December 2014. A live release—titled Namie Amuro Live Style 2014—was issued inside Asia, and was a commercial success in Japan.

== Background and release ==
In early 2013, Amuro started her own record label titled Dimension Point, offering her 11th studio album Feel (2013) as its first commercial work. She then released a series of digital singles: "Neonlight Lipstick" and "Ballerina". These tracks were included on her January 2014 recording "Tsuki", a ballad written for the Japanese film Dakishimetai: Shinjitsu no Monogatari (2014). A month later, the singer revealed a special website that included a voting poll with all her ballad songs on it; it was later revealed that selected tracks would appear on Ballada. Not long after, Amuro announced the release of Ballada. Out of 38 ballads listed on voting poll, 15 were selected. All apart from four tracks were featured in their original form; "Sweet 19 Blues" and "Can You Celebrate?" were re-recorded for the compilation; "Tsuki" being the only new recording added to the release; and "Contrail" being re-recorded and re-arranged by Nao'ymt, who produced the original version. Japanese composer Taro Hakase was credited as a featured artist on "Can You Celebrate?", performing the violin.

Ballada was released by Dimension Point and Avex Trax on June 4, 2014 in three physical formats, and via digital distribution. The three physical formats include a standard package that includes a 15-track compact disc, and the other two are DVD and Blu-Ray bundles that include 17 music videos, respectively. Included in the DVD/Blu-Ray formats are re-created visuals of her singles "Sweet 19 Blues"—blending a mixture of the original video and new footage of Amuro in the same setting—and a completely re-done video of "Can You Celebrate?". The cover art and photoshoot were photographed by Yasunari Kikuma, which features Amuro sitting in an empty room, wearing a red plaid dress and military-esque hat; additionally, art direction and the album's booklet were designed by Masaru Yoshikawa from AEI. First-press editions come with a digipak and a special lenticular photographic print, alongside a generic poster of the album's photoshoot.

== Reception ==
Upon its release, Ballada received positive reviews from music critics. Japanese magazine CDJournal praised Amuro's "subtle vocal techniques" and "rich emotional expression" displayed in the ballad collection. Kanako Hayakawa of EMTG felt that no matter which era of Amuro's music the songs were from, her ballads showcased the strength of women, where fragile parts of herself were sung with boldly real vocals. She felt that her ballads had similar lyrical matters to her up-tempo songs, such as the joy of feeling loved or someone starting again after a loss. Hayakawa felt that many of the songs on the compilation were not strictly ballads, such as the mid-tempo R&B "Sweet 19 Blues", the 1990s UK club jazz "Dreaming I Was Dreaming", and the slow R&B "White Light". Hayakawa praised the album's re-recorded tracks, noting the "divine beauty" of the Taro Hakase pairing and the dignity in her voice.

Commercially, the album was a success in Asia. Ballada debuted at number one on the daily and weekly Oricon Albums Chart in Japan, opening with a six-day sales of 254,944 copies; this made it Amuro's highest-selling first week sales for a compilation since Best Fiction in 2008. It remained at number one on the weekly chart for a second run, but only shifted 66,274 units. In total, Ballada lasted six weeks in the top ten, and stayed in the top 300 chart for 55 weeks. Additionally, it was ranked the fourth best-selling album of 2014 with 431,356 copies sold in Japan, making Amuro the highest-selling solo artist in terms of album sales that year. Ballada was certified double platinum by the Recording Industry Association of Japan (RIAJ) for shipments of 500,000 units.

Ballada reached number six on the Taiwanese G-Music chart, and topped the East Asian category for a sole week. In September 2017, Amuro announced her retirement from the music industry. Because of this, her music catalogue skyrocketed on several digital stores; Ballada was included, and debuted at number 7 on the Oricon Digital Albums Chart with sales of 1,933 copies. In total, the compilation has achieved 3,541 recognized digital downloads.

== Promotion ==
In order to promote the album, Amuro announced her annual Live Style tour in early April 2014. The dates were confirmed via a flyer given out with purchases of Ballada, enclosed in the album's booklet. Tickets were offered to the public that were subscribed to the singer's Fan Space fan club, which gave them early access and a unique code to submit to secure tickets; the entire ticket system was handled as a general lottery. A total of 36 shows in thirteen different cities were scheduled in Japan, spanning from August 22 at the Shizuoka Eco-Pure Arena, and finishing on December 23 at the Yoyogi National Gymnasium in Shibuya, Tokyo. One show in Kobe was cancelled for unknown reasons, but rescheduled two extra dates. In order to promote the material from Ballada, Amuro added a particular song from the album on the setlist of every performance.

A live album and DVD/Blu-Ray were recorded at the Yoyogi National Gym on November 6, alongside a bonus disc that featured the selected ballads performed. A total of 30 songs were added on the track list, alongside the bonus disc that included an extra 11 live recordings. Titled Namie Amuro Live Style 2014, the formats were a success in Japan; it reached the top spot on the Oricon DVD and Blu-Ray Chart, and was certified gold by the Recording Industry Association of Japan (RIAJ) for shipments of 100,000 copies.

== Track listing ==
| No. | Title | Lyrics | Music | Length |
|---|---|---|---|---|
| 1. | "Sweet 19 Blues" (new vocal) | Tetsuya Komuro | T. Komuro | 5:33 |
| 2. | "Can You Celebrate?" (featuring Taro Hakase; new vocal) | T. Komuro | T. Komuro | 6:16 |
| 3. | "Dreaming I Was Dreaming" | Marc Panther, T. Komuro | Cozy Kubo | 4:43 |
| 4. | "Never End" | T. Komuro | T. Komuro | 5:15 |
| 5. | "Himawari" (Sunflower) | T. Komuro | T. Komuro | 4:46 |
| 6. | "Think of Me" | Dallas Austin, Junko Kudo | D. Austin | 4:28 |
| 7. | "I Will" | Namie Amuro | Hiroaki Hayama | 5:34 |
| 8. | "Wishing on the Same Star" | Diane Warren, Kenko-P | D. Warren | 4:25 |
| 9. | "Four Seasons" | Jusme | Monk | 3:50 |
| 10. | "All for You" | Natsumi Watanabe | Ryoki Matsumoto | 5:58 |
| 11. | "White Light" | Nao'ymt | Nao'ymt | 5:17 |
| 12. | "The Meaning of Us" | Momo "Mocha" N. | Momo "Mocha" N., U-Key Zone | 4:26 |
| 13. | "Love Story" | Tiger | T-SK, Kim Tesung, Liv Nero, Mim Nervo | 4:44 |
| 14. | "Let Me Let You Go" | Shelly Peiken, JD Walker | S. Peiken, JD Walker | 4:03 |
| 15. | "Tsuki" (Moon) | Tiger | Zetton, Fastlane, Lisa Desmond | 3:36 |
| 16. | "Contrail (Ballada Ver.)" (bonus track) | Nao'ymt | Nao'ymt | 3:19 |
| Total length: | | | | 76:21 |

DVD/Blu-ray
| No. | Title | Director | Length |
|---|---|---|---|
| 1. | "Sweet 19 Blues" | Wataru Takeishi | 5:38 |
| 2. | "Can You Celebrate?" | W. Takeishi | 6:15 |
| 3. | "Dreaming I Was Dreaming" | Masashi Muto | 4:43 |
| 4. | "Never End" | M. Muto | 5:15 |
| 5. | "Himawari" | YKBX | 4:46 |
| 6. | "Think of Me" | M. Muto | 4:28 |
| 7. | "I Will" | M. Muto | 5:34 |
| 8. | "Wishing on the Same Star" | M. Muto | 4:25 |
| 9. | "Four Seasons" | YKBX | 3:50 |
| 10. | "All for You" | M. Muto | 5:58 |
| 11. | "White Light" | M. Muto | 5:17 |
| 12. | "The Meaning of Us" | Shigeaki Kubo | 4:26 |
| 13. | "Love Story" | Kensuke Kawamura | 4:44 |
| 14. | "Let Me Let You Go" | Daisuke "Nino" Ninimoya | 4:03 |
| 15. | "Tsuki" | Naokazu Mitsuishi | 3:36 |
| 16. | "Sweet 19 Blues" (new video) | Kanji Suto | 5:33 |
| 17. | "Can You Celebrate?" (new video) | K. Kawamura | 6:16 |

== Charts ==
=== Weekly charts ===
| Chart (2014–2015) | Peak position |
|---|---|
| Japanese Albums (Oricon) | 1 |
| Taiwanese Albums (G-Music) | 6 |
| Taiwanese East Asia Albums (G-Music) | 1 |

=== Monthly charts ===
| Chart (2014) | Peak position |
|---|---|
| Japanese Albums (Oricon) | 1 |

=== Year-end charts ===
| Chart (2014) | Position |
|---|---|
| Japanese Albums (Oricon) | 4 |

== Certification and sales ==
| Region | Certification | Certified units/sales |
|---|---|---|
| Japan (RIAJ) | 2× Platinum | 444,165 |

== Release history ==
| Region | Date | Format | Label | Catalogue codes |
|---|---|---|---|---|
| Japan | June 4, 2014 | CD; CD/DVD; CD/Blu-ray; digital download | Dimension Point | AVCN-99010/B, AVCN-99011/B, AVCN-99012 |
| South Korea | June 5, 2014 | Digital download | SM Entertainment | |
| Hong Kong | June 17, 2014 | CD; CD/DVD | Sony Music | 88843093622, 88843093832 |
| Japan | June 21, 2014 | Rental CD | Dimension Point | AVCN-99012 |
