= 2013 in European music =

2013 in continental European music in geographical order.

== Scandinavia ==
- Swedish DJ Avicii has a pan-European hit with "Wake Me Up!" with vocals from Aloe Blacc which tops the charts in more than 10 countries. The song is co-written by Incubus' Mike Einziger. His next single, "You Make Me" featuring Salem Al Fakir, is only a local No. 1 but the third one, "Hey Brother", tops the charts in seven European countries. His first album True is a No. 1 in Scandinavia and top5 in the US and most European countries.
- Swedish House Mafia make their final appearance at the Ultra Music Festival in March 2013.
- After winning the Eurovision Song Contest 2013 in Malmö Danish singer Emmelie de Forest also tops the domestic charts with Only Teardrops.
- Sixty-seven-year-old folk singer Kim Larsen tops the Danish album charts with "Du glade verden" for six weeks.
- Danish rock bandVolbeat are No. 1 in five countries with their album Outlaw Gentlemen & Shady Ladies and the first time in the US top 10.
- 4–7 July Scandinavia's biggest Rock event, the Roskilde Festival, features acts like Kraftwerk, Metallica, The National, Queens of the stone age, Rihanna, Sigur Ros, Slipknot and local heroes Volbeat.

== Netherlands ==
- Anouk's album Sad Singalong Songs tops the charts. She came 9th at the Eurovision song contest with Birds.
- DJ Martin Garrix's instrumental Animals is a No. 1 in England and Ireland and cracks most European Top10s.

== Belgium ==
- Milk Inc. become Flanders Ultratop No. 1 with "Undercover".
- Stromae's second album Racine carrée is sensationally successful in francophone countries, No. 1 in Switzerland, 7× platinum in Belgium and even Diamond in France. It also tops the Dutch and Italian charts. Papaoutai, Formidable and Tous les mêmes are all No. 1 singles.
- There are several major festivals, the biggest, Rock Werchter, and award-winning Dance music festival Tomorrowland take place in July, Pukkelpop in August

== Germany ==
- Seventy-four-year-old Schlager music star Heino surprises with "Mit freundlichen Grüßen" ("Kind Regards"), an album full of cover versions of bands like Rammstein, Die Ärzte, Peter Fox and Die Fantastischen Vier. It tops the German album charts for four weeks and earns Gold for being sold over 100,000 times. It nets him an unlikely concert gig with Rammstein at the Heavy Metal Wacken Open Air festival.
- Controversial German-speaking Italian/South Tyrolean band Frei.Wild are excluded from the 2013 Echo Awards after several other nominees protest against their perceived right wing political views. Their 8th album Feinde deiner Feinde tops the German charts, though.
- Rapper Cro adds more songs to his Platinum album Raop, calling it Raop +5, including his first German No. 1 single "Whatever". He wins Best artist Hip Hop/Urban and Best Newcomer at the Echo Awards.
- Other Echo winners include Die Toten Hosen for Best album Ballast der Republik and Best single Tage wie diese, Deichkind are with "Befehl von ganz unten" best Dance act, Unheilig win Best Group Rock/Alternative (national) with Lichter der Stadt.
- In July, a collaboration of little-known rapper Shindy and major star Bushido is released, the album title is NWA (Nie wieder arbeiten) and features the scandal single Stress ohne Grund on which Bushido phantasizes about torturing or killing politicians like Claudia Roth and Serkan Tören and bashes homosexuals. The Bundesprüfstelle stops the sale of the album to minors in Germany and the video of the single is pulled from YouTube. Several people press charges against Bushido.
- Schlager singer Andrea Berg has her seventh No. 1 album in a row with "Atlantis".
- Even though Kurdish-German rapper Haftbefehl's song "Chabos wissen wer der Babo ist" only climbs to No. 30 in the German charts it influences German youth language as the Zazaki word "Babo" ( father, chief ) is elected Langenscheidt's "youth word of the year".
- Russian-German DJ Zedd has a global hit with Stay the night ft Hayley Williams which is only No. 15 in Germany but a No. 2 in the UK, gets platinum in Australia and sells more than 1 million copies in the U.S.

== Switzerland ==
- DJ Antoine who rose to international prominence with his 2011 hits Ma Chérie and Welcome to St. Tropez has another hit album with Sky Is the Limit, a local No. 1 and No. 6 in Germany.

== France ==
- Charity project Les Enfoirés tops the charts with "La boîte à musique des Enfoirés".
- Daft Punk rise to the top in June with the album Random Access Memories. Their single Get Lucky featuring Pharrell Williams tops the charts in many countries and sells over 7 mio copies. At the 56th Annual Grammy Awards the single wins Record of the Year, the album Album of the Year and Best Dance/Electronica Album, the band wins a fourth award for Best Pop Solo Performance.
- Christophe Maé has his fifth straight No. 1 album in France and Belgium with "Je veux du bonheur".
- Jazzy singer-songwriter Isabelle Geffroy, better known as Zaz whose 2010 debut Zaz became Platinum in six countries and even Diamond in France releases her second album with Recto verso, it is top 5 in six countries but not as successful as the debut.
- French electronic duo Klingande top the charts of Germany, Austria, Switzerland, Belgium and Italy with their single "Jubel"

== Portugal ==
- Tony Carreira tops the album charts for 20 weeks with "Essencial". *Fado star Ana Moura has a chart topper with "Desfado".

== Spain ==
- Former El Canto del Loco singer Dani Martín tops both single and album charts with "Cero" and "Dani Martín No.1".
- Alejandro Sanz wins "Best Contemporary Pop Vocal Album" at the Latin Grammy Awards of 2013 with La Música No Se Toca.

== Italy ==
- Marco Mengoni, who won the third Italian series of talent show X Factor in 2009, is crowned the winner of the 63rd Sanremo Music Festival with his entry "L'essenziale", which later holds the first spot of the Italian FIMI Top Digital Downloads chart for eight consecutive weeks, and is launched as the lead single from the number-one album #prontoacorrere. It also came 7th in the Eurovision Song Contest 2013.
- Milan-based band Modà's fifth studio album, Gioia, debuts at number-one on the Italian Albums Chart and is certified triple platinum by the Federation of the Italian Music Industry.
- 2010 winner of talent show Amici di Maria De Filippi Emma Marrone has a number-one album with Schiena.
- After becoming the first rapper to compete in Amici di Maria de Filippi, Moreno wins the talent show, beating runner-up Greta Manuzi, and releases his debut album Stecca, which spends eight weeks at number one on the Italian charts and is certified double platinum by the Federation of the Italian Music Industry.

== Eastern Europe/ Balkans ==
- Romanian Alexandra Stan who had a million-seller with Mr. Saxobeat in 2011 is hospitalised in June and files a criminal complaint against her agent and former fiancée Marcel Prodan.
- July's Open'er Festival in Gdynia on the North coast of Poland sees Blur, Arctic Monkeys, Queens of the Stone Age, Kings of Leon and Rihanna
- The Balkans' most famous festival Exit takes place in the Petrovaradin Fortress of Novi Sad, Serbia featuring CeeLo Green, Snoop Dogg, and David Guetta,
- Balaton Sound is a major electronic festival in Hungary in July
- Republic Z (formerly known as "Kazantip"), an August two-week electronic dance party on Ukraine's Crimean Peninsula attracts 150,000 party guests
- 6-day Sziget Festival takes place in Budapest in August with acts like Bad Religion, Empire of the Sun, Franz Ferdinand and Nick Cave and the Bad Seeds
- Belarusian band Bristeil released their debut EP Cyruĺnia Svietu (Barbershop of the World into English).

== Musical films ==
- The Congress (France, Israel, Belgium, Poland, Luxembourg, Germany), with music by Max Richter
- Känn ingen sorg (Sweden), starring Adam Lundgren and Jonathan Andersson, with music and lyrics by Håkan Hellström

== Deaths ==
- 10 January – Franz Lehrndorfer, German organist and composer, 84
- 22 February – Wolfgang Sawallisch, German conductor and pianist, 89
- 28 February – Armando Trovajoli, Italian film composer and pianist, 95
- 21 March – Jean-Michel Damase, French composer, pianist, and teacher, 85
- 4 April – Tommy Tycho, Hungarian-born Australian composer, arranger and orchestra conductor, 84
- 15 April – Jean-François Paillard, French classical conductor, 85
- 20 May – Anders Eliasson, Swedish composer, 66
- 22 May – Henri Dutilleux, French composer, 97
- 6 June – Erling Blöndal Bengtsson, Danish-American cellist, 81
- 9 June – Bruno Bartoletti, Italian conductor, 86
- 27 June – Henrik Otto Donner, Finnish composer and music industry executive, 73
- 11 August – Lamberto Puggelli, Italian stage and opera director, 75
- 4 September – Dick Raaymakers, Dutch composer, theater maker and theorist, 83
- 25 September – Hans-Joachim Rotzsch, German choral conductor, 84
- 7 October – Patrice Chéreau, French film and opera director, 68
- 21 October – Gianni Ferrio, Italian composer, conductor and music arranger, 88
- 29 October – Rudolf Kehrer, German classical pianist, 90
- 6 December – Tom Krause, Finnish opera singer, 79
- 9 December – Barbara Hesse-Bukowska, 83, Polish classical pianist, 83
- 10 December – The Child of Lov, Belgian-Dutch singer, 26
- 12 December – Zbigniew Karkowski, Polish composer, 55
- 21 December – Lars Edlund, Swedish organist and composer, 91
- 29 December – Wojciech Kilar, Polish composer, 81
