= Feel (Namie Amuro album) =

- The cover artwork was used on digital formats.

Studio album by Namie Amuro
- Released: July 10, 2013
- Recorded: 2012–2013
- Studio: Avex Studios (Tokyo); Prime Sound Studios (Tokyo); LAB Recordings (Tokyo)
- Genre: EDM; electro house
- Length: 42:29
- Language: English; Japanese
- Label: Dimension Point
- Producer: Ambience; Mental Audio; DaWood; Dsign Music; Fredro; HyGradem; Adam Kapit; Steven Lee; Anthony Maniscalco; Nao'ymt; JD Walker; Ryuichiro Yamaki; Zedd

Namie Amuro chronology
Uncontrolled (2012)	Feel (2013)	Ballada (2014)

Alternative cover
- CD+DVD edition

Singles from Feel
- 1. "Big Boys Cry"/"Beautiful" Released: March 6, 2013; 2. "Contrail" Released: May 19, 2013; 3. "Hands on Me" Released: July 3, 2013; 4. "Heaven" Released: July 10, 2013

Feel (stylized in all caps) is the eleventh studio album by Japanese recording artist Namie Amuro. It was released on July 10, 2013, in both physical and digital formats, and it is her first studio release through Dimension Point, a sub-division of Amuro's label Avex Trax. Feel, like its predecessor Uncontrolled (2012), features a diverse range of producers and songwriters from outside of Japan, including collaborations with Zedd, Dsign Music, Anthony Maniscalco, and Steven Lee.

Inspired to make upbeat music for the summer season, Feel focuses on electronic dance and electro house music. It is also her second musical effort to predominantly include the English language, and lyrically explores themes of love, pleasure, and empowerment. Upon release, Feel received mixed-to-positive reviews from music critics. Most reviews praised the album's sound and Amuro's incorporation of electronic dance music. However, some criticised the album's lack of originality and Amuro's English delivery.

The album was a commercial success in Japan, reaching number one on both the Oricon Albums Chart and the Billboard Hot Albums chart. It was also certified platinum by the Recording Industry Association of Japan (RIAJ) and sold over 400,000 units in Japan. It also appeared on the record charts in South Korea and Taiwan. Amuro embarked on her Feel Tour 2013, travelling throughout Japan and other parts of Asia. The following year, a live DVD and Blu-Ray were released.

Five singles were released to promote Feel: "Big Boys Cry", "Beautiful", "Contrail", "Hands on Me", and "Heaven"; although "Beautiful" did not appear on the album. The first two songs were released as a double A-side single and underperformed in Amuro's home country. "Contrail," "Hands on Me," and "Heaven" were digitally released and charted on the Billboard Japan Hot 100. Each song was also featured in commercials that debuted in Japan.

== Background and production ==
In June 2012, Namie Amuro released her first bilingual studio album, Uncontrolled, to commemorate her 20th career anniversary. It marked a shift in Amuro's sound and production standards, primarily working with songwriters and producers outside of Japan, and it also marked Amuro's transition from urban to electronic dance music. The album received mixed-to-positive reviews upon its release, but it was a commercial success in her home country. Amuro embarked on her 5 Domes Tour throughout Japan to promote the album, which later received a live DVD and Blu-Ray release.

Throughout 2012, publications in Japan reported that Amuro had intended to part ways with her label Avex Trax and management company Vision Factory after a 17-year partnership. However, Avex decided to create Dimension Point, a label for Amuro to release her future music. Furthermore, the establishment of the label allowed Amuro to take control of her music and professional ventures on future releases.

Amuro confirmed work on a new album in January 2013. The recording sessions were held at Avex Studios, Prime Sound Studios and LAB Recordings in Tokyo, Japan, with the final material mixed by D.O.I. at Daiminion Recordings, and mastered by Chris Gehringer at Sterling Sound Studios in New York City. In an interview with ViVi magazine, she described the overall appeal as "very summery," despite the fact that she had only recorded half of the album at the time. Furthermore, Amuro later addressed the album's overall appeal, saying, “I don't know how people will view it, but I don't want them to think too hard about it. Everyone has their own interpretations of music. I want the album to be one they turn on over and over to improve their mood."

== Sound and content ==
"There are so many different kinds of music all around the world, so I thought about what gave me good vibes, gradually listening and choosing “music” that fit the mood, situation, etc. at the time. I think music is something that can communicate those things even without words there to explain. I hope everyone can take something different away from this album.”

—Amuro discussing her musical exploration of Feel.

Musically, Feel is predominately inspired by electronic dance music and electro house. Prior to its release, Amuro said the album would "convey the energy and feeling of summer," later confirming that it would feature various dance numbers. Furthermore, she re-iterated her sentiments with Mina magazine, saying, "The album is very summery and high energy, and you can just enjoy it without having to think too much." Billboard Japan noted the diversity of the album's sound, citing "aggressive tracks and simple ballads". Japanese magazine CD Journal echoed similar opinions, but noted the record being influenced by electronic dance music and electro house. Writing for The Japan Times, contributor Patrick St. Michel noted the albums influenced on Westernized production standards, citing electronic dance music and electropop as major musical notes. Additionally, he compared the sound to Japanese musicians Kumi Koda and Ayumi Hamasaki, whom, according to St. Michel, also experimented with this sound previously.

Feel opens with the track "Alive", an electronic dance number that includes a bass drop during its chorus and instrumentation of heavy basslines and electric guitar riffs. The songs producer, Anthony Maniscalco, sampled the composition and placed it into his own song titled "Magnet", under his stage name Hook n Sling. The second song "Rainbow" is also inspired by electro house music, and was compared to the song "I Love It" by Swedish musical act Icona Pop. "Can You Feel This Love?" is the third track on the album, and was produced by Ryuichiro Yamaki, a collaborator whom Amuro had previously worked with during her time with Japanese group Suite Chic. "Big Boys Cry", the fourth song on the album, is a rhythmic-sounding number that was produced by Swedish music team Dsign Music. The fifth track on the album is "Hands on Me", an club-oriented electro house number with elements of complextro sounds and heavy drum beats. Produced by German-Russian producer Zedd, the albums sixth track "Heaven" is another electro house-driven song that lyrically touches on themes of love.

"Poison" is the seventh track on Feel, and is a club-inspired number that was described as "sexy" and "dangerous". "La La La", the albums eighth track, is a confident electro house track. The albums ninth track, "Supernatural Love", is inspired by both electropop and dancehall sounds, alongside elements of K-pop and Korean contemporary dance music. "Let Me Let You Go" is the only ballad that appears on the record, and is a simple-piano driven song that showcases Amuro's vocal deliveries. "Contrail", the eleventh song that appears on the album, is mid-tempo dance number that includes instrumentation of synthesizers, keyboards and a drum machine. The album closes with the song "Stardust in My Eyes", which features various string arrangements over an electro house and drum and bass composition.

== Release and formats ==
"This album requires the use of your senses to enjoy, so the design covering various parts of the face ties into that. The ways people obtained information in the past was very limited, but we currently live in an era of information overload. In such an age, it becomes especially important to decide what is right for yourself. So I hope people can be truly free to choose the way they want to enjoy music."

—Amuro talking about the photoshoot for Feel.

Feel was released on July 10, 2013. It is her eleventh musical effort, and her second studio album to incorporate the English language. Additionally, it is Amuro's first release with Dimension Point, a sub-division of her label Avex Trax, and her final record working with her management company Rising Production (formerly Vision Factory). The album features 12 tracks totaling more than 42 minutes in length. Two other formats, the DVD and Blu-Ray version, included seven music videos; "Alive", "Big Boys Cry", "Hands on Me", "Heaven", "Let Me Let You Go", "Contrail", and an unreleased English version of the album track "Can You Feel This Love?".

All three versions of Feel were released on various physical formats. First-pressings of the album were distributed as a digipack, which included the album booklet and details exclusive to Amuro's fanclub. Retail outlets in Japan issued either a large poster or stickers to the first-press editions of the album, whilst a T-shirt with the album art was released through Amuro's fanclub. After the roll-out of the first-pressings, the album was distributed with a jewelcase packaging. The album artwork and photoshoot was photographed by Takaki Kumada, which featured black and white close-up shots of Amuro's face, while the art direction and the album's booklet was designed by Masaru Yoshikawa from AEI. All three cover arts of the album are loosely inspired by the depiction of the three wise monkeys; it shows Amuro covering her ears, eyes, and mouth.

After Amuro's retirement from the entertainment industry, Dimension Point published all of her music on streaming services and various digital outlets in mid-2019, including Feel. However, in November 2023, Feel, alongside the rest of Amuro's music releases, were removed from physical retailers, digital outlets, and streaming services due to unexplained reasons.

== Promotion ==
=== Singles and other songs ===
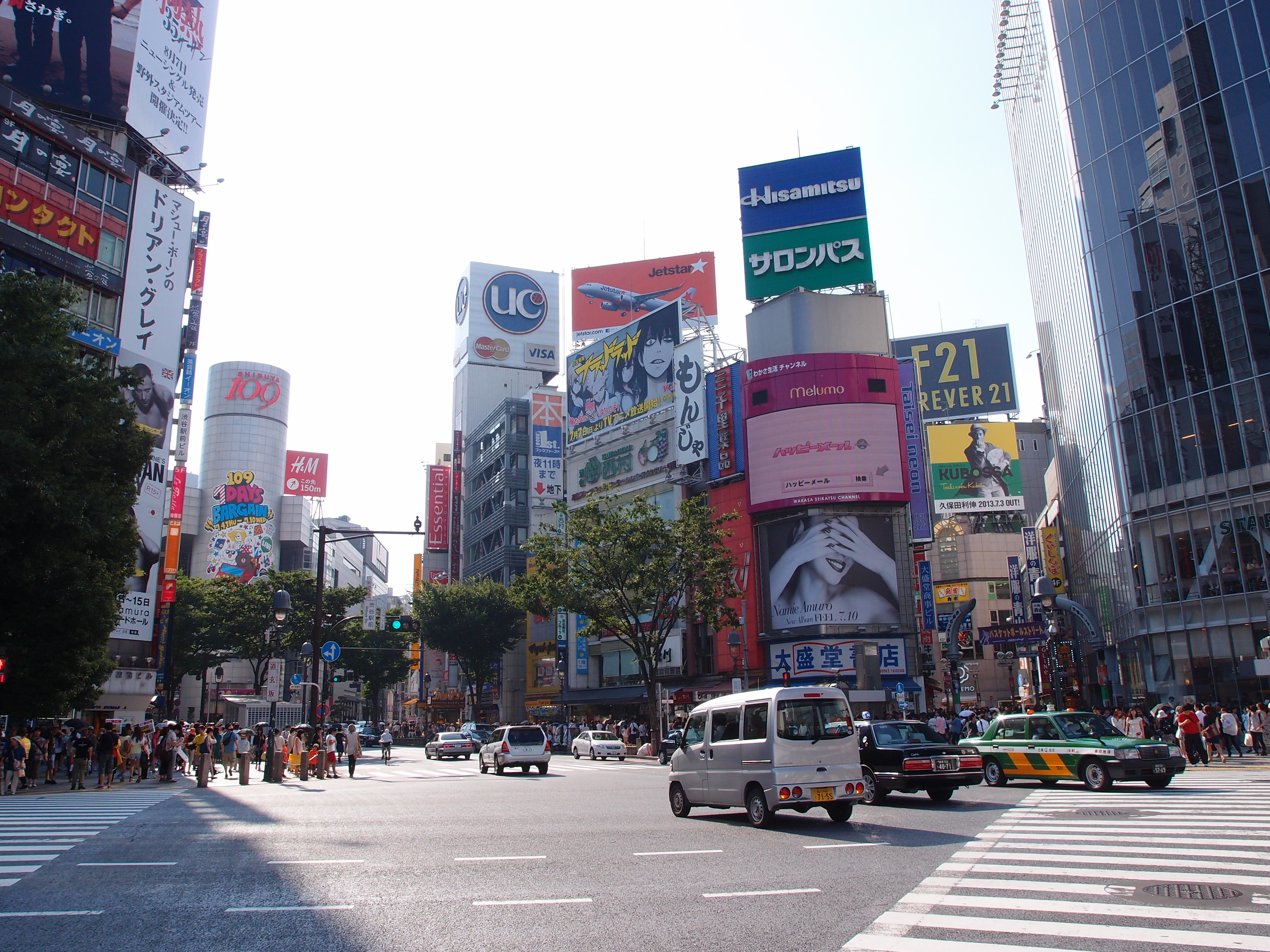
Feel being promoted at Shibuya Crossing.

Five singles were released to promote Feel. "Big Boys Cry" and "Beautiful" were released the album's lead singles on March 6, 2013, through Dimension Point, both distributed as a double A-side format. Despite its commercial release, "Beautiful" did not appear on the track list for Feel. The songs underperformed in Amuro's native Japan, reaching number four on the Oricon Singles Chart, and ultimately became Amuro's lowest-selling physical single in her career. A music video for each song appeared on the DVD formats of the single. The albums second single, "Contrail", was released on May 19, 2013, through Dimension Point. It was distributed through digital outlets, making it ineligible to chart on Oricon in Japan. However, it did peak at number eight on Japan Hot 100 chart, and was certified platinum by the Recording Industry Association of Japan (RIAJ) for digital sales of 250,000 units.

"Hands on Me" was released as the albums fourth single by Dimension Point through digital outlets on July 3, 2013. Commercially, the song peaked at number 19 on the Japan Hot 100 chart. An accompanying visual was shot in Los Angeles, California, featuring the singer on a rooftop dancing to the song, and attending a pool party; cameo appearances of American girl group TLC were featured. Seven days later, on July 10, the same day as the release of Feel, album track "Heaven" was released as the albums fifth and final digital single, distributed by Dimension Point. The song peaked at number 26 on the Japan Hot 100 chart. A music video featured Amuro in a neon-lit rooms, surrounding by party aesthetics and back-up dancers. Although not released as a single, "La La La" charted at number 53 on the Japan Hot 100 chart.

Several songs included on the album were included in various commercials and advertisements promoted in Japan. "Big Boys Cry", "Beautiful", and "La La La" were used as commercial tracks for the skincare brand Kose Esprique; a visual commercial was filmed and included Amuro. "Contrail" was used as the theme track to the 2013 television series Flying Public Relations Office, which was broadcast by Japanese network Tokyo Broadcasting System (TBS). "Can You Feel This Love?" was used as the theme song to celebrate the 20th anniversary of the Fuji Television series Mezamashi TV. Tracks and promotional footage of the album were used in MTV's "Artist of the Month" segment in July 2013.

=== Feel Tour 2013 ===
Namie Amuro Feel Tour 2013
- Tour by Namie Amuro
- Official DVD and promotional artwork.
- Location: Japan
- Associated album: Feel
- Start date: August 16, 2013
- End date: December 23, 2013
- Legs: 1
- No. of shows: 45

Namie Amuro concert chronology
- 5 Major Domes Tour: 20th Anniversary (2012); Namie Amuro Feel Tour 2013 (2013); Live Style 2014 (2014)

Amuro announced her Feel tour in early mid 2013. The dates were confirmed via a flyer given out with the purchases of Feel, enclosed in the album's booklet. A total of 44 shows in over 20 different cities were scheduled in Japan, spanning from August 16 at the Yokosuka Arts Theatre, Kanagawa Prefecture, and finishing on December 23 at the Fukuoka Convention Center in Fukuoka. A special website was hosted by Avex Trax during the concert tour, showing a live report and special photos from specific concert dates. An Asian leg was originally added to the concert tour, having Amuro travel to Singapore for a live show with promotion handled by Midas Promotions; this would have been the singer's second visit to the country. However, in April 2013, a tour promoter cancelled the show and cited "local promoter issues". However, Midas Promotions uploaded a press release, believing poor ticket sales and expensive rates to be the primary issue.

A live album and DVD/Blu-Ray were recorded at the Saitama Super Arena on December 1. A total of 28 songs were added on the track list, including a bonus track of "Contrail", which was recorded at the National Yoyogi Stadium First Gymnasium to commemorate her 500th live performance. Titled Namie Amuro Feel Tour 2003, the formats were a success in Japan; it reached the top spot on the Oricon DVD chart, and number two on the Blu-Ray Chart, and was certified gold by the Recording Industry Association of Japan (RIAJ) for shipments of 100,000 copies.

=== Set list ===
2013 show set-list
1. Video Introduction
2. "Alive"
3. "Hands on Me"
4. "Sit! Stay! Wait! Down!"
5. "Hot Girls"
6. "Yeah-Oh!"
7. "Poison"
8. "Ballerina"
9. "Rainbow"
10. "Go Round"
11. Video Interlude
12. "Make It Happen!"
13. "La La La"
14. "Let Me Let You Go"
15. Video Interlude
16. "Wonder Woman"
17. "Damage"
18. "In The Spotlight (Tokyo)"
19. Video Interlude
20. "Only You"
21. "Love Story"
22. "Supernatural Love"
23. "Big Boys Cry"
24. "Stardust in My Eyes"
25. Video Interlude
26. "Unusual"
27. "Neonlight Lipstick"
28. "Let's Go"
29. "Heaven"
30. "Fight Together"
31. "Can You Feel This Love"
32. "Contrail"
Namie Amuro Feel Tour 2013 DVD track list
1. "Alive"
2. "Hands on Me"
3. "Sit! Stay! Wait! Down!"
4. "Hot Girls"
5. "Yeah-Oh!"
6. "Poison"
7. "Ballerina"
8. "Rainbow"
9. "Go Round"
10. "Make It Happen!"
11. "La La La"
12. "Let Me Let You Go"
13. "Wonder Woman"
14. "Damage"
15. "In The Spotlight (Tokyo)"
16. "Only You"
17. "Love Story"
18. "Supernatural Love"
19. "Big Boys Cry"
20. "Stardust in My Eyes"
21. "Unusual"
22. "Neonlight Lipstick"
23. "Let's Go"
24. "Heaven"
25. "Fight Together"
26. "Can You Feel This Love"
27. "Contrail"
28. "Contrail" (Live at Yoyogi Stadium for her 500th live performance celebration)

=== Shows ===
Date	City	Venue	Attendance
August 16, 2013	Kanagawa	Yokosuka Arts Theater	240,000
August 19, 2013	Kobe	Kobe Kokusai Hall	240,000
August 20, 2013	Kobe	Kobe Kokusai Hall	240,000
August 24, 2013	Miyagi	Sendai Sun Plaza	240,000
August 25, 2013	Miyagi	Sendai Sun Plaza	240,000
August 28, 2013	Aomori	Aomori City Cultural Center	240,000
August 29, 2013	Iwate	Iwate Prefectural Civic Center Great Hall	240,000
September 1, 2013	Shiga	Biwako Hall Centre	240,000
September 2, 2013	Okayama	Kurashiki City Hall	240,000
September 5, 2013	Kanazawa	Honda no Mori Hall	240,000
September 6, 2013	Toyama	Toyama Shimin Plaza	240,000
September 9, 2013	Hiroshima	Bunka Gakuen HBG Hall	240,000
September 9, 2013	Hiroshima	Bunka Gakuen HBG Hall	240,000
September 10, 2013	Hiroshima	Bunka Gakuen HBG Hall	240,000
September 12, 2013	Tottori	Yonago Convention Centre	240,000
September 17, 2013	Kagawa	Kenmin Hall	240,000
September 18, 2013	Ehime	Himekin Hall	240,000
September 22, 2013	Oita	Oita Prefectural General Culture Center	240,000
September 23, 2013	Oita	Oita Prefectural General Culture Center	240,000
September 26, 2013	Miyazaki	Miyazaki City Hall	240,000
September 26, 2013	Kagoshima	Kagoshima Citizens' Cultural Hall	240,000
October 1, 2013	Niigata	Niigata Prefectural Civic Center	240,000
October 2, 2013	Niigata	Niigata Prefectural Civic Center	240,000
October 19, 2013	Chiba	Makuhari Messe Event Hall	240,000
October 20, 2013	Chiba	Makuhari Messe Event Hall	240,000
November 2, 2013	Hokkaido	Hokkaido Prefectural Sports Center	240,000
November 3, 2013	Hokkaido	Hokkaido Prefectural Sports Center	240,000
November 7, 2013	Osaka	Osaka-jō Hall	240,000
November 8, 2013	Osaka	Osaka-jō Hall	240,000
November 10, 2013	Osaka	Osaka-jō Hall	240,000
November 19, 2013	Aichi	Nippon Gaishi Hall	240,000
November 20, 2013	Aichi	Nippon Gaishi Hall	240,000
November 22, 2013	Aichi	Nippon Gaishi Hall	240,000
November 26, 2013	Tokyo	Yoyogi National Gymnasium	240,000
November 27, 2013	Tokyo	Yoyogi National Gymnasium	240,000
November 30, 2013	Saitama	Saitama Super Arena	240,000
December 1, 2013	Saitama	Saitama Super Arena	240,000
December 7, 2013	Tokyo	Yoyogi National Gymnasium	240,000
December 8, 2013	Tokyo	Yoyogi National Gymnasium	240,000
December 10, 2013	Tokyo	Yoyogi National Gymnasium	240,000
December 14, 2013	Osaka	Osaka-jō Hall	240,000
December 15, 2013	Osaka	Osaka-jō Hall	240,000
December 21, 2013	Fukuoka	Fukuoka Convention Center	240,000
December 22, 2013	Fukuoka	Fukuoka Convention Center	240,000
December 23, 2013	Fukuoka	Fukuoka Convention Center	240,000

== Reception ==
Professional ratings
Review scores
Source	Rating
Billboard Japan	(neutral)
CDJournal	(neutral)
The Japan Times	(mixed)

Feel received mixed-to-positive reviews from music critics. A review from Billboard Japan noted the albums diverse set of genres and sounds, describing the record as "cutting-edge." Similarly, a review from CDJournal also complimented the albums set of sounds. Although the review was ambivalent towards a few "simple songs" on the record, Feel was praised for its "ambitious" production and for Amuro's vocal deliveires. Blerds Online held a ranking of all of Amuro's studio albums, and listed Feel at number five, highlighting its "cohesive sound" and labelled it as "unique". The review highlighted "Rainbow", "La La La", and "Stardust In My Eyes" as the album standouts.

Contributing for The Japan Times, Patrick St. Michel wrote a mixed review. He opined that Feel was a "calculated stab at Western sensibilities", noting the overwhelming use of the English language and collaborations with producers outside of Japan as factors. Although he highlighted "Alive", "Rainbow", "Big Boys Cry" and "La La La" as standouts, he felt the production standards lacked "ambition". Overall, he summarised the album by saying, "Had Amuro and her team focused on perfecting this sound, Feel would match up to any Western electro-pop album from 2013. Unfortunately it doesn't, and the inconsistency makes for a frustrating listen."

Commercially, Feel was a success. In Japan, Feel debuted at the top of the daily and weekly Oricon Albums Chart, opening with sales of 247,689 copies in its first-six days. It became Amuro's eleventh album to top both charts on Oricon, and also became the highest first-week sales for a solo female artist that year, beating Nanda Collection (2013) by Kyary Pamyu Pamyu. Feel spent six weeks inside the top ten on the weekly chart, and lasted 45 weeks in total. By the end of 2013, the album was the sixth-best selling record in the country, having sold 382,684 copies. Additionally, Amuro became the highest-selling solo artist in terms of pure album sales that year. Moreover, the album opened at number one on the Billboard Japan Hot Album Sales chart. Feel was certified platinum by the Recording Industry Association of Japan (RIAJ) for shipments of 250,000 units.

Elsewhere, Feel charted in other territories in Asia. In South Korean, the album debuted and peaked number 25 on the South Korean Gaon Albums Chart, her highest entry in the region, and also appeared on the Overseas chart at number five. In Taiwan, Feel peaked at number six on the G-Music standard chart and number one on the East Asian chart for a sole week.

== Track listing ==
CD / Digital download.
No.	Title	Lyrics	Producer	Length
1.	"Alive"	Anthony Maniscalco; Erika Nuri; Marc Malouf; Shridhar Solanki	A. Maniscalco	3:27
2.	"Rainbow"	Lukas Nathanson; Scott Effman; Lauren Dyson; Tiger	Ambience	3:03
3.	"Can You Feel This Love"	CH; Erina	R. Yamaki
4.	"Big Boys Cry"	Kanata Okajima; Nermin Harambasic; Anne Judith Wik; Ronny Svendsen; Hayley Aitken; Eirik Johansen; Jan Hallvard Larsen	Okajima; Harambasic; Wik; Svendsen; Aitken; Johansen; Larsen	3:22
5.	"Hands on Me"	Anesha Birchett; Antea Shelton; Fredrik "Fredro" Odesjo; Adam Kapit	Fredro; A. Kapit	3:15
6.	"Heaven"	Emyli	Zedd	3:31
7.	"Poison"	Tiger; N. Tranquillo	A. Kapit	3:51
8.	"La La La"	David Dawood; Natalia Hajjrar; Ana Diaz	DaWood	2:59
9.	"Supernatural Love"	Steven Lee; Rike Boomgaarden	S. Lee	3:23
10.	"Let Me Let You Go"	Shelly Peiken; JD Walker	JD Walker	4:02
11.	"Contrail"	Nao'ymt	Nao'ymt	4:12
12.	"Stardust in My Eyes"	Daniel Traynor; Karen Poole; Carmen Reece	HyGrade	3:25
Total length:				42:29

DVD and Blu-ray (Music Videos)
No.	Title	Director(s)	Length
1.	"Alive"	IKIOI
2.	"Big Boys Cry"	Daisuke "Nino" Ninomiya (IKIOI)
3.	"Contrail"	Daisuke "Nino" Ninomiya (IKIOI)
4.	"Hands on Me"	Daisuke "Nino" Ninomiya (IKIOI)
5.	"Heaven"	Daisuke "Nino" Ninomiya (IKIOI)
6.	"Let Me Let You Go"	Daisuke "Nino" Ninomiya (IKIOI)
7.	"Can You Feel This Love (English ver.) -Making Movie-"	IKIOI

== Personnel ==
Personnel details were sourced from Feel's liner notes booklet.

Visuals and imagery

- Noriko Goto – stylist
- Takaki Kumada – photography
- Eichi Matsunaga – nails
- Akemi Nakano – hair, make-up
- Masaru Yoshikawa – art direction, design

Performers and musicians

- Hayley Aitken – background vocals
- Namie Amuro – vocals
- DaWood – instruments
- Ana Diaz – additional background vocals
- Emyli – background vocals
- Fredro – instruments
- Natalia Hajjara – additional background vocals
- HyGrade – instruments
- Adam Kapit – instruments
- Nao'ymt – instruments
- Keiichi Takahashi – guitar
- Nicole Tranquillo – background vocals
- Anne Judith Wik – background vocals

Technical and production

- Ambience – production
- DaWood – production
- DOI – mixing
- DSign Music – production
- Emyli – vocal direction
- Cobra Endo – production coordination
- Fredro – production
- FZ from SFPR – additional programming
- Chris Gehringer – mastering
- Kohei Hatakeyama – mixing
- High Speed Boyz – production coordination
- HyGrade – production, programming
- Susumu Isa – vocal direction
- Hiseaki Jinbu – mixing
- Adam Kapit – production, vocal production
- Steven Lee – production, mixing
- Anthony Maniscalo (Kobalt Music/Golden Sunset Music) – production
- Nao'ymt – production, vocal direction
- Kenji Sano – vocal direction
- Nicole Tranquillo – vocal production
- JD Walker – production
- Ryuichiro Yamaki – production
- Zedd – production

== Charts ==
=== Weekly charts ===
Chart (2013–2014)	Peak position
Japanese Albums (Oricon)	1
Japanese Top Albums (Billboard)	1
South Korean Albums (Gaon)	25
South Korean Overseas Albums (Gaon)	5
Taiwanese Albums (G-Music)	6
Taiwanese East Asian Albums (G-Music)	1

=== Monthly charts ===
Chart (2013)	Peak position
Japanese Albums (Oricon)	1

=== Year-end charts ===
Chart (2013)	Position
Japanese Albums (Oricon)	6

== Certification and sales ==
Region	Certification	Certified units/sales
Japan (RIAJ)	Platinum	382,684

== Release history ==
Region	Date	Format	Label
Japan	July 10, 2013	CD; DVD; Blu-ray; digital download; streaming	Dimension Point
Worldwide	July 10, 2013	Digital download	Avex Trax
Taiwan	July 19, 2013	CD; DVD	Avex Taiwan
Indonesia	July 19, 2013	CD	Avex Indonesia
South Korea	July 24, 2013	CD	Genie Music

== See also ==
- List of Oricon number-one albums of 2013
