= Bristeil =

Belarusian indie rock band

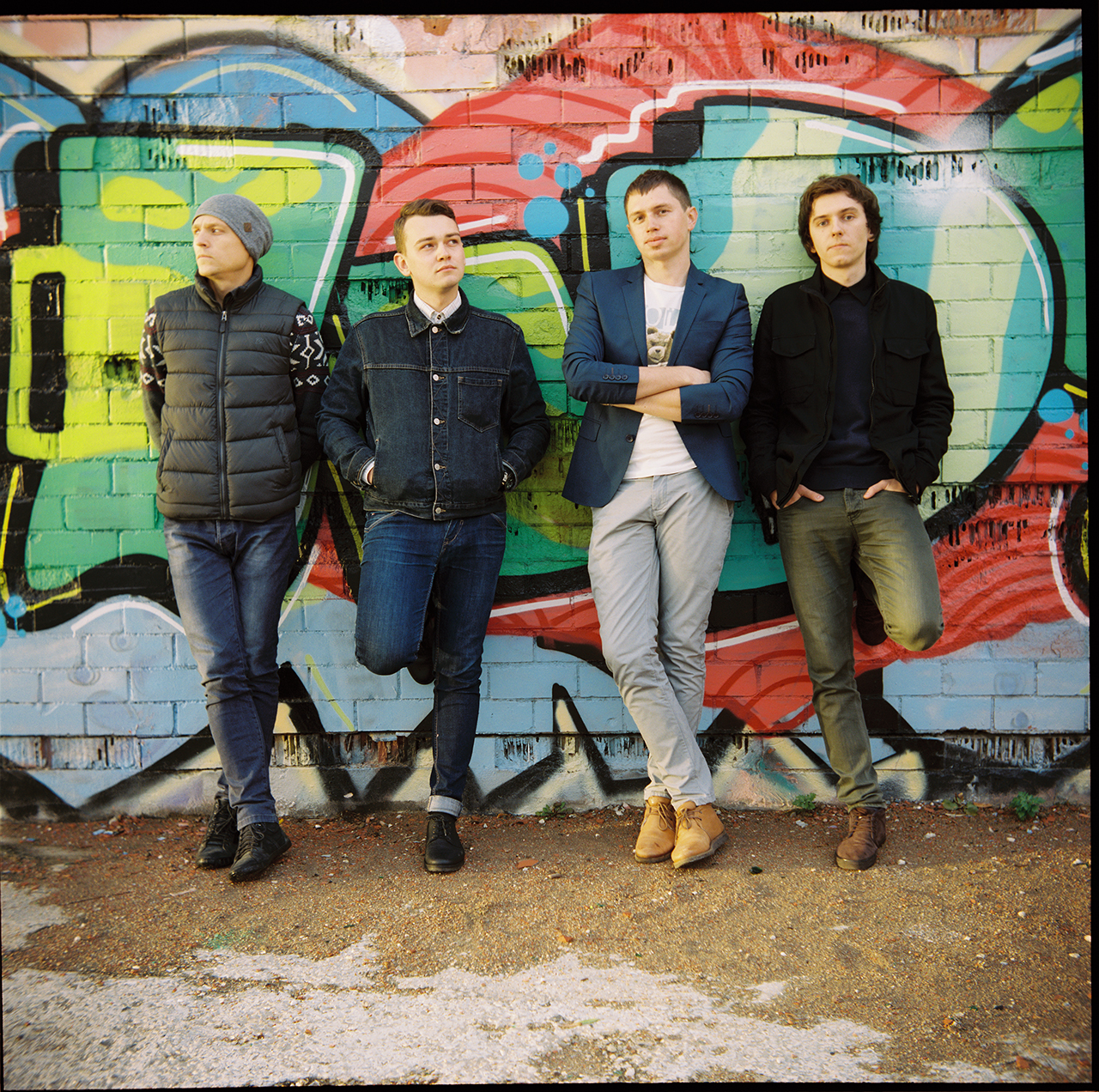
- Bristeil in 2014, from left to right: Aleh Vial; Alex "Stepkinz" Stepanovich; Max Bykau; Gena "Drop D" Lukashanets

Background information
- Origin: Minsk, Belarus
- Genres: intelligent rock, pop rock
- Years active: 2013–present
- Members: Aleh Vial; Max Bykau; Gena "Drop D" Lukashanets; Alex "Stepkinz" Stepanovich
- Website: bristeil.com

Bristeil are an indie rock music band from Minsk, Belarus. Their music is often referred to as "intelligent rock". The group was formed in 2013 by lead vocalist and guitarist Aleh Vial. They released the debut EP Cyruĺnia Svietu ("The Barbershop of the World") on 26 May 2014. At present, Vial mostly focuses on songwriting for his solo electronic music project Helaiv, launched in 2017, while guitarist Max Bykau in fall 2018 began to play in the acoustic pop duo Maks & Lera, while playing part-time in the cover band Miami.

== History ==
Bristeil was formed out of Aleh Vial's former bandm Hair Peace Salon. Hair Peace Salon made the semi-finals in the 2007 Global Battle of the Bands contest and participated in many other music festivals. Over a ten-year period they produced indie pop songs in English. Hair Peace Salon released one full-length album, Gentleman, in 2012 as well as singles and EPs.

In 2013, Vial decided to embark on a new venture with drummer Alex Stepanovich, so they founded Bristeil.

At the end of 2013, two other members joined Bristeil: bass player Gena Lukashanets and lead guitarist Max Bykau. On 2 December 2013, the band released their first single "Heta Mahčyma" ("It's Possible") on SoundCloud. Their debut EP Cyruĺnia Svietu was released on 26 May 2014. It has four tracks, two of which were covers: one was a Belarusian rock version of Lana Del Rey's "Video Games", and one was Hair Peace Salon's song "Out of Time" from the album Gentleman, performed in Belarusian as "Pa-za Časam". The release was received well by music critics, with Tuzin.fm saying, "There is depth in the lyrics and the delicacy of the feed, each of the four tracks deserve equal airplay." After the EP, the band worked on a full-length album.

On 21 September 2014, Bristeil released their first video single for their new song "Muzyka Hučyć" ("Music Sounds"). In early October this video was re-released into the main version. Bristeil made this music video based on the live recording session footage of the composition "Unfinished Song". The song was originally written by Vial as his winning entry in a contest where the prize was to perform the song with the musician Tricky.

In 2014, the band were nominated for the "Debut of the Year" from the biggest Belarusian music portal, Tuzin.fm. The "Heroes of the Year" awards show was held on 12 December 2014, and Bristeil had been announced in the line-up and planned to perform there, but at the very last moment Lukashanets injured his hand and the band was unable to perform. The band apologised for not being able to perform.

By the fall of 2014, the band's songwriting was split into two new side projects: Helaiv and Maks&Lera. In early 2015 Bristeil opened their official website, but the last piece of music by the band was released on 9 September 2015, in the form of a short Vine clip.

Oleg Klimov, a correspondent for the newspaper Kultura, said that the band "dissolved prematurely".

== Name change ==
After releasing their first music video, the band changed their name from Bristol to "Bristeil" to make it easier to find them on the web.

== Social activity ==
In April 2015 the band became an ambassador of The Will Gray Blueprint foundation.

== Band members ==
- Aleh Vial – lead vocals, guitar (2013–).
- Max Bykau – lead guitar, backing vocals (2013–).
- Gena "Drop D" Lukashanets – bass (2013–).
- Alex "Stepkinz" Stepanovich – drums (2013–).

Timeline

== Discography ==
=== EPs ===
- Cyruĺnia Svietu (2014)

=== Singles ===
Year	Title
2013	"Heta Mahčyma"
2014	"Muzyka Hučyć"

=== Music videos ===
Year	Title
2014	"Muzyka Hučyć"

== Awards and nominations ==
=== The Heroes of the Year Awards (presented by Tuzin.fm) ===
Year	Nominee / work	Award	Result
2014	Bristeil	Debut of the Year	Nominated
