= Big Boys Cry/Beautiful =

"Big Boys Cry" / "Beautiful"

Single by Namie Amuro

from the album FEEL
- Released: March 26, 2013
- Genre: Experimental pop; ballad
- Length: 3:25 ("Big Boys Cry"); 3:56 ("Beautiful")
- Label: Avex Trax
- Songwriters: Kanata Okajima, Nermin Harambašić, Anne Judith Wik, Ronny Svendsen, Hayley Aitken, Eirik Johansen, Jan Hallvard Larsen
- Producers: Nermin Harambašić, Anne Judith Wik, Ronny Svendsen, Hayley Aitken, Eirik Johansen, Jan Hallvard Larsen, Michael Szumowski, Katrina Noorbergen, Dimitri Ehlich

Namie Amuro singles chronology
"Go Round / YEAH-OH" (2012)	"Big Boys Cry" / "Beautiful" (2013)	"Contrail" (2013)

"Big Boys Cry"/"Beautiful" is the 38th maxi single released by Japanese recording artist Namie Amuro. It was released on March 6, 2013 and was her last single released under the label Avex Trax. The single peaked at #4 on Oricon, it’s her lead single for her eleventh studio album Feel.

Both songs were used by Kosé to promote their make-up line: Esprique.

Big Boys Cry was first heard in a commercial promoting Kosé's make up line: Kosé Esprique on February 23, 2013. The song was then made its debut at the Tokyo Girls Collection 2013 Spring/Summer Fashion Show where Namie Amuro performed the song live as a surprise guest. Finally, its promotional music video was released on March 5, 2013.

Beautiful was first featured in a Christmas themed commercial in November 2012. Although commercials for the single showed footage of a music video for Beautiful, one was never released.

== Track listing ==
CD
No.	Title	Lyrics	Music	Arranger(s)	Length
1.	"Big Boys Cry"	Kanata Okajima, Nermin Harambašić, Anne Judith Wik, Ronny Svendsen, Hayley Aitken, Eirik Johansen, Jan Hallvard Larsen	Nermin Harambašić, Anne Judith Wik, Ronny Svendsen, Hayley Aitken, Eirik Johansen, Jan Hallvard Larsen	Dsign Music	3:25
2.	"Beautiful"	Tiger, Michael Szumowski, Katrina Noorbergen, Dimitri Ehlich	Michael Szumowski, Katrina Noorbergen, Dimitri Ehlich		03:56
4.	"Big Boys Cry" (Extended instrumental)
5.	"Beautiful" (Instrumental)

DVD: Music videos
No.	Title	Length
1.	"Big Boys Cry"	03:25
2.	"Beautiful" (Music video)

== Charts ==
Chart (2013)	Peak position
Japanese Singles Chart	2
