= 2013 in classical music =

== Events ==
- January 10 – Richard Dare resigns as president of the New Jersey Symphony Orchestra, following reports of a prior accusation of a sexual offense in 1996 and of exaggerations of his business accomplishments.
- January 16 – The Houston Symphony Orchestra announces the appointment of Andrés Orozco-Estrada as its next music director, effective with the 2014–2015 season, with an initial contract of 5 years.
- February 18 – The Bergen Philharmonic Orchestra announces the appointment of Edward Gardner as its next principal conductor, effective with the 2015–2016 season.
- March 18 – The Helsingborg Symphony Orchestra announces the appointment of Stefan Solyom as its next chief conductor, as of the 2014–2015 season.
- April 25 – Santa Fe Opera announces the appointment of Harry Bicket as its next chief conductor, effective 1 October 2013.
- May 19 – James Levine conducts his first concert after an absence of two years, with the Metropolitan Opera Orchestra at Carnegie Hall.
- June 22 – American mezzo-soprano Jamie Barton wins the "Song Prize" at the BBC Cardiff Singer of the World competition.
- July 1 – Jaime Martín formally becomes principal conductor of the Gävle Symphony Orchestra.
- August 20 – The Colorado Symphony Orchestra elevates Andrew Litton from its music advisor to Music Director, with immediate effect.
- September 7 – American orchestral conductor Marin Alsop becomes the first woman to conduct the Last Night of The Proms at the Royal Albert Hall in London.
- November 29 – The Vancouver Symphony Orchestra announces that Bramwell Tovey is to conclude his tenure as VSO music director after the 2017–2018 season.
- December 10 – La Scala announced the appointment of Riccardo Chailly as its next music director, effective 1 January 2017 through 31 December 2022.

== New works ==
The following composers' works were composed, premiered, or published this year, as noted in the citation.

=== A ===
- Hans Abrahamsen – Let Me Tell You, for soprano and orchestra
- Mark Adamo – Aristotle
- John Adams – Saxophone Concerto
- Thomas Ades – Totentanz

=== B ===
- Matej Bonin – Mouvements

=== C ===
- Benet Casablancas
  - Tres Interludios, for orchestra
  - Obertura Festiva, for orchestra

=== D ===
- Bryce Dessner – Murder Ballads

=== E ===
- Brian Elias – Once Did I Breathe Another's Breath

=== F ===
- Lorenzo Ferrero – Venice 1976 (A Parody), for flute, clarinet, violin, violoncello, and piano
- Francesco Filidei
  - Ballata No. 3, for piano and ensemble
  - Due Trascrizioni da Merula e Trabaci, for string quartet
  - Poemetto, for ensemble
  - Silence = Death (Democracy), for 4 percussionists
- Graham Fitkin – Panufnik Variations
- Cheryl Frances-Hoad – Katharsis
- Gabriela Lena Frank – Karnavalito No. 1

=== G ===
- Philip Glass
  - String Quartet No. 6
  - Two Movements for Four Pianos
- Edward Gregson – Aztec Dances (concerto for flute and ensemble) (2010)
- Pelle Gudmundsen-Holmgreen – Together or Not

=== H ===
- David Philip Hefti – Éclairs

=== K ===
- Wojciech Kilar – A prayer to St. Therese the Little Flower, for mixed choir a cappella

=== M ===
- Missy Mazzoli – Heartbreaker

=== R ===
- Steve Reich – Radio Rewrite
- Christopher Rouse
  - Symphony No. 4
  - Thunderstuck
- Poul Ruders
  - String Quartet No. 4 (2012)
  - Schrödinger's Cat (2012)

=== S ===
- Aulis Sallinen – Five Portraits of Women, Op. 100

=== T ===
- Mark-Anthony Turnage – Speranza

=== V ===
- Ian Venables – The Song of The Severn, Op. 43
- Param Vir – Cave of Luminous Mind

=== W ===
- Judith Weir – Blue-Green Hill (2013)

== Opera ==
- Gerald Barry – The Importance of Being Earnest: premiere staged performance, 17 March 2013, Opéra national de Lorraine, Nancy
- Terence Blanchard – Champion
- Raymond Deane – The Alma Fetish (2012), concert performance, Dublin, National Concert Hall, 17 September 2013
- Ivan Fischer – The Red Heifer
- Philip Glass – The Perfect American
- André Tchaikowsky – premiere of The Merchant of Venice at the Bregenz Festival, 18 July (opera written 1968–82)
- Šimon Voseček – Biedermann und die Brandstifter

== Albums ==
- Plácido Domingo – Verdi
- Ludovico Einaudi – In a Time Lapse
- Howard Goodall – Inspired
- Tine Thing Helseth – Tine

== Musical films ==
- A Late Quartet

== Deaths ==
- January 10 – Franz Lehrndorfer, German organist and composer, 84
- February 3 – Oscar Feltsman, Russian composer, 91
- February 8 – James DePreist, US conductor, 76
- February 15 – Antonín Kohout, Czech cellist, member of the Smetana Quartet, 93
- February 22 – Wolfgang Sawallisch, German conductor and pianist, 89
- February 27 – Van Cliburn, US pianist, 78
- February 28
  - William Bennett, American oboist (San Francisco Symphony), 56 (cerebral hemorrhage)
  - Armando Trovajoli, Italian film composer and pianist, 95
- March 1 – Rafael Puyana, Colombian harpsichordist, 81
- March 9 – Tengiz Amirejibi, Georgian pianist. 89
- March 21 – Jean-Michel Damase, French composer, pianist, and teacher, 85
- April 4 – Tommy Tycho, Hungarian-born Australian composer, arranger and orchestra conductor, 84
- April 10 – Thomas Hemsley, English opera singer, 85
- April 13 – Stephen Dodgson, composer, 89
- April 14 – Sir Colin Davis, British conductor, 85
- April 15 – Jean-François Paillard, French classical conductor, 85
- April 22 – Lalgudi Jayaraman, Indian violinist, 82
- April 25 – Jacob Avshalomov, Chinese-born American conductor and composer, 94
- May 6 – Steve Martland, British composer, 53
- May 8 – Delia Rigal, Argentine operatic soprano, 92
- May 9 – Michael Earl, British opera and ballet actor, 84
- May 15 – Albert Lance, Australian-born French opera singer, 87
- May 17 – Harold Shapero, American composer and pianist, 93
- May 20 – Anders Eliasson, Swedish composer, 66
- May 22 – Henri Dutilleux, French composer, 97
- June 1 – Paul Olefsky, US cellist (Philadelphia Orchestra, Detroit Symphony Orchestra), 87
- June 2
  - Mario Bernardi, Canadian conductor and pianist, 82
  - Keith Wilson, US classical musician, teacher and conductor, 96
- June 3 – Arnold Eidus, US violinist, 90
- June 9 – Bruno Bartoletti, Italian conductor, 86
- June 16 – Richard Marlow, English organist and choral director, 74
- June 27 – Henrik Otto Donner, Finnish composer and music industry executive, 73
- August 1
  - John Amis, British broadcaster, classical music critic and opera singer, 91
  - Toby Saks, American cellist, founder of the Seattle Chamber Music Society, 71 (pancreatic cancer)
- August 11 – Lamberto Puggelli, Italian stage and opera director, 75
- September 4 – Dick Raaymakers, Dutch composer, theater maker and theorist, 83
- September 13 – Peter Aston, English composer, 74
- September 16 – Ratiba El-Hefny, Egyptian opera singer and director of Cairo Opera House, 82
- September 25 – Hans-Joachim Rotzsch, German choral conductor, 84
- October 7 – Patrice Chéreau, French film and opera director, 68
- October 19 – Mahmoud Zoufonoun, Iranian traditional musician, 93
- October 21 – Gianni Ferrio, Italian composer, conductor and music arranger, 88
- October 29 – Rudolf Kehrer, German classical pianist, 90
- November 8 – Arnold Rosner, American composer, 68
- November 12 – Sir John Tavener, English composer of religious music, 69
- December 4 – Robert Allman, Australian operatic baritone, 86
- December 6 – Tom Krause, Finnish opera singer, 79
- December 8
  - Hung Sin-nui, Chinese Cantonese opera singer and actress, 88
  - Sándor Szokolay, Hungarian composer and professor, 82
  - Edward Williams, English composer, 92 (Life on Earth).
- December 9 – Barbara Hesse-Bukowska, 83, Polish classical pianist, 83
- December 12 – Zbigniew Karkowski, Polish composer, 55
- December 19 – Winton Dean, English musicologist, 97
- December 21 – Lars Edlund, Swedish organist and composer, 91
- December 29 – Wojciech Kilar, Polish composer, 81

== Major awards ==
=== Classical Brits ===
- International Artist of the Year – Lang Lang
- Breakthrough Artist of the Year – Amy Dickson
- Composer – Hans Zimmer
- Female Artist – Nicola Benedetti
- Male Artist – Daniel Barenboim
- Critics' Award – Jonas Kaufmann
- Album of the Year – André Rieu, Magic of the Movies

=== Grammy Awards ===
- Best Orchestral Performance: "Adams: Harmonielehre & Short Ride In A Fast Machine" – Michael Tilson Thomas, conductor (San Francisco Symphony)
- Best Opera Recording: "Wagner: Der Ring Des Nibelungen" – James Levine & Fabio Luisi, conductors; Hans-Peter König, Jay Hunter Morris, Bryn Terfel & Deborah Voigt; Jay David Saks, producer (The Metropolitan Opera Orchestra; The Metropolitan Opera Chorus)
- Best Choral Performance: "Life & Breath – Choral Works By René Clausen" – Charles Bruffy, conductor (Matthew Gladden, Lindsey Lang, Rebecca Lloyd, Sarah Tannehill & Pamela Williamson; Kansas City Chorale)
- Best Chamber Music/Small Ensemble Performance: "Meanwhile" – Eighth Blackbird
- Best Classical Instrumental Solo – "Kurtág & Ligeti: Music For Viola" – Kim Kashkashian
- Best Classical Vocal Solo: "Poèmes" – Renée Fleming (Alan Gilbert & Seiji Ozawa; Orchestre National De France & Orchestre Philharmonique De Radio France)
- Best Classical Compendium: Penderecki: Fonogrammi; Horn Concerto; Partita; The Awakening Of Jacob; Anaklasis – Antoni Wit, conductor; Aleksandra Nagórko & Andrzej Sasin, producers
- Best Classical Contemporary Composition: "Meanwhile – Incidental Music To Imaginary Puppet Plays" – Stephen Hartke, composer

=== Other national awards ===
- Spanish National Music Prize: Award for Composition: "Darkness visible – Nocturne for Orchestra after Milton/Pessoa" – Benet Casablancas, composer
