= List of Oricon number-one albums of 2013 =

The highest-selling albums and mini-albums in Japan are ranked in the Oricon Weekly Chart, published by Oricon Style magazine. The data is compiled by Oricon based on each album's weekly physical sales. In 2013, a total of 46 albums occupied the peak position on the chart. Arashi's Love was the best-selling album of 2013.

== Chart history ==
Key
†	Indicates best-selling album of 1999

Issue date	Album	Artist(s)	Ref.
January 7	Miracle	Sandaime J Soul Brothers	
January 14	Miracle	Sandaime J Soul Brothers	
January 21	A Classical	Ayumi Hamasaki	
January 28	Sid 10th Anniversary Best	Sid	
February 4	Justice	Glay	
February 11	Real	Mika Nakashima	
February 18	Love Again	Ayumi Hamasaki	
February 25	Legend of 2PM	2PM	
March 4	Super Best Records: 15th Celebration	Misia	
March 11	Teppen Tottande!	NMB48	
March 18	Time	Tohoshinki	
March 25	Sakanaction	Sakanaction	
April 1	The Best "Story"	Boowy	
April 8	Good Ikuze!	Kis-My-Ft2	
April 15	Funky Monkey Babys Last Best	Funky Monkey Babys	
April 22	5th Dimension	Momoiro Clover Z	
April 29	Lesson 1	E-Girls	
May 6	The Past Masters Vol.1	Golden Bomber	
May 13	Land	Yuzu	
May 20	Kaba (カバ)	Tsuyoshi Domoto	
May 27	All Time Best Album	Eikichi Yazawa	
June 3	Delight	Miwa	
June 10	Mekakucity Records (メカクシティレコーズ)	Jin (Shizen no Teki-P)	
June 17	Koi ni Ochiru Toki	Infinite	
June 24	B'z The Best XXV 1988-1998	B'z	
July 1	B'z The Best XXV 1988-1998	B'z	
July 8	Nanda Collection	Kyary Pamyu Pamyu	
July 15	Bump of Chicken I 1999-2004	Bump of Chicken	
July 22	Feel	Namie Amuro	
July 29	NEWS	NEWS	
August 5	I	Ikimono-gakari	
August 12	Yoshu Fukushu	Maximum the Hormone	
August 19	Yoshu Fukushu	Maximum the Hormone	
August 26	Yoshu Fukushu	Maximum the Hormone	
September 2	Kyosuke Himuro 25th Anniversary Best Album Greatest Anthology	Kyosuke Himuro	
September 9	Amachan Uta no Album	Various Artists	
September 16	Love Collection ~Mint~	Kana Nishino	
September 23	Chiisana Ikimono (小さな生き物)	Spitz	
September 30	Eighth Wonder	AAA	
October 7	Superfly Best	Superfly	
October 14	Level3	Perfume	
October 21	Superfly Best	Superfly	
October 28	Juke Box	Kanjani Eight	
November 4	Love †	Arashi	
November 11	Love †	Arashi	
November 18	Artpop	Lady Gaga	
November 25	Generations	Generations from Exile Tribe	
December 2	PORNOGRAFFITTI 15th Anniversary "ALL TIME SINGLES"	Porno Graffitti	
December 9	Kusabi	KAT-TUN	
December 16	L album	KinKi Kids	
December 23	Love & Peace	Girls' Generation	
December 30	One Song from Two Hearts	Kobukuro	

== See also ==
- 2013 in music
