= Bonham (Rouse) =

Percussion ensemble piece

Bonham is a percussion ensemble piece for eight musicians by the American composer Christopher Rouse. It was composed in 1988 and first performed in Boston, Massachusetts, the following year by the New England Conservatory of Music Percussion Ensemble conducted by Frank Epstein, to whom the work is dedicated.

The work, an "ode to rock drumming and drummers", is a tribute to John Bonham, the drummer from Led Zeppelin, whom Rouse admired for his almost "orchestral approach" to the drums and his ability to produce a powerful "sonic onslaught". Rouse also perceived precision and subtlety in Bonham's performances.

Bonham opens with the drum ostinato from "When the Levee Breaks". This is one of a number of references to Led Zeppelin songs in the work: "Custard Pie" is also quoted and the piece ends with a reference to "Royal Orleans". The percussionist on the drum set is instructed to use "the fattest possible sticks" to reproduce Bonham's distinctive sound throughout the entire work. In addition to Led Zeppelin songs, "Get Yourself Together" by The Butterfield Blues Band and the traditional "hambone" rhythm of Bo Diddley are cited.

== See also ==
- Thunderstuck
