= Heaven (Namie Amuro song) =

Promotional single by Namie Amuro

from the album Feel
- Released: July 10, 2013
- Recorded: 2012
- Genre: Trance; electro house
- Length: 3:31
- Label: Avex Trax; Dimension Point
- Songwriters: Emyli; Anton Zaslavski; Tommy Clint
- Producer: Zedd

"Heaven" is a song by Japanese recording artist Namie Amuro from her eleventh studio album and second bilingual album Feel (2013). The song was released as the album's lead promotional single on July 10, 2013, the same release date as Feel. "Heaven" was written by Emyli and produced by German-Russian DJ Zedd. Composed by Zedd, Emyli and Tommy Clint, "Heaven" is a house song.

The song received positive reviews from music critics, who commended the song's composition and production while some criticized Amuro's English pronunciation and felt it was a weaker track on the album. "Heaven" reached number twenty-six on the Japan Hot 100, alongside the two other promotional singles "Hands on Me" and "La La La". A music video was shot for the single by Nino, featuring Amuro dancing inside a futuristic club. "Heaven" was included on two of Amuro's concert tours, the Namie Amuro Feel 2013 Tour and Namie Amuro Live Style 2014.

== Background and composition ==
"Heaven"
"Heaven" is a house song that contains influences of rave and eurodance.

"Heaven" was written by Emyli, produced by German-Russian DJ Zedd and composed by Zedd, Emyli and Tommy Clint. After the breakthrough of Zedd's success with his singles "Clarity", Amuro's label Dimension Point and Avex Trax contacted him to produce a song for Amuro's album Feel which he accepted. This was Amuro's first collaboration with Zedd, and they would later collaborate again on her 2015 studio album Genic despite none of his songs making the final cut. Emyli started collaborating with Amuro since her 2012 album Uncontrolled and sung background vocals for "Heaven".

"Heaven" was recorded at Avex Studio in Tokyo, Japan where Zedd had attended for the recording. Musically, "Heaven" is a house song with influences of rave and eurodance and incorporates rap segments through the verses. Random J from his own online blog commented that Amuro's rapping through "Heaven" and another album track "Supernatural Love" were "almost fluent", noting that she could not pronounce "heaven" properly. Patrick St. Michel from The Japan Times commented that "nearly every track indulges in electronic trends, sometimes besting the American competition." A reviewer from Arcadey.net compared the composition to "Where Have You Been" by American-Barbados singer Rihanna and "Skirt" by Australian singer Kylie Minogue.

== Reception ==
"Heaven" received positive reviews from most music critics. Random J commented, "UK and US radio could play "Hands On Me" or "Heaven" in between a Rihanna and a Pitbull track and nobody would question it or wonder 'What the fuck was that!?." He also praised the production and highlighted the track as an album stand out, but had minor criticism towards Amuro's English pronunciation. St. Michel highlighted the song as an album standout, praising Zedd's collaboration with Amuro. Michael McCarthy from Otakudx.com gave the song a mixed review. In his track-by-track comments, he said that he felt "Heaven" was the weakest song on the album, saying also, "Which isn't to say that it's a bad song. I actually like it quite a bit, but the lyrics are cheesy and ZEDD's production here feels a bit thin compared to his usual work. Also, it almost sounds like Namie is singing in a different key than the music during parts of this song." He criticized Amuro's vocals for being "sliced and diced", the lyrical content and Amuro's English pronunciation. A reviewer from Arcadey.net highlighted "Heaven" and album tracks "Alive" and "Hands on Me" as the album's standout tracks.

"Heaven" charted alongside album tracks "Hands on Me" and "La La La" on Japan Hot 100, and debuted at number 53. It reached 26 the following week and stayed in the chart for two weeks. The song entered at number thirty-one on the Japan Hot Radio Songs chart and peaked at number fifteen the following week; it stayed in the chart for two weeks.

== Music video and promotion ==
"Heaven" received a music video and was directed by Nino, who also directed the rest of the promotional tracks from Feel. The music opens with the song title and has Amuro dancing with back-up dancers inside a black and white club. Intercut scenes feature a close-up shot of Amuro in a pink neon room singing the track. A reviewer from Anime Arsenal awarded the video 8.5 out of ten points, praising the video's visual effects, choreography, cinematography and intercut switching.

"Heaven" was included on two of Amuro's concert tours, the Namie Amuro Feel 2013 Tour and Namie Amuro Live Style 2014. The song was included in the live albums and DVDs of the tours.

== Credits and personnel ==
Song credits

- Namie Amuro – vocals, management
- Anton Zaslavski – composer, producer
- Emyli – songwriter, composer, background vocals
- Tommy Clint – composer
- FZ – programming
- Chris Gehringer – mastering, mixing

Visual and video credits

- Nino – director
- Nobuaki Imura – cinematography
- Koji Yoshino – lighting
- Satomi Kurihara – make-up
- Takaki Kumada – photographer
- Akemi Nakano – hair and make-up

Credits adapted from the album's liner notes.

== Charts ==
Chart (2013)	Peak position
Japan Hot 100 (Billboard)	26
Japan Adult Contemporary (Billboard)	3
