= Brighter Day (song) =

- CD/DVD and download editions' cover

Single by Namie Amuro
- B-side: "Sweet Kisses" "Still Lovin' You"
- Released: November 12, 2014
- Recorded: 2014
- Genre: J-pop; R&B
- Length: 3:57
- Label: Avex Trax; Dimension Point
- Lyricist: Tiger
- Producers: Erik Lidbom; Ylva Dimberg

Namie Amuro singles chronology
"Tsuki" (2014)	"Brighter Day" (2014)	"What I Did for Love" (2015)

"Brighter Day" is a song by Japanese recording artist Namie Amuro. Released as a single on November 12, 2014 by Amuro's label Dimension Point through Avex Trax, the release contained the B-sides "Sweet Kisses", and "Still Lovin' You". It received mixed reviews from music critics; many commended Amuro's vocal abilities while some criticized the song's composition and production. Charted as a single on the Japanese Oricon Singles Chart, it reached number eight, becoming her lowest chart single since "Alarm" which peaked at eleven. The title track was certified platinum by Recording Industry Association of Japan (RIAJ) for digital sales of 250,000 and all three tracks charted on the Japan Hot 100.

== Background and release ==
"Brighter Day"
A sample of "Brighter Day", which is an upbeat pop number that incorporates string, piano, and drum instrumentations.

Following the trend of "Tsuki", "Brighter Day" and its three tracks were released through commercial deals and television appearances. Japanese beauty company Kosee premiered both "Still Lovin' You" and "Sweet Kisses" through a commercial; this was the second EP to conduct songs for Kosee, following "Neonlight Lipstick" from "Tsuki". "Brighter Day" was used as the theme song for the Fuji TV film First Class. The title track was described to "open with an impressive string instrument arrangement and transitions into a vocal performance by Namie on top of a strong beat." The lyrical content talks about helping loved ones in bad situations.

"Brighter Day" premiered on Japanese radio station J-Wave on October 15, 2013, followed by "Still Lovin' You" on October 16 and October 20. Although released on November 5 through Chaku-Uta, Amuro confirmed the release of "Brighter Day" on her website and was subsequently released physically in both CD and DVD formats in Japan and digitally worldwide on November 12, 2014. The DVD version came with a limited edition poster of the cover artwork and featured the videos of "Brighter Day" and "Sweet Kisses". The CD features all three tracks, along with their instrumental versions.

== Reception ==
"Brighter Day" charted as a single on the Oricon Singles Chart and peaked at number eight. Present for thirteen weeks in the chart, "Brighter Day" became Amuro's lowest charting single since her 2004 single "Alarm" which peaked at eleven. The single sold over 53,000 units in Japan. The title track was certified platinum by the Recording Industry Association of Japan (RIAJ) for exceeding 250,000 digital sales. "Brighter Day", "Sweet Kisses" and "Still Lovin' You" charted individually on the Japan Hot 100 at three, fifty-six and forty-nine respectively.

== Promotion ==
The teaser music video to "Brighter Day" premiered on Amuro's YouTube channel on November 4, 2014, showing her in a white room in front of a car and making finger gestures. The teaser music video to "Sweet Kisses" premiered on November 11, showing Amuro in a circus-like stage with back up dancers. All three tracks were included in her Namie Amuro Live Style 2014 Tour.

== Track listing ==
CD single/Digital EP

1. "Brighter Day" – 3:51
2. "Sweet Kisses" – 2:45
3. "Still Lovin' You" – 4:09
4. "Brighter Day" (Instrumental) – 3:51
5. "Sweet Kisses" (Instrumental) – 2:45
6. "Still Lovin' You" (Instrumental) – 4:09

== Charts ==
Chart (2014)	Peak position
Japan (Japan Hot 100)	3
Japan (Oricon)	8

== Certifications ==
Region	Certification	Certified units/sales
Japan (RIAJ) Digital single	Platinum	250,000^{*}
Japan Physical single	—	53,000
^{*} Sales figures based on certification alone.
