= 2013 in Japanese music =

The year 2013 in Japanese music.

== Events ==
- 64th NHK Kōhaku Uta Gassen
- Rising Sun Rock Festival, August 16th–17th, 2013
- Rock in Japan Festival, August 2nd–4th, 2013

== Best-sellers ==
- Best-selling singles

== Number-ones ==
- Number-one albums
- Oricon number-one singles
- Hot 100 number-one singles

== Awards ==
- 2013 MTV Video Music Awards Japan

== Deaths ==
- Eiichi Ohtaki dies on December 30.

== Groups disestablished ==
- Move

== Albums released ==
=== January ===
Day	Title	Artist	Genre(s)	Labels
8	A Classical	Ayumi Hamasaki	Classical	

=== February ===
Day	Title	Artist	Genre(s)	Labels
8	Love Again	Ayumi Hamasaki	J-pop, dance-pop, pop rock	
13	Legend of 2PM	2PM	J-pop, Dance-pop	Ariola Japan
27	D'scover	Daesung	J-pop, Alternative rock	YGEX

=== March ===
Day	Title	Artist	Genre(s)	Labels
6	Time	TVXQ	Pop J-pop, R&B, Electropop, Dance-pop, Dubstep	Avex Trax
13	Orange Caramel	Orange Caramel	J-pop, Dance-pop, Electropop	Avex Trax
13	Sakanaction	Sakanaction	Dance rock, electronica	Victor Entertainment
13	On the Way	The Boss	J-pop	Sony Music Entertainment
20	Can Your Hear Me?	IU	J-pop	EMI Music Japan
27	We Are Myname	Myname	Dance	YM3D

=== April ===
Day	Title	Artist	Genre(s)	Labels
3	Fate(s)	Gummy	J-pop, Dance-pop	YGEX
15	The First Collage -Japan Edition-	Yang Yo-seob	K-pop, Dance-pop	Far Eastern Tribe Records
15	In the Wind (Japan Edition)	B1A4	K-pop, Dance-pop	Pony Canyon

=== May ===
Day	Title	Artist	Genre(s)	Labels
29	Seventh Mission	Boyfriend	J-pop, Dance-pop	Being Group

=== June ===
Day	Title	Artist	Genre(s)	Labels
5	Koi ni Ochiru Toki	Infinite	J-pop	Woolim Contests, Universal D
5	Rated-FT	F.T. Island	J-pop	AI Entertainment
26	Boys Meet U	Shinee	J-pop	EMI Music Japan
26	Me No Do Karate.	Alexandros	Rock	RX-Records

=== July ===
Day	Title	Artist	Genre(s)	Labels
3	Bump of Chicken I [1999–2004]	Bump of Chicken		
3	Bump of Chicken II [2005–2010]	Bump of Chicken		
17	Moriagaro	Ai	R&B	EMI Records Japan
24	Inside of Me	U-Kiss	J-pop	Avex Trax
24	Hero	Super Junior	J-pop	Avex Trax
31	Kiss Tour	LEDApple	J-pop	Universal Music Japan

=== August ===
Day	Title	Artist	Genre(s)	Labels
7	Treasure Box	T-ara	J-pop	EMI Music Japan
28	Fantastic Girls	Kara	J-pop	Universal Sigma
28	What Turns You On?	CNBLUE	J-pop	Warner Music Japan

=== September ===
Day	Title	Artist	Genre(s)	Labels
18	The Singles Collection	F.T. Island	Rock	AI Entertainment

=== October ===
Day	Title	Artist	Genre(s)	Labels
2	Standard	Scandal	Pop rock / Alternative rock	Epic Records Japan
2	Level3	Perfume	J-pop, Japanese Rock, Dance/Electronic	Epic Records Japan
9	Let's Talk About Love	Seungri	J-pop, Dance-pop	YGEX

=== December ===
Day	Title	Artist	Genre(s)	Labels
3	Six	Supernova	J-pop	Universal Music Japan
11	Love & Peace	Girls' Generation	J-pop	Universal Music Japan
11	A Will	Luna Sea	Alternative rock, progressive rock	Universal Music Japan

== See also ==
- 2013 in Japan
- 2013 in Japanese television
- List of Japanese films of 2013
