= Tsuki (song) =

- Artwork used to commercialize the physical edition of "Tsuki".

Single by Namie Amuro

from the album Ballada
- B-side: "Neonlight Lipstick"; "Ballerina"
- Released: January 29, 2014
- Recorded: 2013
- Genre: J-pop
- Length: 3:39
- Label: Avex Trax; Avex Music Creative Inc.; Dimension Point
- Songwriter: Tiger
- Producers: Hiro Doi; Zetton

Namie Amuro singles chronology
"Contrail" (2013)	"Tsuki" (2014)	"Brighter Day" (2014)

"Tsuki" (Japanese: 月; lit. "Moon", stylized as "TSUKI") is a song recorded by Japanese singer Namie Amuro for her ballad-inspired concept compilation, Ballada (2014). It was distributed by Avex Trax and Amuro's record label, Dimension Point, on January 29, 2014 in Japan, and released worldwide as a digital single by Avex Music Creative Inc. The physical and digital formats included the two B-side tracks "Neonlight Lipstick" and "Ballerina", which later served as promotional singles online. "Tsuki" was written by Tiger, whilst production was handled by Hiro Doi and Zetton. Musically, the single is a J-Pop ballad with instrumentation consisting of synthesizers, bells, and chimes.

Upon its release, "Tsuki" received favorable reviews from music critics. The majority of them complimented the composition, alongside praising Amuro's vocal performance and overall production. Commercially, the single experienced success in Japan, reaching number three on the Oricon Singles Chart and on the Japan Hot 100 chart. It was certified Platinum by the Recording Industry Association of Japan (RIAJ) for digital sales of 250,000 units. An accompanying music video for "Tsuki" shot by Naokazu Mitsuishi in Iceland, and features Amuro in a vast field of snow, ice, and grass. To promote the single, it was used for the 2014 film Dakishimetai: Shinjitsu no Monogatari and was performed on the singer's 2013 Feel tour and 2014 Live Style concert venue.

== Background and composition ==
On January 15, 2014, Japanese music media website Jame-World confirmed the release of Amuro's single "Tsuki" for January 29, 2014. When premiering the recording, the singer confirmed on her website that the tracks "Neonlight Lipstick" and "Ballerina", both of which were digitally released prior to "Tsuki", would appear as the single's B-sides; the former song was used as the commercial single for Japanese cosmetic company Kosee, whilst the latter was a collaboration with Gucci and Vogue Japan. The tracks have also been released through iTunes Store on October 16 and October 23, 2016, respectively. "Tsuki" was written by Japanese artist Tiger, while production was handled by Hiro Doi and Zetton. The recording was distributed by Avex Trax and Amuro's record label, Dimension Point, on January 29, 2014 in Japan, and released worldwide as a digital single by Avex Music Creative Inc. While the CD single features the title track, "Neon Lipstick", "Ballerina" and their respective instrumentals, the DVD single additionally incorporates their visuals. A digitally released extended play features all the six songs from the physical formats. The accompanying cover artwork—portraying Amuro inside a room full of shiny fabric and her wearing a long wedding dress—was shot by Japanese photographer Kazutaka Nakamura; it acts as an outtake of the singer's photoshoot for Japanese magazine Sweet.

Musically, "Tsuki" is a J-pop ballad whose instrumentation consists of synthesizers, keyboards, harps, and chimes. A reviewer of Japanese music magazine CD Journal described the production of the recording "minimal", whilst noting it as a mid-tempo track. In another review for her ballad-inspired concept compilation Ballada (2014), an editor noted elements of R&B and described the lyrical content as "warm yet sad". The song was composed by Fast Lane, Lisa Desmond, and Zetton, and was recorded in 2013 at Avex Sound Studios. The single's two B-sides were described as EDM tracks, whilst "Ballerina" samples elements of "Fire Power" (2012) by American disc jockey Wolfgang Gartner, for which he received credit as a co-songwriter.

== Reception ==
Upon its release, "Tsuki" received favorable reviews from music critics. Writing for Japanese music magazine CD Journal, a staff editor was positive in his/her report, and complimented the track's lyrical content, production and Amuro's vocal performance. When reviewing the singer's compilation album, another member of the website praised the song's "majestic" sound. Commercially, the single experienced success in Japan. It debuted at number three on the Oricon Singles Chart, selling 42,021 copies in its first week of availability, but slipping to number 11 the following week, shifting another 9,252 units in that region. In its third week, "Tsuki" dropped to number 21 and sold 4,794 units, lasting a total of five editions inside the top 50 and 14 weeks within the top 200. By the end of 2014, the single was ranked at number 90 on Oricon's Annual Singles Chart; by July 2016, it had sold 67,293 units in Japan. Additionally, it opened the Japan Hot 100 chart at number three, marking one of Amuro's highest-debuting releases, and staying in the chart for over ten weeks. Prior to the single's release, the B-side tracks "Neonlight Lipstick" and "Ballerina", entered the chart in October 2013 at number 16 and 25, respectively. In July 2014, "Tsuki" was certified Platinum by the Recording Industry Association of Japan (RIAJ) for digital sales of 250,000 copies.

== Music videos and promotion ==
Shot from the music video of "Ballerina", portraying Amuro sitting down on an armchair. Being a collaboration with Gucci and Vogue Japan, the idea was to explore the CGI production.

"Tsuki" and its B-side tracks were all accompanied by music videos; the first two were directed by Naokazu Mitsuishi, whilst the visual for "Ballerina" was directed by YKBX.

"Tsuki" was shot in Iceland, where it first featured Amuro in a smoggy field with snow falling on her. During the progression of the song, the smog starts to pass and shows icebergs. Subsequently, Amuro continues to sing to the song, while by the last chorus, the singer is featured in a large vast field of grass and meadow. The final scene is a panning shot of her dress, covered by grass and other flora and fauna. According to Amuro, she shot the video in Iceland because she felt the scenery reflected the theme of "resuscitation of life"; Mitsuishi further added that, "I want you to occasionally hum the lyrics. So in certain parts of the video, Amuro chose what parts of the song to sing, and what parts to hum." The music video was previewed by a teaser which premiered on YouTube on January 14, 2014.

The visual for "Neonlight Lipstick" is loosely based on the 1812 fairy tale Snow White, and features Amuro wearing a red dress (as the princess Snow White) while being present in a forest. For several shots, she is presented in a black cloak (as Evil Queen) accompanied by backup dancers; interspersed scenes show Amuro dancing on top of a book, with computer generated imagery and the background performers surrounding her. Prior to the clip's release, a preview was premiered on YouTube on November 25, 2013.

"Ballerina"'s clip acted as a collaboration with Gucci and Vogue Japan; it featured Amuro wearing clothing designed by Gucci, and being surrounded by several special effects inside a small mansion-esque structure. Throughout the video, there are lopped scenes of Amuro walking, with these being edited and cut in several ways. Scenes of Amuro sitting on a vast field of digitised grass are also presented, with jellyfish floating and other effects. Like the previous visual, "Ballerina" was accompanied by a teaser which was released on the same day on social media.

In order to promote the single, it was used as the theme song of the 2014 Japanese film Dakishimetai: Shinjitsu no Monogatari. Both "Neonlight Lipstick" and "Ballerina" were included on the set list for Amuro's 2013 Feel concert tour, which supported her album with the same name, and appeared on a live DVD. All three tracks were subsequently included on Amuro's 2014 Live Style tour, and on other physical releases. "Tsuki" was most recently performed on her 2015–16 Livegenic concert venue in Japan, which promoted Genic (2015).

== Track listing ==
CD single

1. "Tsuki" – 3:39
2. "Neonlight Lipstick" – 3:48
3. "Ballerina" – 2:57
4. "Tsuki" (Instrumental) – 3:39
5. "Neonlight Lipstick" (Instrumental) – 3:48
6. "Ballerina" (Instrumental) – 2:57

CD and DVD

1. "Tsuki" – 3:39
2. "Neonlight Lipstick" – 3:48
3. "Ballerina" – 2:57
4. "Tsuki" (Instrumental) – 3:39
5. "Neonlight Lipstick" (Instrumental) – 3:48
6. "Ballerina" (Instrumental) – 2:57
7. "Tsuki" (music video)
8. "Neonlight Lipstick" (music video)
9. "Ballerina" (music video)

Digital EP

1. "Tsuki" – 3:39
2. "Neonlight Lipstick" – 3:48
3. "Ballerina" – 2:57
4. "Tsuki" (Instrumental) – 3:39
5. "Neonlight Lipstick" (Instrumental) – 3:48
6. "Ballerina" (Instrumental) – 2:57

Neonlight Lipstick digital single

1. "Neonlight Lipstick" – 3:48

Ballerina digital single

1. "Ballerina" – 2:57

== Credits and personnel ==
Credits adapted from the liner notes of the single's physical release.

Technical and songwriting credits

- Namie Amuro – vocals, management (All tracks)
- Zetton – composer, producer (track #1)
- Tiger – songwriter (track #1 and #2)
- Hiro Doi – composer (track #1)
- Fast Lane – producer, composer (track #1)
- Lisa Desmond – producer, composer (track #1)
- Steven Lee – songwriter (track #2)
- Lasse Lindorff – songwriter (track #2)
- Charli Taft – songwriter (track #2)
- Gennessee Lewis – songwriter (track #3)
- Cait La Dee – songwriter (track #3)
- Wolfgang Gartner – songwriter, composer, producer (track #3)
- P.O.S. – songwriter (track #3)

Visual and video credits

- Naokazu Mitsuishi – director (track #1 and #2)
- YKBX – director (track #3)
- Hiromi – dancer (track #2)
- Miki – dancer (track #2)
- Risa – dancer (track #2)
- Yuu – dancer (track #2)
- Ako – choreographer (track #2)
- Takuro Iwagami – cinematographer (track #1 and #2)
- Kenshu Shintsuho – cinematographer (track #3)
- Shogen Yamamoto – lighting director
- Kenjiro Harigai – art direction
- Manabu Honchu – design
- Kanako Oi – design
- Kazutaka Nakamuta – photographer
- Satomi Kurihara – nails and make-up
- Akita Noda – stylist

== Charts ==
=== Daily and weekly charts ===
Chart (2013–14)	Peak position
Japan Singles Chart (Oricon)	3
Billboard Japan Hot 100	3
Japan Hot 100 (Billboard) "Neonlight Lipstick"	16
Japan Hot 100 (Billboard) "Ballerina"	25

=== Year-end charts ===
Chart (2014)	Peak position
Japan Singles Chart (Oricon)	90
Billboard Japan Hot 100	31

== Certifications ==
Region	Certification	Certified units/sales
Japan CD version.	—	67,293
Japan (RIAJ) digital	Platinum	250,000

== Release history ==
Region	Date	Format	Label
Japan	January 29, 2014	CD single	Avex Trax; Dimension Point
Taiwan	January 29, 2014	CD single	Avex Taiwan; Dimension Point
Japan	January 29, 2014	CD and DVD	Avex Trax; Dimension Point
Taiwan	January 29, 2014	CD and DVD	Avex Taiwan; Dimension Point
Japan	January 29, 2014	Digital download	Avex Trax; Avex Music Creative Inc.
Australia	January 29, 2014	Digital download	Avex Trax; Avex Music Creative Inc.
New Zealand	January 29, 2014	Digital download	Avex Trax; Avex Music Creative Inc.
United Kingdom	January 29, 2014	Digital download	Avex Trax; Avex Music Creative Inc.
Ireland	January 29, 2014	Digital download	Avex Trax; Avex Music Creative Inc.
Germany	January 29, 2014	Digital download	Avex Trax; Avex Music Creative Inc.
Spain	January 29, 2014	Digital download	Avex Trax; Avex Music Creative Inc.
France	January 29, 2014	Digital download	Avex Trax; Avex Music Creative Inc.
Italy	January 29, 2014	Digital download	Avex Trax; Avex Music Creative Inc.
Taiwan	January 29, 2014	Digital download	Avex Trax; Avex Music Creative Inc.
United States	January 29, 2014	Digital download	Avex Trax; Avex Music Creative Inc.
Canada	January 29, 2014	Digital download	Avex Trax; Avex Music Creative Inc.
