= Kultura (Belarusian newspaper) =

Belarusian newspaper

- Founded: 1991
- Country: Belarus
- Language: Belarusian
- Website: http://www.kimpress.by

Kultura ("Culture") is a Belarusian weekly social and educational newspaper founded by the Ministry of Culture of the Republic of Belarus.

== History ==
Kultura was founded by the Ministry of Culture of the Republic of Belarus in October 1991. The content covers fine arts, film, literature, music, theater and television, architecture, history, folklore and ethnography. From May 1993 to February 1997, the newspaper published a monthly literary and philosophical piece, including research on cultural studies. Since 2002, Kultura along with «Мастацтва» ("Art") newspaper have been a part of the editorial and publishing institution of «Культура і мастацтва» ("Culture and Art").

== Chief editors ==
  - Olga Ipatova (1991-1995)
  - Ludmila Krushynskaya (1995—2012)
  - Sergey Trofilov (2012-2017)
  - Iliya Sin (since 2017)

== Awards ==
1998 - Laureate of the Spiritual Revival Award (national award)

== Bibliography ==
- Беларуская энцыклапедыя: У 18 т. / Рэдкал.: Г. П. Пашкоў і інш.. — Мн.: БелЭн, 1999. — Т. 9: Кулібін — Малаіта. — 560 с. — 10 000 экз. — ISBN 985-11-0155-9 (т. 9), ISBN 985-11-0035-8.
