= Thunderstuck =

Orchestral composition by Christopher Rouse

Thunderstuck is a one-movement orchestral composition by the American composer Christopher Rouse. The piece was completed December 29, 2013, and premiered October 9, 2014, in Avery Fisher Hall, New York City. The premiere was performed by conductor Alan Gilbert and the New York Philharmonic, and the work is dedicated to both.

== Composition ==
=== Styles and influences ===
The style of Thunderstuck celebrates rock and roll music of the 1970s. In the program notes, Rouse called the work "a nine-minute concert opener that reflects my continuing love of the popular music of my younger years. Rock music has had an influence on several of my works, but none more so than this one." Its conception is similar to that of Rouse's 1988 percussion ensemble piece Bonham, a tribute to rock drummers and named after Led Zeppelin drummer John Bonham.

Thunderstuck directly references the 1978 Jay Ferguson song "Thunder Island", which partially inspired the work's title. David Allen of The New York Times has also compared the piece to the music of Jefferson Airplane.

=== Instrumentation ===
Thunderstuck is scored for three flutes, three oboes, two clarinets, bass clarinet, two bassoons, contrabassoon, four French horns, three trumpets, three trombones, tuba, harp, timpani, percussion (three players), and strings (violins I & II, violas, violoncellos, and double basses).

== Reception ==
Reviewing the 2014 premiere of Thunderstuck, music critic Lewis M. Smoley lauded the work, saying, "Permeated with syncopated and chugging rhythms, brash outbursts and colorful orchestration, the music splashed across the sonic spectrum, energized by youthful vigor, and at times evocative of the music of Aaron Copland or Roy Harris." Despite criticizing the premiere performance, David Allen of The New York Times also praised the piece, saying, "It's designed to be a fun concert opener, and it is." Eric C. Simpson of the New York Classical Review was slightly more critical, saying, "Rouse says the work is meant to be 'engaging and fun.' It is both those things to some degree, though it is also completely out of left field, both in general and for Rouse specifically. Suave, punchy, and almost oppressively consonant, it sounds as though it could accompany a training montage in a boxing movie."
