= 2013 in Irish music =

This is a summary of the year 2013 in Irish music.

== Monthly summary ==
=== January ===
- 17 January – Shannon Winter Music Weekend.
- 22 January – Temple Bar Trad Fest.
- 26 January – Country & Western Weekend.

=== February ===
- 9 February – The Gealach Gorm Singer/Songwriter Festival.
- 13 February – 12 Points Jazz Festival.
- 20 February – The Gathering Festival.
- 20 February – Belfast Nashville Songwriters Festival.
- 22 February – Kiltimagh Choral Festival.
- 27 February – Corofin Traditional Festival.

=== March ===
- 11 March – ESB Electric Ireland Feis Ceoil.
- 22 March – Inishowen Traditional Singers' Circle.
- 30 March – Ballydehob Traditional Music Festival.

=== April ===
- 5 April – Driochead Festival.
- 10 April – Pan Celtic International Festival.
- 12 April – Seshtival.
- 12 April – Clifden Traditional Music Festival.
- 15 April – Waterford New Music Week.
- 19 April – The Shindig Festival.
- 26 April – Feile na nDeise.
- 26 April – Guitar Festival of Ireland.

=== May ===
- 1 May – Feile na Bealtaine.
- 1 May – Cork International Choral Festival.
- 2 May – Waterford International Music Festival.
- 2 May – Cathedral Quarter Music & Arts Festival.
- 2 May – City of Derry Jazz and Big Band Festival.
- 2 May – Bray Jazz Festival.
- 2 May – Drogheda Arts Festival.
- 3 May – Feile Chois Cuain.
- 3 May – Cup of Tae Festival.
- 3 May – Vantastival.
- 3 May – Phoenix Arts Festival.
- 3 May – May Country Music Festival.
- 3 May – Little Big Weekend.
- 3 May – Inishbofin Arts Festival.
- 3 May – Athboy Live.
- 3 May – Coors Live at the Latin Quarter.
- 3 May – Feile Oriel.
- 3 May – Kilkenny Rhythm and Roots.
- 3 May – Ballydehob Jazz Festival.
- 3 May – Summer Fest.
- 4 May – Festival of the Fires.
- 5 May – MANGO all day party.
- 8 May – Baltimore Fiddle Fair.
- 10 May – Camden Crawl Dublin.
- 10 May – Gospel Rising Music Festival.
- 11 May – Nass Breakdown Sessions.
- 16 May – Galway Early Music Festival.
- 17 May – Fleadh Nua.
- 23 May – Mayo International Choral Festival.
- 23 May – Dublin City Soul Festival.
- 24 May – LINK Culture Fest.
- 24 May – Wicklow Arts Festival.
- 24 May – Iniscealtra Festival of Arts.
- 24 May – Life Festival.
- 24 May – Donegal Live.
- 29 May – Indie Week Ireland.
- 30 May – The Clancy Brothers Festival.
- 30 May – Rory Gallagher International Tribute Festival.

=== June ===
- 1 June – Doonbeg International Jazz Festival.
- 1 June – Nitrogen Festival.
- 1 June – Forbidden Fruit.
- 1 June – Moe Fest.
- 1 June – Strawberry Fest.
- 1 June – Burren Summer Festival – Féile An tSamhraidh.
- 1 June – Barcastle Free Music Festival.
- 1 June – Lismore Music Festival.
- 1 June – Cold Pro Music and Surf Festival
- 1 June – Shamrock Music Festival.
- 1 June – The Happy Valley Festival.
- 1 June – Pigstock Festival.
- 1 June – Castlebar Blues & Beyond.
- 1 June – Little Havana Festival.
- 2 June – Inistioge Summer Festival.
- 2 June – Pop Picnic.
- 2 June – Woodstock Revisited.
- 6 June – Flat Lake Festival
- 7 June – Arcadia Festival.
- 7 June – Temple House Festival.
- 7 June – Eigse Carlow Arts Festival.
- 7 June – Live at Leopardstown.
- 8 June – Gentlemen of the Road.
- 8 June – Tain Summer Festival.
- 8 June – Helium.
- 11 June – KBC Great Music in Irish Houses.
- 12 June – Clare County Fleadh.
- 14 June – NPLD (No Place Like Dome).
- 14 June – The Fastnet Maritime and Folk Festival.
- 15 June – Face Fest.
- 18 June – Mayo Alive.
- 19 June – Bushmills Live.
- 20 June – Love Live Music.
- 20 June – Féile Brian Ború.
- 20 June – Cork Midsummer Festival.
- 21 June – Glenties Busking Festival.
- 21 June – Body & Soul.
- 21 June – Open House Festival.
- 21 June – Drogheda Samba Festival.
- 21 June – Live on Spike.
- 22 June – BBA Taking Control.
- 22 June – Fortstock.
- 26 June – Irish Performing Arts Festival.
- 26 June – Celtronic.
- 26 June – Solstice.
- 27 June – Summer Carnival.
- 28 June – West Cork Chamber Music Festival.
- 28 June – Summer Madness.
- 28 June – Celtic Fusion.
- 28 June – Sea Sessions Surf & Music Festival.
- 28 June – Westport Festival of Music and Performing Arts.
- 28 June – Louth Music Festival.
- 28 June – Rocky Mayhem.
- 28 June – Westport Folk & Bluegrass Festival.
- 28 June – Bump! Muzik Festival.
- 29 June – Rhythm Fest.
- 29 June – The Island Jam.
- 29 June – Dylan Fest.

=== July ===
- 4 July – Carrick on Shannon Water Music Festival.
- 5 July – Cairde festival.
- 5 July – Burning Oak Festival.
- 5 July – Willowstone Arts & Music Festival
- 5 July – Riverside Jump.
- 6 July – Bray Summer Fest.
- 6 July – Oxegen.
- 6 July – Clonmel Junction Festival.
- 6 July – Make A Move.
- 6 July – Kinsale Arts Week.
- 6 July – Earagail Arts Festival.
- 7 July – Aran Trad Fest.
- 12 July – Athy Bluegrass Festival.
- 12 July – Carbon Dioxide Festival
- 12 July – Donegal Town Summer Festival.
- 12 July – Templebar Beatles Fest.
- 12 July – Link Fest.
- 12 July – Dalriada Arts Festival.
- 13 July – Tra Fest.
- 15 July – Venice of Ireland Festival.
- 15 July – Galway Fringe Festival.
- 15 July – Galway Arts Festival.
- 17 July – Liberties Festival.
- 19 July – Loughcrew Garden Opera.
- 19 July – Festival of World Cultures
- 19 July – Hilltown New Music Festival.
- 20 July – Ceol at the O.
- 20 July – Dublin Flamenco Festival.
- 20 July – Glasgowbury.
- 21 July – Fiddler's Green Festival.
- 21 July – Ulster Fleadh.
- 24 July – Sligo Jazz Festival.
- 26 July – Buncrana Music Festival.
- 26 July – Skibbereen Arts Festival.
- 26 July – Abhainn Rí Festival.
- 26 July – Westport Music Festival.
- 26 July – Waterford Music Fest
- 26 July – Boyle Arts Festival.
- 26 July – Ballyshannon Folk & Trad Music Festival.
- 26 July – Killarney Summer Fest.
- 26 July – Walled City Music Festival.
- 26 July – KnockanStockan.
- 28 July – Mary From Dungloe International Festival.
- 30 July – Sunset Festival.

=== August ===
- 2 August – Ballyshannon Trad and Folk Music Festival.
- 2 August – Clonakilty Waterfront Festival.
- 2 August – Scariff Harbour Festival.
- 3 August – Spraoi Festival.
- 3 August – Carrigallen Summer Festival.
- 3 August – Farney Music Festival.
- 3 August – Indiependence Music & Arts Festival.
- 3 August – Castlepalooza.
- 3 August – Sean McCarthy Memorial Weekend Festival.
- 3 August – Le Cheile.
- 3 August – Forfey Festival.
- 3 August – Birr Vintage Week and Arts Festival.
- 3 August – Ranalagh Arts Festival.
- 3 August – Cahersiveen Festival of Music & the Arts.
- 3 August – Belfast Taste & Music Fest.
- 3 August – Booleigh Ska Festival.
- 3 August – Americana & Roots Weekend.
- 4 August – Old Fair Day Festival.
- 4 August – Féile Ghleanncholmcille.
- 4 August – Liss Ard Festival.
- 5 August – Joy Music Festival.
- 5 August – Kingscourt Festival.
- 6 August – Northside Music Festival.
- 8 August – Feakle Trad Festival.
- 10 August – Mohill Bluegrass Festival.
- 10 August – Puck Fair.
- 10 August — Kilkenny Arts Festival.
- 11 August – Dublin Latin American Festival.
- 11 August – Jam in the Park.
- 13 August – Fleadh Cheoil.
- 15 August – Terry Glass Arts Festival.
- 15 August – Masters of Tradition.
- 15 August – Belsonic.
- 17 August – Jack of Diamonds Rhythm & Roots Festival.
- 17 August – Down with Jazz.
- 17 August — Stendhal Festival.
- 17 August – Back to Basics – Rose of Tralee Carnival.
- 17 August – Sunflower Fest.
- 17 August – Killruddery Music Festival.
- 17 August – The Marquee in Drumlish.
- 18 August – Ululele Hooley.
- 18 August – Letterkenny Live.
- 18 August – New Ross Summer Festival.
- 19 August – Danny's Garden Music Festival.
- 19 August – Decades Festival.
- 21 August – Tennents Vital Festival.
- 23 August – Ballinamore Free Fringe Festival.
- 24 August – Dunmore East Bluegrass Festival.
- 24 August – Belly Bang.
- 24 August – Prosperous Music Festival.
- 24 August – City of Derry Guitar Festival.
- 25 August – Jollylands.
- 25 August – Tara Rocks.
- 30 August – Kilkenny International Gospel Music Festival.
- 31 August – Appalachian & Bluegrass Music Festival.
- 31 August — Electric Picnic.

=== September ===
- 1 September – Phizzfest.
- 6 September – Dingle Trad/Fusion Festival.
- 6 September – Gig 'n The Bann.
- 7 September – Harvest Time Blues.
- 7 September – Tulla Trad Festival.
- 8 September – Slane Castle.
- 8 September – Absolute Fringe.
- 8 September – Skerries Soundwaves.
- 9 September – The Blackstairs Blues Festival.
- 10 September – Planet Love.
- 12 September – Navan Live.
- 13 September – Dunfanaghy Jazz and Blues Festival 2011.
- 13 September – A French Revelation.
- 14 September – Tuam Trad Festival.
- 15 September – John Martyn Tribute Festival.
- 17 September – Mystik Fest.
- 20 September – Clifden Arts Week.
- 20 September – Guinness Cobh Blues Festival.
- 20 September – Shorelines Art Festival.
- 20 September – Clonakilty International Guitar Festival.
- 20 September – Johnny Keenan Banjo Festival.
- 21 September – Spirit of Folk Festival.
- 24 September – The Green Village Music & Arts Festival.
- 24 September – Dublin International Gospel Music Festival.
- 25 September – YES Festival.
- 27 September – New Ross Piano Festival.
- 27 September – Guinness Live at the Latin Quarter.
- 27 September – Engage Arts Festival.
- 28 September – Limerick Jazz Festival.
- 28 September – Sligo Festival of Baroque Music.
- 29 September – Kilkenny Celtic Festival.
- 30 September – Sligo Traditional Singing Weekend.
- 30 September – Galway Jazz Festival.
- 30 September – Kerry International Chamber Music Festival.

=== October ===
- 1 October — Oxjam.
- 1 October – Westport Arts Festival.
- 4 October — East Cork Early Music Festival.
- 4 October – Hard Working Class Heroes.
- 5 October – O' Carolan Harp, Culture & Heritage Festival.
- 6 October – One Night Music Festival.
- 12 October – Feile Frank McGann.
- 14 October – Belfast Fringe.
- 15 October – Baboró – International Arts Festival for Children.
- 18 October – Becks Rhythm Weekender.
- 18 October – The Roe Valley Arts Festival.
- 19 October – Imagine Arts Festival.
- 19 October – Belfast Festival at Queen's.
- 19 October – MUSIC and craic in the Glen.
- 20 October – Imagine Trad Festival.
- 20 October – Cooley-Collins Traditional Music Festival.
- 24 October – Festival Folk.
- 24 October – Wexford Opera Festival.
- 24 October – Sligo Live.
- 25 October – Virginia Pumpkin Festival.
- 25 October – Beat Yard.
- 26 October – Willie Keane memorial weekend.
- 26 October – Patrick O'Keeffe Traditional Music Festival.
- 26 October – Cork Jazz Festival.
- 26 October – Hunters Moon Music and Art Festival.
- 26 October – South Roscommon Singers Festival.
- 26 October – Patrick O'Keefe Traditional Music Festival.
- 26 October – Kinsale Jazz Festival.
- 27 October – Cloughtoberfest Gypsy Jazz Festival.
- 28 October – The Mansion Festival.
- 28 October – Afro Ireland Festival.

=== November ===
- 7 November – Dublin Beatles Festival.
- 7–11 November – Ennis Trad Festival.
- 9 November – The All Ireland Elvis Festival.
- 9 November – Spirit of Voice Festival.
- 9 November – Cashel Arts Fest.
- 10 November – Sligo International Choral Festival.
- 12 November – Bottlenote.
- 16 November – Ardee Baroque Festival.
- 17 November – Irish Burning Man Decompressed.
- 17 November – Seesound – as part of Cork Film Festival.
- 17 November – Dublin Burlesque Festival.
- 21 November – Jazz Is....
- 23 November – What If, Why Not?.
- 30 November – Feile na Soilse.
- 30 November – Drogheda Traditional Music Weekend.
- 30 November – Home Grown Music Festival.

=== December ===
- 15 December – Other Voices.
- 21 December – Winter Solstice Festival.
