= Contrail (song) =

Single by Namie Amuro

from the album Feel
- Released: May 29, 2013
- Recorded: 2013; Daimonion Studios (Shibuya, Tokyo)
- Genre: Electronic
- Length: 4:12
- Label: Dimension Point
- Songwriter: Nao'ymt
- Producer: Nao'ymt

Namie Amuro singles chronology
"Big Boys Cry" (2013)	"Contrail" (2013)	"Tsuki" (2014)

"Contrail" is a song by Japanese recording artist Namie Amuro, taken from her eleventh studio and second Japanese–English bilingual album Feel (2013). The singer was approached by the Tokyo Broadcasting System team to record the official theme song for their television series Flying Public Relations Office, which resulted into the process of "Contrail". The track was written, composed, arranged and produced entirely by long-time collaborator Nao'ymt, and recorded at Daimonion Studios in Shibuya, Tokyo. Musically, "Contrail" is a dance number that includes instrumentation of synthesizers, keyboards and a drum machine. A self-empowerment anthem, the title derives from the literal term, and is delivered as a metaphor for confidence and hope.

The single premiered on May 29, 2013, as the lead single from the album, and her second digital-only release. "Contrail" receive positive reviews from music critics, many who highlighted it as one of the album's best tracks, and complimented the production and songwriting. Although it was unable to chart on Japan's Oricon Singles Chart because of their restriction of digital sales at the time, it did peak at number eight on Billboard's Japan Hot 100 chart. It was certified platinum by the Recording Industry Association of Japan (RIAJ) for digital sales of 250,000 units.

An accompanying music video for the single was shot in downtown Los Angeles, California, at Pershing Square, which featured Amuro walking through the city with children. She has performed "Contrail" on her 2013 Feel concert tour, and two annual Live Style shows in 2014 and 2016–2017. Additionally, Amuro has re-recorded the song in two different versions; a ballad version for her compilation Ballada (2014), and a re-worked version for her final greatest hits album Finally (2017).

== Background and release ==
In March 2013, Japanese network Tokyo Broadcasting System (TBS) approached and asked Amuro if she could record a theme song for their 2013 television series Flying Public Relations Office, which she accepted. Two months later, Japanese music magazine CD Journal confirmed the release of a new single entitled "Contrail", which would be served as a digital-only release. "Contrail" was initially her last tie-in recording with TBS, until she perform the song "Showtime" from Finally five years later. The track was written, composed, arranged and produced entirely by long-time collaborator Nao'ymt. It was recorded by D.O.I. at Daimonion Studios in Shibuya, Tokyo, and mastered by American music engineer Cris Gehringer at Sterling Studios, New York City.

The single premiered on May 29, 2013, as the lead single from Amuro's eleventh studio and second Japanese–English bilingual album Feel (2013). It serves as her second digital-sole single—after "Damage"—and her second overall offering with her label Dimension Point. She contemplated in releasing the single as a CD single, but later scrapped the idea because she felt the digital release and promotion through the television series would be enough. Two cover artworks were published; one features a birds-eye view of two contrails above a cityscape, while the second cover, used for ringtone purchases, features the cast of the accompanying television show.

== Composition ==
"Contrail"
"Contrail" is a mid-tempo dance-pop song that utilizes synthesizers, keyboards, and a drum machine.

Musically, "Contrail" is a "light" mid-tempo dance number that includes instrumentation of synthesizers, keyboards, and a drum machine. However, a member at Japanese website Natalie.mu labelled it amongst many "aggressive" dance tracks on Feel. Patrick St. Michel, writing for The Japan Times, included the track as part of a discussion about the Westernized music influences throughout the entirety of Feel, stating "nearly every track indulges in electronic trends, sometimes besting the American competition." A self-empowerment anthem, the title derives from the literal term, and is delivered as a metaphor for confidence and hope. In an interview with Tokyo Broadcasting System (TBS), Amuro stated that the song represented the "positive views of the world". She furthered explained that "So when I'm listening to the song on Sunday night, I'll wake up on Monday morning feeling happy." Nao'ymt furthered commented to TBS that the song is about looking forward and letting go of the past; he went on to complimented Amuro's "strong" vocals and professionalism. An English language version of "Contrail" was written and recorded as a demo by Nao'ymt and forwarded it to Amuro to record. However, this was replaced by the Japanese version because Amuro felt the majority of the recordings on Feel were "better in English", and that the theme song for the television series was strictly towards the Japanese audiences.

== Reception ==
"Contrail" received positive reviews from music critics. A member from Japanese magazine CD Journal's commended Nao'ymt's production and songwriting, and went on to praise him for "exhausting" the "goodness" out of Amuro's vocal abilities. A generic review at Billboard Japan agreed about Amuro's vocals, and praised the fact it was a single off Feel. Additionally, David Cirone from J-Generation believed "Contrail" stood out from the album due to the fact it was sung in Japanese, stating "Amuro's sometimes at the mercy of heavy-handed, obvious lyrics, and pronunciation occasionally gets the better of her, softening the sharp intelligence she displays in 'Contrail' when she sings in her native Japanese." Similarly, Japanese music retail Recochoku.jp praised the songs message. The 2014 Ballada version also received positive reviews from music critics. Another review with CD Journal complimented Amuro's vocals and the song's background piano composition, claiming it to be "dramatic". In another positive review, staff member's at HMV felt that it was the best ballad on the compilation album.

In Japan, "Contrail" was unable to chart on the Oricon Singles Chart because of their restriction of digital sales. However, it did have success on the Japan Hot 100, provided by Billboard. It debuted at number 44 during the chart week of May 6, due to strong airplay. The track had climbed steadily, eventually reached number 15 during its sixth week of charting on June 10. The following week on June 17, it peaked at number eight for a sole week. It fell outside the top ten the following week, stalling at number 16. Its final appearance at number 42 on the chart date of July 29, staying in the chart for 13 weeks in total. Additionally, "Contrail" debuted on Billboard's Radio Songs, at number 21, and eventually peaked at number seven. The song's final appearance was on June 10, stalling at number 39. On Billboard's Year-End chart, "Contrail" was ranked at number 65. It was certified platinum by the Recording Industry Association of Japan (RIAJ) for digital sales of 250,000 units.

== Music video ==
Namie Amuro and several children in Los Angeles, California for the music video "Contrail".

An accompanying music video was directed by the production team IKIO in downtown Los Angeles, California. The visual was directed a week before the single's initial release date. According to Sync Music Japan, the concept of the video was to invoke a "marching of hope." Additionally, the entire set was situated in specific areas in Los Angeles, and required police from the region to blockade the roads and bridges; this became a heavy topic within the Japanese media at the time. It opens with a birds-eye view shot from the ground, showing several buildings and trees; just before the first verse, a shot of Amuro is seen. The first verse opens with Amuro walking down a street in Los Angeles, singing to the track. During the verse, intercut scenes include various shadows of children holding musical instruments behind Amuro.

The chorus opens with her walking along a bridge with the children playing their instruments behind her. When the second chorus starts, the camera pans over to several buildings and landscapes around Los Angeles. The camera then pans into several citizens in the city expressing a sense of pensiveness: an elderly couple, a man in his car, a couple who have just finished surfing, and a woman walking her dog. During the second chorus, Amuro and the children begin marching and playing their instruments through downtown Los Angeles. The citizens stop for a moment, and look towards the sky, which is cut off screen. As close-up shots of Amuro finish by the end of the bridge section of the song, the camera pans towards rainbow-colored clouds, which makes the citizens become more gleeful.

The final chorus has Amuro and the children dancing and singing at Pershing Square, surrounding by several lighting effects and rainbow-colored clouds. Several scenes of the clouds start to float within the city, above and near skyscrapers, and the video ends with Amuro, the children, and the citizens smiling. The music video received positive reviews from publications. According to Japanese magazine CD Journal, they labelled the content "refreshing", and praised the visual effects. Farea Stadmin from Far East Vibes praised Amuro's introduction to "Americanized multiculturalism", identifying the inclusion of American people as an example. The music video and its "behind the scenes" was included on the DVD and Blu-ray formats to Feel.

== Live performances and promotion ==
"Contrail" has been performed on three concert tours in Asia. Its first appearance was on her 2013 Feel Tour, which was placed as the concert encore; she wore a simple skirt, t-shirt and orange beanie. Additionally, a special bonus track was recorded in Yoyogi Gymnasium on the live DVD/Blu-Ray that commemorated her 500th live performance. A year later, Amuro added the song into her annual Live Style concert tour during the second segment, and as the seventh track in the set list. A live release was published throughout Asia on February 1, 2015. The song's most recent appearance was on her Live Style 2016–2017 as a hidden track to the live releases. Furthermore, the track was used as the theme song to the Tokyo Broadcasting System (TBS) television series Flying Public Relations Office (2014), as mentioned above.

The song has been re-recorded in two different versions on two compilation albums. The first was for her 2014 concept record Ballada, which was placed as a bonus track to the album, and was stripped from its dance production to a pop ballad tune. This version was produced by Nao'ymt, who crafted the original composition. Despite the announcement of having all music videos published on the DVD and Blu-Ray versions, "Contrail" was not added to the list. The song's final re-recording was for her last greatest hits album Finally (2014), which featured new arrangement by Nao'ymt once again.

== Track listing ==
Digital download
No.	Title	Length
1.	"Contrail"	4:14

== Credits and personnel ==
Credits adapted by the liner notes of the Feel album.

Recording

- Recorded at Daimonion Studios, Shibuya, Tokyo (2013).

Personnel

- Namie Amuro – vocals, background vocals
- Nao'ymt – production, composing, arranging, songwriting, programming, vocal production
- D.O.I. – mixing
- IKIOI – music video direction

== Charts ==
=== Weekly charts ===
Chart (2013)	Peak position
Japan Hot 100 Chart (Billboard)	8
Japan Radio Songs Chart (Billboard)	7

=== Year-end chart ===
Chart (2013)	Peak position
Japan Hot 100 Chart (Billboard)	65

== Certification ==
Region	Certification	Certified units/sales
Japan (RIAJ) Digital single	Platinum	250,000^{*}
^{*} Sales figures based on certification alone.

== Release history ==
Region	Date	Format	Label
Japan	May 29, 2013	Digital download	Avex Trax; Dimension Point
Australia	May 29, 2013	Digital download	Avex Music Creative Inc.
New Zealand	May 29, 2013	Digital download	Avex Music Creative Inc.
United Kingdom	May 29, 2013	Digital download	Avex Music Creative Inc.
Germany	May 29, 2013	Digital download	Avex Music Creative Inc.
Ireland	May 29, 2013	Digital download	Avex Music Creative Inc.
France	May 29, 2013	Digital download	Avex Music Creative Inc.
Spain	May 29, 2013	Digital download	Avex Music Creative Inc.
Taiwan	May 29, 2013	Digital download	Avex Music Creative Inc.
United States	May 29, 2013	Digital download	Avex Music Creative Inc.
Canada	May 29, 2013	Digital download	Avex Music Creative Inc.
