= Dakishimetai: Shinjitsu no Monogatari =

- DVD cover
- Directed by: Akihiko Shiota
- Written by: Hiroshi Saito; Akihiko Shiota
- Starring: Keiko Kitagawa; Ryo Nishikido; Yusuke Kamiji; Takumi Saito; Aya Hirayama
- Cinematography: Tokusho Kikumura
- Edited by: Takashi Sato
- Music by: Takatsugu Muramatsu
- Production companies: Tokyo Broadcasting System; Toho; J Storm; Dentsu; Mainichi Broadcasting System; Chubu-Nippon Broadcasting; Happinet; Twins Japan; Hokkaido Broadcasting; RKB Mainichi Broadcasting; Shogakukan; WOWOW; Asahi Shimbun; GyaO; Nippon Shuppan Hanbai
- Distributed by: Toho
- Release date: February 1, 2014 (Japan)
- Running time: 122 minutes
- Country: Japan
- Language: Japanese
- Box office: ¥276,102,650

Dakishimetai: Shinjitsu no Monogatari (Japanese: 抱きしめたい 真実の物語; lit. I Just Wanna Hug You) is a 2014 Japanese biographical romantic drama film directed by Akihiko Shiota and starring Keiko Kitagawa and Ryo Nishikido. It was released in Japan on 1 February 2014. Japanese singer Namie Amuro sung the theme song for the film, "Tsuki". The song was released as a single in January 2014, and was certified Platinum by the Recording Industry Association of Japan.

== Cast ==
- Keiko Kitagawa
- Ryo Nishikido
- Yusuke Kamiji
- Takumi Saito
- Aya Hirayama
- Eriko Sato
- Megumi Sato
- Masataka Kubota
- Jimon Terakado
- Kazue Tsunogae
- Jun Kunimura
- Jun Fubuki

== Reception ==
The film debuted in second place by admissions and has grossed ¥276,102,650 (US$2,716,850). Mark Schilling of The Japan Times gave the film 2 out of 5 stars.
