= Delia Rigal =

Argentinian singer

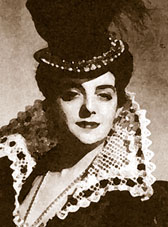

Background information
- Born: Delia Dominfa Mastrarrigo; 6 October 1920; Buenos Aires, Argentina
- Died: 8 May 2013 (aged 92) New York, United States
- Genres: Opera

Delia Rigal is the stage name of Delia Dominga Mastrarrigo (October 6, 1920 – May 8, 2013), an Argentine soprano who performed at the Teatro Colón in Buenos Aires in the period 1943 to 1955, La Scala in Milan and the Metropolitan Opera in New York, where she sang for seven consecutive seasons, beginning with Rudolf Bing's debut as director in 1950.

== Biography ==
A dramatic soprano spinto and a disciple of Rosalina Crocco, she debuted on June 20, 1942 at the Teatro Colón, at age 21. Her main roles were Violetta in La Traviata, Desdemona in Otello and Elizabeth in Don Carlo.

At the Teatro Colón she had already performed in 1941 in a small role in Lohengrin, continuing with Diana in Iphigenie that same season. The following year she was part of the second cast of La Traviata and Simon Boccanegra and in 1944 she created the Empress Augusta in Héctor Panizza's opera Byzantium, who also premiered Aurora in 1945. Between 1945 and 1955 it was Armida, Rezia, Manon Lescaut, Iphigénie in Tauride, Aida, Leonora, Alcestes, Countess Almaviva, Thais, Tosca, Maddalena and Fiora. She sang at the Teatro alla Scala in Milan, the Opéra in Paris, Havana, the Municipal Theater of Chile, the Teatro Solís in Uruguay.

Elizabeth in Don Carlo was the role of her debut in the Metropolitan in New York in 1950 and with whom she said goodbye in April 1957. In that house (and on tours with the company) she sang more than 100 performances such as Nedda, Tosca, Aida, Donna Elvira, Condesa Almaviva, Violetta and Leonora. She emigrated for political reasons in 1955, after being displaced from the Colón Theater in September of that year, settling in Long Island, United States.

In 1989 she received the Konex Platinum Award, an important Argentine cultural award.
