= 2013 in Swedish music =

The following is a list of notable events and releases of the year 2013 in Swedish music.

== Events ==
=== June ===
- 27 – The 1st Bråvalla Festival opened near Norrköping (June 27 - 29).

=== July ===
- 11 – SommarRock Svedala started (July 11 – 13).

== Album and singles releases ==
=== April ===
- 12 – Still Life with Eggplant by Motorpsycho and Reine Fiske.

=== October ===
- 9 – Provenance by Anders Jormin and Christian Jormin (Footprint Records).

=== Unknown date ===
#

G –

== See also ==
- Sweden in the Eurovision Song Contest 2013
- List of number-one singles and albums in Sweden (see 2013 section on page)
