= Cyruĺnia Svietu =

EP by Bristeil
- Released: May 26, 2014
- Recorded: 2013–14
- Studio: Еverest
- Genre: pop rock, indie rock
- Length: 17:07
- Label: self-release

Singles from Cyruĺnia Svietu
- 1. "Heta Mahčyma" Released: December 2, 2013

Professional ratings
Review scores
Source	Rating
Tuzin.fm	5/5 stars
Budzma Belarusians!	9/10 stars

Cyruĺnia Svietu ("The Barbershop of the World" into English) is the first studio EP by Belarusian intelligent rock band Bristeil released on May 26, 2014. The first track "Heta Mahčyma" was released as a single on December 2, 2013. All four tracks were written by Aleh Vial in the Belarusian language.

== Background and release ==
At its third appearance at the annual "Acoustic of Spring" event on March 1, 2013, the band Hair Peace Salon showed some new stuff that would be released under Bristeil's band copyright on the Cyruĺnia Svietu EP later on: the new song in Belarusian "Nieba Abraz" and a cover of Lana Del Rey's "Video Games". The "Nieba Abraz" song was performed live by Hair Peace Salon on March 31, 2013, during the joint-concert together with Clover Club at the "TNT" Minsk club again.

The first song "Heta Mahčyma" of the new Aleh Vial's music project was presented on the European Radio for Belarus on December 2, 2013. There was the music debut of his new band Bristeil. The full EP was released through digital distribution platforms a half of the year later. Bristeil's frontman Aleh Vial called the EP a tribute to Hair Peace Salon.

Two of four tracks on this EP are Belarusian covers: "Videa Huĺni" on Lana Del Rey hit song "Video Games", "Pa-za Časam" on the song "Out of Time" from the Gentleman album by Hair Peace Salon.

== Reception ==
Cyruĺnia Svietu received mostly positive reviews. This first EP helped the band to receive the "Opening of the Year" nomination by the Belarusian music portal Tuzin.fm in 2014 and attend the "Heroes of the Year" awards show that was held on December 12, 2014.

== Tracklist ==
No.	Title	Length
1.	"Heta Mahčyma"	3:29
2.	"Nieba Abraz"	5:30
3.	"Pa-za Časam" (Hair Peace Salon cover)	3:20
4.	"Videa Huĺni" (Lana Del Rey cover)	4:40
Total length:		17:07

== Credits ==
Bristeil:

- Aleh Vial – lead vocals, guitar.
- Max Bykau – lead guitar, backing vocals.
- Gena “Drop D” Lukashanets – bass.
- Alex “Stepkinz” Stepanovich – drums.

Production:

- Pavel Sinilo, “Everest” studio – mixing and mastering.
- Alena Ramanenka – cover photo.
- Anastasia Tarachanka – design, cover design.
