= Kamen Rider Build the Movie: Be the One =

- Kanji: 劇場版 仮面ライダービルド Be The One
- Revised Hepburn: Gekijōban Kamen Raidā Birudo Bī Za Wan
- Directed by: Kazuya Kamihoriuchi
- Written by: Shogo Muto
- Starring: Atsuhiro Inukai; Eiji Akaso; Kaho Takada; Kouhei Takeda; Yuki Ochi; Zyouji Kokubo; Yukiaki Kiyama; Takashi Fujii; Rena Matsui; Yukari Taki; Kensei Mikami; Yasuyuki Maekawa; Masanobu Katsumura
- Cinematography: Atsushi Uetake
- Edited by: Shōkichi Kaneda
- Music by: Kenji Kawai
- Production companies: Toei Company; TV Asahi; Toei Video; Toei Agency; Bandai
- Distributed by: Toei Company
- Release date: August 4, 2018
- Running time: 66 minutes
- Country: Japan
- Language: Japanese
- Box office: $4.8 million

Kamen Rider Build the Movie: Be the One (劇場版 仮面ライダービルド Be The One, Gekijōban Kamen Raidā Birudo Bī Za Wan) is a 2018 Japanese superhero film, serving as the film adaptation of the 2017-2018 television series Kamen Rider Build, taking place between Episodes 45 and 46 of the TV series and featuring the debut of Kamen Rider Zi-O's titular protagonist.

== Plot ==
Following the civil war's conclusion, Japan's new city-state governors promise a new age of prosperity on their inauguration day. But the new Touto governor Kengo Inō rallies anti-Kamen Rider sentiment with the populace hypnotized into seeing Sento Kiryū as an enemy of the state. The mob chase down Sento as Kamen Rider Build after he saved a boy and his older sister to a stadium, an unaffected Kazumi Sawatari and Gentoku Himuro covering his escape before their capture by the new Hokuto governor Ryōka Saiga as the Scissors Lost Smash. After subduing Misora and Sawa once reaching Nascita, Sento attempts to call Ryūga Banjō who was abducted by the new Seito governor Mitsuomi Gōbara, provoking him into a fight after transforming into the Zebra Lost Smash while revealing himself to be responsible for Kasumi Ogura's death. The fight ends when Inō arrives, with Gōbara infecting a distracted Ryūga.

Sento hacks into a government facility's database to confirm the new governors as Soichi's Kiwami Project teammates before being confronted by Inō. Inō explains he and the other governors are actually members of the Blood Race like Evolt and served as his co-conspirators in manipulating various events as part of their goal of destroying Earth. But Evolt's deviation from their plan forced the governors' hand with their Build Annihilation Plan, a brainwashed Ryūga attacking Sento as Kamen Rider Cross-Z. As Build is defeated, Inō reveals the populace truly consider Kamen Riders as reminders of the civil war's horrors. Ryūga then gives Sento's Hazard Trigger to Inō, using it with his Cobra Lost Fullbottle and Ryūga's Great Cross-Z Dragon to become Kamen Rider Blood while absorbing his kin and Ryūga as Evolto carries the unconscious Sento away.

Once in a safe place, Sento wakes up from a dream of Takumi Katsuragi's memories of the Skywall Disaster where his father Shinobu told him that Ryūga is their ace against the aliens. Evolto belittles Sento while explaining that Inō only needs to Pandora Box to destroy the world, with a despondent Sento walking off before he receives a call from Inō offering to trade Ryūga for the Pandora Box. Sento engages Takumi in a metaphysical debate, his previous self lamenting over failing to honor his father's request as the aliens perverted his research for their schemes. But Sento counters that Project Build allowed them to protect their friends while adamant that Ryūga is essential to Evolto's defeat.

The next day, Sento brings the Pandora Box to the governors with Inō going back on his word while challenging Sento to take Ryūga back by force. Sento accepts as he turns into Build Genius, remaining determined in the losing battle before using the Gold Rabbit Fullbottle's power to extract Ryūga from Blood alongside Blood's kinsmen. Blood ignores the setback while combining the Hazard Trigger with the Pandora Box to destroy the planet at its core. With Kazumi and Gentoku battling Blood's kinsmen after Nariaki Utsumi eventually freed them, Sento notices a restored Ryūga's Silver Dragon Fullbottle and deduces their Fullbottles together can destroy Evolt and his kinsmen. Vernage intervenes to restore Misora and Sawa before merging the two Fullbottles with the Genius Fullbottle into the Cross-ZBuild Can, with Sento unintentionally merging himself and Ryuga into Kamen Rider Cross-ZBuild.

Cross-ZBuild forces Blood back to the surface while Kamen Riders Grease and Rouge destroy the Zebra and Scissors Lost Smash, explaining that Kamen Riders's drive fight for those who can build the future with the alien's death restoring the populace while Evolto gloats over his treacherous subordinates' deserved demise. After the Cross-ZBuild Can defused back into its components, the group are still dismayed at the continued anti-Kamen Rider sentiment though Sento is not bothered as long as those who can build the future after being thanked by the boy he saved earlier.

Sometime later, Sento is researching a means to reproduce a similar combination like Cross-ZBuild to defeat Evolto when he is teleported by the white Pandora panel to a battle between various Kamen Riders and their respective enemies. The monsters are then destroyed by a mysterious Kamen Rider equipping himself with the Build Armor, introducing himself to Sento as the apparent demon king Kamen Rider Zi-O.

== Cast ==
- Sento Kiryū (桐生 戦兎, Kiryū Sento): Atsuhiro Inukai (犬飼 貴丈, Inukai Atsuhiro)
- Ryūga Banjō (万丈 龍我, Banjō Ryūga): Eiji Akaso (赤楚 衛二, Akaso Eiji)
- Misora Isurugi (石動 美空, Isurugi Misora): Kaho Takada (高田 夏帆, Takada Kaho)
- Kazumi Sawatari (猿渡 一海, Sawatari Kazumi): Kouhei Takeda (武田 航平, Takeda Kōhei)
- Nariaki Utsumi (内海 成彰, Utsumi Nariaki): Yuki Ochi (越智 友己, Ochi Yūki)
- Shinobu Katsuragi (葛城 忍, Katsuragi Shinobu): Zyouzi Kokubo (小久保 丈二, Kokubo Jōji)
- Takumi Katsuragi (葛城 巧, Katsuragi Takumi): Yukiaki Kiyama (木山 廉彬, Kiyama Yukiaki)
- Mitsuomi Gōbara (郷原 光臣, Gōbara Mitsuomi): Takashi Fujii (藤井 隆, Fujii Takashi)
- Ryōka Saiga (才賀 涼香, Saiga Ryōka): Rena Matsui (松井 玲奈, Matsui Rena)
- Yū Maihara (舞原 由宇, Maihara Yū): Koharu (呼春)
- Arata Maihara (舞原 新汰, Maihara Arata): Shouki Tsuru (鶴 翔麒, Tsuru Shōki)
- Citizen: Shiihashi Justaway (しいはし ジャスタウェイ, Shiihashi Jasutawei)
- Newscaster: Saemi Ikeda (池田 沙絵美, Ikeda Saemi)
- Weather reporter: Airi Yoshida (吉田 愛梨, Yoshida Airi)
- Reporter: Asami Uchimura (内村 麻美, Uchimura Asami)
- Sawa Takigawa (滝川 紗羽, Takigawa Sawa): Yukari Taki (滝 裕可里, Taki Yukari)
- Gentoku Himuro (氷室 幻徳, Himuro Gentoku): Kensei Mikami (水上 剣星, Mikami Kensei)
- Sōichi Isurugi (石動 惣一, Isurugi Sōichi): Yasuyuki Maekawa (前川 泰之, Maekawa Yasuyuki)
- Kengo Inō (伊能 賢剛, Inō Kengo): Masanobu Katsumura (勝村 政信, Katsumura Masanobu)
- Evolto (エボルト, Eboruto; Voice), Evol Driver Voice: Tetsuo Kanao (金尾 哲夫, Kanao Tetsuo)
- Vernage (ベルナージュ, Berunāju; Voice): Sora Amamiya (雨宮 天, Amamiya Sora)
- Kamen Rider Zi-O (仮面ライダージオウ, Kamen Raidā Jiō; Voice): So Okuno (奥野 壮, Okuno Sō)
- Build Driver Voice: Katsuya Kobayashi (小林 克也, Kobayashi Katsuya)
- Sclash Driver, Crocodile Crack Fullbottle, Cross-Z Magma Knuckle, and Great Cross-Z Dragon Voices: Norio Wakamoto (若本 規夫, Wakamoto Norio)
- Ziku-Driver Equipment Voice: Rikiya Koyama (小山 力也, Koyama Rikiya), Yohei Onishi (大西 洋平, Ōnishi Yōhei)

== Production ==
The film was initially planned to be a zombie film, but was changed after concerns it will be seen as a horror film, thus scaring away audiences.

It was initially planned for all 3 members of the "Blood Tribe" that appeared in the film to become Kamen Riders, but due to budget constraints, it was changed to just the leader.

=== Theme song ===
- "Everlasting Sky"
  - Lyrics: Shōko Fujibayashi
  - Composition: Hidehiro Kawai
  - Arrangement: Keiichi Tomita
  - Artist: Beverly

== Release ==
It was released in Japan on August 4, 2018, in a double billing with Kaitou Sentai Lupinranger VS Keisatsu Sentai Patranger en Film.

DVD and Blu-ray was released on January 9, 2019.

== Reception ==
Kamen Rider Build the Movie: Be the One grossed $4.8 million at the box office despite the competition from Mission: Impossible – Fallout, Incredibles 2 and My Hero Academia: Two Heroes.
