= Sou A Kou =

Award-winning Chinese ink painter

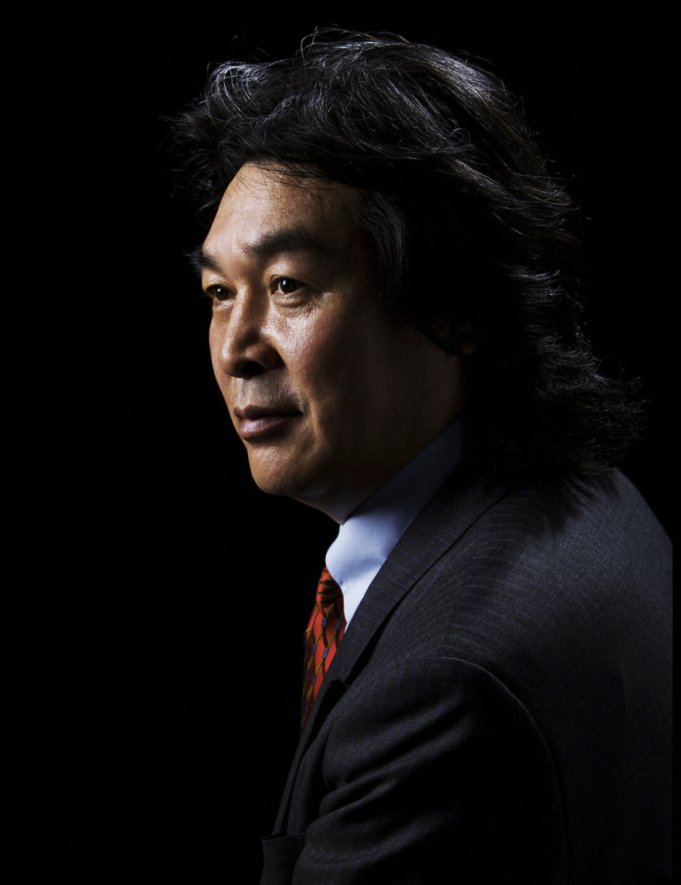
- Style: Ink paint and wash art
- Website: https://sou-art.jp

Sou A Kou (Simplified Chinese: 曹 亜鋼; born 1960, Jilin Province, China) is an ink and wash art painter living in Japan. He is famous for producing hundreds of ink paintings. He has taught over 1500 students and held over 30 exhibitions in his career.

== Life and art ==
In 2003 he was awarded the Japan-China Culture and Art Exchange Contribution Award and the UN World Peace Academy Award in 2005. He held a 30th anniversary exhibition for his life work in 2021 at his Art Academy in Tokyo.

On 20 July 2023, he announced a new collaboration with Tetsuya Komuro to produce an art collection that features music from Komuro, as well as the world's largest ink painting.
