= Old-Fashioned Cupcake =

Japanese manga and TV drama series

- Cover of the Japanese version of vol. 1, released on January 4, 2020

オールドファッションカップケーキ (Ōrudo Fasshon Kappukēki)
- Genre: Boys' love
- Manga
- Written by: Sagan Sagan
- Published by: Taiyoh Tosho
- English publisher: NA: SuBLime
- Imprint: H & C Comics ihr Hertz Series
- Magazine: ihr Hertz
- Original run: January 31, 2019 – present
- Volumes: 2
- Television drama
- Directed by: Ayaka Katō
- Produced by: Hiromi Nemoto; Tsugi Shikanai; Takeshi Katayama; Tomoko Matsuura
- Written by: Takeshi Miyamoto
- Music by: Daisuke Nishimura
- Licensed by: Viki; GagaOOLala
- Original network: Fuji TV
- Original run: June 13, 2022 – July 4, 2022
- Episodes: 5

Old-Fashioned Cupcake (Japanese: オールドファッションカップケーキ, Hepburn: Ōrudo Fasshon Kappukēki) is a Japanese manga series by Sagan Sagan. It has been serialized in the boys' love manga magazine ihr Hertz since January 31, 2019. A live-action television drama adaptation was broadcast from June 13, 2022, to July 4, 2022.

== Plot ==
=== Old-Fashioned Cupcake ===
Soon to be approaching his 40s, 39-year-old Nozue feels his life is at a standstill, and because of his age, he feels he is at a point where he cannot take risks and change his life. As such, he continues to decline promotions at his job and romantic advances from other women. In an attempt to inspire him to move forward, Nozue's 29-year-old subordinate, Togawa, begins taking him to restaurants frequented by women, giving him new first-time experiences at his age. As the two spend more time together on what Togawa has called their "anti-aging experiment", Nozue becomes closer to Togawa while wondering why he is insistent on making him happy. Nozue grows fond of him, but he becomes unsure due to their gender, difference in age, and social standing. One day, Togawa confesses to Nozue that he has loved him ever since he inspired him to have a positive outlook towards life during his job interview. After reflecting, Nozue comes to accept his feelings for Togawa and the two become a couple.

=== Old-Fashioned Cupcake with Cappucino ===
As Nozue and Togawa continue their relationship, Nozue realizes he is afraid of criticism from their peers. After Kakitani, Nozue's friend and co-worker, nearly figures out their relationship, Nozue suggests to Togawa that they put some distance between each other, causing Togawa to become upset. After spending some time apart, Nozue confesses to Kakitani and Kirishima about his relationship with Togawa. Kirishima has Togawa bring Nozue home, allowing them to make up. At the same time, Togawa announces that he is transferring jobs so that he can grow in his career and eventually be on equal standing with Nozue. A few days later, Kirishima encourages Nozue to pursue what is important to him, and Nozue accepts the new changes in his relationships.

== Characters ==
Sanae Nozue (野末草苗)
Voiced by: Kazuyuki Okitsu (drama CD); Portrayed by: Kouhei Takeda
Nozue is a 39-year-old man with a "healing" personality who is approaching his 40s.
Minoru Togawa (外川実)
Voiced by: Yōhei Azakami (drama CD); Portrayed by: Tatsunari Kimura
Togawa is a 29-year-old man who works as a subordinate under Nozue. He is described as reliable and a tsundere.

== Media ==
=== Manga ===
Old-Fashioned Cupcake is written and illustrated by Sagan Sagan. It was serialized in the boys' love manga magazine ihr Hertz from the March 2019 issue released on January 31, 2019 to the March 2020 issue released on January 31, 2020. It was followed up with a sequel titled Old-Fashioned Cupcake with Cappucino, which ran from the July 2020 issue released on May 29, 2020 to the May 2021 issue released on March 31, 2021. A short story titled Old-Fashioned Cupcake with Karaage was serialized in the January 2022 issue released on November 30, 2021. A third series titled Old-Fashioned Cupcake in My Picnic was serialized beginning with the March 2022 issue released on January 31, 2022. The chapters were later released in two bound volumes by Taiyoh Tosho under the H & C Comics ihr Hertz Series imprint.

On August 1, 2022, Viz Media announced that they had licensed the series for North American distribution in English under their SuBLime imprint.

No.	Title	Original release date	English release date
1	Old-Fashioned Cupcake; Ōrudo Fasshon Kappukēki (オールドファッションカップケーキ)	January 4, 2020; 978-4813032472	June 13, 2023; 978-1974734580
2	Old-Fashioned Cupcake with Cappucino; Ōrudo Fasshon Kappukēki with Kapuchīno (オールドファッションカップケーキ with カプチーノ)	May 1, 2021; 978-4813032823	September 12, 2023; 978-1974734597

=== Drama CD ===
Two audio dramas were released by Fifth Avenue on CD, starring Kazuyuki Okitsu as Nozue and Yōhei Azakami as Tagawa. The drama CD adaptation of Old-Fashioned Cupcake was released on August 2, 2020. The drama CD adaptation of Old-Fashioned Cupcake with Cappucino was released on December 22, 2021.

=== Television drama ===
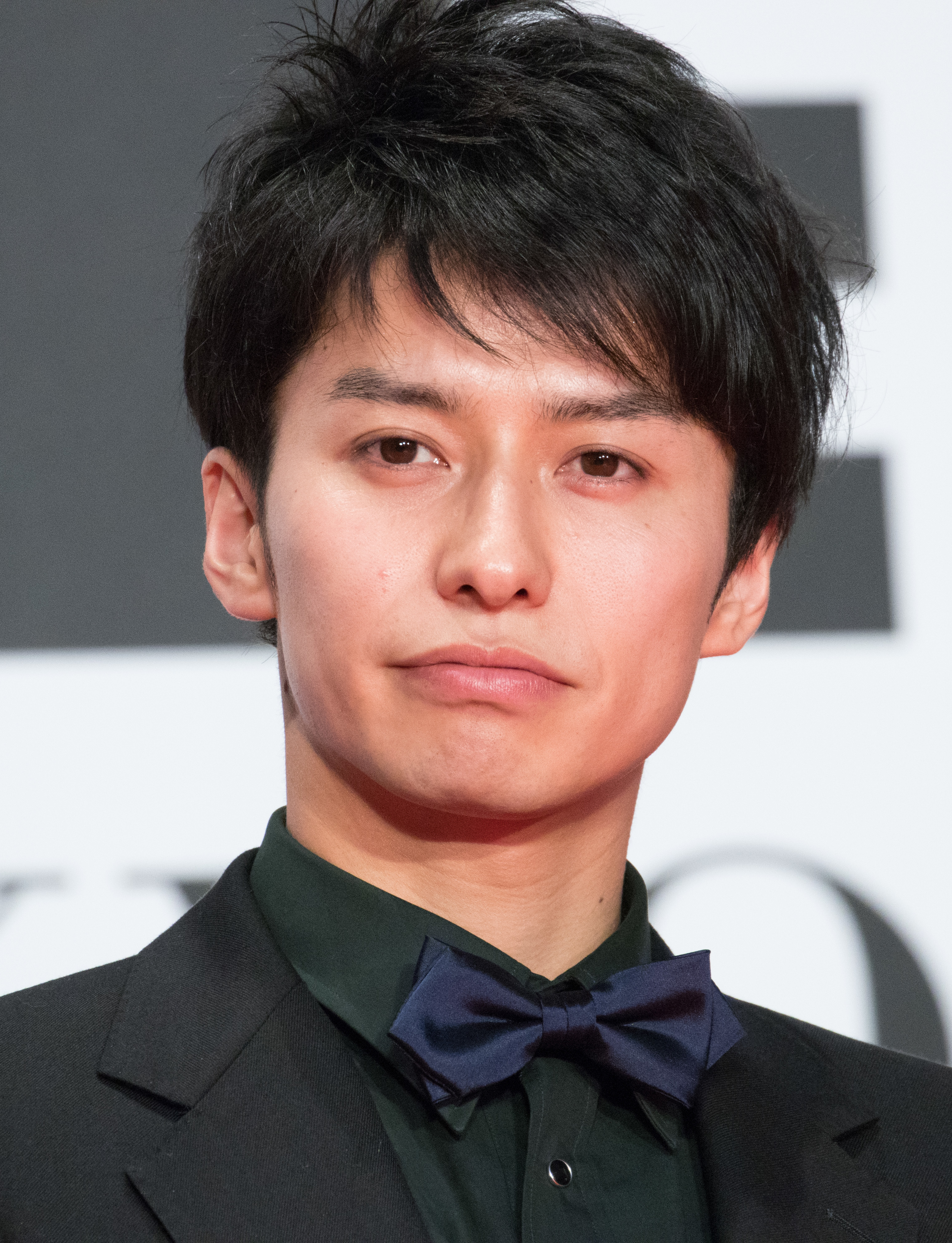
Kouhei Takeda (2016) portrayed Nozue in the television drama

A live-action television drama adaptation of Old-Fashioned Cupcake was announced on May 23, 2022. The drama series was broadcast on Fuji TV on Mondays at 12 AM beginning on June 13, 2022. Simultaneously, it was also distributed through Fuji TV's video streaming service, Fuji TV On Demand, and Rakuten TV, with the first two episodes released on the same day. It was later re-broadcast on Fuji TV on Wednesdays at 12:25 AM beginning on August 17, 2022. (Note: Fuji TV lists the broadcast date as August 16, 2022 at 24:25, which is August 17, 2022 at 12:25 AM.)

The drama series is directed by Ayaka Katō. It stars Kouhei Takeda as Nozue and Tatsunari Kimura as Togawa. The show's theme song is "Blue Blur" (feat. Mabanua) by Ryu Matsuyama. A collaboration music video for the song was released on YouTube featuring footage from Old-Fashioned Cupcake. Behind-the-scenes footage of each episode were also released on Fuji TV On Demand and Rakuten TV, with the short version released beginning on June 20, 2022, and the long version on July 4, 2022.

The drama series was given a home release on Blu-ray and DVD on September 28, 2022. The home release included extras such as a photo booklet, bloopers, and behind-the-scenes footage, as well as a short epilogue drama titled "#ApplePie."

Takeda stated that he was interested in the drama project after his Kamen Rider Build co-stars, Atsuhiro Inukai and Eiji Akaso, had starred in boys' love television dramas (A Man Who Defies the World of BL and Cherry Magic! Thirty Years of Virginity Can Make You a Wizard?! respectively) as well. Kimura prepared for his role by doing muscle training at a gym, and he also stated that, during filming, he had to eat pancakes and drink coffee while talking for eight hours, even on a full stomach.

No.	Title	Directed by	Written by	Original release date
1	"Pancakes Taste Like Regret"; Transliteration: "Pankēki wa Kōkai no Aji" (Japanese: パンケーキは後悔の味)	Ayaka Katō	Takeshi Miyamoto	June 13, 2022
Nozue feels he has reached a point in his life where there is no point of progressing further, as he continues to turn down chances to advance in both his professional and personal lives. He confides this in his 29-year-old subordinate, Togawa, and jokes about being a young girl to feel the excitement of life again. Togawa unexpectedly takes him to a diner, where he has his first experience eating a pancake. Nozue learns he can still have new experiences at his age, while Togawa shares that he has respected him ever since he encouraged him to be positive during his job interview.
2	"A Suit that Looks Good on Him"; Transliteration: "Kare ni Oniai no Sūtsu" (Japanese: 彼にお似合いのスーツ)	Ayaka Katō	Takeshi Miyamoto	June 13, 2022
Nozue and Togawa continue visiting more restaurants for sweets. Nozue starts wearing a 3-piece suit after Togawa compliments how he looks in one, but he becomes troubled over hearing remarks about Togawa's attractiveness as well as how close they have gotten. Togawa becomes jealous when Nozue invites several female co-workers out to lunch, but he learns that he was researching places to eat with him.
3	"Home Cooking and Boys' Talk"; Transliteration: "Teryōri to Bōizu Tōku" (Japanese: 手料理とボーイズトーク)	Ayaka Katō	Takeshi Miyamoto	June 27, 2022
Nozue gets a smartphone, and, as thanks for taking him out to restaurants, he offers to cook for Togawa at home. The two make plans to visit a zoo, but Nozue becomes frustrated when he does not receive a reply on his text. This causes him to avoid Togawa and deliberate over the boundaries between their private and professional relationships. His fever worsens after a drinking party with his co-workers. Once Togawa takes him home and nurses him, he explains that Nozue used a different account to check his messages, revealing why his replies were not appearing. Togawa kisses Nozue while the latter is asleep.
4	"Someone Who I Love So Much I Could Die"; Transliteration: "Shinu Hodo Suki na Hito" (Japanese: 死ぬほど好きな人)	Ayaka Katō	Takeshi Miyamoto	July 4, 2022
Kirishima sets up a group date to help Togawa find a girlfriend, and despite feeling uneasy, Nozue encourages him to go. At the group date, Togawa drinks to a stupor when he gets jealous of Nozue. While spending the evening nursing Togawa back to health, Nozue realizes that however fond he has become of him, there are obstacles surrounding their relationship, such as their gender, age, and social standing. The next morning, Togawa conveys to Nozue about how much he admires and respects him, but before Nozue leaves, he also confesses that he has been in love with him and kisses him.
5	"Two Umbrellas and Feelings that Have Rained Down"; Transliteration: "Ni-hon no Kasa to Furidashita Omoi" (Japanese: 2本の傘と降り出した想い)	Ayaka Katō	Takeshi Miyamoto	July 4, 2022
Fearing rejection from Nozue, Togawa requests that they return to their previously professional relationship, and the two start growing apart. Kirishima offers Nozue a new position in the company, which Togawa learns about during a drinking party. Nozue decides to go home alone, but Togawa gives him one of his spare umbrellas for the rain. This helps Nozue realize how much Togawa cares for him, and he returns to confess his love to him. After this, Nozue and Togawa become a couple and continue to frequent restaurants for sweets again.

== Reception ==
In 2020, Old-Fashioned Cupcake ranked in second place in the comics category of Kono BL ga Yabai! It also ranked in first place for Best Comic in the Chil Chil BL Awards for 2021. In July 2022, the series sold a cumulative total of at least 500,000 physical copies in Japan. The television drama reached no. 1 on Fuji TV On Demand's daily rankings and was ranked no. 1 in popularity for two weeks on Rakuten TV.
