= Koji Yamasaki =

Koji Yamasaki may refer to:

- Koji Yamasaki (baseball) (born 1980), Japanese baseball player
- Koji Yamasaki (field hockey) (born 1996), Japanese field hockey player

== See also ==
- Kōji Yamazaki (born 1961), Japanese general
