= List of Kamen Rider Build episodes =

Kamen Rider Build is a Japanese tokusatsu drama in Toei Company's Kamen Rider series. It is the nineteenth series in the Heisei period run and the twenty-eighth series overall. The series tells the story of a genius physicist with no memories apart from a "bat man" who secretly fights as a Kamen Rider in an alternate-universe Japan, which has been divided into three by the mysterious Pandora's Box artifact and overrun by monsters called Smash. It premiered on TV Asahi on September 3, 2017.

Similar to the previous series, half of each episode's title is an English word, though spelled in katakana instead of English letters, and the other is written in kanji. Also, each episode briefly shows mathematics and/or physics formulas, which forms the episode number.

== Episodes ==
No.	English title Original Japanese title	Directed by	Original release date
1	"The Ones Who Were The Best Match"; Transliteration: "Besuto Matchi na Yatsu-ra" (Japanese: ベストマッチな奴ら)	Ryuta Tasaki	September 3, 2017
Ten years ago, the Mars probe brought back the Pandora Box, which emitted a light that caused the ground to raise, and a massive wall to appear. Society has called this the "Skywall Tragedy". Japan has been separated into three sections, with three capital cities known respectively as Hokuto, Seito, and Touto. They were all in conflict with one another. It is now present day. In Touto, mysterious unidentified lifeforms called the Smash appear. Sento Kiryū secretly transforms into Kamen Rider Build, and he's sent day after day to fight against the Smash. However, Sento has no memories of the last 20 years. He only remembers, "A scientist in a gas mask, human test subjects, and a bat man". What on earth does all of this mean? Sento is employed at the Touto Institute of Advanced Matter Physics. While continuing to fight as Build, he will also be responsible for unraveling the mystery of the Pandora Box as a researcher. It's at this time that Ryūga Banjō makes a jailbreak in the middle of serving a prison sentence for murder. The Smash detected Ryūga and reacted to him. Sento tries to catch Ryūga, but Ryūga tells him an unexpected fact to try to prove his innocence.
2	"Innocent Runaway"; Transliteration: "Mujitsu no Rannawei" (Japanese: 無実のランナウェイ)	Ryuta Tasaki	September 10, 2017
Because Build saved a jail breaking murderer whom he believes is innocent from the Touto government, he is now labeled as a wanted fugitive. At home, Sento listens to Ryūga's situation, which may lead to solving the mystery of his memories. While visiting a scientist, Takumi Katsuragi, who Ryūga was supposed to have killed, the police surrounded the room at the moment when Ryūga discovers Takumi's body. There's a possibility that he was framed. It was supposed to be Ryūga who was unable to reveal anything else, but he suddenly escapes from the base, forcing Sento to go after him...
3	"Borderline of Justice"; Transliteration: "Seigi no Bōdārain" (Japanese: 正義のボーダーライン)	Kazuya Kamihoriuchi	September 17, 2017
Sento and his friends follow the clues regarding Nabeshima, the man responsible for framing Ryūga. When Ryūga contacts Nabeshima, he agrees to protect Nabeshima's family, unaware that a trap is waiting for him.
4	"The Testimony Will Be Zero"; Transliteration: "Shōgen wa Zero ni Naru" (Japanese: 証言はゼロになる)	Kazuya Kamihoriuchi	September 24, 2017
After getting another of his memories back, Sento investigates the connection between Faust's experiments and the Pandora Box. Meanwhile, Ryūga tracks down Nabeshima's family and stands up to protect them from the enemy.
5	"Dangerous Identity"; Transliteration: "Ayaui Aidentitī" (Japanese: 危ういアイデンティティー)	Satoshi Morota	October 1, 2017
While confronting Soichi about his connection with Faust, Sento is informed by Sawa about a hint regarding a person who may know his true identity.
6	"Moonsault of Anger"; Transliteration: "Ikari no Mūnsaruto" (Japanese: 怒りのムーンサルト)	Satoshi Morota	October 8, 2017
Ryūga interferes with Sento's attempt to rescue his friend Tatsuya, intending to use Tatsuya to track down Faust's base. Now Sento not only is forced to fight Tatsuya again to save him, but must confront Ryūga as well.
7	"The Devil's Scientist"; Transliteration: "Akuma no Saientisuto" (Japanese: 悪魔のサイエンティスト)	Shojiro Nakazawa	October 15, 2017
Now suspicious that he may be the responsible for the murder of the scientist Katsuragi, Sento's doubts about his true character increase, unaware that the enemy is closer than he thinks.
8	"Memory Starts to Talk"; Transliteration: "Memorī ga Katarihajimeru" (Japanese: メモリーが語りはじめる)	Shojiro Nakazawa	October 22, 2017
Sento discovers that Katsuragi was the founder of Faust, and approaches his mother to learn more about Katsuragi's intentions, and obtain more clues regarding his lost memories.
9	"The Trap of Project Build"; Transliteration: "Purojekuto Birudo no Wana" (Japanese: プロジェクトビルドの罠)	Kyohei Yamaguchi	October 29, 2017
Sento and Ryūga discover that Katsuragi was involved in creating a Build Driver of his own, and his possible involvement with Sento widens the distrust between them.
10	"Technology of Destruction"; Transliteration: "Metsubō no Tekunorojī" (Japanese: 滅亡のテクノロジー)	Kyohei Yamaguchi	November 12, 2017
Upon learning of Faust's plan to steal the Pandora Box, Sento and Ryūga set out to the Touto Institute to protect it.
11	"Burn, Dragon"; Transliteration: "Moero Doragon" (Japanese: 燃えろドラゴン)	Satoshi Morota	November 19, 2017
Faust stole the Pandora Box and almost all of Sento's Fullbottles. One of his few remaining ones, the Dragon Fullbottle, is proven too strong for his current powers, until he comes with an idea.
12	"Conspiracy Theory"; Transliteration: "Inbō no Seorī" (Japanese: 陰謀のセオリー)	Satoshi Morota	November 26, 2017
After learning from Sawa about the connection between Faust and Nanba Heavy Industries, Sento and Ryūga confront them to retrieve the Pandora Box and their stolen Fullbottles.
13	"Who Takes Off the Veil?"; Transliteration: "Bēru o Nugu no wa Dare?" (Japanese: ベールを脱ぐのは誰？)	Shojiro Nakazawa	December 3, 2017
After learning the truth from Nabeshima once he had regained his memories, Sento confronts Blood Stalk to retrieve the Pandora Box.
14	"The False Kamen Rider"; Transliteration: "Itsuwari no Kamen Raidā" (Japanese: 偽りの仮面ライダー)	Shojiro Nakazawa	December 10, 2017
Sento discovers that Soichi, the man who sheltered him is actually Blood Stalk, leading to a decisive battle between them.
15	"Judge Sento Kiryū!"; Transliteration: "Kiryū Sento o Jajji Shiro!" (Japanese: 桐生戦兎をジャッジしろ！)	Kyohei Yamaguchi	December 17, 2017
Sento retrieved the Pandora Box from Soichi, but the revelation that Night Rogue is Gentoku Himuro makes him realize that now the entire Touto government is his enemy.
16	"The Weaponry Hero"; Transliteration: "Heiki no Hīro" (Japanese: 兵器のヒーロー)	Kyohei Yamaguchi	December 24, 2017
Upon Gentoku's revelation that he and Takumi are the same person, Sento falls into guilt, and a furious Ryūga challenges him to a battle, just when a third, mysterious Kamen Rider appears.
17	"The Outbreak of the Rider Wars"; Transliteration: "Raidā Wōzu Kaisen" (Japanese: ライダーウォーズ開戦)	Shojiro Nakazawa	January 7, 2018
As Touto is invaded by Hokuto, Gentoku asks for Sento and Ryūga's help, and the Riders must decide what to do next.
18	"The Golden Soldier"; Transliteration: "Ōgon no Sorujā" (Japanese: 黄金のソルジャー)	Shojiro Nakazawa	January 14, 2018
Sento confronts Kazumi Sawatari, an assassin from Hokuto, wondering how the enemy got his hands on his latest invention.
19	"The Forbidden Item"; Transliteration: "Kindan no Aitemu" (Japanese: 禁断のアイテム)	Satoshi Morota	January 21, 2018
With he and Ryūga unable to beat Kazumi and his men with their current strength, Sento searches the files left by Takumi to look for an alternative.
20	"Devil's Trigger"; Transliteration: "Akuma no Torigā" (Japanese: 悪魔のトリガー)	Satoshi Morota	January 28, 2018
Soichi approaches Sento and gives him an item that can stop Ryūga's rampage, but using it involves a huge risk.
21	"The Unstoppable Hazard"; Transliteration: "Hazādo wa Tomaranai" (Japanese: ハザードは止まらない)	Kazuya Kamihoriuchi	February 4, 2018
Despite knowing the risks, Sento uses the Hazard Trigger to empower himself against Kazumi's three subordinates. After losing his consciousness and killing one of them, Sento is struck with guilt and refuses to keep fighting, until Soichi gives him an alternative.
22	"Victory of Tears"; Transliteration: "Namida no Bikutorī" (Japanese: 涙のビクトリー)	Kazuya Kamihoriuchi	February 11, 2018
Sento and Kazumi have a duel to settle the war, but when the enemy proves himself too strong for him, Sento has no option but to use the Hazard Trigger again.
23	"The Phantom of the West"; Transliteration: "Nishi no Fantomu" (Japanese: 西のファントム)	Kyohei Yamaguchi	February 18, 2018
Taking advantage of the conflict, Seito invades and conquers Hokuto. Now bent on seizing all of Japan, the Seito forces invade Touto, led by the mysterious Kamen Rider Rogue.
24	"The Man Called Rogue"; Transliteration: "Rōgu to Yobareta Otoko" (Japanese: ローグと呼ばれた男)	Kyohei Yamaguchi	February 25, 2018
Gentoku reappears as Kamen Rider Rogue, determined to get revenge on Touto. To stop him, the other Kamen Riders decide to join forces, when Sento perceives something strange happening with Misora.
25	"The Idol's Awakening"; Transliteration: "Aidoru Kakusei" (Japanese: アイドル覚醒)	Takayuki Shibasaki	March 4, 2018
Just as Gentoku is about to finish off Sento and the others, Misora appears before them, and the secret behind her mysterious powers is revealed.
26	"The Treacherous Deathmatch"; Transliteration: "Uragiri no Desumatchi" (Japanese: 裏切りのデスマッチ)	Takayuki Shibasaki	March 11, 2018
Seito challenges Touto for another proxy battle to end the war once and for all. Sento and his friends make preparations to confront Gentoku and his subordinates, unaware that one among them is a traitor.
27	"The Counterattack Hero"; Transliteration: "Gyakushū no Hīrō" (Japanese: 逆襲のヒーロー)	Ryuta Tasaki	March 18, 2018
The proxy battle to end the war is tied with one victory to each side, and for the decisive bout against Gentoku, Sento unleashes a new power.
28	"The Genius Arrives With a Tank"; Transliteration: "Tensai ga Tanku de Yattekuru" (Japanese: 天才がタンクでやってくる)	Ryuta Tasaki	March 25, 2018
Despite using his new powers, Sento is having a hard time against Gentoku, and Sawa reveals to the others the reasons for her betrayal.
29	"The Opening Bell Rings"; Transliteration: "Kaimaku no Beru ga Naru" (Japanese: 開幕のベルが鳴る)	Kazuya Kamihoriuchi	April 1, 2018
The war between the nations has ended, but Soichi and Namba finally reveal their true intentions as a new conflict begins when they open the Pandora Box.
30	"The Truth of the Pandora Box"; Transliteration: "Pandora Bokkusu no Shinjitsu" (Japanese: パンドラボックスの真実)	Kazuya Kamihoriuchi	April 8, 2018
Vernage, the Queen of Mars possesses the body of Misora to assist the Riders in retrieving the Pandora Box, revealing an important secret about Ryūga in the occasion.
31	"Surge Out, Magma!"; Transliteration: "Hotobashire Maguma!" (Japanese: ほとばしれマグマ！)	Kazuya Kamihoriuchi	April 15, 2018
As the Riders invade the Pandora Tower to retrieve the Pandora Box, a new power bursts from Ryūga, just as questions about his true identity are raised.
32	"A Programmed Tragedy"; Transliteration: "Puroguramu Sareta Higeki" (Japanese: プログラムされた悲劇)	Satoshi Morota	April 22, 2018
Doubtful about his own origins, and eager to know the reason why he was framed in the first place, Ryūga confronts Blood Stalk demanding for answers.
33	"The Final Weapon: Evol"; Transliteration: "Saishū Heiki Eboru" (Japanese: 最終兵器エボル)	Satoshi Morota	April 29, 2018
Touto's Prime Minister, Taizan Himuro is kidnapped, and Blood Stark demands Sento to develop a new driver for him in exchange for his life.
34	"The Best Match is Dissolved"; Transliteration: "Hanarebanare no Besuto Matchi" (Japanese: 離れ離れのベストマッチ)	Takayuki Shibasaki	May 6, 2018
Having attained the power to transform into Kamen Rider Evol, Evolto infects Sento with a poison, threatening his life should he not relinquish the Fullbottles in his possession.
35	"The Tower of Destruction"; Transliteration: "Hametsu no Tawā" (Japanese: 破滅のタワー)	Takayuki Shibasaki	May 13, 2018
Now with Evolto in possession of almost all Fullbottles, the Pandora Box and Ryūga's body, Sento turns to Gentoku for help.
36	"Evolto Hunts Planets"; Transliteration: "Eboruto wa Hoshi o Karu" (Japanese: エボルトは星を狩る)	Ryuta Tasaki	May 20, 2018
Having finally opened the Pandora Box, Evolto almost destroyed the world, should Vernage had not interfered. However, Sento has run out of options, and decides to risk it all in a move to defeat him.
37	"The Ultimate Phase"; Transliteration: "Kyūkyoku no Fēzu" (Japanese: 究極のフェーズ)	Ryuta Tasaki	May 27, 2018
Evolto avoided his destruction by possessing Sento's body. Now unable to transform, Ryūga looks for a way to save his friend.
38	"Mad World"; Transliteration: "Maddo na Sekai" (Japanese: マッドな世界)	Kyohei Yamaguchi	June 3, 2018
Evolto reaches his full potential and seems unstoppable, while Sento recovers his memories as Katsuragi.
39	"The Unstoppable Genius"; Transliteration: "Jīniasu wa Tomaranai" (Japanese: ジーニアスは止まらない)	Kyohei Yamaguchi	June 10, 2018
To face the full power of Evolto and Utsumi, Sento combines the power of all Fullbottles to unleash his most powerful form.
40	"The Final Revolution"; Transliteration: "Shūmatsu no Reboryūshon" (Japanese: 終末のレボリューション)	Satoshi Morota	June 17, 2018
Surprised with the advent of Build's new form, Evolto decides to begin the last steps of his master plan.
41	"The Truth of the Best Match"; Transliteration: "Besuto Matchi no Shinjitsu" (Japanese: ベストマッチの真実)	Satoshi Morota	June 24, 2018
Sento discover that his father is alive, and by searching the files he got from his mother, he learns why the Rabbit and Tank Fullbottles have a special meaning to him.
42	"Legacy of Doubt"; Transliteration: "Giwaku no Regashī" (Japanese: 疑惑のレガシー)	Takayuki Shibasaki	July 1, 2018
With Sento confused with the fact that his father might be in league with Evolto, another person transformed into Kamen Rider Build appears before him.
43	"Another Build"; Transliteration: "Mō Hitori no Birudo" (Japanese: もう一人のビルド)	Takayuki Shibasaki	July 8, 2018
As Sento still tries to figure out his father's true motives, Misora is kidnapped by Evolto and transformed into a Smash.
44	"The End of Evolto"; Transliteration: "Eboruto no Saigo" (Japanese: エボルトの最期)	Kyohei Yamaguchi	July 15, 2018
Kazumi and Gentoku infiltrate Faust's headquarters in Hokuto, but Utsumi appears to face them. Meanwhile, Sento confronts his father.
45	"The Scientist of Hope"; Transliteration: "Kibō no Saientisuto" (Japanese: 希望のサイエンティスト)	Kyohei Yamaguchi	July 22, 2018
Evolto has been defeated, and Shinobu finally reveals his intentions to the Riders. However, little they knew that Evolto had a surprise waiting for them.
46	"An Oath to Be the One"; Transliteration: "Chikai no Bī Za Wan" (Japanese: 誓いのビー・ザ・ワン)	Kazuya Kamihoriuchi	July 29, 2018
With Evolto one step closer from reaching his objective, he challenges Sento and the others for a decisive battle with the destiny of the world at stake.
47	"Zero Degree Flames"; Transliteration: "Zero-do no Honō" (Japanese: ゼロ度の炎)	Kazuya Kamihoriuchi	August 12, 2018
Despite Sento's warnings, Kazumi uses the Blizzard Knuckle to attain a new, powerful form, knowing that he may not survive the transformation.
48	"To a World of Love & Peace"; Transliteration: "Rabu Ando Pīsu no Sekai e" (Japanese: ラブ＆ピースの世界へ)	Takayuki Shibasaki	August 19, 2018
With no time to mourn for Kazumi's death, Sento, Ryūga and Gentoku brace themselves for the final battle against a full-powered Evolto.
49 (Finale)	"The Tomorrow Build Will Create"; Transliteration: "Birudo ga Tsukuru Ashita" (Japanese: ビルドが創る明日)	Takayuki Shibasaki	August 26, 2018
Sento's plan to merge the world with an alternate Earth works, but Ryūga sacrifices himself to bring down Evolto. Willing to rescue his friend, Sento risks it all by confronting Evolto one last time.
