= Yukari Taki =

Japanese actress

- 滝 裕可里
- Born: 14 October 1987 (age 38); Osaka, Osaka Prefecture, Japan
- Occupations: Actress; tarento; fashion model
- Years active: 2001–present
- Spouse: Undisclosed (m. 2019)
- Modeling information
- Height: 161 cm (5 ft 3 in)

Yukari Taki (滝 裕可里, Taki Yukari; born 14 October 1987, in Jūsō, Yodogawa-ku, Osaka) is a Japanese actress and tarento.

== Biography ==
From her elementary to junior high school years she took lessons at the "Carles Vocals & Dance School Osaka School".

Scouted to her current office at the age of 13, and debuting in 2001, she starred in the film Star Light. Also, she was also an exclusive model since the launch of the fashion magazine Love Berry in December of the same year. In the April 2005 issue, she graduated along with Chieko Ochi, Miyuu Sawai, Mizuho Oda, etc.

== Personal life ==
- She has an older brother.
- Her hobby is collecting dolphin goods. When shooting a photo album, she was able to take two shots with a real dolphin and she was very glad. Also, her cameras and photographs are authentic, in which she used in developing films herself, and they are also introduced in her blogs.
- Special skills are swimming, figure skating, and dressing. She learned figure skating from the age of five and practiced well in the rink where Nobunari Oda skated.
- Yu Fujisaki of rock band Negoto, and Aina Yamauchi of Silent Siren, are people she deeply interacts with in the music industry such as their songwriter's universe, and she often participated in their live concerts and music festivals. Also, she gets along with Yurie Midori and Erina Matsui as well, and often appear on their blogs.

She announced her marriage in May 2019.

== Filmography ==
=== Television ===
| Year | Title | Role | Notes | Ref. |
|---|---|---|---|---|
| 2013 | Limit | Haruka Konno | | |
| 2014 | Ultraman Ginga S | Arisa Sugita | | |
| 2016 | Beppinsan | Etsuko Takanishi (Oyama) | Asadora | |
| 2017–18 | Kamen Rider Build | Sawa Takigawa | | |

=== Films ===
| Year | Title | Role | Notes | Ref. |
|---|---|---|---|---|
| 2001 | Star Light | Ikuko Takashina | Lead role | |
| 2002 | Jū Nana-sai | Jimochi Izawa | Lead role | |
| 2016 | The Projects | Kita | | |
| 2018 | Kamen Rider Build: Be the One | Sawa Takigawa | | |
| 2019 | Kamen Rider Build New World: Kamen Rider Cross-Z | Sawa Takigawa | | |
| 2019 | Kamen Rider Buid New World: Kamen Rider Grease | Sawa Takigawa | | |
| 2022 | Ghost Cat Rhapsody | Lady Otoyo | | |

=== Original videos ===
| Year | Title | Role | Notes | Ref. |
|---|---|---|---|---|
| 2011 | Kamen Rider W Returns: Kamen Rider Accel | Aoi Katsuragi | | |

== Bibliography ==
=== Photo albums ===
| Date | Title | Publisher | Photographer | ISBN |
|---|---|---|---|---|
| 14 Dec 2010 | n.T.m.Y.–nice to meet you | Wani Books | Yoshinobu Nemoto | ISBN 978-4847042546 |
