= Gōki Maeda =

Japanese actor (born 1991)

- 前田 公輝
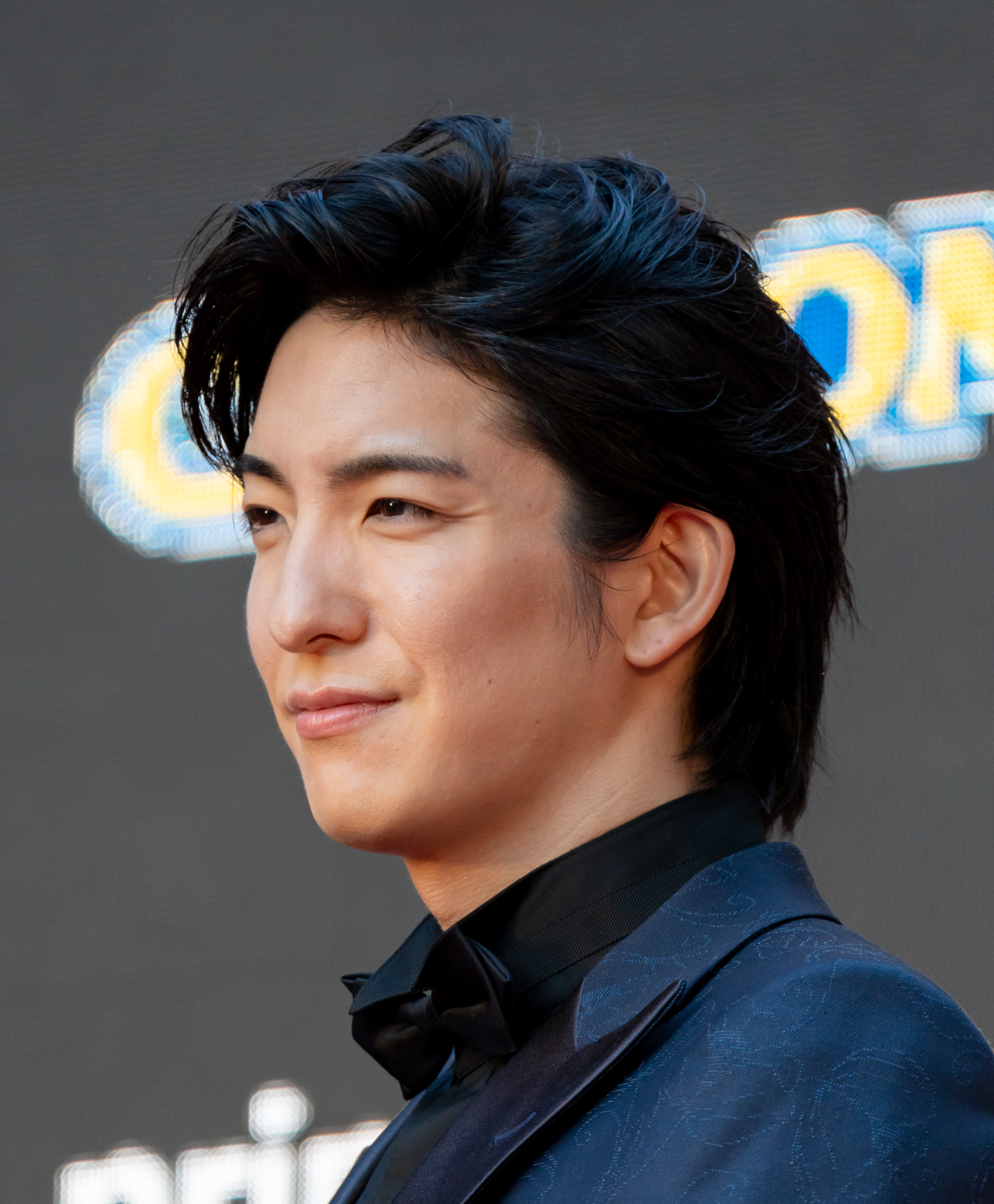
- Maeda in 2023
- Born: 3 April 1991 (age 35); Kanagawa Prefecture, Japan
- Occupation: Actor
- Years active: 1998–present
- Agent: Horipro
- Notable work: Higurashi When They Cry; Byakkotai the Idol

Gōki Maeda (前田 公輝, Maeda Gōki; born 3 April 1991, in Kanagawa Prefecture) is a Japanese actor. He is represented with Horipro.

== Biography ==
In 1997, Maeda joined as a first generation member of the Horipro Improvement Academy. In 2003, he became a Terebi Senshi in the NHK Educational TV series Tensai terebi-kun Max for three years.

In 2007, Maeda moved to Horipro. In 2008, he made his first starring role when he played Keiichi Maebara in the film Higurashi When They Cry. Maeda later played the same role in its sequel Higurashi no Naku Koro ni Chikai in 2009. In 2010, he made his stage debut when he played the leading role in Byakkotai the Idol.

== Filmography ==
=== Television ===
Year	Title	Role	Notes	Ref.
2001	Sawayaka 3-kumi	Haruo Murakami	Lead role	
2015	Death Note	Touta Matsuda		
2016	Mars	Sei Kashino	Episodes 5 to 10	
2022	Chimudondon	Satoru Sunagawa	Asadora	
2022	I Will Be Your Bloom	Kōjirō Iketani		
2023	Sexy Tanaka-san	Kazuki Konishi		

=== Films ===
Year	Title	Role	Notes	Ref.
2009	Slackers: Kizu-darake no yūjō	Gen Ozaki	Lead role	
2014	Torihada: Gekijō-ban 2			
2018	Wish You Were Here	Young Tomiya	Chinese film	
2021	Owari ga Hajimari			
2023	Knuckle Girl	Shun Kamiya	South Korean-Japanese film	
2024	Faceless			
2026	Home Sweet Home	Kotaro Ueki		
2026	Match Monde	Mairu Nikaido		

=== Stage ===
Year	Title	Role	Notes	Ref.
2021	Roméo et Juliette	Benvolio		

=== Variety ===
Year	Title	Notes	Ref.
2003	Tensai terebi-kun Max	Terebi Senshi	
