= Kaho Takada =

Japanese actress

- 高田 夏帆
- Born: 31 May 1996 (age 29); Tokyo, Japan
- Occupations: Actress; tarento
- Years active: 2013–present
- Agent: Production Ogi
- Television: GTO; Omotesandō Kōkō Gasshō-bu!; Toto Neechan; Kamen Rider Build
- Height: 160 cm (5 ft 3 in)
- Website: Official profile

Kaho Takada (高田 夏帆, Takada Kaho; born 31 May 1996 in Tokyo, Japan) is a Japanese actress and tarento who has appeared in a number of television series and variety shows. She is represented by the agency Production Ogi.

In 2014, she won the 31st All-Japan Ninja Championship Tournament. In 2016, she finished the Yokohama Marathon in five hours.

== Filmography ==
=== TV dramas ===
Years	Title	Role	Network	Notes	Ref.
2017–2018	Kamen Rider Build	Misora Isurugi	TV Asahi		
2022	Chimudondon	Sanae Maeda	NHK	Asadora	
2023	Ōoku: The Inner Chambers	Tokugawa Ieharu	NHK	Season 2	

=== TV programmes ===
Years	Title	Network	Notes
2013–2017	R no Hōsoku	NHK	
2015	Dancing Sanma Palace	NTV	
2015	King's Brunch	TBS	Reporter
2016	Yokohama Marathon	TBS	
2017	The Shiro-zeme	NTV	
2017	Tsūkai TV Sukatto Japan	CX	

=== Advertisements ===
Product	Brand
Junon	Shufu to Seikatsu Sha

=== Events ===
Year	Title
2014	31st All-Japan Ninja Championship Tournament

=== Stage ===
Year	Title	Role	Notes	Ref.
2025	Cherry Magic! Thirty Years of Virginity Can Make You a Wizard?!	Nozomi Fujisaki		
