= Sei Andō =

Japanese stage actress

- 安藤聖
- Born: December 25, 1983 (age 42); Tokyo, Japan
- Education: Hosei University
- Occupations: stage actress, actress
- Years active: 1990-present
- Spouses: Hiromasa Matsuda (m. 2011; div. 2015); Masahiko Kawahara (m. 2016)
- Children: 2

Sei Andō (安藤聖, Andō Sei; born. December 25, 1983) is a Japanese stage actress.

== Early life and education ==
Sei was born on December 25, 1983, in Tokyo. She graduated at Hosei University at the school of International Culture.

== Career ==
She debuted in the Japanese version of musical Annie when she was 6.

== Filmography ==
=== Stage plays ===
Year	Play	Role	Ref
1990	Annie	Cynthia	
2015	Akegarasu	Heroine	
2016	Otokotachi		
2016	Call Boy	Ryo's customers	
2016	Macbeth	Lady Macbeth	
2018	Indigo Tomato		
2018	Hai Bai 15th anniversary play		
2018	Sisters		
2019	Kosogiotoshi no Akekure		
2020	Yotaka to Yakei		
2020	Tokyo Shimokita Sunset		
2021	Taitoru, Kyozetsu		
2022	Binbō Monogatari	Kawakami Yoshi	
2022	Biome	Tomoe/Rindo	
2022	Senkou Banashi		
2022	Hakase no Aishita Sūshiki	Watashi	
2024	KAAT Kids Program 2024		

=== Television ===
Year	Series	Role	Ref
2018	The Inugami Curse		
2021	Tōkyō, Ai Dano, Koi Dano	Tada Misaki	
2023	Fūfu ga Kowareru Toki	Tomomi	
2024	Metsusou mo Nai		
2024	Atarashii Kawai		

=== Films ===
Year	Film	Role	Ref
2020	Sora wa Doko ni Aru	Miki	
2022	Dōnatsu Kori	Costumer	
2023	Ikitete Gomen'nasai		
2023	Sāchiraito - Yūsei Sanpo -	Takako	
2023	Hold Your Hand	Sayuri	
2023	Ensha		
2023	Hotsureru		
2025	Yoyogi Johnny		

== Personal life ==
She married Hiromasa Matsuda in April 2011 but divorced in April 2015. She married Masahiko Kawahara, a film director and actor in 2016. She gave birth to twins in 2017.
