= Beverly (singer) =

Japanese singer (born 1994)

Beverly Caimen
- Also known as: Beverly
- Born: June 20, 1994 (age 31); Calamba, Laguna, Philippines
- Genres: R&B; pop
- Occupation: Singer
- Years active: 2013–present
- Labels: GMA; Avex Trax
- Spouse: Unknown (m. 2024)
- Website: avex.jp/beverly/

Beverly Lumbres Caimen (born June 20, 1994), known mononymously as Beverly (ビバリー), is a Filipino pop singer based in Japan under the Avex Trax label. She is known for her various soundtrack appearances, such as "Be the One" in Kamen Rider Build and "Koko" in Pokémon the Movie: Secrets of the Jungle.

== Early life ==
Beverly Caimen was born on June 20, 1994, in Calamba, Laguna, Philippines as the third child to Ramon Vega Caimen and Leticia Valdez Lumbres, having a brother and two other sisters. Beverly began singing at the age of 5 when her mother sent her to school and found out she had a talent for it. She joined her school's choir at the age of 7 and began taking voice lessons at 9 when her mother found time. It was around this time she entered her first singing competition, but she didn't win. Even so, her mother encouraged her to continue as she needed more experience. She graduated from Batangas State University with a B.S. in psychology.

== Personal life ==
Beverly Caimen married her non-celebrity boyfriend on November 5, 2024.

== History ==
Beverly began chasing after her dreams by joining various amateur singing competitions. She won first place at the World Championships of Performing Arts, where she recorded songs under GMA Records and worked with composer Vehnee Saturno; during this time, she released her first and only album with GMA, Beverly Caimen. Beverly received a Best Performance nomination from Awit Awards and won the Harvest of Honors award from the National Commission for Culture and the Arts and the Best Performance award from the A Song of Praise Music Festival Year 3.

Beverly had always loved Japanese music, having watched a lot of anime and Japanese dramas while in the Philippines. She had always wanted to travel to Japan, and when Saturno asked his business partner in Japan to give Beverly's songs a listen, they eventually came to audition her, and she got to do just that.

With Beverly finally in Japan in 2015, she attended singing and dancing workshops and signed with Avex Trax in 2016. At the annual A-Nation event, she was appointed as the 'Shooting Act', the name to look out for, for an up-and-coming artist. The reaction she received was very positive, which lead to her being included in the Disney Magical Pop Christmas album. She also opened for Ariana Grande on her Dangerous Woman Tour on October 10, 2017, at Makuhari Messa.

Beverly's big break came when her song "I Need Your Love" was used in the Fuji TV drama Crisis starring Oguri Shun and Nishijima Hidetoshi. The music video garnered more than five million views and topped download platforms like iTunes and Recochoku in Japan.

Beverly released her debut album, Awesome, on May 31, 2017. It peaked at No. 8 on the Oricon Albums Chart, and is her highest ranking release to date.

Beverly released her second album, 24, on June 20, 2018. It includes the singles "All I Want" and "Love Therapy". The album reached No. 16 on the Oricon Albums Chart and charted for a total of six weeks.

Beverly released her third album, Infinity, on December 4, 2019. It includes the singles "Adventure," "Again," and "Sagashi ni Ikoyo." The album peaked at No. 58 on the Oricon Albums Chart.

She released her fourth Japanese album, From JPN, on June 17, 2022. It's a double album, with one disc containing songs in English and the other disc containing Japanese versions. It peaked at No. 148 on the Oricon Albums Chart.

== Discography ==
=== Albums ===
==== Studio albums ====
Title	Album details	Peak chart positions
Title	Album details	JPN Oricon
Beverly Caimen (Note: Released under her full name, Beverly Caimen, in the Philippines.)	Released: March 30, 2015; Label: GMA Records; Formats: CD, digital download, streaming	–
Awesome	Released: May 31, 2017; Label: Avex Trax; Formats: CD, digital download, streaming	8
24	Released: June 20, 2018; Label: Avex Trax; Formats: CD, digital download, streaming	16
Infinity	Released: December 4, 2019; Label: Avex Trax; Formats: CD, digital download, streaming	58
From JPN	Released: June 17, 2022; Label: Avex Trax; Formats: 2xCD, digital download, streaming	148

==== Mini albums ====
Title	Album details	Peak chart positions
Title	Album details	JPN Oricon
Tell Me Baby	Released: December 28, 2016; Label: Avex Trax; Formats: digital download, streaming	–

=== Singles ===
Title	Year	Album	Peak chart positions
Title	Year	Album	JPN Oricon
"Just Once Again"	2017	Awesome	–
"I Need Your Love"	2017	Awesome	–
"Despacito"	2017	Non-album singles	–
"Xmas with You"	2017	Non-album singles	–
"Be the One" (with Pandora)	2018	Non-album singles	2
"A New Day"	2018	24	40
"All I Want"	2018	24	–
"Baby Don't Cry ~Kamisama ni Fureru Kuchibiru~"	2018	24	–
"Love Therapy"	2018	24	–
"Everlasting Sky"	2018	Infinity	–
"Faces Places"	2018	90s & New Revival	–
"Adventure"	2019	Infinity	–
"Nobela"	2019	Non-album single	–
"Again"	2019	Infinity	–
"Sagashi ni Ikoyo"	2019	Infinity	–
"Endless Love [feat. Sota Hanamura (Da-iCE)]"	2020	Non-album singles	–
"Signal"	2020	Non-album singles	–
"Koko"	2021	From JPN	–
"My Love, Goodbye..."	2021	From JPN	–
"Slay the Day!"	2022	From JPN	–
"Ride Your Way"	2022	From JPN	–
"I Think I Like You"	2022	From JPN	–
"Vows"	2022	From JPN	–
"Never Going Back"	2022	From JPN	–
"Swamp!"	2023	TBA	–
"Andante ni Sunadokei"	2023	TBA	–
"Bumpy"	2023	TBA	–

=== Soundtrack appearances ===
Title	Year	Featured in
"Despacito"	2017	Rank Oukoku
"Be the One"	2018	Kamen Rider Build
"Everlasting Sky"	2018	Kamen Rider Build the Movie: Be the One
"Power of the Dream / Endless Harmony"	2018	Fairy Tail
"Adventure"	2019	Tales of Asteria
"Again"	2019	Fruits Basket
"The Answer" (with William Aoyama)	2019	Astral Chain
"Dark Hero" (female version)	2019	Astral Chain
"Savior" (with William Aoyama)	2019	Astral Chain
"Sagashi ni Ikou yo"	2019	Saga Television
"Can't Stop This!!"	2020	M: Ai Subeki Hito ga Ite
"Signal"	2020	Azur Lane
"Koko"	2020	Pokémon the Movie: Secrets of the Jungle
"Swamp!"	2023	Anata wa Watashi ni Otosaretai
"Andante ni Sunadokei"	2023	Bokura no Shokutaku

=== Compilation appearances ===
Title	Year	Album
"A Whole New World (Aladdin)" (with Satoshi Hayashibe)	2016	Disney Magical Pop Christmas
"As Long as There's Christmas (Beauty and the Beast: The Enchanted Christmas)" (with Saho Aono)	2016	Disney Magical Pop Christmas
"A Dream Is a Wish Your Heart Makes (Cinderella)"	2016	Disney Magical Pop Christmas
"Ai wo Kanjite (Lion King)"	2017	Thank You Disney
"Yume wa Hisoka ni"	2018	Dream2 ~Disney Greatest Songs~
"Hoshi Furu Yoru Ha Dare no Tame -Crazy For You-"	2019	Another Voice -Full Of Harmony Tribute Album-

=== As featured artist ===
Title	Year	Album
"Red" (Keisuka Murakami featuring Beverly)	2017	Beautiful Mind
"Be the One" (Pandora featuring Beverly)	2018	Kamen Rider Build
"Guardian" (Tetsuya Komuro featuring Beverly)	2018	Tetsuya Komuro Archives "K"
"Another Day of Sun" (May J. featuring Miracle Vell Magic & Beverly)	2018	Cinema Song Covers
"Saigo no Piece" (Spicy Chocolate featuring Che'Nelle & Beverly)	2020	Tokyo Heart Beats
"Can't Stop This!!" (Revive 'Em All 2020 featuring Beverly, Faky, FEMM, lol, Yup'in, & Anzai Kalen)	2020	Avex Revival Trax
