= Be the One (Pandora song) =

- CD cover

Single by Pandora featuring Beverly

from the EP Blueprint
- Language: Japanese
- B-side: "Proud of You"
- Released: January 24, 2018
- Studio: Avex Studio Azabu (Tokyo); Universoul 999 Studio (Tokyo)
- Genre: J-pop, EDM
- Length: 3:35
- Label: Avex Trax
- Songwriter(s): Tetsuya Komuro; Daisuke Asakura
- Producer(s): Tetsuya Komuro; Daisuke Asakura

Alternative cover
- CD + DVD cover

Music video
- "Be the One" on YouTube

"Be the One" is the only single by the Japanese electronic music duo Pandora, consisting of Tetsuya Komuro of TM Network and Globe and Daisuke Asakura of Access. It was released on January 24, 2018, by Avex Trax. It features Filipino singer Beverly and was the theme for the TV drama Kamen Rider Build.

The single was released in three editions: a regular version, a version with a DVD, and a version featuring a toy.

The song peaked at No. 2 on both the Oricon Weekly Singles Chart and the Billboard Japan Hot 100. It was later certified Gold for 100,000 downloads.

== Background ==
Pandora was formed by Tetsuya Komuro and Daisuke Asakura in mid-2017. On August 2, 2017, it was announced that they would produce the main theme for Kamen Rider Build, which aired on September 3. It was also revealed that Beverly would serve as the vocalist.

== Promotion and release ==
Ahead of the series' debut, a short music video for the song was released, which featured Pandora and Beverly performing the song in front of an audience. This was also the first time the duo and the singer met face-to-face. On September 16, Pandora held their first live performance at Ultra Japan 2017, which featured the first live performance of the song. The song was later performed again at the Kamen Rider x Super Sentai Live & Show 2018 festival on January 24, 2018, the day the single was released.

The song debuted at No. 23 on the Billboard Japan Hot 100 when it released digitally on January 5. Later, when it released physically, it rose to No. 2. It also debuted at No. 2 on the Oricon Weekly Singles Chart the same week. According to Billboard Japan's Top Singles Sales chart, it sold 40,770 copies that week.

A different mix of the song, along with the B-side, "Proud of You", was later released on the duo's first mini-album, Blueprint. A remix, titled the "'Let's Start Experiment!!' Mix", was released on Beverly's second studio album, 24. Beverly also released an English version in 2020, which was later released on her fourth studio album, From JPN, in 2022.

== Track listing ==
All tracks are written by Tetsuya Komuro and Daisuke Asakura.

CD track listing
No.	Title	Length
1.	"Be the One" (featuring Beverly)	3:35
2.	"Proud of You" (featuring Kamen Rider Girls)	3:40
3.	"Be the One" (featuring Beverly; TV Opening Size)	1:27
4.	"Proud of You" (featuring Kamen Rider Girls; Short Version)	1:46
Total length:		10:28

DVD track listing
No.	Title	Length
1.	"Be the One" (Music Video)
2.	"Tokuten Eizou (特典映像, Bonus Footage)"

Notes

- Tracks 3 and 4 only appear on the regular edition.

== Personnel ==
Credits are adapted from the liner notes.

Pandora

- Tetsuya Komuro – programming, arrangement
- Daisuke Asakura – programming, arrangement

Additional musicians

- Beverly – vocals on "Be the One"
- Kamen Rider Girls – vocals on "Proud of You"

Technical

- Tetsuya Komuro – production
- Daisuke Asakura – production, mixing
- Rena Koyanagi – mastering
- Haruo Yoda – engineering
- Masahiro Kawata – engineering
- Shun Sakakibara – engineering
- Yoshihisa Tokuda – vocal director

== Charts ==
=== Weekly charts ===
Weekly chart performance for "Be the One"
Chart (2018)	Peak position
Japanese Singles (Oricon)	2
Japan Hot 100 (Billboard Japan)	2
Japanese Top Singles Sales (Billboard Japan)	3
Japanese Download Songs (Billboard Japan)	2

=== Monthly chart ===
Monthly chart performance for "Be the One"
Chart (2018)	Position
Japanese Singles (Oricon)	10

=== Year-end charts ===
Year-end chart performance for "Be the One"
Chart (2018)	Position
Japan Hot 100 (Billboard Japan)	61
Japanese Download Songs (Billboard Japan)	21

== Certifications ==
Certifications and sales for "Be the One"
Region	Certification	Certified units/sales
Japan (RIAJ)	Gold	100,000^{*}
^{*} Sales figures based on certification alone.

== Release history ==
Release dates and formats for "Be the One"
Date	Country	Formats	Ref.
January 5, 2018	Worldwide	Digital download	
January 24, 2018	Japan	CD	
January 24, 2018	Japan	CD + DVD	
January 24, 2018	Japan	CD + Toy	
