= Chimudondon =

Japanese television drama series

- Original title: ちむどんどん
- Genre: Drama
- Written by: Daisuke Habara
- Directed by: Takafumi Kimura; Takehiro Matsuzono; Ryohei Nakano
- Starring: Yuina Kuroshima; Yukie Nakama; Nao Omori; Ryo Ryusei; Haruna Kawaguchi; Moka Kamishiraishi; Hio Miyazawa; Yuki Yamada; Goki Maeda; Kazuhiro Yamaji; Kaho Takada; Hairi Katagiri; Kenjiro Ishimaru; Masanobu Takashima; Tsurutaro Kataoka; Mieko Harada
- Narrated by: Jon Kabira
- Opening theme: "Sansan" by Daichi Miura
- Composers: Keiichi Okabe; Ryuichi Takada; Keigo Hoashi
- Country of origin: Japan
- Original language: Japanese
- No. of episodes: 125

Production
- Executive producer: Shunsuke Kawaguchi
- Producers: Yukako Takahashi; Yasunori Matsuda
- Running time: 15 minutes
- Production company: NHK

Original release
- Network: NHK
- Release: April 11 – September 30, 2022

Chimudondon (ちむどんどん) is a Japanese television drama series and the 106th Asadora series, following Come Come Everybody. It premiered on April 11, 2022, and concluded on September 30, 2022.

== Cast ==
=== Higa's family ===
- Yuina Kuroshima as Nobuko Higa
  - Kurumi Inagaki as young Nobuko
- Yukie Nakama as Yūko Higa, Nobuko's mother
- Nao Omori as Kenzō Higa, Nobuko's father
- Ryo Ryusei as Kenshū Higa, Nobuko's brother
  - Daiji Asakawa as young Kenshū
- Haruna Kawaguchi as Ryōko Higa, Nobuko's eldest sister
  - Kino Tsuchiya as young Ryōko
- Moka Kamishirashi as Utako Higa, Nobuko's younger sister
  - Aio Fuse as young Utako

=== Okinawa people ===
- Hio Miyazawa as Kazuhiko Aoyagi, Nobuko's childhood friend and newspaper reporter
  - Kanau Tanaka as young Kazuhiko
- Yuki Yamada as Hiroo Ishikawa, Ryōko's friend
- Gōki Maeda as Satoru Sunagawa, tofu shop owner's son
- Kazuhiro Yamaji as Zenichi Maeda, village only shop's owner
- Kaho Takada as Sanae Maeda, Zenichi's daughter
- Hairi Katagiri as Kyōko Shimoji, Nobuko's high school music teacher
- Kenjiro Ishimaru as Kenichi Higa, Nobuko's relative
- Daichi Watanabe as Kingo Kina
- Hitomi-kyan as Aunt Aragaki
- Michiko Ameku as Aunt Amuro
- Shigeyuki Totsugi as Fumihiko Aoyagi, Kazuhiko's father

=== Tokyo people ===
- Kai Inowaki as Nobuko's senior working at Italian restaurant
- Marie Iitoyo as Ai Ōno, Kazuhiko's colleague and lover
- Aimi Satsukawa as Kiyoe Ino
- Takashi Yamanaka as Jinnai Tarashima, Kazuhiko's boss
- Takeo Nakahara as Tomohiro Ino, Kiyoe's father
- Mieko Harada as Fusako Ōshiro, Italian restaurant owner
- Masanobu Takashima as Kōji Futatsubashi, Italian restaurant head chef and Nobuko's boss

=== Tsurumi people ===
- Tsurutaro Kataoka as Saburō Taira, president of Okinawa Kenjinkai
- Satomi Nagano as Tae Taira, Saburō's wife
- Hayato Fujiki as Junji Kaneshiro, boarding house landlord

Preceded by Come Come Everybody	Asadora; April 11, 2022 – September 30, 2022	Succeeded by Maiagare!
