= Yuki Ochi =

Japanese actor (born 1990)

- 越智 友己
- Born: 1 November 1990 (age 35); Saitama Prefecture, Japan
- Occupation: Actor
- Years active: 2012–2020
- Height: 183 cm (6 ft 0 in)

Yuki Ochi (越智 友己, Ochi Yūki; born 1 November 1990, in Saitama Prefecture) is a Japanese actor. He was represented with the agency Ais. On December 31, 2020, he retired from the entertainment industry.

== Filmography ==
=== Stage ===
Year	Title	Role	Location
2012	Flyd Ball production performance Vol. 2 Gōtō Ginkō –Go To Bank–		Akashi Studio
2012	4th performance of Midori-gumi Bōzu Kitchen		Theater Green Box in Box Theater
2013	5th performance of Midori-gumi Like My Father		Theater Green Base Theater
2013	Yorozuya Kinnosuke-ichiza November Outside Performance The Yorokin × Midori-gumi Gotori		Theater Green Base Theater
2014	Kitamura-jirushi (Ura) Kimamana Ghost ni Goyōjin		Woody Theater Naka Meguro
2014	Haruka: Beyond the Stream of Time 5	Shun Kiryū	Zenrosai Hall / Space Zero
2015	Tokyo One Piece Tower One Piece Live Attraction "Welcome to Tongari Mystery Tour"	Sanji	Tokyo Tower
2016	Cute High Earth Defense Club Love!	Atsushi Kinugawa	Zepp Blue Theater Roppongi
2016	Disgunie Presents the 3rd performance Sin of Sleeping Snow	Sanada Masateru	Zepp Blue Theater Roppongi
2016	Haruka: Beyond the Stream of Time 5: Kazahanaki	Shun Kiryū	Zenrosai Hall / Space Zero
2016	10 Quatre Vol. 12 Ima, Hitotachi: Akō Rōnin-den	Okano Kimonemon Kanehide	Ryogoku Theater X
2017	Ōryū	Kaname Igarashi	CBGK Shibugeki!!
2019	Karakuri Circus: Mayonaka no Circus-hen	Guy Christoph Resh	Shinjuku Face
2019	Akatsuki no Mikado: Akamitori no Ran-hen	Prince Takechi	Shinagawa Prince Hotel Club eX
2019	Karakuri Circus: Deus Ex Machina-hen	Guy Christoph Resh	Shinjuku Face

=== TV dramas ===
Year	Title	Role	Network	Notes	Ref.
2013	Yorozu Uranai-dokoro: Onmyō-ya e Yōkoso		KTV	Final Episode	
2013	Jikken Keiji Totori 2		NHK	Episode 3	
2017	Kamen Rider Build	Nariaki Utsumi / Kamen Rider Mad Rogue	EX		
2019	Kabuki-chō Bengonin Rinka	Shinji Sakurai	BS TV Tokyo	Episode 8	

=== Films ===
Year	Title	Role	Notes
2013	It All Began When I Met You		
2014	Starting Over		Published at the 27th Tokyo International Film Festival
2014	Crows Explode		
2018	Kamen Rider Build the Movie: Be the One	Nariaki Utsumi	

=== Advertisements ===
Year	Product
2013	Kirin Brewery "Natsu no Hyōketsu"
2014	Ezaki Glico "smile.Glico"

=== Music videos ===
Year	Artist	Song	Director
2013	Kōji Kikkawa	"Samurai Rock"	Keishi Ōtomo

=== Internet ===
Year	Title	Role	Website	Notes
2013	Koe-kan Love Message		BeeTV	Episode 7
2014	Kiss×Kiss×Kiss: Last chapter of Love		BeeTV	"3cm no Kiss", "Kenka-go no Kiss"
2018	Kamen Rider Build: Raising the Hazard Level With 7 Best Matches	Nariaki Utsumi / Night Rogue / Hell Bros	Toei Tokusatsu YouTube Official	
