= Yodogawa-ku =

Ward of Osaka, Japan

Coordinates: 34°43′16″N 135°29′12″E

Location of Yodogawa-ku in Osaka City

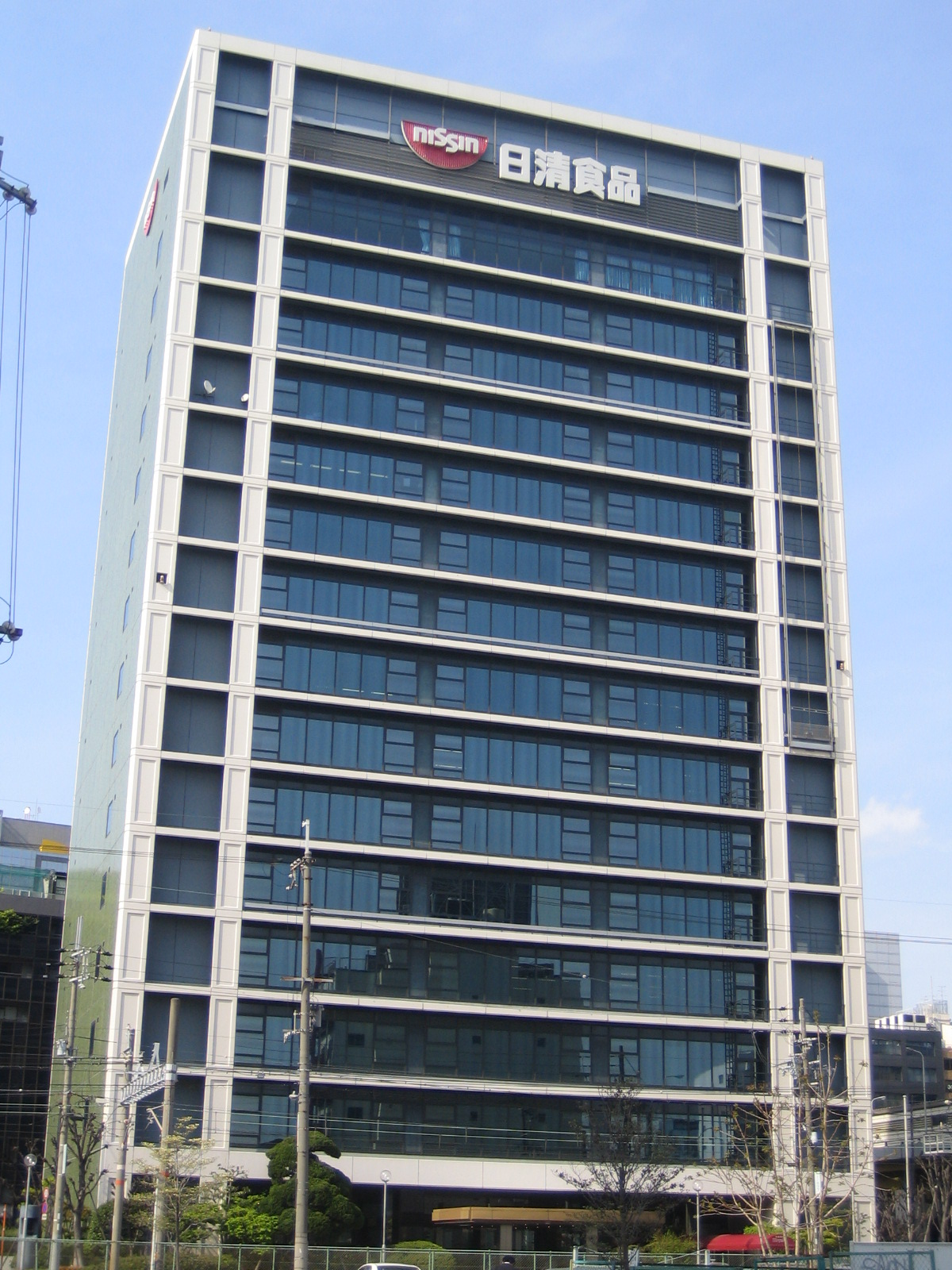
Osaka headquarters of Nissin Foods

Yodogawa (淀川区, Yodogawa-ku) is one of 24 wards of Osaka, Japan. It is located in the north of the city.

== Economy ==
Nissin Foods has had its corporate headquarters in Yodogawa-ku since moving into its new building in 1977.

SNK, a video game company first headquartered near Esaka Station in Suita, relocated to near Shin-Osaka Station in Yodogawa-ku on March 20, 2023.

== Transport ==
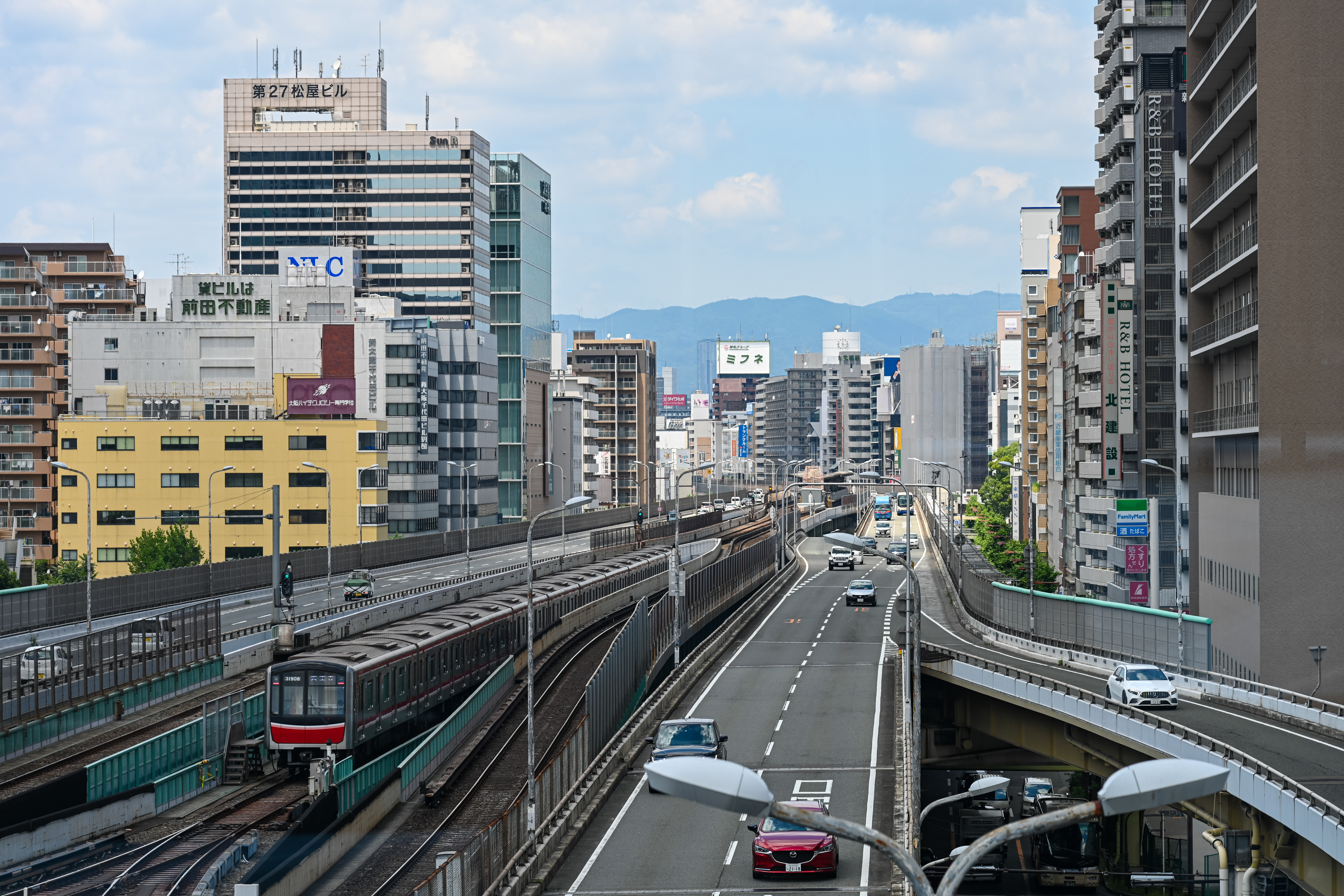
Osaka Metro Midōsuji Line train running between either direction of Shin-Midōsuji (Japan National Route 423)

Railway stations include Shin-Ōsaka Station (New Osaka Station), the terminus of the Tōkaidō Shinkansen which runs to Tokyo and the Sanyō Shinkansen which links to Fukuoka.

== Landmarks ==
The Jūsō area typifies the unique culture of Osaka.

== Education ==
Schools include Kitano High School.

== Politics ==
In 2013, Yodogawa-ku became the first Japanese government area to pass a resolution officially supporting LGBT inclusion, including mandating LGBT sensitivity training for ward staff.

== Notable people ==
- Yukari Taki, Japanese actress and tarento (born in Jūsō)
- Koji Yamasaki, Japanese professional baseball infielder (Tohoku Rakuten Golden Eagles, Nippon Professional Baseball - Pacific League)
- Ryujin Kiyoshi, Japanese singer-songwriter
- Kotaro Omori, Japanese football player (Júbilo Iwata, J2 League)
- Fukutomi Tsuki, Japanese member of South Korean girl group Billlie
