= Jūsō =

Human settlement in Japan

Coordinates: 34.71971°N 135.482755°E

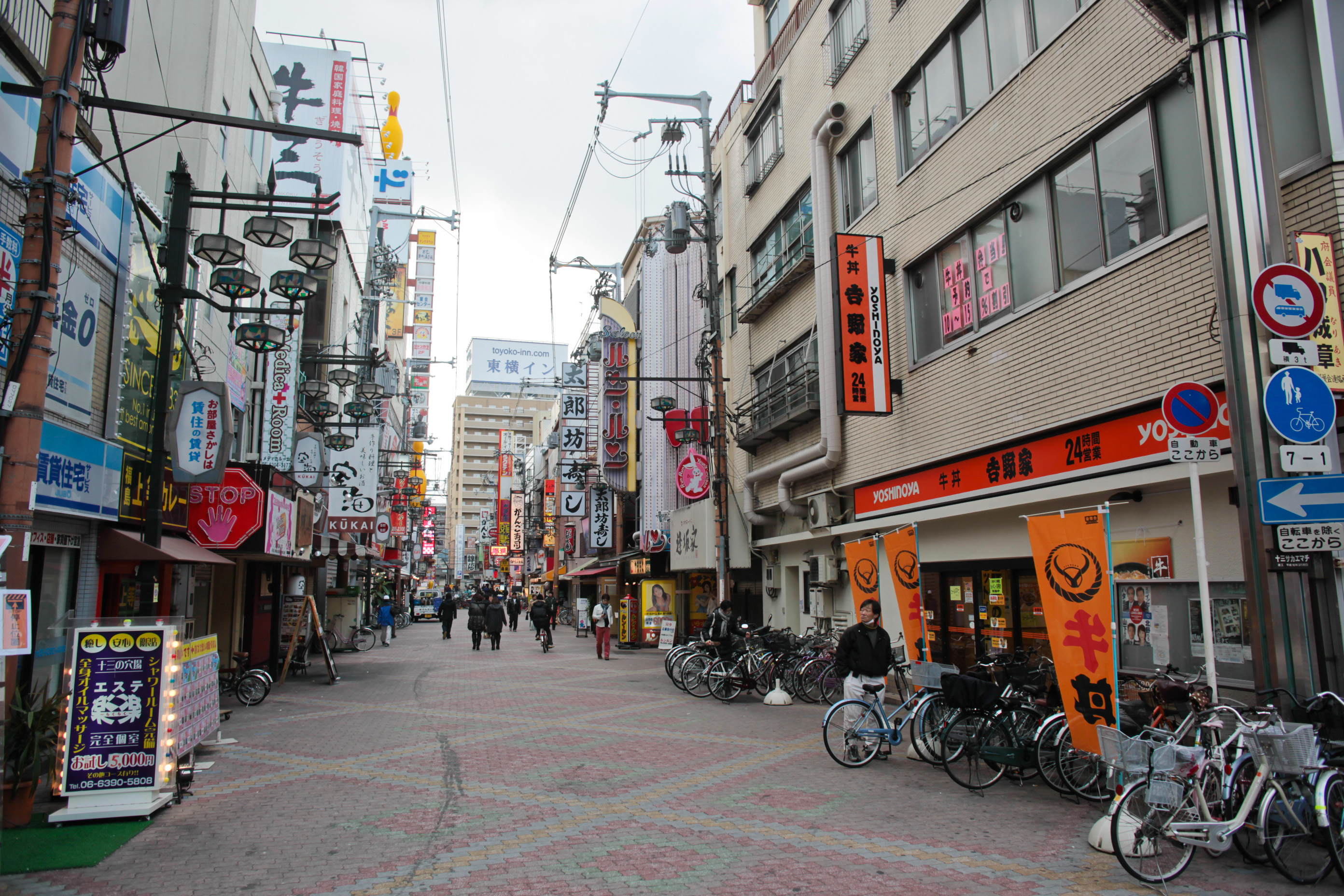
Sakaemachi, Jūsō

Jūsō (十三, lit. "Thirteen") is a residential district surrounding Jūsō Station, in Yodogawa-ku, Osaka, Japan. Known primarily for classic Osaka cuisine, and adjacent nightclub and red light districts, the neighborhood lies to the northeast of Osaka's Kita-ku central business district.

The core of the area is Jūsō Station, the hub station of the Hankyu Railway system. The area typifies the unique culture of Osaka. Situated across the Yodo River from central Osaka, Jūsō is centrally located for easy access by Hankyu Railway lines to other major Kansai cities: 24 minutes to Kobe (Kobe-Sannomiya Station) to the west and 40 minutes to Kyoto (Kawaramachi Station) to the northeast.

Jūsō is well known for a variety of high-quality classic Osaka cuisine including okonomiyaki, negiyaki, and takoyaki shops, as well as a high concentration of nightclubs.

In August every year, a massive fireworks celebration takes place beside the Yodo River; the people who attend this celebration often wear traditional yukatas and wooden sandals.

== Notable people from Jūsō ==
- Yukari Taki, Japanese actress and tarento

== History ==
The name Jūsō is written with the kanji for "thirteen." One theory as the origin of the name states that it was originally the thirteenth stop on the Yodo River going from Kyoto to Osaka Bay. A less popular theory holds that the name originated in numbering under the old jorisei (条里制) land allocation system.

Jūsō Station opened in 1910 as a stop on the Minoo-Arima Electric Railway (now the Hankyu Takarazuka Line).

The area became part of Osaka City in 1925. The Osaka government constructed the Juso Bridge across the Yodogawa River in 1932.

Steven Seagal's aikido dojo, Tenshin Aikido, opened in Juso in 1975 and was the first dojo operated by a foreigner in Japan.

Juso was one of the Osaka locations used in the 1989 Ridley Scott film Black Rain: in the scene shot in Juso, Michael Douglas and Andy Garcia are surrounded by a biker gang while walking to their hotel after dinner in Dōtonbori (despite the fact that Juso and Dotonbori are about seven kilometers apart).
