= Pandora (musical duo) =

Japanese electronic music duo

- Origin: Japan
- Genres: J-pop; EDM
- Years active: 2017–2018; 2025–present
- Labels: Avex Trax; Aldelight
- Members: Tetsuya Komuro; Daisuke Asakura

Pandora is a Japanese electronic music superduo, consisting of Tetsuya Komuro of TM Network and Globe and Daisuke Asakura of Access, formed in 2017.

They received a No. 2 hit with "Be the One", which was the main theme for Kamen Rider Build. The duo was only together for six months before Komuro's retirement forced them to suspend their activities. However, Komuro later resumed his career in 2021, and Pandora reformed in 2025.

== History ==
=== 2017–2018: Formation and initial run ===
Tetsuya Komuro and Daisuke Asakura had worked together for years. Asakura was a support member for Kumoro's band TM Network from 1987 to 1992, and the two had a teacher-apprentice relationship, with Asakura even calling Komuro "sensei". Throughout 2017, pictures of the two together were going around online, which led to speculation they were working together. On July 13, a trailer was uploaded to Komuro's social media pages titled "DA / TK Digital Orchestra", which led to further speculation from both fans and media outlets about a collaboration. Finally, on July 31, Pandora's formation was officially announced, with only the name and a photo of the two being shown off. It was explained that the concept of the group is like a "box", where it's "filled with new entertainment through collaborations with vocalists, art, and technology."

Two days later, on August 2, it was announced they would be providing the main theme for the TV drama Kamen Rider Build, titled "Be the One", which featured Filipino singer Beverly. A short music video was released for the song on August 31, three days before the series' premiere on September 3. They held their first live concert on September 16 at Ultra Japan 2017, which featured the first full performance of "Be the One" with Beverly. They later performed the song again at the Kamen Rider x Super Sentai Live & Show 2018 festival on January 24, 2018, which was the day the single was released physically. The song peaked at No. 2 on both the Oricon Weekly Singles Chart and the Billboard Japan Hot 100.

On January 19, 2018, Komuro announced his retirement after having an affair. Despite that, on January 25, the duo announced their first mini-album, Blueprint, which would feature new mixes of "Be the One" and the B-side, "Proud of You", and also two new songs, "Shining Star" and "Aerodynamics". It was released on February 7 and peaked at No. 9 on the Oricon Weekly Albums Chart and No. 12 on the Billboard Japan Hot Albums chart. The duo played two Billboard Live shows, one in Tokyo on January 26 and one in Osaka on February 3; the Osaka show would be both Pandora's and Komuro's last live performance at the time. The duo made their first television appearance, and last appearance overall at the time, on February 6 on Uta-Con. After that, the duo stopped activities.

=== 2025–present: Reformation ===
Komuro officially came out of retirement in 2021 but focused his efforts at that time on TM Network, who had reformed, and producing for other artists. Finally, on January 17, 2025, Pandora officially announced a reunion seven years after they disbanded, with their first show, titled Pandora Live 2025 -Open the Box-, being held on February 28 at Zepp DiverCity in Tokyo. On May 28, a Blu-ray of the performance was released, which included the performance of a new song, "336".

== Discography ==
=== Extended plays ===
List of extended plays, with selected chart positions
Title	EP details	Peak chart positions	
Title	EP details	JPN	JPN Hot
Blueprint	Released: February 7, 2018; Label: Avex Trax; Format: CD, CD+DVD, digital download, streaming	9	12

=== Singles ===
List of singles, with selected chart positions and certifications
Title	Year	Peak chart positions		Sales	Certifications	Album
Title	Year	JPN	JPN Hot	Sales	Certifications	Album
"Be the One"	2018	2	2	JPN: 100,000	RIAJ: Gold	Blueprint

=== Videos ===
List of videos, with selected chart positions
Title	Album details	Peak chart positions
Title	Album details	JPN
Pandora Live 2025 -Open the Box-	Released: May 28, 2025; Label: Aldelight; Format: Blu-ray	10
