= Hold Your Hand (film) =

2023 Japanese film

- Official movie poster
- Japanese: この小さな手
- Directed by: Hiroyuki Nakata
- Screenplay by: Yusuke Moriguchi
- Based on: Hold Your Hand by Mamora Goda
- Produced by: Matsushima Sho
- Starring: Kouhei Takeda
- Music by: Rhythm & Note
- Distributed by: Furumo Teremo
- Release date: April 8, 2023 (Japan)
- Running time: 90 minutes
- Country: Japan
- Language: Japanese

Hold Your Hand (Japanese: この小さな手, Hepburn: Kono Chīsana Te; lit. 'This small hands') is a 2023 Japanese drama film starring Kouhei Takeda and directed by Hiroyuki Nakata based on the manga written by Mamora Goda and illustrated by Hiroshi Yoshida.

== Plot ==
Kazuma Yoshimura has managed to make a living as a professional illustrator, and has eloped to Tokyo, where he lives with his wife, Sayuri, and their 3-year-old daughter, Hina.

One rainy night, Sayuri goes shopping, slips and falls down a cliff, and is hospitalized unconscious. Kazuma, who had been drinking for entertainment, falls asleep at the izakaya until noon the next day, and when Hina wakes up alone the next morning, she is temporarily placed in a children's home via a child guidance center.

Kazuma goes to a child consultation center, but despite having raised children in the past, Kazuma does not have the confidence to raise a child by himself.He wishes to enroll in a nursery school for a long time, and Natsumi Takahara, a counselor at the child consultation center, also believes that Kazuma does not have the ability to raise children. Since it was determined that there was no such thing, Hina ended up staying at the children's home.

After that, time passes without Sayuri regaining consciousness, and Kazuma gradually becomes desperate, but eventually he finds people watching over him, including the landlord of the apartment, Mr. and Mrs. Hayama, the couple's daughter Maika, and the people at the izakaya he frequents. He realizes that there are people who care for him, and decides to regain the bond he lost with his daughter.

== Casts ==
- Kouhei Takeda as Kazuma
- Koharu Satou as Hina
- Sei Andō as Sayuri

== Manga ==
The original manga series was written by Mamora Goda base on his own experiences after getting arrested in 2013 for assaulting a female assistant. It was illustrated by Hiroshi Yoshida. It began serialization on the 4th edition of the online manga magazine Manga on Web from January 2016 to July 2017. It run for seven chapters and collected into one tankōbon volume.

== Live-action adaptation ==
A live-action adaptation was announced in January 2023. The film was directed by Hiroyuki Nakata and starred by Kouhei Takeda. It was distributed by Furumo Teremo. The film premiered on April 8, 2023, on Eurospace Theater in Shibuya. Karen Aoki sang the opening theme with same title as the film. The film's music was handled by Rhythm & Note.
