= Tetsuya Komuro =

Japanese musician, songwriter and producer

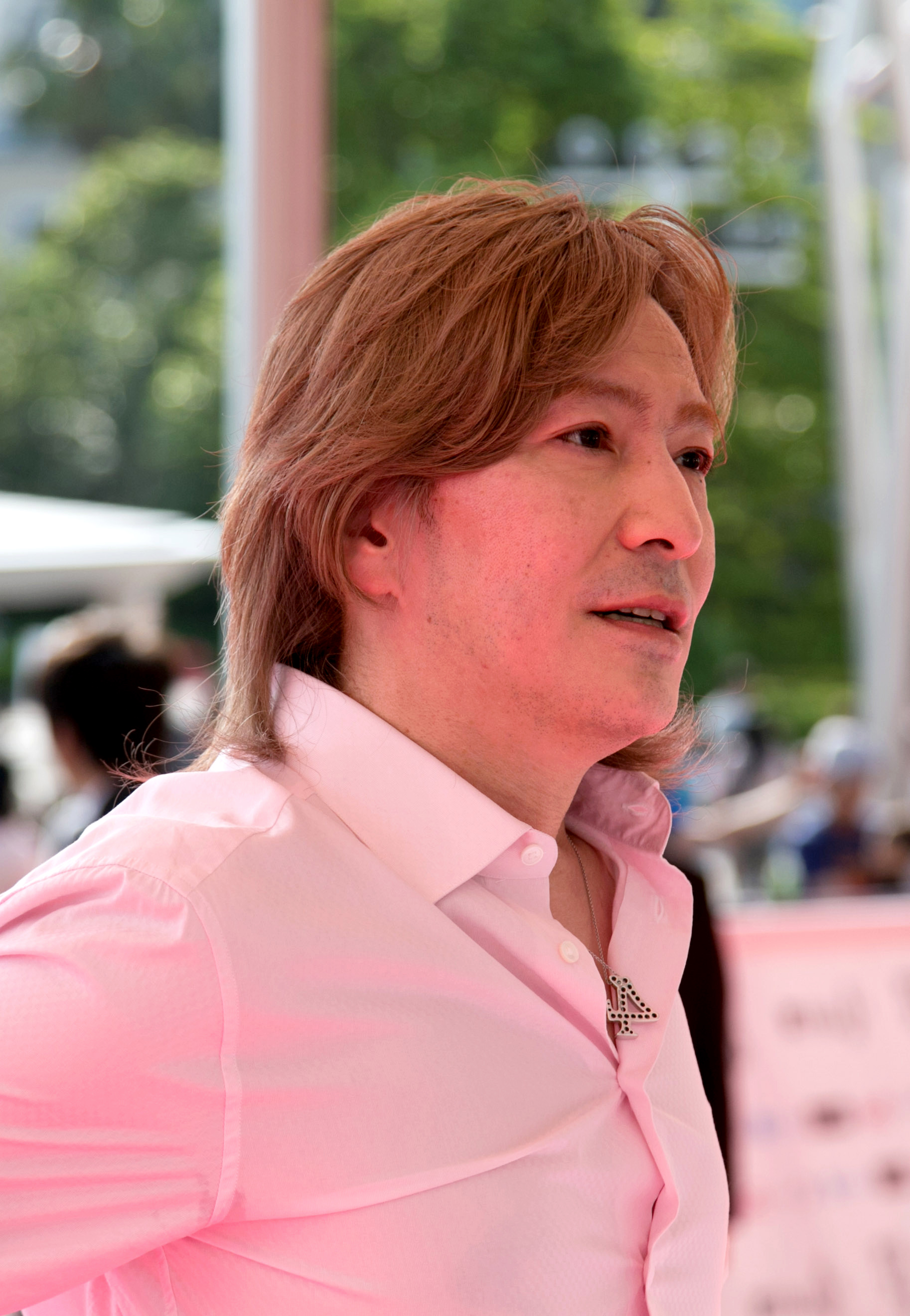
- Komuro in 2014

Background information
- Also known as: "TK"
- Born: November 27, 1958 (age 67); Fuchū, Tokyo, Japan
- Genres: Electronic; Eurobeat; pop; dance; funk
- Occupations: Musician; songwriter; composer; record producer
- Instrument: Keyboards
- Years active: 1975–2018, 2020–present
- Labels: Epic/Sony; SMEJ; Avex; Pioneer LDC; Pony Canyon; Rojam
- Member of: TM Network; Globe; Pandora
- Formerly of: V2

Tetsuya Komuro (小室 哲哉, Komuro Tetsuya; born November 27, 1958) is a Japanese musician, songwriter and record producer. He is recognized as the most successful producer in Japanese music history and has introduced contemporary electronic dance music to the Japanese mainstream. He was also a former owner of the disco Velfarre located in Roppongi, Tokyo.

In the Oricon singles chart of April 1996, he monopolized all the top 5 positions as the songwriter and producer, a world record. In 1995, he monopolized all top 3 positions of the copyright distribution rankings for the JASRAC Award, a record in Japan's music history. At his peak as a record producer the artists he predominantly produced for came to be known as TK Family and at one time included Namie Amuro, hitomi, TRF, Tomomi Kahara and Ami Suzuki amongst others. As of 2008, records produced by him had sold more than 170 million copies, primarily in Japan. Total sales of the singles he has written exceed 42 million copies, making him the fourth best-selling lyricist in Japan.

== Life and career ==
=== 1979–1994: Early career and TM Network ===
His career started as a keyboardist for Speedway in 1979. In 1984, he created the TM Network with Takashi Utsunomiya and Naoto Kine. A year later, in 1985, his first solo work was the soundtrack Vampire Hunter D for the anime movie Vampire Hunter D, and his band, TM Network, did the closing credits song "Your Song". He subsequently composed other soundtracks such as Heaven and Earth and Seven Days War.

As a solo singer, Komuro released singles "Running to Horizon" and "Gravity of Love" in 1989. "Running to Horizon" topped the Oricon charts. "Gravity of Love" also topped the Oricon charts, beating out Seiko Matsuda's "Precious Heart". In 1989 and 1990, Komuro collaborated with Warren Cuccurullo.

As a composer and producer, Komuro wrote a song "My Revolution" for Misato Watanabe. The song received the Golden Award at 28th Japan Record Awards in 1986.

TM Network released single "The Point of Lovers' Night" on July 7, 1990. The single also topped the Oricon weekly charts, beating out Wink's single "Yoru ni Hagurete (Where Were You Last Night)".

TM Network changed its name to TMN in 1990. In 1991, he collaborated with X Japan drummer and pianist Yoshiki as V2. TMN disbanded in 1994.

=== 1994–1997: Success as a record producer ===
By the early 1990s, Komuro was spending much of his time writing songs for and producing many other musicians and bands. He was also an early pioneer of dance music in Japan, and came to stardom in the 1990s as producer with a long string of hits with artists such as TRF (TK Rave Factory), Tomomi Kahala, Namie Amuro, Ami Suzuki, hitomi, Ryoko Shinohara and H Jungle with t. In 1994, he composed the musical score to the Japanese anime film Street Fighter II: The Animated Movie, based on the Capcom video game. Ryōko Shinohara recorded the theme song of the anime film, "Itoshisa to Setsunasa to Kokoro Zuyosa to", with Tetsuya Komuro. The single of the theme song was released on July 21, 1994, and sold over two million copies on Oricon charts. This score was removed from the US release of the film.

He was mainly helped in this task by the mix engineers Pete Hammond and Dave Ford. Both were working for PWL, which was the home of the British producing team Stock Aitken Waterman. Not only that, "TK" is also credited for the rise to fame of Daisuke Asakura, a popular Japanese composer, keyboardist and music producer who began his major musical career as a backup keyboardist for TM Network. Asakura is reported to view Komuro as his "Sensei" or "Teacher".

In 1996, he created dos.

In 1997, he started his overseas career with the remix of the theme music for the soundtrack to the 1997 American film Speed 2: Cruise Control, which Japanese MMA fighter Kazushi Sakuraba and English pro wrestler Johnny Smith later adopted as their entrance music.

=== 1998–2007: Following career ===
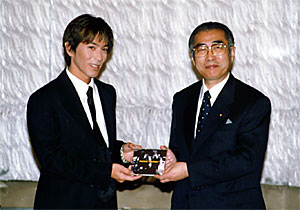
Komuro (left) with Keizō Obuchi at the Prime Minister's Official Residence in October 1999

Komuro also released albums as a solo singer or musician and was involved in the bands Globe, Kiss Destination, and Gaball. On December 31, 1998, Globe's song "Wanna Be A Dreammaker" received the grand prix award at the 40th edition of Japan Record Award. In 1999, Komuro, Utsunomiya, and Kine reunited under their old name of TM Network and remain active to this day.

Komuro worked in collaboration with French keyboardist Jean Michel Jarre from 1998 to 2001. The duet wrote the theme song for the 1998 FIFA World Cup, "Together Now", as well as several other tracks and remixes. He and Jarre also performed a concert on beaches in Okinawa on January 1, 2001.

=== 2008: Fraud ===
On November 4, 2008, Komuro was arrested and charged with fraud, for taking ¥500,000,000 in exchange for a promise to sell to a Hyōgo-based investor the copyright to his songs, which he had already sold to somebody else (which was Avex Group Holdings according to reports). Reportedly, he planned to use the money to pay a portion of his ex-wife's alimony. He admitted the fraud at his trial in January 2009.

In March 2009, Masato Matsuura, president of the Avex Group Holdings, recovered the losses for the plaintiff, paid him extra ¥100 million in compensation and a further ¥48 million in delay damages. Matsuura also stated that Komuro will work at Avex in a company position directly under his control.

On May 11, 2009, Komuro received a suspended three-year prison sentence. According to the sentencing judge, Komuro's acceptance of responsibility and the fact that restitution had been made greatly influenced the final sentence and further went on to state that no good to society would come from Komuro's imprisonment.

=== 2009–2020: Comeback ===
At the Avex Group Holdings' concert tour a-nation 2009, Komuro made a surprise appearance on August 22, 2009. He played a medley of his hit songs at the piano and later reunited on stage with his fellow members of the J-pop group Globe, Marc Panther and his wife Keiko Yamada.

Komuro composed AAA's double A-side single "Aitai Riyū/Dream After Dream (Yume Kara Sameta Yume)". The single was released on May 5, 2010.

He composed almost all the songs on Love Songs, the 2010 album of Japanese pop-star Ayumi Hamasaki. He also composed the 2013 single "Feel The Love" by Ayumi Hamasaki.

In July 2017, he formed the duo Pandora with Daisuke Asakura; they would go on to produce the song "Be the One" with Beverly, which was used in the TV drama Kamen Rider Build.

In January 2018, Komuro announced his retirement from the music industry, following revelations of an affair he had with a nurse who had been taking care of his wife Keiko after her brain surgery.

In July 2020, Komuro once again returned to the industry producing singles for Ayumi Hamasaki and Nogizaka46.

In February 2021, it was reported that Keiko's divorce had been finalized.

In October 2021, Komuro officially announced his return to music full time with TM Network's reformation. Pandora also later reformed in January 2025.

== Discography ==
Studio albums

- Digitalian is Eating Breakfast (December 9, 1989)
- Psychic Entertainment Sound (with Mr. Maric, September 21, 1990)
- Hit Factory (October 21, 1992)
- Piano Voice: TK Piano Works (March 19, 2003)
- Far Eastern Wind – Winter (February 13, 2008)
- Far Eastern Wind – Spring (March 5, 2008)
- Far Eastern Wind – Summer (July 23, 2008)
- Far Eastern Wind – Autumn (September 10, 2008)
- Digitalian is Eating Breakfast 2 (May 4, 2011)
- Digitalian is Eating Breakfast 3 (March 6, 2013)
- EDM Tokyo (April 2, 2014)
- Jobs #1 (March 15, 2017)
- Jazzy Token (July 22, 2022)

Live albums

- Tetsuya Komuro Jungle Massive (July 19, 1995)
- TK-Trap (May 22, 1996)
- Synthesized Trance Vol. 1 (November 20, 2002)
- Synthesized Trance Vol. 2 (February 26, 2003)

Compilation albums

- Saga: Tetsuya Komuro Classic Selection (December 2, 1992)
- TK Million Works (November 16, 1996)
- Arigato 30 Million Copies: Best of TK Works (March 23, 2000)
- TK Works Super Tune: Best Selections (March 19, 2003)
- Piano Globe: Globe Piano Collection (March 19, 2003)
- Piano Wind: TK Ambient Selection (March 19, 2003)
- The Greatest Hits: S (February 22, 2006)
- The Greatest Hits: A (February 22, 2006)
- TK Instrumental Works Selection 1986–2003 (February 22, 2006)
- Komuro Tetsuya Meets Vocaloid (March 28, 2012)

Remix albums

- Blue Fantasy – Love & Chill Out With Trance Remixes (June 21, 2002)
- Cream of J-Pop (July 4, 2007)
- Digitalian is Remixing (March 21, 2012)
- DEBF EDM 2013 Summer (September 25, 2013)

Soundtracks

- Vampire Hunter D (December 21, 1985)
- Seven Days' War (August 5, 1988)
- Heaven and Earth (June 1, 1990)
- Mademoiselle Mozart (December 26, 1991)
- Hatachi no Yakusoku (November 27, 1992)
- Street Fighter II: The Animated Movie (November 21, 1994)
- Hitori ni Shinaide (September 10, 1995)
- Private Actress (November 18, 1998)
- Baober in Love (March 2, 2004)
- Zoids: Fuzors (January 19, 2005)
- Punch Line (2015)
- Sunny: Tsuyoi Kimochi Tsuyoi Ai (August 29, 2018)

Box sets

- TK 1998 (November 26, 1998)
- TK Box: Tetsuya Komuro Hit History (May 31, 2011)
- Far Eastern Wind -Complete- (March 28, 2012)
- Tetsuya Komuro Archives (June 27, 2018)
- Tetsuya Komuro Archives Professional Products (March 27, 2019)

Singles

- "Running to Horizon" (October 28, 1989)
- "Gravity of Love" (November 17, 1989)
- "Christmas Chorus" (December 1, 1989)
- "Heaven and Earth" (April 21, 1990)
- "Eien to Nazukete Daydream" (December 12, 1991)
- "Haitoku no Hitomi ~Eyes of Venus~" (as V2, January 19, 1992)
- "Magic" (October 1, 1992)
- "Pure (Hyper Mix)" (November 27, 1992)
- "Silent Lover" (with C+C Music Factory, April 21, 1995)
- "Speed TK Re-Mix" (July 9, 1997)
- "Call Me Anytime" (with Y.U.M, September 20, 2000)
- "Blue Fantasy – Love & Chill Out" (October 24, 2001)
- "Speed TK Re-Mix: Hono no Koma" (October 24, 2001)
- "Embryo" (with Lifecell, 2003)
- "Someday MF Remix" (January 5, 2006)
- "If You Like It or Not" (February 5, 2006)
- "@Buddha Bar" (March 7, 2006)
- "Someday 2006" (April 22, 2006)
- "Arashiyama" (August 8, 2006)
- "I Want You Back (MF247 Remix)" (October 4, 2006)
- "Angelina (MF Prepromix)" (December 9, 2006)
- "Guts Daze!! (DJ TK Mix)" (April 1, 2007)
- "Now 1" (January 30, 2013)
- "Nijūniseiki e no Kakehashi" (with Kenichi Maeyamada, December 4, 2013)
- "Freedom (Remode)/Love Again (Remode)" (July 8, 2015)
- "#Run" (feat. Sayaka Kanda & Tofubeats, December 23, 2015)
- "Have Dreams!" (with Tsunku feat. May J., April 13, 2016)
- "A New Lease on Life" (May 9, 2016)
- "Blue Ocean" (June 15, 2016)
- "Get Wild 2017 TK Remix" (March 8, 2017)
- "Guardian" (feat. Beverly, June 6, 2018)
- "Running to Horizon (206 Mix)" (April 28, 2021)
- "Trust On Me -Theme of E.T.E-" (feat. Maria, October 16, 2022)
