= Koji Yamasaki (baseball) =

Japanese baseball player (born 1980)

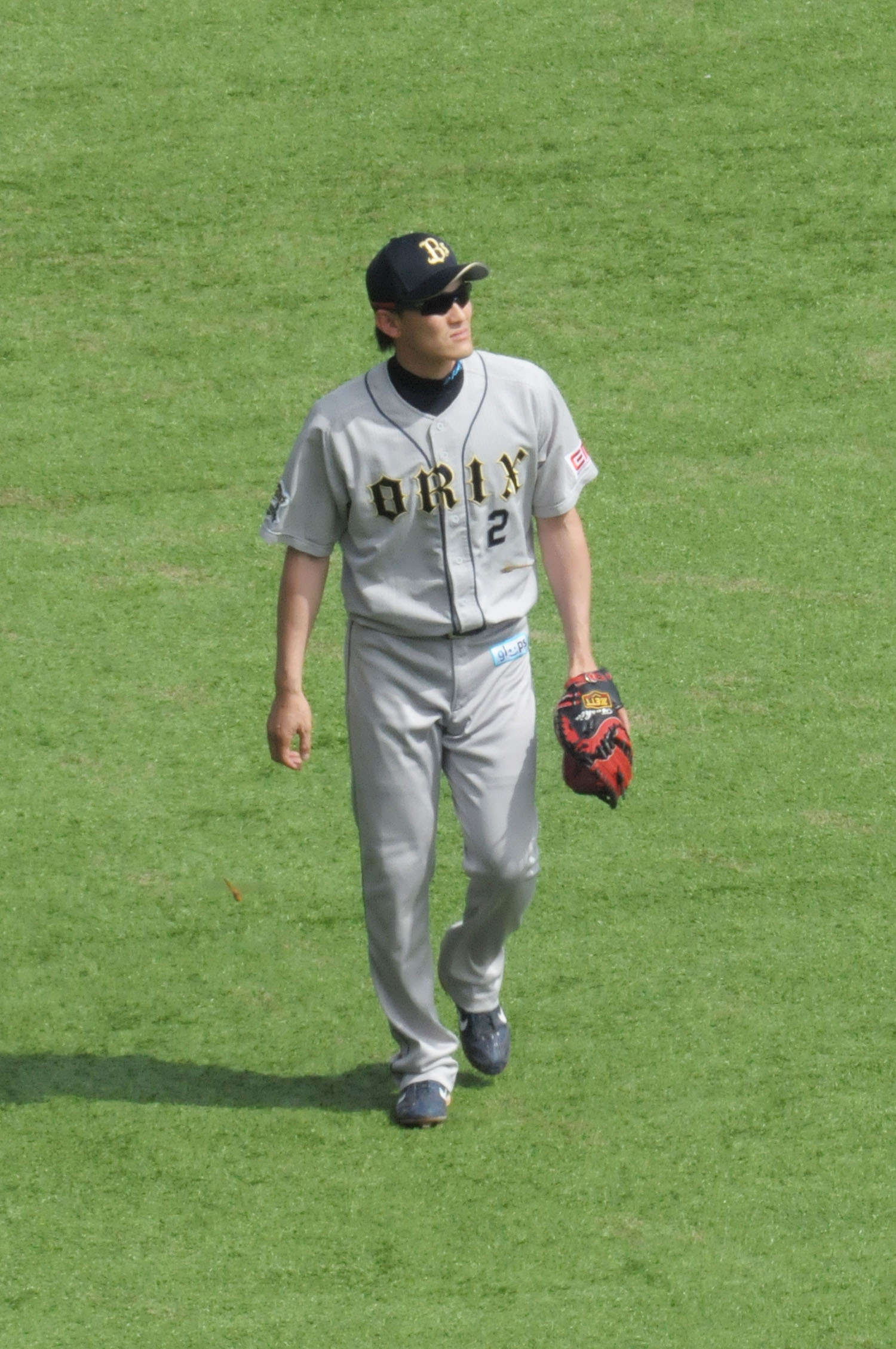
- Yamasaki with the Orix Buffaloes
- Infielder
- Born: October 31, 1980 (age 45); Yodogawa-ku, Osaka, Japan
- Bats: Right Throws: Right

NPB debut
- October 7, 2003, for the Osaka Kintetsu Buffaloes

NPB statistics (through 2015 season)
- Batting average: .222
- Home runs: 8
- RBI: 79
- Stats at Baseball Reference

Teams
- Osaka Kintetsu Buffaloes (1999–2004); Hiroshima Toyo Carp (2005–2008); Orix Buffaloes (2008–2012); Saitama Seibu Lions (2013–2014); Tohoku Rakuten Golden Eagles (2015)

Koji Yamasaki (山﨑 浩司, born October 31, 1980) is a Japanese professional baseball infielder for the Tohoku Rakuten Golden Eagles in Japan's Nippon Professional Baseball.
