= Yokohama Marathon =

Annual running event in Japan

- Date: October
- Location: Yokohama, Japan
- Event type: Road
- Distance: Marathon
- Primary sponsor: JXTG Group
- Established: 1981
- Website: www.yokohamamarathon.jp

The Yokohama Marathon (横浜マラソン, Yokohama Marason) is an annual marathon road running event for men and women over the classic distance of 42.195 kilometres which is held in mid March in the city of Yokohama, Japan.
