= Kouhei Takeda =

Japanese actor, entertainer, and model (born 1986)

- 武田 航平
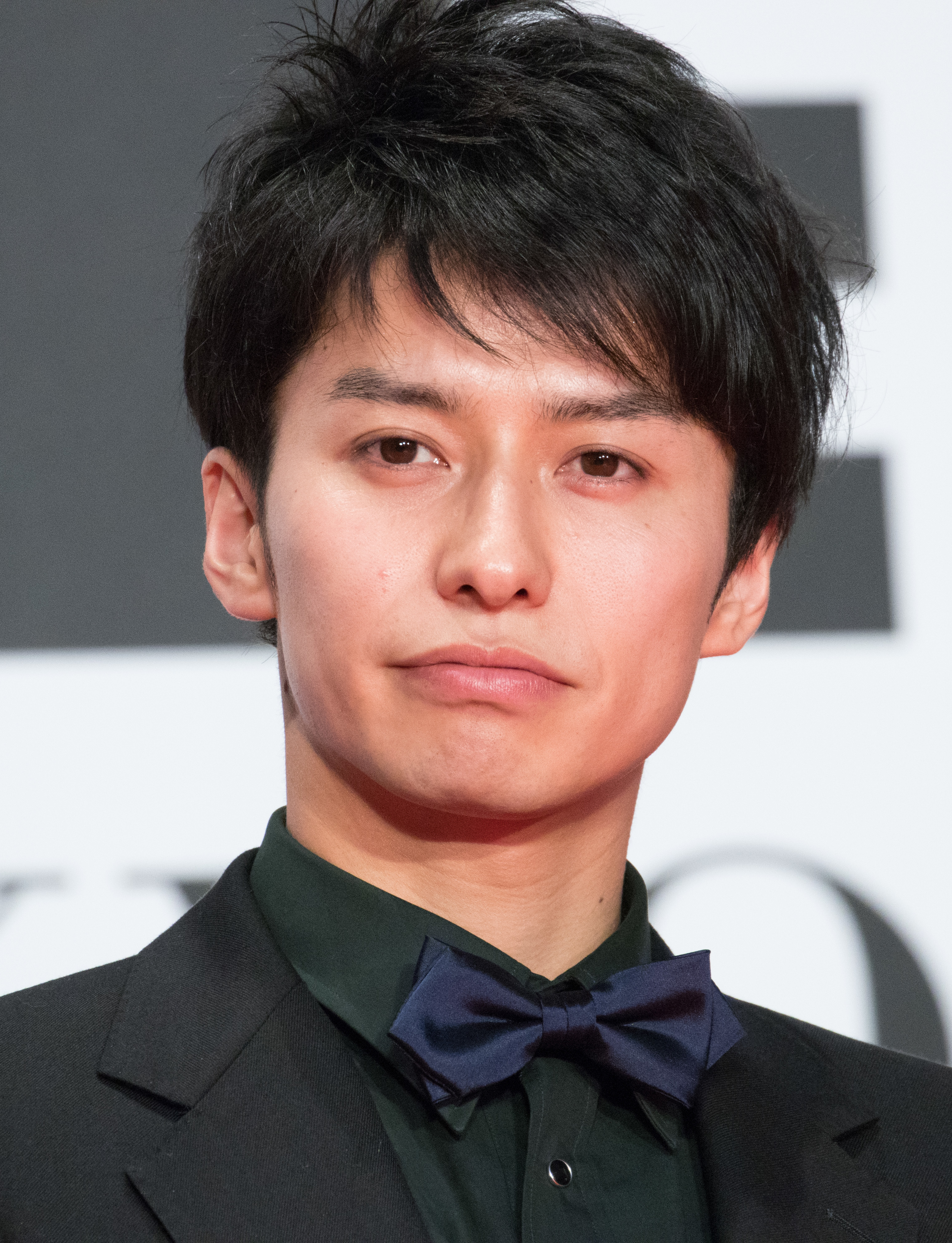
- Takeda at the Opening Ceremony of the Tokyo International Film Festival 2016
- Born: January 14, 1986 (age 40); Tokyo, Japan
- Occupation: Actor
- Years active: 2001–present
- Agent: A.L.C. Atlantis
- Spouse: Mary Matsuyama (m. 2021)
- Musical career
- Genre: J-pop
- Instrument: Vocals
- Formerly of: PureBoys
- Website: www.kouhei-takeda.com

Kouhei Takeda (武田 航平, Takeda Kōhei; born January 14, 1986) is a Japanese actor, entertainer, and model. He is best known for his roles as Kohei Kitahanada in Fuji TV's Hanazakari no Kimitachi e/Ikemen Paradise drama, Otoya Kurenai and Kazumi Sawatari in TV Asahi's tokusatsu series Kamen Rider Kiva and Kamen Rider Build.

== Personal life ==
On January 14, 2021, Takeda and actress Mary Matsuyama jointly announced through their respective social media accounts that they had registered their marriage.

== Filmography ==
=== Film ===
- Tyida (2022), Ryōta
- Hold Your Hand (2023), Kazuma Yoshimura
- Becoming the Sea (2025), Kazuya
- Kingdom 5: The Clash of Souls (2026), Tian Xiao

=== Television ===
- Kamen Rider Kiva (2008), Otoya Kurenai, Masao Kurenai
- Kamen Rider Build (2017), Kazumi Sawatari/Kamen Rider Grease
- Old-Fashioned Cupcake (2022), Nozue
- Between Love and Friendship ver:Rina/ver:Ren (2022)
- Life in smoking blue (2026)

=== Video games ===
- Final Fantasy XII (2006), Vaan
- Final Fantasy Resonance (2026), Vaan
