= Kamen Rider Build =

Japanese drama

- Genre: Tokusatsu; Superhero fiction; Science fiction; Action; Comedy drama; Mystery; Thriller; Conspiracy; Political Drama; Gay romance
- Created by: Shotaro Ishinomori
- Screenplay by: Shogo Muto
- Directed by: Ryuta Tasaki; Kazuya Kamihoriuchi; Satoshi Morota; Shojiro Nakazawa; Kyohei Yamaguchi; Takayuki Shibasaki
- Starring: Atsuhiro Inukai; Eiji Akaso; Kaho Takada; Kouhei Takeda; Yuki Ochi; Yukari Taki; Kensei Mikami; Yasuyuki Maekawa; Akira Hamada
- Voices of: Tetsuo Kanao; Sora Amamiya
- Narrated by: Bucky Koba
- Opening theme: "Be the One" by Pandora feat. Beverly
- Composer: Kenji Kawai
- Country of origin: Japan
- Original language: Japanese
- No. of episodes: 49 (list of episodes)

Production
- Executive producer: Motoi Sasaki (TV Asahi)
- Producers: Chihiro Inoue (TV Asahi); Ayumi Kanno (TV Asahi); Takahito Ōmori (Toei); Toshinari Yanaka (Toei)
- Running time: 20–25 minutes
- Production companies: TV Asahi; Toei Company; Asatsu-DK

Original release
- Network: ANN (TV Asahi)
- Release: September 3, 2017 – August 26, 2018

Related
- Kamen Rider Ex-Aid; Kamen Rider Zi-O

Kamen Rider Build (仮面ライダービルド, Kamen Raidā Birudo) is a Japanese tokusatsu drama and the 28th entry of Toei Company's Kamen Rider metaseries. It is the 19th series to debut during the Heisei era. The show premiered on September 3, 2017, following Kamen Rider Ex-Aid's finale, joining Uchu Sentai Kyuranger and later, Kaitou Sentai Lupinranger VS Keisatsu Sentai Patranger in the Super Hero Time line-up. It is the first series with a science motif.

== Summary ==
A cataclysmic event involving an artifact of an ancient Martian civilization has created a supernatural barrier called the Skywall which separates Japan into three territories, Touto, Hokuto, and Seito. Along with creating a complex power dynamic between the three regions, the event brings waves of monsters called Smash down on the country, who terrorize and attack the citizens.

The protagonist, Sento Kiryu, is an amnesiac taken in by a mysterious cafe owner named Soichi Isurugi who provides him with a belt called the Build Driver that allows him to turn into Kamen Rider Build, which he uses to fight the Smash on his own. Build has different powers determined by the combination of a pair of Fullbottles inserted into the belt, each containing the essences of organic and inorganic matters. Full bottles are obtained by defeating the Smash and absorbing their essence into a Fullbottle and then purifying it.

Throughout the story, Sento learns that his forgotten past is connected to the events of the Skywall Catastrophe, that the Smash is the work of a larger organization attempting to rule the world, and that his allies are not what they seem. In his search for the truth about his past and a solution to the crisis, Sento makes several allies who also gain the ability to transform and fight with him, encounters several nemeses who brutally push back at his attempts to save humanity, and is forced to question who is on what side, and what the sides even are.

== Production ==
The Kamen Rider Build trademark was registered by Toei on May 18, 2017. A press conference was later held on August 1, 2017, to reveal the cast and crew, plot details, the suit and bike of Kamen Rider Build. A trailer was also shown and later released on YouTube later that same day.

=== Suit design ===
The motif of Kamen Rider Build's main form was "rabbit" and "tank". The motif of the form was suggested by Takahito Omori, who found the combination interesting.

One of the villains, Night Rogue, has their suit recolored for Kamen Rider MadRogue, which appeared from episode 38 onwards.

The monsters of the series is called "Smash". They were designed in a way so that their motif are not immediately obvious in order to surprise the audiences when their essence was captured by the main characters after their defeat.

== Episodes ==
Similar to the previous series, half of each episode's title is an English word, though spelled in katakana instead of English letters, and the other is written in kanji. Also, each episode briefly shows mathematics and/or physics formulas, which forms the episode number.

Every episode of the series were written by Shogo Muto.

No.	English title Original Japanese title	Directed by	Original release date
1	"The Ones Who Were The Best Match"; Transliteration: "Besuto Matchi na Yatsu-ra" (Japanese: ベストマッチな奴ら)	Ryuta Tasaki	September 3, 2017
2	"Innocent Runaway"; Transliteration: "Mujitsu no Rannawei" (Japanese: 無実のランナウェイ)	Ryuta Tasaki	September 10, 2017
3	"Borderline of Justice"; Transliteration: "Seigi no Bōdārain" (Japanese: 正義のボーダーライン)	Kazuya Kamihoriuchi	September 17, 2017
4	"The Testimony Will Be Zero"; Transliteration: "Shōgen wa Zero ni Naru" (Japanese: 証言はゼロになる)	Kazuya Kamihoriuchi	September 24, 2017
5	"Dangerous Identity"; Transliteration: "Ayaui Aidentitī" (Japanese: 危ういアイデンティティー)	Satoshi Morota	October 1, 2017
6	"Moonsault of Anger"; Transliteration: "Ikari no Mūnsaruto" (Japanese: 怒りのムーンサルト)	Satoshi Morota	October 8, 2017
7	"The Devil's Scientist"; Transliteration: "Akuma no Saientisuto" (Japanese: 悪魔のサイエンティスト)	Shojiro Nakazawa	October 15, 2017
8	"Memory Starts to Talk"; Transliteration: "Memorī ga Katarihajimeru" (Japanese: メモリーが語りはじめる)	Shojiro Nakazawa	October 22, 2017
9	"The Trap of Project Build"; Transliteration: "Purojekuto Birudo no Wana" (Japanese: プロジェクトビルドの罠)	Kyohei Yamaguchi	October 29, 2017
10	"Technology of Destruction"; Transliteration: "Metsubō no Tekunorojī" (Japanese: 滅亡のテクノロジー)	Kyohei Yamaguchi	November 12, 2017
11	"Burn, Dragon"; Transliteration: "Moero Doragon" (Japanese: 燃えろドラゴン)	Satoshi Morota	November 19, 2017
12	"Conspiracy Theory"; Transliteration: "Inbō no Seorī" (Japanese: 陰謀のセオリー)	Satoshi Morota	November 26, 2017
13	"Who Takes Off the Veil?"; Transliteration: "Bēru o Nugu no wa Dare?" (Japanese: ベールを脱ぐのは誰？)	Shojiro Nakazawa	December 3, 2017
14	"The False Kamen Rider"; Transliteration: "Itsuwari no Kamen Raidā" (Japanese: 偽りの仮面ライダー)	Shojiro Nakazawa	December 10, 2017
15	"Judge Sento Kiryū!"; Transliteration: "Kiryū Sento o Jajji Shiro!" (Japanese: 桐生戦兎をジャッジしろ！)	Kyohei Yamaguchi	December 17, 2017
16	"The Weaponry Hero"; Transliteration: "Heiki no Hīro" (Japanese: 兵器のヒーロー)	Kyohei Yamaguchi	December 24, 2017
17	"The Outbreak of the Rider Wars"; Transliteration: "Raidā Wōzu Kaisen" (Japanese: ライダーウォーズ開戦)	Shojiro Nakazawa	January 7, 2018
18	"The Golden Soldier"; Transliteration: "Ōgon no Sorujā" (Japanese: 黄金のソルジャー)	Shojiro Nakazawa	January 14, 2018
19	"The Forbidden Item"; Transliteration: "Kindan no Aitemu" (Japanese: 禁断のアイテム)	Satoshi Morota	January 21, 2018
20	"Devil's Trigger"; Transliteration: "Akuma no Torigā" (Japanese: 悪魔のトリガー)	Satoshi Morota	January 28, 2018
21	"The Unstoppable Hazard"; Transliteration: "Hazādo wa Tomaranai" (Japanese: ハザードは止まらない)	Kazuya Kamihoriuchi	February 4, 2018
22	"Victory of Tears"; Transliteration: "Namida no Bikutorī" (Japanese: 涙のビクトリー)	Kazuya Kamihoriuchi	February 11, 2018
23	"The Phantom of the West"; Transliteration: "Nishi no Fantomu" (Japanese: 西のファントム)	Kyohei Yamaguchi	February 18, 2018
24	"The Man Called Rogue"; Transliteration: "Rōgu to Yobareta Otoko" (Japanese: ローグと呼ばれた男)	Kyohei Yamaguchi	February 25, 2018
25	"The Idol's Awakening"; Transliteration: "Aidoru Kakusei" (Japanese: アイドル覚醒)	Takayuki Shibasaki	March 4, 2018
26	"The Treacherous Deathmatch"; Transliteration: "Uragiri no Desumatchi" (Japanese: 裏切りのデスマッチ)	Takayuki Shibasaki	March 11, 2018
27	"The Counterattack Hero"; Transliteration: "Gyakushū no Hīrō" (Japanese: 逆襲のヒーロー)	Ryuta Tasaki	March 18, 2018
28	"The Genius Arrives With a Tank"; Transliteration: "Tensai ga Tanku de Yattekuru" (Japanese: 天才がタンクでやってくる)	Ryuta Tasaki	March 25, 2018
29	"The Opening Bell Rings"; Transliteration: "Kaimaku no Beru ga Naru" (Japanese: 開幕のベルが鳴る)	Kazuya Kamihoriuchi	April 1, 2018
30	"The Truth of the Pandora Box"; Transliteration: "Pandora Bokkusu no Shinjitsu" (Japanese: パンドラボックスの真実)	Kazuya Kamihoriuchi	April 8, 2018
31	"Surge Out, Magma!"; Transliteration: "Hotobashire Maguma!" (Japanese: ほとばしれマグマ！)	Kazuya Kamihoriuchi	April 15, 2018
32	"A Programmed Tragedy"; Transliteration: "Puroguramu Sareta Higeki" (Japanese: プログラムされた悲劇)	Satoshi Morota	April 22, 2018
33	"The Final Weapon: Evol"; Transliteration: "Saishū Heiki Eboru" (Japanese: 最終兵器エボル)	Satoshi Morota	April 29, 2018
34	"The Best Match is Dissolved"; Transliteration: "Hanarebanare no Besuto Matchi" (Japanese: 離れ離れのベストマッチ)	Takayuki Shibasaki	May 6, 2018
35	"The Tower of Destruction"; Transliteration: "Hametsu no Tawā" (Japanese: 破滅のタワー)	Takayuki Shibasaki	May 13, 2018
36	"Evolto Hunts Planets"; Transliteration: "Eboruto wa Hoshi o Karu" (Japanese: エボルトは星を狩る)	Ryuta Tasaki	May 20, 2018
37	"The Ultimate Phase"; Transliteration: "Kyūkyoku no Fēzu" (Japanese: 究極のフェーズ)	Ryuta Tasaki	May 27, 2018
38	"Mad World"; Transliteration: "Maddo na Sekai" (Japanese: マッドな世界)	Kyohei Yamaguchi	June 3, 2018
39	"The Unstoppable Genius"; Transliteration: "Jīniasu wa Tomaranai" (Japanese: ジーニアスは止まらない)	Kyohei Yamaguchi	June 10, 2018
40	"The Final Revolution"; Transliteration: "Shūmatsu no Reboryūshon" (Japanese: 終末のレボリューション)	Satoshi Morota	June 17, 2018
41	"The Truth of the Best Match"; Transliteration: "Besuto Matchi no Shinjitsu" (Japanese: ベストマッチの真実)	Satoshi Morota	June 24, 2018
42	"Legacy of Doubt"; Transliteration: "Giwaku no Regashī" (Japanese: 疑惑のレガシー)	Takayuki Shibasaki	July 1, 2018
43	"Another Build"; Transliteration: "Mō Hitori no Birudo" (Japanese: もう一人のビルド)	Takayuki Shibasaki	July 8, 2018
44	"The End of Evolto"; Transliteration: "Eboruto no Saigo" (Japanese: エボルトの最期)	Kyohei Yamaguchi	July 15, 2018
45	"The Scientist of Hope"; Transliteration: "Kibō no Saientisuto" (Japanese: 希望のサイエンティスト)	Kyohei Yamaguchi	July 22, 2018
46	"An Oath to Be the One"; Transliteration: "Chikai no Bī Za Wan" (Japanese: 誓いのビー・ザ・ワン)	Kazuya Kamihoriuchi	July 29, 2018
47	"Zero Degree Flames"; Transliteration: "Zero-do no Honō" (Japanese: ゼロ度の炎)	Kazuya Kamihoriuchi	August 12, 2018
48	"To a World of Love & Peace"; Transliteration: "Rabu Ando Pīsu no Sekai e" (Japanese: ラブ＆ピースの世界へ)	Takayuki Shibasaki	August 19, 2018
49 (Finale)	"The Tomorrow Build Will Create"; Transliteration: "Birudo ga Tsukuru Ashita" (Japanese: ビルドが創る明日)	Takayuki Shibasaki	August 26, 2018

== Films ==
Kamen Rider Build made his first appearance as a cameo in the film Kamen Rider Ex-Aid the Movie: True Ending.

=== Heisei Generations Final ===
A Movie War film, titled Kamen Rider Heisei Generations Final: Build & Ex-Aid with Legend Rider (仮面ライダー平成ジェネレーションズ FINAL ビルド&エグゼイドwithレジェンドライダー, Kamen Raidā Heisei Jenerēshonzu Fainaru Birudo Ando Eguzeido Wizu Rejendo Raidā) was released on December 9, 2017. Aside from the casts of Kamen Rider Build and Kamen Rider Ex-Aid, Shu Watanabe and Ryosuke Miura (Kamen Rider OOO), Sota Fukushi, Shion Tsuchiya and Takushi Tanaka (Kamen Rider Fourze), Gaku Sano (Kamen Rider Gaim), and Shun Nishime and Takayuki Yanagi (Kamen Rider Ghost) returned to reprise their respective roles. The musician and writer Kenji Ohtsuki portrayed the main antagonist of the movie, Mogami Kaisei/Kaiser. The events of the movie took place between episodes 14 and 15.

=== Be the One ===
Kamen Rider Build the Movie: Be the One (劇場版 仮面ライダービルド Be The One, Gekijōban Kamen Raidā Birudo Bī Za Wan) was released in Japan on August 4, 2018, double billed with Kaitou Sentai Lupinranger VS Keisatsu Sentai Patranger en Film. Actors Masanobu Katsumura, Takashi Fujii, and Rena Matsui portrayed the main antagonists of the movie. It also featured a cameo appearance of Build's titular successor, Kamen Rider Zi-O, before his proper debut in his own series. The events of the movie took place between episodes 45 and 46.

=== Heisei Generations Forever ===
A Movie War film, titled Kamen Rider Heisei Generations Forever (仮面ライダー平成ジェネレーションズ FOREVER, Kamen Raidā Heisei Jenerēshonzu Fōebā) was released on December 22, 2018, featuring the casts of Kamen Rider Build and Kamen Rider Zi-O along with Kamen Rider Den-O. The events of the film took place after the end of the main series.

== Special episodes ==
- Kamen Rider Build: Birth! KumaTelevi!! Vs. Kamen Rider Grease (仮面ライダービルド 誕生! クマテレビ!! VS仮面ライダーグリス, Kamen Raidā Birudo Tanjō! Kuma Terebi!! Bāsasu Kamen Raidā Gurisu): Televi-Kun's "Hyper Battle DVD" (超(ハイパー)バトルDVD, Haipā Batoru Dī Bui Dī). It took place between episodes 19 and 20.
- Kamen Rider Build: Raising the Hazard Level With 7 Best Matches (仮面ライダービルド ～ハザードレベルを上げる7つのベストマッチ～, Kamen Raidā Birudo Hazādo Reberu o Ageru Nanatsu no Besuto Matchi): A web-exclusive series released on Toei's official YouTube channel. It comprises three episodes, but the final episode is exclusive to the DVD. The first and second episode took place during episode 21 and the last episode took place a month later.
- Rogue: (Note: Spelt in all capital letters.) A spin-off miniseries included in the blu-ray collection of Kamen Rider Build. It comprises three episodes and is a side story focusing on Gentoku Himuro. The first episode took place three years prior to the main series, and the second and final episodes took place after Episode 20.
1. Night Rogue Rises: Released as part of Kamen Rider Build Blu-ray Collection Volume 1.
2. Dark Night Fall: Released as part of Kamen Rider Build Blu-ray Collection Volume 2.
3. Kamen Rider Rogue: Released as part of Kamen Rider Build Blu-ray Collection Volume 3.
- Kamen Rider Prime Rogue (仮面ライダープライムローグ, Kamen Raidā Puraimu Rōgu): Televi-Kun's "Hyper Battle DVD". It takes place between episodes 41 and 42.
- I Heard the Idol Otaku Is Dating His Fav (ドルヲタ、推しと付き合うってよ, Doruota, Oshi to Tsukiautte yo): A side story featuring Kazumi Sawatari. It serves as a prequel to Build New World: Kamen Rider Grease and was released alongside Grease.

== Build New World ==
Build New World (ビルド NEW WORLD, Birudo Nyū Wārudo) is a set of two V-Cinema releases that are written by Shogo Muto and serve as spin-offs of characters from the Kamen Rider Build series. The events of the V-Cinemas take place after the end of the main series.

- Kamen Rider Cross-Z (仮面ライダークローズ, Kamen Raidā Kurōzu): A side story focusing on Ryuga Banjo. The V-Cinema is directed by Kyohei Yamaguchi and was released on April 24, 2019. The theme song is "CROSS" performed by J-CROWN & TaKu.
- Kamen Rider Grease (仮面ライダーグリス, Kamen Raidā Gurisu): A side story focusing on Kazumi Sawatari. The V-Cinema is directed by Shojiro Nakazawa and was released on November 27, 2019. The theme song is "Perfect Triumph" performed by Masanori Kobayashi (WAЯROCK).

== Other media ==
- Kamen Rider Build: Final Stage (仮面ライダービルド ファイナルステージ, Kamen Raidā Birudo Fainaru Sutēji): A stageshow that serves as an epilogue for the series.
- Novel: Kamen Rider Build (小説 仮面ライダービルド, Shōsetsu Kamen Raidā Birudo): A novel that was written by Shogo Muto and Takahito Ōmori and is part of a series of spin-off novel adaptions of the Heisei Era Kamen Riders. The novel was scheduled to be released in 2020 but has since been delayed indefinitely.

=== Video game ===
- Kamen Rider: Climax Fighters (仮面ライダー クライマックスファイターズ, Kamen Raidā Kuraimakkusu Faitāzu): The sixth installment of the Kamen Rider: Climax series, released on December 7, 2017, for PlayStation 4. It is a role-playing fighting game and featured characters from Kamen Rider Gaim to Kamen Rider Build. It is also the first Kamen Rider game to be localized in South East Asia & Korea regions.
- Kamen Rider City Wars (仮面ライダー シティウォーズ, Kamen Raidā Shiti Wōzu): A mobile city-building game. The Kamen Riders from Kamen Rider Build were featured in this game as playable characters.

== Cast ==
- Sento Kiryu (桐生 戦兎, Kiryū Sento): Atsuhiro Inukai (犬飼 貴丈, Inukai Atsuhiro)
- Ryuga Banjo (万丈 龍我, Banjō Ryūga): Eiji Akaso (赤楚 衛二, Akaso Eiji)
- Misora Isurugi (石動 美空, Isurugi Misora): Kaho Takada (高田 夏帆, Takada Kaho)
- Kazumi Sawatari (猿渡 一海, Sawatari Kazumi): Kouhei Takeda (武田 航平, Takeda Kōhei)
- Nariaki Utsumi (内海 成彰, Utsumi Nariaki): Yuki Ochi (越智 友己, Ochi Yūki)
- Gentoku Himuro (氷室 幻徳, Himuro Gentoku): Kensei Mikami (水上 剣星, Mikami Kensei)
- Sawa Takigawa (滝川 紗羽, Takigawa Sawa): Yukari Taki (滝 裕可里, Taki Yukari)
- Soichi Isurugi (石動 惣一, Isurugi Sōichi): Yasuyuki Maekawa (前川 泰之, Maekawa Yasuyuki)
- Taizan Himuro (氷室 泰山, Himuro Taizan): Meikyo Yamada (山田 明郷, Yamada Meikyō)
- Yoshiko Tajimi (多治見 喜子, Tajimi Yoshiko): Ryoko Gi (魏 涼子, Gi Ryōko)
- Masakuni Midō (御堂 正邦, Midō Masakuni): Norimasa Fuke (冨家 規政, Fuke Norimasa)
- Akaba (赤羽): Eishin (栄信)
- Aoba (青羽): Tateto Serizawa (芹澤 興人, Serizawa Tateto)
- Kiba (黄羽): Takuya Yoshimura (吉村 卓也, Yoshimura Takuya)
- Fu Washio (鷲尾 風, Washio Fū): Osamu Adachi (足立 理, Adachi Osamu)
- Rai Washio (鷲尾 雷, Washio Rai): Yuudai Nasuda (奈須田 雄大, Nasuda Yūdai)
- Eita Kawai (河合 栄多, Kawai Eita): Tsukasa Honjo (本庄 司, Honjō Tsukasa)
- Masuzawa (増沢): Taro Nakatani (中谷 太郎, Nakatani Tarō)
- Shinobu Katsuragi (葛城 忍, Katsuragi Shinobu): Zyouzi Kokubo (小久保 丈二, Kokubo Jōji)
- Takumi Katsuragi (葛城 巧, Katsuragi Takumi): Yukiaki Kiyama (木山 廉彬, Kiyama Yukiaki)
- Juzaburo Namba (難波 重三郎, Nanba Jūzaburō): Akira Hamada (浜田 晃, Hamada Akira)

=== Voice cast ===
- Evolto (エボルト, Eboruto), Evol-Driver (エボルドライバー, Eboru Doraibā), Evol-Trigger (エボルトリガー, Eboru Torigā): Tetsuo Kanao (金尾 哲夫, Kanao Tetsuo)
- Vernage (ベルナージュ, Berunāju): Sora Amamiya (雨宮 天, Amamiya Sora)
- Build Driver (ビルドドライバー, Birudo Doraibā), Nebula Steam Gun (ネビュラスチームガン, Nebyura Suchīmu Gan): Katsuya Kobayashi (小林 克也, Kobayashi Katsuya)
- Sclash Driver (スクラッシュドライバー, Sukurasshu Doraibā), Cross-Z Magma Knuckle (クローズマグマナックル, Kurōzu Maguma Nakkuru), Great Cross-Z Dragon (グレートクローズドラゴン, Gurēto Kurōzu Doragon), Grease Blizzard Knuckle (グリスブリザードナックル, Gurisu Burizādo Nakkuru): Norio Wakamoto (若本 規夫, Wakamoto Norio)
- Narrator: Bucky Koba (バッキー木場, Bakkī Koba)

=== Guest cast ===
- Kasumi Ogura (小倉 香澄, Ogura Kasumi; 2, 11, 49): Risako Itō (伊藤 梨沙子, Itō Risako)
- Kyōka Katsuragi (葛城 京香, Katsuragi Kyōka; 7–8): Hiro Komura (古村 比呂, Komura Hiro)

== Theme songs ==
Opening theme

- Be the One
  - Lyrics, Composition & Arrangement: Tetsuya Komuro, Daisuke Asakura
  - Artist: Pandora feat. Beverly
  - Episodes: 2–11, 13–15, 18–37, 39–48
  Episodes 1, 12, 16–17, 38, and 49 do not feature the show's opening sequence. This song is used as the ending theme in episodes 1, 12, 38, and 49 and as an insert song in episodes 16–17 and 39.

Insert themes

- Ready Go!!
  - Lyrics: Mio Aoyama
  - Composition & Arrangement: ats-, Takehito Shimizu, Toru Watanabe
  - Artist: ats-, Takehito Shimizu & Toru Watanabe Feat. AXL21
  - Episodes: 27–28
- Burning My Soul
  - Lyrics: BOUNCEBACK
  - Composition & Arrangement: fo(u)r Scream
  - Artist: J-CROWN & TaKu from 1 FINGER
  - Episodes: 31–32
  - Hiroyuki Takami, who played Masamune Dan from Kamen Rider Ex-Aid, made a cover of this song that was included in his album "GIMMICK ZONE".
- Evolution
  - Lyrics: Kyasu Morizuki, Mio Aoyama
  - Composition & Arrangement: ats-, Takehito Shimizu, Toru Watanabe
  - Artist: ats-, Takehito Shimizu & Toru Watanabe Feat. AXL21
  - Episodes: 33
- Build up
  - Lyrics: Chisato Akita
  - Composition & Arrangement: Kikuo Sato
  - Artist: Kamen Rider Girls
  - Episodes: 40–41
- Law of the Victory
  - Lyrics: Ricky
  - Composition: Koichi Terasawa
  - Arrangement: Kikuo Sato
  - Artist: Rider Chips
  - Episodes: 44–45

== International broadcast, home video and streaming ==
- In its home country of Japan, Kamen Rider Build was first released on DVD by Toei Video throughout 12 volumes in 2018. The series was also released on Blu-ray in 4 volumes in 2018. The Blu-ray collection also includes the spin-off miniseries ROGUE, with the behind the scenes for the miniseries being available in Volume 4. Kamen Rider Build Final Stage was officially recorded on October 13, 2018, and October 14, 2018, and released on DVD on February 6, 2019.
- In Malaysia, the series aired on TV3 with a Malay dub starting in late 2018. All episodes were covered.
- In the Chinese-Speaking World, both Mandarin (Taiwan) and Cantonese Chinese dubs were made for this series.
  - In Hong Kong, ViuTV got the rights to broadcast a Cantonese Chinese dub of the series from December 30, 2018, to December 15, 2019, with all episodes covered.
  - In Taiwan, CHT MOD aired a Taiwanese Mandarin dub of the series from August 2, 2019, to January 17, 2020, and on September 28, 2020, to December 3, 2020, on PILI TV. All episodes were covered.
- In South Korea, the series aired under the same title translated in the language (가면라이더 빌드) with a Korean dub on Anione from January 5 to April 27, 2019. It also aired on ANIBOX. All 49 episodes were covered.
- In Indonesia, the series aired in 2020 on RTV with an Indonesian dub. All episodes were covered.
- On November 7, 2023, it was officially announced that Sato Company commissioned CLONE to make a Brazilian Portuguese dub of the series for online streaming. This is the very first time in nearly 30 years that a Japanese-made Kamen Rider series was given a Brazilian Portuguese dub, as for the longest time, only Kamen Rider Black and Black RX aired with dubs, with the former debuting on April 22, 1991, and the latter debuting on July 24, 1995. The first three episodes premiered in Sato Theaters on November 19, 2023.
