= List of Gravitation characters =

This is a list of characters from the shōnen-ai manga series Gravitation written and illustrated by Maki Murakami.

== Main characters ==
=== Shuichi Shindo ===
Voiced by: Tomokazu Seki (Japanese); Rich McNanna (English)

Shuichi Shindo (新堂 愁一, Shindō Shūichi) is the primary protagonist of the series. Shuichi's ambition at the start of the series was to follow in the footsteps of his idol, Ryuichi Sakuma, the lead singer of the band Nittle Grasper, by creating his own successful music band named Bad Luck. He has pink hair. One day when, as he is walking through a park reading his lyrics of the song "Glaring Dream", a sudden breeze blows them away, where they are picked up by a mysterious man who dismisses them as "elementary-level", saying that Shuichi has zero talent and should just give up. Stung by the man's criticism, Shuichi becomes determined to make him apologize. Shortly after his friend Hiroshi Nakano helps him realize that he is attracted to the man in the park, Shuichi sees an interview on television that shows that the person in the park is in fact, the famous romance novelist Eiri Yuki. Initially, Yuki treats Shuichi coldly, but Shuichi perseveres through Yuki's icy demeanor and eventually the two begin a relationship. Shuichi's band also begins to rise in fame, and a major portion of the series focuses on his attempts to balance the demands of his job with his pursuit of Yuki's affections.

=== Eiri Yuki ===
Voiced by: Kazuhiko Inoue (Japanese); Jim J. Ward (English, as Rome Elliot)

Eiri Yuki (由貴 瑛里, Yuki Eiri) is a popular romance novelist who met Shuichi Shindo in the park and mercilessly dismissed his song lyrics. Through coincidence, they kept bumping into each other, and eventually came together romantically. In the series (manga and anime), Eiri and Shuichi struggle with their celebrity status and their mercurial relationship. Eiri's father is a monk, who runs a temple in Kyoto. He has one younger brother, Tatsuha Uesugi, who is a monk-in-training. He also has one elder sister, Mika Uesugi, who is married to Tohma Seguchi. At the beginning of the series, Eiri is engaged to Ayaka Usami. In the Gravitation EX first book, Eiri is temporarily, according to himself, blinded. It is unknown whether or not his eyes will heal. He did it to save Riku Kitazawa (his deceased past mentor Yuki Kitazawa's orphaned child) from being run over by a semi-truck, which is unlike his original character. Later, Eiri and Shuichi find that Yoshiki Kitazawa (Yuki Kitazawa's trans sister) had dumped Riku off on them to parent, possibly just until she returns. It turns out in track 76 that Eiri was faking his blindness, though the reason is unknown.

=== Tohma Seguchi ===
Voiced by: Ai Orikasa (Japanese); Bill Rogers (English)

Tohma Seguchi (瀬口 冬馬, Seguchi Tōma) is the keyboard player in Nittle Grasper and Mika Seguchi's husband. He is the head of N-G recording company and demands the best from all his contractual bands. Tohma is very protective of Eiri Yuki, and blames himself for the trauma Eiri suffered as a teenager, seeing that he was the one who hired Yuki Kitazawa in the first place. He has declared Eiri as his dearest. He is unfailingly polite to the point where he will refer to anybody (including his wife) as -san, and appears to be a friendly and even-tempered person (if also a ruthless businessman). As the series goes on, it becomes evident that much of this is a carefully constructed mask: when Eiri is involved, Tohma has been known to be far from rational and soft-spoken. Tohma is an anime-adaptation of Daisuke Asakura, who wrote most of the music for the series

== Supporting characters ==
=== Hiroshi Nakano ===
Voiced by: Yasunori Matsumoto (Japanese); Daniel Kevin Harrison (English)

Hiroshi "Hiro" Nakano (中野 浩司, Nakano Hiroshi) is like a big brother to Shuichi. He is Shuichi's best friend and the other original member of Bad Luck. Quiet and far more wise than the impetuous Shuichi, Hiroshi tries to serve as the voice of reason for Shuichi as he falls head over heels for Eiri Yuki. Hiroshi himself is not immune to love. He eventually finds himself smitten with Eiri's supposed fiancée from Kyoto. At first, it doesn't seem as though it will go far because Ayaka still seems to have feelings for Yuki. However, over time she gets over Yuki and agrees to go steady with Hiro. Ayaka made a bet with Hiro (same with Yuki to Shuichi) that if they sold 1,000,000 copies of one CD they debuted they would go on a date. Hiroshi also has an older brother, Yuuji. The two of them were disowned by their parents for their chosen career choices: Hiroshi, the guitarist in a band, and Yuuji, an actor. Yuuji never ends up getting roles for his acting, but he keeps trying. Hiro also warned Yuki that he had better not make Shuichi cry over anything but Shuichi's own stupidity, anything else Hiro warns that he would teach Yuki a lesson on hurting a brother-like friend that means a lot like Shuichi. Shuichi always told everyone that Bad Luck isn't Bad Luck without Hiro.

=== Suguru Fujisaki ===
Voiced by: Fujiko Takimoto (Japanese); Luke Novak (English)

Suguru Fujisaki (藤崎 順, Fujisaki Suguru) is hired as Bad Luck's keyboard player. Though he usually fakes being polite to others, young Suguru is quite similar to his cousin, Tohma Seguchi, despite his unfortunate proclivity for being controlled by others. While only sixteen years old, he has incredible talent—and knows it. Suguru knows Eiri Yuki's past as well, but it seems that Yuki also knows a bit about Suguru himself: he has commented before about Suguru "hiding his real identity". He is quite short for his age, something K and Tatsuha constantly tease him about. In the manga, he is also known to make sexual advances towards Hiroshi.

=== Ryuichi Sakuma ===
Voiced by: Kappei Yamaguchi (Japanese); Kenneth Miller (English, as Kenneth Robert Marlo)

Ryuichi Sakuma (佐久間 竜一, Sakuma Ryūichi) is the lead singer of the popular band Nittle Grasper along with Tohma Seguchi and Noriko Ukai, and friend of Shuichi. He left the band three years ago to pursue a solo career in America, but returned to Japan to reform Nittle Grasper. Shuichi is excited at the news of Nittle Grasper's reunion, but that now makes Ryuichi his rival. Ryuichi is kind and sometimes seems to have the mind of a five-year-old until he starts singing; then he becomes a really cool, mature, vocal god. Other characters have noticed that Ryuichi and Shuichi are quite similar in their childlike manner. His best friend is a pink bunny named Kumagoro (Mr. Bear in the English version), which is from K-san, his old manager. It contains a tracking device and is from the K brand stuffed animal line.

=== Noriko Ukai ===
Voiced by: Yuri Amano (Japanese, TV series), Haruna Ikezawa (Japanese, OVA); Megan Hollingshead (English, TV series), Jessica Calvello (English, OVA; as Zoe Fries)

Noriko Ukai (鵜飼 典子, Ukai Noriko) used to be the keyboard player for Nittle Grasper, but joins Bad Luck for a bit on Tohma's request. Once Nittle Grapser gets back together though, she leaves for good. Noriko is rude, loud, and talented. She won't take junk from any of her band members, and demands the best out of them. Often she acts like an older sister to Ryuichi.

=== Claude "K" Winchester ===
Voiced by: Ryotaru Okiayu (Japanese); Brian Maillard (English)

Claude K. Winchester, known simply as "K", is Ryuichi's former manager and now the manager for Bad Luck, K is aggressive in promoting the band. His concern is first and foremost Bad Luck, but in his shaping of the band's career, he ends up involving himself in Eiri and Shuichi's relationship. He is American, and in the original Japanese version, they played on the stereotype that Americans always have guns and will pull them out any time, any place. K often speaks English mixed in with his Japanese. Also in the manga it is shown that K has a family; he has a wife named Judy, and a son named Michael.

=== Mr. Sakano ===
Voiced by: Takehito Koyasu (Japanese); Bill Timoney (English, as Billy Regan)

A very stressed worker, Sakano (坂野) (first name unknown) worships Tohma and tries to be the perfect business man for him no matter what. Sakano takes every opportunity, though he's not as conniving as K. Sakano has a tendency of panicking that often makes him seem like nothing but an overly nervous salaryman. Nevertheless, he takes Bad Luck seriously, and has even gone against Tohma in order to secure their success.

=== Mika Seguchi ===
Voiced by: Hiromi Tsuru (Japanese); Debora Rabbai (English, as Angora Deb)

Mika Seguchi (瀬口 美華, Seguchi Mika) is Eiri's older sister and Tohma's wife. She's beautiful, yet cold. She looks quite a bit like Eiri except with longer hair and makeup. In book one, she wanted to make Eiri see his dying father, bribing Shuichi with her own husband (Tohma). Later in the manga series we find out she and Tohma are going to have a child.

=== Tatsuha Uesugi ===
Voiced by: Hideo Ishikawa (Japanese); Jason Griffith (English); Hannes Maurer (German)

Tatsuha Uesugi (上杉 樹把, Uesugi Tatsuha) is Eiri's brother, who has the same voice and characteristics as his older brother, but with black hair and eyes. Tatsuha is obsessed with Ryūichi and watches his Nittle Grasper video repetitively. He's quite the perverted and obsessive fan, not to mention a 16-year-old monk.

=== Ayaka Usami ===
Voiced by: Rie Tanaka (Japanese); Rachael Lillis (English)

Ayaka Usami (宇佐美 綾加, Usami Ayaka) is betrothed to Eiri and likes him very much, but wants what's best for him, so she lets Shuichi stay with Eiri and tries to give up on him. Hiro has a crush on her and later they go on a date together.

=== Reiji ===
Voiced by: Miki Nagasawa

Reiji (レイジ) originally works for the American record company XMR of which her father is the president. She tries to get Shuichi to sign with XMR when he leaves Japan after Eiri breaks up with him. Further continuing the Americans-with-guns stereotype, Reiji is often seen with some sort of projectile weapon, which is more often than not a bazooka. Reiji's ultimate weapon however is her giant Panda mecha, in reference to the fact that she wears glasses, a common insult to meganekko. During his stay in New York, Reiji falls in love with Shuichi, but does not quite understands these feelings at first. She accepts that it can only be a one-sided affection, though that does not stop her from following him back to Japan and becomes Bad Luck's temporary manager while K is suspended. She continues to hang around after his return until Ryuichi decides he wants to return to the U.S. and be an actor; Reiji returns with him to be his new manager.

Reiji only appears in the manga and the drama CD.
