= D-Trick =

Studio album by Daisuke Asakura
- Released: September 2, 1992
- Genres: Electropop, power pop
- Length: 54:00
- Label: Funhouse Records
- Producer: Daisuke Asakura

Daisuke Asakura chronology
LANDING TIMEMACHINE (1991)	D-Trick (1992)	THE ELECTROMANCER (1995)

D-Trick is the second solo album by Daisuke Asakura, as well as the last solo album released by him before he joined the popular J-pop group Access. It was released on September 2, 1992 and features vocals by Reimy on track 5 and Hiroyuki Takami on tracks 5, 7 and 12.

== Track listing ==
1. "A Moonlit Night" – 4:26
2. "Mignight Party" – 4:11
3. "Smile Energy" – 3:53
4. "The Door" – 2:14
5. "1000 nen no chikai" – 5:37
  (1000年の誓い)
6. "Rainbow in the Universe" – 3:34
7. "COSMIC RUNAWAY" – 5:18
8. "Kagami no naka no meiro" – 5:52
  (鏡の中の迷路)
9. "Funny Spot" – 4:50
10. "Bridge of Harmony" – 3:10
11. "Eternal Dream" - 3:47
12. "Toybox in the Morning" - 6:08
