= List of Gravitation chapters =

The cover of the first volume of Gravitation as published by Gentosha in March 1996 in Japan.

The chapters of Gravitation are written and illustrated by Maki Murakami. Tokyopop licensed the series for an English-language release in North America and published the twelve volumes from August 5, 2003, to July 12, 2005. Madman Entertainment distributes the series in New Zealand and Australia.

== Volume list ==
No.	Original release date	Original ISBN	North American release date	North American ISBN
01	March 1996	978-4-7897-8023-0	August 5, 2003	978-1-59182-333-9
02	July 1996	978-4-7897-8036-0	October 7, 2003	978-1-59182-334-6
03	November 1996	978-4-7897-8044-5	December 9, 2003	978-1-59182-335-3
04	March 1997	978-4-7897-8050-6	February 4, 2004	978-1-59182-336-0
05	August 1997	978-4-7897-8059-9	April 6, 2004	978-1-59182-337-7
06	April 1998	978-4-7897-8072-8	June 1, 2004	978-1-59182-338-4
07	October 1998	978-4-7897-8088-9	August 3, 2004	978-1-59182-339-1
08	May 1999	978-4-7897-8106-0	October 12, 2004	978-1-59182-340-7
09	January 2000	978-4-7897-8218-0	December 14, 2004	978-1-59182-341-4
10	July 2000	978-4-7897-8278-4	February 8, 2005	978-1-59182-342-1
11	December 2000	978-4-7897-8322-4	April 12, 2005	978-1-59532-414-6
12	August 2002	978-4-344-80117-2	July 12, 2005	978-1-59532-415-3
