= The Electromancer =

Studio album by Daisuke Asakura
- Released: July 21, 1995
- Genre: Electropop, synthpop
- Length: 62:00
- Label: Funhouse Records
- Producer: Daisuke Asakura

Daisuke Asakura chronology
D-Trick (1992)	The Electromancer (1995)	21st Fortune (2002)

The Electromancer is the second solo album released by Daisuke Asakura on July 21, 1995, and the first solo album released by Asakura after his departure from the popular J-pop group Access. It features vocals by Takanori Nishikawa and Shingo Katsurayama.

== Track listing ==
#	Title	Length	Lyrics
1	"The Electromancer"	4:20
2	"Black or White?(L.A.Mix)"	5:07	Akio Inoue
3	"Karma Forest"	4:37
4	"Space Paradise"	5:53	Makoto Asakura
5	"Rainy Heart ~ doshaburi no omoide no naka (L.A.Mix) " (Rainy Heart〜どしゃ降りの想い出の中(L.A.Mix))	5:13	Akio Inoue
6	"Beat of Dream"	4:59	Daisuke Asakura; Makoto Asakura
7	"Magnetic Spring"	5:50
8	"Whisper City"	5:38
9	"Siren's Melody(L.A.Mix)"	5:40	Makoto Asakura
10	"Atlantic Weave(L.A.Mix)"	6:21
11	"The Electromancer (Kanashimino Kawawo Yorokobino Okawo)"	6:10	Daisuke Asakura; Makoto Asakura
12	"Vintage"	6:10

- All songs produced, composed and arranged by Daisuke Asakura
