= Gate II =

Studio album by Iceman
- Released: June 6, 1999
- Genres: Pop, pop rock, electropop, dance-pop
- Length: 50:20
- Label: Antinos Records
- Producer: Daisuke Asakura

Iceman chronology
Digiryzm Mutation (1998)	Gate II (1999)	Gate I (1999)

Gate II is the third album released by Japanese pop rock trio Iceman on May 21, 1998. It is also the first in a small series of albums released by Iceman from 1999 until their official departure from the Japanese music scene in 2003. This series includes three studio albums (Gate II, Gate I, and Gate//White), as well as 1 remix album and 1 "analog" album (gate out – 1st remix album and gate out – 1st analog album, respectively). This album also contains the single "Shining Collection", which since its use in the anime Gravitation, has gained a substantial following among the anime/manga community.

== Track listing ==
All music is composed by Daisuke Asakura, except track 3 (Kenichi Ito).

No.	Title	Length
1.	"Red Gate Open"	1:12
2.	"Perfect Future?"	4:06
3.	"Expander Drive Machine" (Expander Drive Machine ～発展途上人型アンドロイドの見た夢)	4:23
4.	"Wish Matrix"	5:05
5.	"Caution!"	7:06
6.	"Space Dreamer"	5:27
7.	"Fate Weather"	5:07
8.	"Gate II~Sensitive Gate"	5:45
9.	"Shining Collection"	4:40
10.	"For the next Gate from Red"	2:21
