= Kanpai! =

Japanese manga series by Maki Murakami

- Cover of the first Japanese volume

キミのうなじに乾杯! (Kimi no Unaji ni Kanpai!)
- Genre: Comedy
- Manga
- Written by: Maki Murakami
- Published by: Sony Magazines; Gentosha
- English publisher: AUS: Madman Entertainment; NA: Tokyopop
- Magazine: Comic Birz
- Original run: 2000 – 2001
- Volumes: 2

Kanpai! or Kimi no Unaji ni Kanpai! (Japanese: キミのうなじに乾杯!; 'A Toast to Your Nape!') is a Japanese manga series written and illustrated by Maki Murakami. Sony Magazines published the manga first tankōbon volume under the Birz Comics imprint in March 2001. The first volume was republished and a second volume was released by Gentosha on December 24, 2001. Tokyopop released the series in English on September 13 and December 13, 2005. The series was republished into a "special ban" on December 24, 2011, and a follow-up, Kimi no Unaji ni Kanpai! R, was published on June 23, 2012.

== Characters ==
Shintarō Yamada (山田 新太郎, Yamada Shintarō)
He is a monster guardian in-training, as monsters are nearly extinct and overhunted by mankind. He carries a squared timber as a weapon, and was raised by Ponta-san. Shintarou shows up at the Taino Municipal Middle School one day as a new student, claiming to be Brazilian, but the first thing the other students notice about him is that he perfectly matches the description of a murderer in that morning's newspaper—which is completely correct; Shintarou had killed an exorcist the night before in defence of a werewolf. He sees Nao's nape and soon falls in love, but with her nape, not Nao herself. In volume two, it is revealed that Shintarou seems to be half vampire and half human. He seems to live in a mountainous area of Tokyo with his father, who is staying temporarily.
Ponta
A talking rabbit, he was charged by Shintarou's father to raise him and help him earn his temporary guardian's licence by killing three hundred exorcists.
Nao Arisaka
She is a typical, spoiled, beautiful girl. Incredibly narcissistic, she is pined for by almost every male (teachers included) in the school, and delights in crushing their hopes. She later becomes Shintarou's "meal for life" after he bites her neck and sucks her blood to revive himself after being killed by Sakurai Miko.
Akiko Nakamura
Akiko is Nao's best friend, and apparently has powerful brainwaves that can pick up the supernatural. She seems to suffer from anemia, and faints at times of high excitement. She eventually gains a strong friendship with Miko's ceremonial spirit, and can call him to her aid.
Kenken
Kenken is the werewolf Shintarou saved. He is caught by an exorcist eating a girl he had just killed, and would have died without Shintarou's help. The exorcist later comes after Shintarou and Nao as a zombie. The werewolf appears and holds him still, commanding Shintarou to run them both through with his timber—which he does without any hesitation, to the disgust of Nao and the exorcist. The shock of the werewolf's death transferred his soul to the exorcist's body. Shintarou dubs him "Kenken-kun" and he begins attending middle school with Nao and Shintarou.
Yabe
A ghost, he first appears hostile, as he goes to extremes to keep Shintarou from Nao. He lingered on because of his unrequited love for her. She eventually grants the desire keeping him from moving on—acknowledging him as an equal being by calling his name. Instead of going to heaven, however, he somehow returns to his human body and begins attending school again. He seems to have trouble holding onto his body, though; he is often killed again and barely manages to return to his flesh in time.
Papa
Shintarō's father, he is a full vampire and an apparent womanizer. He is determined to have Sakurai Miko as his wife after he defeats her and drinks her blood. He seems rough with his son, though seems to care enough about him to come to his aid.
Noriko Kuroma
Short, hyperactive, and paranoid she is a deranged girl who is known as the president of the Occult SF Sorcery Investigation Club. She draws a magic Square to drag the supposed 'demon' out of Shintarou and actually releases his true vampire form.
Mysterious Exorcist
He is a look-alike of Yuki from Gravitation, minus his ponytail. He appears to be after Yamada's father but accidentally runs into Shintarou himself. He allows Shintarou to live for an unknown reason and ends up fighting against Papa Yamada.
