= Gamerz Heaven =

Japanese manga series

- First tankōbon volume cover

ゲーマーズヘブン! (Gēmāzu Hebun!)
- Genre: Adventure, science fiction
- Manga
- Written by: Maki Murakami
- Published by: Mag Garden
- English publisher: NA: ADV Manga
- Magazine: Monthly Comic Blade
- Original run: September 30, 2002 – 2005
- Volumes: 4

Gamerz Heaven (Japanese: ゲーマーズヘブン!, Hepburn: Gēmāzu Hebun!) is a Japanese manga series written and illustrated by Maki Murakami. It was serialized in Mag Garden's Shōnen manga magazine Monthly Comic Blade from 2002 to 2005 and published in four volumes.

== Plot ==
The story follows young gamer Kaito Suzuki, who one day discovers a video game that transports the player to a different dimension. Upon reaching this strange new world, Kaito discovers a boy known as the "navigator", aptly dubbed "Nata". Kaito soon discovers that everything that happens in the game affects the real world, which. Since Gamerz Heaven is a beta version, Kaito has a limited number of saves.

Soon after starting the game, Kaito is attacked by the class president, Ogura. Ogura falls to Kaito and vanishes from the Second Zone. Afterwards, no one believes that Ogura ever existed except for Kaito's best friend Kawashima, who loves video games just as much as Kaito. Later, Kaito eventually convinces his other friends, Rio and Ren, who did not believe him until a "meteor" hits the center of Tokyo, which was actually the work of the first area boss of Gamerz Heaven, Rush.

== Publication ==
Written and illustrated by Maki Murakami, the series began serialization in Mag Garden's Shōnen manga magazine Monthly Comic Blade magazine on September 30, 2002. (Note: It started in the magazine's November issue of 2002 (cover date November 1), which was released on September 30.) It completed its serialization in Monthly Comic Blade in 2005. Its individual chapters were collected into four tankōbon volumes.

In March 2004, ADV Manga announced that they licensed the series for English publication.

=== Volumes ===
No.	Original release date	Original ISBN	English release date	English ISBN
1	April 10, 2003	978-4-90-192640-9	November 23, 2004	978-1-41-390202-0
2	October 10, 2003	978-4-90-192682-9	February 22, 2005	978-1-41-390199-3
3	April 10, 2004	978-4-86-127032-1	—	—
4	April 10, 2005	978-4-86-127136-6	—	—

== Reception ==
Mike Dungan of Mania praised the story, characters, and artwork, particularly the character designs. Liann Cooper of Anime News Network felt that Murakami improved her character designs from Gravitation. However, Cooper felt the series was "not especially poor, not especially good...just kind of there". In Manga: The Complete Guide, Jason Thompson praised the artwork, though he felt the story was "confusing and dull".
