= Iceman (band) =

Japanese band

- Origin: Japan
- Genres: Pop; rock; electropop; dance-pop
- Years active: 1996–2000
- Past members: Daisuke Asakura; Kenichi Ito; Michihiro Kuroda

Iceman was a three-member Japanese electronica/pop rock group, consisting of Daisuke Asakura (keyboards), Kenichi Ito (guitar), and Michihiro Kuroda (lead vocals). They officially assembled on June 5, 1996, when a press conference was held in Tokyo to announce the two musicians who would accompany Daisuke Asakura in his next musical venture after the breakup of Access. Between 1996 and 1999, they released six albums, a multitude of PV and live concert videos, and even a video game. Their unique and varied sound bridged genres from hard electronic rock ("Shining Collection"), to pop ("Edge of the season"), and even techno ("Caution").

Iceman is perhaps best known for their single "Shining Collection", which was used as the opening theme for Gravitation: Lyrics of Love (Asakura served as music director and composer for the series). The song became popular internationally as a result of its use in the anime, as well as in a cult flash cartoon hosted on Newgrounds, A Sticky Night of Love.

The majority of the group's tracks were written by Asakura and/or Ito.

== Discography ==
=== Singles ===
- Dark Half~ Touch Your Darkness (29 July 1996)
- Breathless Night Slider (18 November 1996)
- Edge of the season (3 May 1997)
- Final Prayer (21 August 1997)
- 8 banme no tsumi (21 November 1997)
- Lost Complex (21 March 1998)
- Shining Collection

=== Albums ===
- Power Scale (26 May 1997)
- Digiryzm Mutation (21 May 1998)
- Gate II (6 June 1999)
- Gate I (7 July 1999)
- gate out - 1st Remix Album (11 November 1999)
- gate out - 1st Analog Album (27 November 1999)
- Gate // white (21 December 1999)

=== DVD ===
- 0:00-H“Iceman (26 November 1996)
- V-Scale 1 (1 May 1997)
- Live Scale 1997 - 1st Live (22 October 1997)
- V-Mutation (21 May 1998)
- Iceman Live Mutation 1998 - 2nd Live (21 November 1998)
- Crazy Jet (29 April 1999)
- Gate V (22 September 1999)
- Live Gate 1999 ~Type Around at yoyogi-daini~ - 3rd Live (21 January 2001)
- Gate V (22 September 1999)
- DVD Video - Iceman Clips (9 March 2005)
