= Kimeru =

- Born: June 17, 1980 (age 46); Kumamoto, Japan
- Genres: Pop, rock
- Years active: 2001–present
- Labels: Nippon Crown, birdie house inc. - Absolute production, Marvelous!
- Website: http://www.kimeru.com/

Kimeru (most often written either in Romaji (Kimeru) or with Katakana (キメル), but has been written as きめる (Hiragana) and (決める) (Kanji), born June 17, 1980) is a Japanese pop musician, singer, and stage actor. He is most famous for his work with The Prince of Tennis. He adopted the stage name Kimeru, which means "to decide" in Japanese, before debuting. Kimeru's birth name has never been announced publicly. From 2018 onwards, with the release of his 16th single "go forward", the singer's name is now stylized as KIMERU.

== Biography ==
=== Before musical career ===
Born June 17, 1980 in Kumamoto-ken in Japan, after graduating from high school, he originally became a mailman, but later decided to pursue a career as a singer.

=== 2001/2002 ===
On December 5, 2001 Kimeru released his first single, "You Got Game?" with Absolute Productions/Birdie House Inc. The song was used as the first ending song for the anime テニスの王子様 (The Prince of Tennis, commonly called "TeniPuri" or "AniPuri"), which was based on a manga by the same name created by Takeshi Konomi. He followed up this release one year later with "Make You Free", which was also used as an opening song for later episodes of TeniPuri.

=== 2003/2004 ===
In the spring of 2003, Kimeru originated the role of Shusuke Fuji, the prodigy of Seigaku Middle School's tennis club, in The Prince of Tennis musical production series (commonly called Tenimyu), and understudied the lead role of Ryoma Echizen. The rising popularity of the musical brought rising popularity to his music, and on November 27, 2003 Kimeru released his first mini-album, The Beginning. Kimeru would sing "You Got Game?" at the end of each show for three of the musicals (the first musical, Remarkable 1st Match Fudomine, and Side Fudomine), and "Make You Free" for Dream Live 1st.

The end of 2003 also brought tragedy to Tenimyu. Less than two weeks before the second musical of the series, Remarkable 1st Match Fudomine, the lead actor cast for the main role of Echizen, Kotaro Yanagi, was struck by a car and was in critical condition for some months. Because the musical's rehearsals were well underway and performance dates already set, Kimeru had to step up into the role. Takashi Nagayama (who was playing the role of Eiji Kikumaru) filled in as Fuji, and Yamazaki Ichitaro (who had left the series) came back as Kikumaru. Kimeru was struck so hard by his friend's accident that when he released his third single, "OVERLAP" (a theme song for the anime Yu-Gi-Oh! Duel Monsters), he also dedicated its coupling song, "Oath in the Storm", to Yanagi. Kimeru returned to his role of Fuji when Yuya Endo was brought in as the new Echizen (Nagayama went back to Kikumaru as well, and Ichitaro permanently left). A small joke about Kimeru playing Echizen was added in Dream Live 1st.

In late April/early May 2004, Kimeru went on his very first tour, "OVERLAP". With only three dates (one in Nagoya, Osaka, and Tokyo), it was his stepping stone into real touring as a professional singer. On August 25, 2004 he released his fourth single, "Be Shiny", as well as his first DVD with live footage and music videos. To celebrate the release of his new material, he went on another tour in September and November 2004.

=== 2005 ===
At the beginning of 2005, for his last show in Tenmiyu - Side Fudomine - Kimeru was reunited with a recovered Kotaro Yanagi, who would share the role of Echizen with Endo. Kimeru's role of Fuji would be carried on by Hiroki Aiba, Yuuta Furukawa, Hashimoto Taito, Ryou Mitsuya and Yusuke Yata. Not losing any steam, Kimeru released his fifth single "The Pleasure of Love", as well as toured yet again, adding two new stops to his route (Sendai & Fukuoka). Kimeru's popularity was growing, and on May 21, 2005, he performed in his first seated live house (Shibuya Public Hall in Tokyo). This live was later released on DVD.

In the summer of 2005 Kimeru was officially signed onto the Nippon Crown (Crown Records) label under "Crown Gold". Being signed onto a larger and more well-known label proved beneficial for Kimeru, and with the release of his sixth single "Answer Will Come", he put on his special Kimeru-Land Summer Eruption 2005 tour, complete with games and selling of old merchandise. He added an extra stop in Hiroshima as well as performed on two different days for Nagoya and Tokyo.

Winter of 2005 brought even more success to Kimeru. After the release of his seventh single, "Love Bites", he released his first ever full-length album, Glorious. He later released a piano score for the album.

=== 2006 ===
At the start of 2006, Kimeru departed on another tour to promote Glorious, kicking off at the Kouseinunkin Hall in Tokyo on New Years Day, and hand-signing over 1000 posters that would be given out to each attendee. Kimeru was also rewarded the "Rookie of the Year" award from Nippon Crown.

Spring of 2006 proved a busy time for Kimeru. While his regular radio show "Kimeruのキラキラ☆レコーディング (Kimeru no KiraKira*Recording)" ended, Kimeru became a regular guest on shows for bayFM, FM Fukuoka and FM Kumamoto. He also sang the song "Style", the ending song for the new anime "Musashi", created by Monkey Punch, as well as released his new single "恋のパフォーマンス: To Be with You (Koi no Performance ~To Be with You~") and his DVD Glorious Films, a recording of his glorious tour. Somehow in the midst of all his work, Kimeru toured once again, holding a special live in Tokyo on April 19 (the day of his new single's release), and ending his tour in Tokyo again. He also released his first photobook, Prince of New Noble Glam Rock, through pia and R&R Newsmaker.

On April 24, 2006, Kimeru announced that he would be making his first ever live appearance overseas in China. His visit resulted after his fans in China continuously mailed letters and presents to a place in Beijing called the "Japanese Music Information Center (JAMIC)". After some consultations, it was finally decided that Kimeru would visit both Beijing and Chongqing. This was incredible news, and a big step in Kimeru's career.

Upon arriving in China, he was greeted by a mass of fans waiting for him outside the airport. During his entire visit, he was completely overwhelmed with the amount of support he received, and was very surprised when his name appeared in "Cool-kei Ongaku", a magazine for Japanese and Korean artists, ranking 9th in Individual Male Performers, among huge acts like Hyde, Yamapi, and other famous acts.

On July 22, 2006, the Kimeru-Land Summer Dream 2006 event struck Tokyo. Along with a mass of goods (both new and old) and various games Kimeru-Land provided to the concert goers, Kimeru put on a grueling 4 hour concert, singing every one of the songs he had previously released, including songs he's only ever sang live, re-mixes and acoustic versions of some songs, and one new song. Kimeru also had Yoshinori Sugimoto, former guitarist and founder of the J-Rock band Waive, as a special guest (Sugimoto was the producer for "Style").

Kimeru performed with Uverworld and Undergraph on R&R's MIX UP! event August 16, which shortly was followed with the announcement of his next single "Timeless", along with his next tour, Kimeru Tour 2006 "Starry & Timeless". Anticipation rose for the single when Kimeru announced the PV for Timeless would feature some of his old castmates from Tenimyu: Sota Aoyama (Sadaharu Inui), Eiji Takigawa (Kunimitsu Tezuka), and Naoya Gomoto (Kaoru Kaidoh). Kai Asami was also announced to be a part of the PV. In addition to this, Kimeru was delighted to announce a stop in Kumamoto during his tour, his first time performing in his home town.

From October 2 - October 6, Kimeru was featured in the famous "J Pop Cafe" in Shibuya, Tokyo. The cafe features various JPop artists, and serves food and drink inspired by the artist. Fans can sit at the cafe and enjoy watching some of the artist's music videos and listen to their music. The Cafe opened only months before it featured the popular Japanese band L'Arc-en-Ciel.

When "Timeless" was finally released on October 4, the announcement was made about Kimeru's next single, featuring a collaboration between him and popular musician Daisuke Asakura. Known as DA to most of his fans, most people know him from either his work with the popular anime series Gravitation, or from producing many songs for the singer T.M.Revolution. The new release, called "Starry Heavens", was set for release just one month after "Timeless".

Kimeru, along with Endo and Nagayama, went to see Yanagi when he was graduating from his role of Echizen during Tenimyu's Dream Live 3rd concert.

=== 2007 ===
At the beginning of 2007, Kimeru released his much anticipated 2nd album, Galaxy Kiss. The album featured collaborations with SOPHIA, Soul'd Out, as well as the return of Daisuke Asakura. Shortly after the release of the album, Kimeru performed at his second "Ark" special celebrating his 5th Anniversary.

Continuing with the theme of his 5th Anniversary, Kimeru announced tour dates for his 2007 Spring tour, which included special dates for a free screening of a special Timeless DVD as well as a special acoustic live for his fanclub members. Also included were dates for a regular tour, Kimeru 5th Anniversary Tour 2007 "Radiant-spring". Along with all his touring, Kimeru released his 11th single, "With You", which was produced by Tetsuya Komuro, who has worked with such acts as BoA, Backstreet Boys, and Ryuichi Sakamoto.

Taking a small break from his singing, Kimeru returned to the stage to star as the title role in the musical Pippin. He shared the role with his Tenimyu replacement, Hiroki Aiba.

=== 2008 ===
Kimeru released one single titled "Koishite Kimeru!", which was produced and featured Rolly Teranishi. He has also released self-titled album, which contains 13 songs. On July, Kimeru reprised his role in Pippin once again. On November 26, he released a new mini album entitled Shi Ru Be internationally.

=== 2009 ===
Kimeru once again returned to the stage to star in the musical Titanic. He also released a new album, entitled Discover, on his birthday.

=== 2010 ===
Kimeru returned to his role as Shusuke Fuji and reunite with the 1st generation Seigaku cast to perform in Tenimyu's Dream Live 7th.

=== 2011 ===
Kimeru performed at the Anisama in Shanghai Only One concert, 19 February, which was held at the Shanghai Grand Stage. He then took part in another stage play called Shounen Hollywood, which co-starred fellow TeniMyu cast member Takashi Nagayama.

=== 2013 ===
Kimeru was a guest at Tenimyu's Dream Live 2013, 10 year anniversary. There he sang "You Got Game".

=== 2018 ===
In February it was announced that Kimeru, now written as KIMERU, would perform the second opening theme of the Yu-Gi-Oh! VRAINS anime, named "Go Forward". This was his second work for the "Yu-Gi-Oh!" anime. The song debuted on TV on 11 April 2018, and the single was released in two different types on May 30, 2018. Type-A is anime jacket edition, Type-B is artist jacket edition.

=== 2019 ===
KIMERU released two new works: on March 13 his new mini album, "Liar", which contained "Go Forward" and 6 new songs. In April he was chosen to perform the third opening of the Yu-Gi-Oh! VRAINS anime, titled "Calling". The song debuted on TV on 22 May 2019; a single for the song was released on 10 July 2019.

== Discography ==
=== Singles ===
Release	Track list
"You Got Game?" (Single); December 5, 2001; NECM-12022	1. You Got Game?; 2. Chain of Mind; 3. You Got Game? (Karaoke); 4. Chain of Mind (Karaoke)
"Make You Free" (Single); December 4, 2002; NECM-12039	1. Make You Free; 2. Song for You ~愛すべき人へ~; 3. Make You Free (Karaoke); 4. Song for You ~愛すべき人へ~ (Karaoke)
"Overlap" - Anime Version (Single); February 25, 2004; NECM-12072	1. Overlap; 2. Oath in the Storm; 3. Overlap (Karaoke); 4. Oath in the Storm (Karaoke)
"Overlap" - Artist Version (Single); February 25, 2004; NECM-12071	1. Overlap; 2. Overlap Live 2003.12.06; 3. Feel My Soul ~闘いの中で~ LIVE 2003.12.06; 4. Overlap (Karaoke)
"Be Shiny" (Single); August 25, 2004; MTCS-1004	1. Be Shiny; 2. ミラーボール; 3. Prism; 4. Beat a Path; 5. Chain of Mind: Live
"The Pleasure of Love" (Single); February 26, 2005; MTCS-1007	1. The Pleasure of Love; 2. Pink; 3. Be Shiny (LIVE); 4. Beat a Path (LIVE)
"Answer Will Come" (Single); August 24, 2005; CRCP-10118	1. Answer Will Come; 2. Stand Up: Break Away; 3. You Got Game?: From K's Ark 2005; 4. Answer Will Come(instrumental)
"Love Bites" (Single + DVD); November 2, 2005; CRCP-10123	1. Love Bites; 2. Dream Lover; 3. Love Bites (instrumental); DVD track listing 1. Answer Will Come (KLSE Shibuya AX 05.08.20/21); 2. Stand Up: Break Away (KLSE Shibuya AX 05.08.20/21)
"Love Bites" (Single); November 2, 2005; CRCP-10126	1. Love Bites; 2. Dream Lover; 3. Love Bites (instrumental)
"恋のパフォーマンス" "To Be with You" (Single); April 19, 2006; CRCP-10134	1. 恋のパフォーマンス: To Be with You; 2. Hero; 3. Pink from Tour "Glorious"; 4. 恋のパフォーマンス: To Be with You (instrumental)
"Timeless (Type A)" (Single + DVD); October 4, 2006; CRCP-10148	1. Timeless; 2. Dive into the Heart; DVD track listing 1. Timeless PV
"Timeless (Type B)" (Single + DVD); October 4, 2006; CRCP-10149	1. Timeless; 2. Dive into the Heart; DVD track listing 1. Dive into the Heart (KLSD Shinkiba Studio Coast 07.22.2006)
"Timeless" (Single); October 4, 2006; CRCP-10150	1. Timeless; 2. Dive into the Heart
"Starry Heavens" (Single); November 15, 2006; CRCP-10155	1. Starry Heavens; 2. White Night; 3. Starry Heavens (instrumental); DVD track listing 1. Starry Heavens PV
"Starry Heavens" (Single); November 15, 2006; CRCP-10156	1. Starry Heavens; 2. White Night; 3. Color: Summer Dream 2006~; 4. Starry Heavens (instrumental)
"With You" (Single); May 16, 2007; CRCP-10168	1. With You; 2. Regret; 3. With You (Summer Time Memories Remix); 4. With You (instrumental); DVD track listing 1. With You PV
"With You" (Single); May 16, 2007; CRCP-10169	1. With You; 2. Regret; 3. With You (Summer Time Memories Remix); 4. With You (instrumental)
"君じゃなきゃダメなんだ" (Single); August 8, 2007; CRCP-10181	1.君じゃなきゃダメなんだ; 2.All the time 3.君じゃなきゃダメなんだ (instrumental); 4.All the time (instrumental)
"Junk Beat" (Single); OCtober 31, 2007; CRCP-10183	1. Junk Beat; 2. Waiting For...; 3. Junk Beat (instrumental); 4. Waiting For... (instrumental); DVD track listing 1.Junk Beat PV
"Junk Beat" (Single); October 31, 2007; CRCP-10184	1. Junk Beat; 2. Waiting For...; 3. Junk Beat (instrumental); 4. Waiting For... (instrumental)
"恋してキメル!" "(Koishite Kimeru!)" (Single); January 23, 2008; CRCP-10190	1. 恋してキメル!; 2. ラブタッチ; 3. 恋してキメル! (instrumental); 4. ラブタッチ (instrumental); DVD track listing 1.恋してキメル! (PV)
"恋してキメル!" (Single); January 23, 2008; CRCP-10191	1. 恋してキメル!; 2. ラブタッチ; 3. 恋してキメル! (instrumental); 4. ラブタッチ (instrumental)
"Shi-Ru-Be" (Single); November 15, 2008	1. Shi-Ru-Be; 2. Imagination in the Dark
"Spiral" (Single); April 1, 2009	1. Spiral; 2. Beat a Path～承～
"Target" (Single); February 16, 2010	1. Target; 2. 21:20 - Another Story XX mix.; 3. Yes! Elephant - 2010 Slice mix 4. Ice - Lonely Hearts Club mix 5. Red Sparkle- Rolling Gt mix 6. Rouge/noir
"Zero & One" (Digital Download); June 15, 2013	1. Zero & One

=== Albums ===
Release	Track list
The Beginning (Mini-Album); November 27, 2003; NECA-30099	1. Decide: First Gate; 2. You Got Game?; 3. Feel My Soul: 闘いの中で; 4. Endless Pain; 5. Make You Free; 6. Key of Life; 7. Song for You: 愛すべき人へ K texture dub
Glorious (Album); December 7, 2005; CRCP-40132	1. 本能; 2. Be Shiny; 3. くちびるパッション; 4. Answer Will Come; 5. Overlap; 6. Love Bites; 7. 風が止むまで; 8. The Pleasure of Love; 9. ミラーボール; 10. Stand up!: Break Away; 11. Color
Galaxy Kiss (Album); January 10, 2007; CRCP-40169	1. Timeless; 2. サマーガール; 3. Style; 4. Starry Heavens; 5. 黒炎; 6. 水の記憶; 7. 恋のパフォーマンス: To Be with You; 8. Airline Kiss; 9. Dive into the Heart; 10. Letter; 11. Starry Heavens (”john Doe”mix); 12. Answer Will Come (O.S.R); 13. Be Shiny (Trident's”Rock-A-Head”mix); DVD track list: 1. Airline Kiss PV; 2. Mizu no Kioku PV; 3. Dive into the Heart PV (New, Multi-angled Version)
Galaxy Kiss (Album); January 10, 2007; CRCP-40170	01. Timeless; 02. サマーガール; 03. Style; 04. Starry Heavens; 05. 黒炎; 06. 水の記憶; 07. 恋のパフォーマンス: To Be with You; 08. Airline Kiss; 09. Dive into the Heart; 10. Letter; 11. Starry Heavens (”john Doe”mix); 12. Answer Will Come (O.S.R); 13. Be Shiny (Trident's”Rock-A-Head”mix); (Comes with special photobook)
Galaxy Kiss (Album); January 10, 2007; CRCP-40171	01. Timeless; 02. サマーガール; 03. Style; 04. Starry Heavens; 05. 黒炎; 06. 水の記憶; 07. 恋のパフォーマンス: To Be with You; 08. Airline Kiss; 09. Dive into the Heart; 10. Letter; 11. Starry Heavens (”john Doe”mix); 12. Answer Will Come (O.S.R); 13. Be Shiny (Trident's”Rock-A-Head”mix)
Kimeru (Album); June 16, 2008	01. With You; 02. 恋してキメル！; 03. 君じゃなきゃダメなんだ; 04. Regret; 05. ラブタッチ; 06. Junk Beat; 07. Marionette; 08. Rise; 09. Voyage; 10. Monopolize; 11. All the Time; 12. そのまま Danger Night; 13. Desire
Discover (Album); June 17, 2009	01. Discover; 02. Spiral; 03. Phoenix: Get a Chance; 04. Summer Rain; 05. Red Sparkle; 06. Ice; 07. Shi Ru Bi (Discover Mix); 08. Imagination in the Dark; 09. Trust; 10. 21-20; 11. Yes! Elephant; 12. No Fight No Life
Anatomize (Album); July 28, 2010	01. Moon Butterfly; 02. Deep Blue; 03. Final Round; 04. Crossing; 05. 4D; 06. Melkey; 07. Photosynthesis; 08. Five Senses; 09. Catharsis; 10. Like the Earth; 11. Circle of Us; 12. Anatomize
Pollux (Self-cover Album); July 13, 2011	01. Decade(SE); 02. Yes! Elephant; 03. Overlap; 04. ミラーボール; 05. PhotoSynthesis; 06. No Fight No Life; 07. The Pleasure of Love; 08. Be Shiny; 09. Pink; 10. You Got Game?; 11. Trace(新曲)

=== DVDS ===
Release	Track list
First Gate (DVD); August 25, 2004; MTBS-1001	1. Make You Free (PV); 2. You Got Game? (PV); 3. Overlap (PV); 4. ミラーボール (Live); 5. Make You Free: Style004, Live edition (Live); 6. Key of Life (Live); 7. You Got Game? (Live); 8. Feel My Soul: 闘いの中で (Live)
First Premium (DVD + Single); August 25, 2004; MTBS-9001	1. Make You Free (PV); 2. You Got Game? (PV); 3. Overlap (PV); 4. ミラーボール (Live); 5. Make You Free: Style004 Live edition (Live); 6. Key of Life (Live); 7. You Got Game? (Live); 8. Overlap (Live); Maxi Single; 1. Be Shiny; 2. ミラーボール; 3. Prism; 4. Beat a Path
K's Ark 2005... Live! (DVD); August 3, 2005; MTBS-1006	1. Decide: First Gate; 2. ミラーボール; 3. Prism; 4. Make You Free; 5. Overlap; 6. Oath in the Storm; 7. Endless Pain; 8. Chain of Mind; 9. Pink; 10. The Pleasure of Love; 11. Key of Life; 12. Be Shiny; 13. You Got Game?; 14. Beat a Path; 15. Feel My Soul: 闘いの中で; EN. You Got Game?
Glorious Films (DVD); April 19, 2006; CRBP-10041	1. 本能; 2. くちびるパッション; 3. Answer Will Come; 4. Overlap; 5. Love Bites; 6. ミラーボール; 7. 風が止むまで; 8. Stand Up!: Break Away; 9. Be Shiny; 10. The Pleasure of Love; 11. Color
Clips-K (DVD); August 16, 2006; CRBP-10044	1. Be Shiny (PV); 2. The Pleasure of Love (PV); 3. Answer will come (PV); 4. Love Bites (PV); 5. 恋のパフォーマンス (PV); 6. Style (Live)

== Tour history ==
Oneman Live "The Beginning"
December 6, 2003 - Harajuku Ruido 1st, Tokyo

Live "Overlap"
March 23, 2004 - Shibuya O-West, Tokyo

Kimeru Tour 2004 "Overlap"
April 24, 2004 - Ell.Fits All, Nagoya
April 25, 2004 - Osaka Muse, Osaka
May 5, 2004 - Shibuya O-East, Tokyo

Kimeru Tour 2004 "Be Shiny"
September 4, 2004 - E.L.L., Nagoya
September 5, 2004 - Big Cat, Osaka
September 11, 2004 - Shibuya O-East, Tokyo
November 3, 2004 - Shibuya-AX, Tokyo
November 7, 2004 - E.L.L., Nagoya
November 14 - Big Cat, Osaka

Kimeru Tout 2005 "Pleasure!"
February 27, 2005 - Shibuya-AX, Tokyo
March 5, 2005 - Ma.Ca.Na, Sendai
March 12, 2005 - E.L.L., Nagoya
March 13, 2005 - Big Cat, Osaka
March 21, 2005 - Drum Be-1, Fukuoka

K's Ark 2005
May 21, 2005 - Shibuya Public Hall, Tokyo

Kimeru-Land Summer Eruption 2005
August 6, 2005 - Drum Be-1, Fukuoka
August 7, 2005 - Namikijan Kushon, Hiroshima
August 13, 2005 - Big Cat, Osaka
August 20, 2005 - Shibuya-AX, Tokyo
August 21, 2005 - Shibuya-AX, Tokyo
August 28, 2005 - Club Junk Box, Sendai
September 3, 2005 - E.L.L., Nagoya
September 4, 2005 - E.L.L., Nagoya

Kimeru Tour 2006 "Glorious"
January 2, 2006 - Kouseinunkin Hall, Tokyo (New Years Special)
January 9, 2006 - Big Cat, Osaka
January 14, 2006 - Diamond Hall, Nagoya
January 21, 2006 - Club Junkbox, Sendai
January 22, 2006 - Club Junkbox, Niigata
January 28, 2006 - Namiki Junction, Hiroshima
January 29, 2006 - Drum Be-1, Fukuoka

Kimeru Tour 2006 "Beat Performance
April 19, 2006 - O-West, Tokyo (Release Special)
April 30, 2006 - Drum Logos, Fukuoka
May 1, 2006 - Namiki Junction, Hiroshima
May 3, 2006 - Big Cat, Osaka
May 4, 2006 - Diamond Hall, Nagoya
May 7, 2006 - Club Junk Box, Sendai
May 14, 2006 - Club Junk Box, Niigata
May 28, 2006 - Tokyo International Forum Hall C, Tokyo

Kimeru-Land Summer Dream 2006
July 22, 2006 - Shinkiba Studiocast, Tokyo

TSM PresentsR&R Newsmaker "Mix Up!" Vol.1
August 16, 2006 - Shibuya-AX, Tokyo

Dream Sonic 2006
October 29, 2006 - Big Cat, Osaka

Kimeru Tour 2006 "Starry & Timeless"
November 18, 2006 - Diamond Hall, Nagoya
November 19, 2006 - Big Cat, Osaka
November 23, 2006 - Namiki Junction, Hiroshima
November 25, 2006 - Drum Logos, Fukuoka
November 26, 2006 - Drum Be-9, Kumamoto
December 2, 2006 - Club Junk Box, Niigata
December 3, 2006 - Club Junk Box, Sendai
December 16, 2006 - Kouseinunkin Hall, Tokyo

== Stage Work ==
=== Musicals ===
Tenimyu: The Prince of Tennis Musical Series (as Shusuke Fuji, Ryoma Echizen u/s)

- The Prince of Tennis Musical - Shusuke Fuji (2003)
- The Prince of Tennis Musical: Remarkable 1st Match Fudomine - Ryoma Echizen (2003–2004)
- The Prince of Tennis Musical: Dream Live 1st - Shusuke Fuji (2004)
- The Prince of Tennis Musical: More Than Limit St. Rudolph Gakuen - Shusuke Fuji (2004)
- The Prince of Tennis Musical: Side Fudomine ~Special Match~ - Shusuke Fuji (In Winter of 2004-2005)
- The Prince of Tennis Musical: Dream Live 7th - Shusuke Fuji (2010)
- "The Prince of Tennis Musical": Dream Live 2013 - Shusuke Fuji (2013)

Rock'n Jam Musical

- Rock'n Jam Musical I (2004)
- Rock'n Jam Musical I - Saien (2005)
- Rock'n Jam Musical II (2009)
- Rock'n Jam Musical III (2010)

Other works

- Pippin - Pippin (2007, shared with Hiroki Aiba)
- Titanic - Jim Farrell (2009)
- Magdala na Maria 2 - Angela (2009)
- Shounen Hollywood - Hiroshi Sakuragi (2011)
- Chō Kageki Bakumatsu Rock: Tokugawa Yoshinobu (2014)
- Katekyō Hitman REBORN! the STAGE - Lambo (2018)
- Katekyō Hitman REBORN! the STAGE -vs. VARIA part I- - Lambo (2019)
- Katekyō Hitman REBORN! the STAGE -vs. VARIA part II- - Lambo (2020)
