= Power Scale =

Studio album by Iceman
- Released: March 26, 1997
- Genre: Pop, pop rock, electropop, dance-pop
- Length: 56:40
- Label: Antinos Records
- Producer: Daisuke Asakura

Iceman chronology
Power Scale (1997)	Digiryzm Mutation (1998)

Power Scale is the first album released by Japanese pop rock trio Iceman on March 26, 1997.

== Track listing ==
All music is composed by Daisuke Asakura, except track 5 (Kenichi Ito).

No.	Title	Length
1.	"Dark Half ~Touch Your Darkness~"	4:53
2.	"Something feel like Heaven"	4:46
3.	"Nartic Boy"	5:59
4.	"reimei -Reimei-" (黎明-Reimei-)	5:34
5.	"Mr.D"	4:56
6.	"White Fusion" (White Fusion～仮想恋愛の手引き)	7:06
7.	"Dear My Friend -Make Your Shine Way-"	4:08
8.	"Furiitaa Buruusu" (フリーターブルース)	5:17
9.	"Breathless Night Slider"	4:10
10.	"Edge of the Season"	5:11
11.	"Ice Breaker"	5:52
