= Daisuke Asakura =

Japanese musician (born 1967)

Daisuke Asakura 浅倉 大介
- Also known as: DA, Dai-chan, Scorpion
- Born: November 4, 1967 (age 58); Tokyo, Japan
- Origin: Japan
- Genres: J-pop; electronica; synthpop
- Occupations: Musician; songwriter; producer
- Instruments: Synthesizer; piano; keytar; guitar synthesizer
- Years active: 1985–present
- Labels: Darwin Records (private label); Sony Music Japan
- Member of: Access; Pandora
- Formerly of: Iceman
- Website: danet.ne.jp

Daisuke Asakura (浅倉 大介, Asakura Daisuke; born November 4, 1967) is a Japanese musician, songwriter and producer who is known for his compositional work and skill at keyboards.

== Early life and career ==
Asakura's childhood consisted of piano and electronic organ lessons, though he was expected to follow the family trade of plumbing. He started working with Yamaha keyboards and synthesizers in his early teens. Asakura began his career with a job at Yamaha right after finishing high school. While at Yamaha, Asakura worked on the EOS synthesiser, and was also featured in the instructional video for the SY77. His talent was discovered by Tetsuya Komuro of TM Network and Asakura was pulled from Yamaha to work under Komuro as his protégé. Subsequently, Asakura played the bass synthesizer during TM Network's 1990–91 Rhythm Red tour. In 1992, Asakura met the vocalist Hiroyuki Takami and featured him in some of his solo work. The two eventually formed Access (or "AXS") in 1992, after Asakura broke away from TM Network. He and Takami split up in 1995.

The breakup of Access left Asakura open to pursue different projects that included composing and producing songs for new artists; one of the most successful acts he created was J-pop idol Takanori Nishikawa under the title of T.M.Revolution (also known as "TMR"). In the middle of 1996, Asakura started a three-man unit titled Iceman which brought Kenichi Ito (guitar) and Michihiro Kuroda (vocals) to the spotlight. After a few years, Iceman ended activity.

== Other projects ==
During and after his years with Iceman, Asakura built his wealth and reputation as a composer taking after his idol and teacher, Tetsuya Komuro. He produced singles and albums for various J-Pop vocalists. He was also the featured music composer for the anime series Gravitation. Examples of Asakura's past projects includes vocalists such as Yosuke Sakanoue, Kinya Kotani, Daichi Kuroda, Akiko Hinagata, Yuki Kimura, FayRay, Takashi Fujii and groups such as, Onapetz, Pool Bit Boys, Lazy Knack, Run&Gun and The Seeker. He also composed songs for artists such as the visual kei rock band Shazna.

In 1999, Asakura and Takanori Nishikawa formed their own official two-man unit, The End of Genesis T.M.R. evolution Turbo Type D (or "TMR-e", for short). They produced three singles and one album together, with Asakura performing alongside Nishikawa and appearing in their music videos. The project was officially ended in April 2000 when Nishikawa reverted to his original stage name of T.M.Revolution. Asakura is still TMR's primary songwriter.

In 2001, Asakura produced his first solo album in five years and worked with Iceman guitarist Kenichi Ito in Mad Soldiers; a sort of comedic spin-off from Iceman in which both men's "sinister" alter egos "Scorpion" (Asakura) and "Snake" (Ito) produced music for Kinya Kotani, amongst others, and performed officially unrecorded cover versions of famous songs such as "Lemon Tea" by Sheena & The Rokkets and "Hungry Like the Wolf" by Duran Duran. The name of Asakura's alter ego is a reference to his zodiac sign, Scorpio.

In 2002, he reunited with Hiroyuki Takami and reformed Access.

Asakura went off on a solo project in 2004 titled "Quantum Mechanics Rainbow", in which he released multiple CDs for a year, and each CD title referenced both a color and math property. The project featured multiple live performances and subsequent DVD releases. In 2006–2007, Asakura produced two singles for new J-pop idol Kimeru, hit the road with TM Network for 2007's TMN Tribute tour and created new songs for the newest version of the popular dance-step game, Dance Dance Revolution. In November 2007, Access released a memory/discography book, alongside highly coveted Access plushies, to commemorate their 15th anniversary. In 2012, Access celebrated their 20th anniversary. In 2008, Asakura started a new solo project entitled "DA Metaverse ~100 Songs for 1000 Days," in which he would release 100 new songs over the course of 1000 days exclusively through iTunes. The project was launched on June 25, 2008. In 2009 he composed and produced the soundtrack for the anime adaptation of Chrome Shelled Regios. Also in 2009, Asakura composed and arranged the soundtrack for a musical rendition of Goodbye Charlie in which Hiroyuki Takami played one of the lead roles.

Asakura has worked with J-pop artists such as Daisy x Daisy (for the opening theme song to Chrome Shelled Regios), On/Off, and May'n as a composer and/or producer. He was also featured as an MC/performer for the event concert series, "Girl's Factory", alongside Mayu Watanabe of AKB48 and various guest artists. Since 2006, Asakura has been a member of the Domoto Bros. Band on the music TV series Shin Domoto Kyoudai ("New Domoto Brothers"), hosted by the duo of KinKi Kids, as a keyboardist. Asakura formed a group with other musicians from the show's band in 2009 called "Sugar and the Honey Tones", and they have produced one album. Asakura and Komuro formed the unit Pandora in 2017, having produced one mini-album, including a track featuring the artist Beverly, "Be the One", for the Japanese tokusatsu show Kamen Rider Build. They broke up in 2018 due to Komuro's retirement but later reformed in 2025.

Asakura was featured in his own radio talk show, Neo Age Circuit, which aired every Saturday at 11pm (JST) on FM Nack5 79.5 until it ended in March 2021. His official fanclub, "Smile", was temporarily the official fanclub for Access until their breakup in 1995. It was active in relation to Asakura's activities until March 2021.

== Discography ==
=== Singles ===
- Cosmic Runaway (February 1, 1995)
- Siren's Melody (May 10, 1995)
- Black or White? (May 25, 1995)
- Rainy Heart – Doshaburi no Omoide no Naka (June 10, 1995)

=== DA Metaverse ===
- Dream Ape Metaverse (June 25, 2008)
- Repli Eye-Program"d (June 25, 2008)
- Nothung Syndrome (June 25, 2008)
- Ya･Ti･Ma (July 30, 2008)
- Sonic Cruise (September 24, 2008)
- So・U・Shu・Tsu – mould (November 12, 2008)
- Fall Fear (November 12, 2008)
- Leaf Fall (November 12, 2008)
- The Transmuters (November 19, 2008)
- 創出 (Soushutsu) (November 19, 2008)
- Kiss For Salome (November 19, 2008)
- Chimera Draft (November 26, 2008)
- Star Cascade (November 26, 2008)
- Gate I (November 26, 2008)
- X-Night (December 17, 2008)
- Der Rattenfänger Von Hameln (January 7, 2009)
- Fractal Vibe (February 25, 2009)
- St. Electric (March 4, 2009)
- 'Blanca' (April 29, 2009)
- Rip (June 10, 2009)
- Prime Diffusion (June 17, 2009)
- Sphere Valley (June 24, 2009)
- A Midsummer Night's Dream (July 1, 2009)
- YaTa-Raven Chronicle (December 2, 2009)
- Space Closer (December 16, 2009)
- 3x10^8 Lucks (November 5, 2014)
- Topology (November 12, 2014)
- 0 Game (November 19, 2014)
- Ambition Rising (January 21, 2015)
- Grid Justice (January 21, 2015)
- Remote Space (February 25, 2015)
- March Hare (March 25, 2015)
- Danteroid (December 11, 2015)
- Coda Growth (January 29, 2020)
- Meme Crack - Growth20 (February 29, 2020)
- Wavelet Petal (March 29, 2020)
- Entanglement Capriccio (May 11, 2020)
- Olympus (October 2, 2020)

=== Albums ===
- Landing Timemachine (October 25, 1991)
- D-Trick (September 2, 1992)
- Electromancer (July 12, 1995)
- 21st Fortune CD (November 20, 2002)
- Quantum Mechanics Rainbow I : Violet Meme (March 30, 2004)
- Quantum Mechanics Rainbow II : Indigo Algorithm (May 31, 2004)
- Quantum Mechanics Rainbow III: Blue Resolution (July 30, 2004)
- Quantum Mechanics Rainbow IV : Green Method (September 15, 2004)
- Quantum Mechanics Rainbow V : Yellow Vector (November 30, 2004)
- Quantum Mechanics Rainbow VI : Orange Compile (December 31, 2004)
- Quantum Mechanics Rainbow VII: Red Trigger (March 30, 2005)
- d・file -for TV programs- (July 19, 2006)

=== Compilations ===
- DA's Best Works '91–'95 (June 24, 1998)
- DecAde: The Best of Daisuke Asakura (November 21, 2001) (July 1, 2002)
- D・Collection: The Best Works of Daisuke Asakura (July 19, 2007)
- DA METAVERSE I + II (March 8, 2013)

=== Soundtrack albums ===
- Daiva (November 4, 1992)
- Dance Dance Revolution SuperNOVA 2
- Gravitation (Anime OST)
- Koukaku no Regios : Sound Restoration
- Koukaku no Regios : Sound Restoration 2

=== Remix albums ===
- Sequence Virus 2003 (December 20, 2003)
- Sequence Virus 2004 (August 14, 2004)
- Sequence Virus 2005 (October 17, 2005)
- Sequence Virus 2006 (December 23, 2006)
- Sequence Virus 2007–2008 (July 25, 2008)
- Sequence Virus 2009 (March 31, 2010)
- Sequence Virus 2015 (June 29, 2016)
- Sequence Virus 2017 (August 29, 2018)
- Sequence Virus 2019 (May 13, 2020)

=== DVD ===
- 21st Fortune Complete Box (September 19, 2002)
- 21st Fortune DVD (November 20, 2002)
- Daisuke Asakura Live Tour'04 Cultivate Meme: About Quantum Mechanics Rainbow (March 4, 2005)
- Daisuke Asakura Quantum Mechanics Rainbow (October 17, 2005)
- Drive Meme-over Quantum Mechanics Rainbow- (March 20, 2006)
- D-Clips

=== Tour ===
- Electric Romance (December 14, 1995) to (January 9, 1996)
- Quantum Mechanics Rainbow (2004–2005)
