= D-File: For TV Programs =

d・file -for tv programs-

EP by Daisuke Asakura
- Released: July 19, 2006
- Genres: Pop, Synthpop, Techno, Electronica, Dance
- Length: 16:00
- Label: Darwin Records
- Producer: Daisuke Asakura

Daisuke Asakura chronology
Red Trigger -Aka no Yuuhatsu Omoi Douki- (2005)	d・file -for tv programs- (2006)

d・file -for tv programs-, is the thirteenth solo album from Japanese musician Daisuke Asakura released on July 19, 2006. According to the title, each track on the album was used in a Japanese television program, but it has never been specified by Asakura in exactly which television programs the tracks were used.

== Track listing ==
#	Title	Length
1	"primitive ark"	1:57
2	"approach to memories"	2:00
3	"Lady Wild"	2:34
4	"honest place"	0:39
5	"for ovation"	2:21
6	"T-cup swinging "	1:18
7	"pure segment"	5:11

All songs produced, composed and arranged by Daisuke Asakura.
