= Green Method (Midori no Chuuyou Chitsujyo Kei) =

Green Method -Midori no Chuuyou Chitsuyo Kei-

Studio album by Daisuke Asakura
- Released: September 15, 2004
- Genre: Pop, Synthpop, Techno, Electronica, Dance
- Label: Darwin Records
- Producer: Daisuke Asakura

Daisuke Asakura chronology
Blue Resolution -Ao no Shikaku Kaiseki do - (2004)	Green Method -Midori no Chuuyou Chitsuyo Kei- (2004)	Yellow Vector - Ki no Taji Gen Shikousei- (2004)

Green Method -Midori no Chuuyou Chitsuyo Kei- (Green Method-緑の中庸秩序系-), also known as Quantum Mechanics Rainbow IV: Green Method, is the ninth solo album from Japanese musician Daisuke Asakura released on September 15, 2004.

The album is the fourth in the Quantum Mechanics Rainbow series. The concept of this series is "one album for every rainbow color and a different Quantum Mechanics term".

== Track listing ==
#	Title	Length	Lyrics	Vocals
1	"The forbidden fruit -kindan no mi-"	3:02
2	"Personal Safety"	6:00	Makoto Asakura	Mayumi Fujita
3	"Quantum Mechanics Rainbow IV	4:23
4	"Trick Scan -chloroplast ver.-	6:13
5	Jade of sorrow	10:32	Akio Inoue	Tomoyuu Togari
6	étudeon G-String	2:26
7	Paranoia Method	10:35	Makoto Asakura	Mai Hashimoto
8	The Garden of Eden -Adam and Eve-	3:12

- All songs produced, composed and arranged by Daisuke Asakura. Guest rap on track 5 by HIDE (Dt.).
