= Pokémon Ranger and the Temple of the Sea =

2006 film by Kunihiko Yuyama

- Theatrical release poster

Japanese name
- Kanji: 劇場版ポケットモンスターアドバンスジェネレーション ポケモンレンジャーと蒼海の王子 マナフィ
- Literal meaning: Pocket Monsters Advanced Generation the Movie: Pokémon Ranger and the Prince of the Sea: Manaphy
Transcriptions
- Revised Hepburn: Gekijō-ban Pokettomonsutā Adobansu Jenerēshon Pokemon Renjā to Umi no Ōji Manafi
- Directed by: Kunihiko Yuyama
- Screenplay by: Hideki Sonoda
- Based on: Pokémon by Satoshi Tajiri
- Produced by: Choji Yoshikawa; Yukako Matsusako; Junya Okamoto; Takemoto Mori
- Starring: see below
- Cinematography: Takaya Mizutani
- Edited by: Toshio Henmi
- Music by: Shinji Miyazaki
- Production companies: OLM, Inc. OLM Digital
- Distributed by: Toho
- Release date: July 15, 2006 (Japan)
- Running time: 107 minutes
- Country: Japan
- Language: Japanese
- Box office: ¥3.4 billion

Pokémon Ranger and the Temple of the Sea (Note: Pocket Monsters Advanced Generation the Movie: Pokémon Ranger and the Prince of the Sea: Manaphy (Japanese: 劇場版ポケットモンスターアドバンスジェネレーション ポケモンレンジャーと蒼海の王子 マナフィ, Hepburn: Gekijōban Poketto Monsutā Adobansu Jenerēshon Pokemon Renjā to Umi no Ōji Manafi)) is a 2006 Japanese animated fantasy film. It is the ninth film of the Pokémon anime series and the fourth and final film of Pokémon the Series: Ruby and Sapphire. Directed by Kunihiko Yuyama and written by Hideki Sonoda, the film follows Ash Ketchum, his Pokémon partner Pikachu, and their friends May, Max and Brock as they help a Pokémon Ranger named Jack Walker deliver the Mythical Pokémon Manaphy to an undersea palace called Samiya while evading mercenaries led by Phantom the Pirate.

It was released on July 16, 2006, in Japan, to mixed reviews from critics and aired on Cartoon Network in North America on March 23, 2007. It is also the first Pokémon movie to not be dubbed in English by 4Kids Entertainment, but instead by The Pokemon Company International. The events of the film take place during Pokémon: Battle Frontier.

== Plot ==
An egg containing the Mythical Pokémon Manaphy is found floating in the sea by mercenary Phantom the Pirate, but it is subsequently stolen from him by Jack "Jackie" Walker, a Pokémon Ranger disguised as one of Phantom's crew members. Jackie escapes Phantom's ship and joins the Marina Group, a traveling circus family that specializes in Water-type Pokémon, to deliver the Manaphy egg to Samiya, an undersea palace built by the People of the Water, whom the Marina Group are descendants of. Ash Ketchum, May, Max, and Brock become lost on their journey and encounter the Marina Group in their search for water, inadvertently becoming involved with Jackie's mission.

When Team Rocket tips off the egg's location, Phantom pursues the group, during which Manaphy hatches in May's arms and implants her as its mother. The group escapes Phantom through a network of ruins belonging to the People of the Water, where Ash and his friends learn about Samiya. Jackie refuses Ash and his friends' further involvement with his mission and departs in a boat with the Marina Group toward Samiya. However, Manaphy starts crying without May, forcing Ash and his friends along. Manaphy's natural instincts lead the boat toward Samiya, and to Jackie's dismay, May and Manaphy bond closer. Jackie warns May of Manaphy's destiny to become Samiya's leader and that she will eventually need to let it go. May understands, but is distraught nonetheless, and Lizabeth, the Marina Group's daughter, comforts May and gives her a bracelet known as the People of the Water's Mark as a memento of her time with Manaphy. When May loses her bandanna to the wind, Manaphy embarks far into the ocean to retrieve it. Ash and his friends, board a submarine operated by Lizabeth to search for Manaphy, eventually finding it along with Samiya during a lunar eclipse. Unbeknownst to them, Phantom has been in pursuit.

While exploring Samiya, the group encounters Phantom, who is able to open the chamber to the Sea Crown, the temple's central artifact consisting of numerous large jewels. Phantom begins to remove the jewels, causing Samiya to flood and sink deeper into the ocean. The group escapes to the submarine while Jackie confronts Phantom, reconnecting most of the jewels to the crown before he, Phantom, and one of the jewels are washed away by the flood. Determined to save its home, Manaphy returns to the Crown's chamber with Ash, Pikachu, and May in tow, while Lizabeth, Brock, and Max are forced to depart in the submarine. Ash and May reconnect the remaining jewels but notice one is missing. While escaping the flood, Ash finds the last jewel in a fountain. He puts Pikachu, May, and Manaphy in an air capsule that was part of Phantom's submarine before diving into the completely flooded crown chamber and reconnecting the jewel, causing Samiya to rise to the ocean's surface.

While May and Pikachu mourn Ash's apparent sacrifice, Phantom suddenly appears and kidnaps Manaphy. Ash, surrounded by a glowing aura from the rebuilt Sea Crown, pursues Phantom and retrieves Manaphy. Phantom returns with his ship but Manaphy leads a counterattack with several wild Water-type Pokémon, including the Legendary Pokémon Kyogre. With Phantom subdued, Jackie is able to deliver Manaphy safely to Samiya, completing his mission. May and Manaphy share a heartfelt farewell before the group watches Samiya return to depths of the ocean. Phantom is arrested while Ash and his friends part ways from Jackie and the Marina Group and continue on their journey.

== Voice cast ==
Character	Japanese	English
Ash	Rica Matsumoto	Sarah Natochenny
May	Kaori Suzuki	Michele Knotz
Max	Kyoko Yamada	Kayzie Rogers
Brock	Yuji Ueda	Bill Rogers
Pikachu	Ikue Ōtani	Ikue Ōtani
Jessie	Megumi Hayashibara	Michele Knotz
James	Shin'ichirō Miki	James Carter Cathcart
Meowth	Inuko Inuyama	James Carter Cathcart
Wobbuffet	Yūji Ueda	Kayzie Rogers
Jack Walker	Kōichi Yamadera	Rich McNanna
The Phantom	Hiroshi Fujioka	Eric Schussler
Lizabeth	Kaori Manabe	Emily Williams
Judy	Becky	Rhonda Krempa
Manaphy	Yuri Shiratori	Michele Knotz
Narrator	Unshō Ishizuka	Rodger Parsons

== Production ==
On December 9, 2005, the title for the ninth Pokémon feature film was revealed to be Pokémon Ranger and the Prince of the Sea in the Japanese children's program Oha Suta on TV Tokyo. Setting designs were inspired by cities and ruins in Italy, particularly in Rome, Naples, and Capri.

=== Music ===
Pocket Monsters AG the Movie: Pokémon Ranger and the Prince of the Sea: Manaphy Music Collection

Film score by Shinji Miyazaki
- Released: July 26, 2006
- Genre: Soundtrack
- Length: 61 minutes
- Label: Media Factory, Inc.
- Producers: Kazuo Shinohara; Yūji Saitō

Shinji Miyazaki, the composer for the Pokémon television series, also composed the score for Pokémon Ranger. The film's soundtrack was released on July 26, 2006.

Track listing

All music is composed by Shinji Miyazaki, except where noted.

No.	Title	Length
1.	"海のポケモン達"	1:01
2.	"ファントム登場"	1:33
3.	"ポケモンレンジャー登場!! 〜ミッション・オブ・EOP〜"	3:13
4.	"劇場タイトルテーマ2006" (Junichi Masuda, arr. Miyazaki)	1:09
5.	"オープニング 〜水中ポケモンショー〜"	2:43
6.	"ハルカの夢"	1:22
7.	"オニドリル 〜キャプチャオン〜"	1:47
8.	"ファントムトループ来襲!!"	3:39
9.	"水の民の遺跡"	2:08
10.	"レジェンド・オブ・アクーシャ"	1:12
11.	"野望に向かって"	1:55
12.	"若さとは冒険をためらわないこと"	1:57
13.	"出発!航海へ!"	3:30
14.	"それぞれの思い" (Hirokazu Tanaka, arr. Miyazaki)	2:31
15.	"マナフィのために"	1:10
16.	"マナフィと遊ぼう!"	1:35
17.	"マナフィを探せ!!"	1:34
18.	"海の神殿アクーシャ"	1:02
19.	"神殿のワルツ"	2:12
20.	"海の王冠へ"	2:04
21.	"沈みだす神殿"	2:25
22.	"神殿を救え!!"	1:17
23.	"息の続く限り..."	2:51
24.	"海の王冠に抱かれて"	2:05
25.	"光の戦士サトシ"	1:56
26.	"水の民のカーニバル"	2:11
27.	"蒼海の王子"	1:57
28.	"守るべきもの（映画バージョン）" (Yoshihiko Nishio, arr. L.O.E.)	3:33
29.	"スパート!（TVバージョン）" (Shōgo Toda, Hirokazu Tanaka)	1:33
30.	"ビッグ・ニャース・ディ（映画バージョン）" (Pikachū Gakugeibu, Kazumi Mitome)	2:19

== Release ==
=== Theatrical run ===
Pokémon Ranger and the Temple of the Sea was released in Japan on July 15, 2006, with a 105 minute running time. The film was distributed by Toho in Japan.

=== TV broadcast ===
In North America, Pokémon Ranger and the Temple of the Sea was aired on Cartoon Network on March 23, 2007.

=== Home media ===
The original Japanese version of the film was released on DVD on December 22, 2006. The English dub was first released in North America on April 3, 2007. It was later released in Australia nearly a year later, on February 6, 2008. The American set included the Pikachu short Pikachu's Island Adventure (ピカチュウのわんぱくアイランド, Pikachū no Wanpaku Airando), which was previously shown in August 2006 as an exclusive in-flight short film on the Pokémon Jet of All Nippon Airways (ANA).

The film wasn't released on DVD in the UK but it did get an iTunes Store release.

== Reception ==
=== Box office performance ===
The general screening of Pokémon Ranger and the Prince of the Sea: Manaphy ran for 6 weeks, from July 15 to August 25, 2006.

1. July 15–16, 2nd overall, 2nd domestic, 1st anime
2. July 22–23, 3rd overall, 2nd domestic, 1st anime
3. July 29–30, 4th overall, 3rd domestic, 2nd anime
4. August 5–6, 5th overall, 4th domestic, 2nd anime
5. August 12–13, 4th overall, 3rd domestic, 2nd anime
6. August 19–20, 6th overall, 4th domestic, 2nd anime

=== Critical reception ===
Pokémon Ranger and the Prince of the Sea received mixed reviews.
