= Blue Resolution (Ao no Shikaku Kaiseki do) =

Blue Resolution -Ao no Shikaku Kaiseki do-

Studio album by Daisuke Asakura
- Released: July 30, 2004
- Genres: Pop, Synthpop, Techno, Electronica, Dance
- Length: 35:00
- Label: Darwin Records
- Producer: Daisuke Asakura

Daisuke Asakura chronology
Indigo Algorithm -Ai no Denshi Kisuuhou- (2004)	Blue Resolution -Ao no Shikaku Kaiseki do- (2004)	Green Method -Midori no Chuuyou Chitsujyo Kei- (2004)

Blue Resolution -Ao no Shikaku Kaiseki do- (Blue Resolution－青の思覚解析度－), also known as Quantum Mechanics Rainbow III: Blue Resolution, is the eighth (seventh of entirely new music) solo album by artist Daisuke Asakura. It is the third in a series of seven albums released by Asakura in 2004, called Quantum Mechanics Rainbow. Each album revolves around a different color of the rainbow and a different term relating to Quantum Mechanics. This album revolves around the color blue. It also contains guest vocals by Mayumi Fujita (Track 5).

== Track listing ==
#	Title	Length	Lyrics
1	"Tyltyl -omoide no kuni-"	3:39
2	"Quantum Mechanics Rainbow III"	4:27
3	"'Deep Blue' Resolution"	5:18	Makoto Asakura
4	"cobalt shore"	2:25
5	"BLUE SKY BLUE"	4:09	Akio Inoue
6	"étude on A-String"	2:26
7	"Replicate VIRUS -Blu-ray ver.-"	3:48
8	"hikokigumo"	1:39
9	"Aoi Hana -Heinrich von Ofterdigen-" (青い花-Heinrich von Ofterdigen-)	2:00	Makoto Asakura
10	"Mytyl -mirai no kuni-"	5:28

- All songs produced, composed and arranged by Daisuke Asakura
