= Yellow Vector (Ki no Taji Gen Shikousei) =

Yellow Vector - Ki no Taji Gen Shikousei-

Studio album by Daisuke Asakura
- Released: November 30, 2004
- Genre: Pop, Synthpop, Techno, Electronica, Dance
- Length: 41:00
- Label: Darwin Records
- Producer: Daisuke Asakura

Daisuke Asakura chronology
| Green Method -Midori no Chuuyou Chitsujyo Kei- (2004) | Yellow Vector - Ki no Taji Gen Shikousei- (2004) | Orange Compile -Daidai no Noudou Hensekishiki- (2004) |

Yellow Vector – Ki no Taji Gen Shikousei- (Yellow Vector－黄の多次限指向性-), also known as Quantum Mechanics Rainbow V: Yellow Vector, is the tenth solo album from Japanese musician Daisuke Asakura released on November 30, 2004. The album is the fifth in the Quantum Mechanics Rainbow series. The concept of this series is "one album for every rainbow color and a different Quantum Mechanics term". Track 7 is dedicated to D.A.N.K, a boy band Asakura formed in a futile attempt to copy the popularity of Japanese music company Johnny’s Entertainment Company. Tracks 1 and 8 make references to physicist Erwin Schrödinger and mathematician Pierre-Simon Laplace, respectively. Track 5 contains guest vocals from Mayumi Fujita, who has performed vocals on several of Asakura’s Quantum Mechanics Rainbow albums.

== Track listing ==
| # | Title | Length | Lyrics | Vocals |
|---|---|---|---|---|
| 1 | "Schrodinger‘s Cat" | 2:54 |
| 2 | "Quantum Mechanics Rainbow V" | 4:13 |
| 3 | "Venus Vector" | 10:57 |
| 4 | "etude on F-string" | 4:11 |
| 5 | "Star Yellow X’mas" | 4:49 | | Mayumi Fujita |
| 6 | "Puppet Master" | 5:38 | Makoto Asakura | Daisuke Asakura |
| 7 | Le Petit Prince -le renard dore ver.- | 5:16 |
| 8 | Laplace’s Devil | 3:35 |

- All songs produced, composed and arranged by Daisuke Asakura.
