= Koishite Kimeru! =

Single by Kimeru
- Released: January 23, 2008
- Genre: J-pop
- Length: ??:??
- Label: Nippon Crown Records JP
- Songwriter(s): ROLLY

Alternative cover
- B type cover.

Koishite Kimeru! (恋してキメル！, Kimeru is in Love!) is a single by the pop vocalist Kimeru and was used as the fourth and final closing theme for the Japanese dub of the 2003 Ninja Turtles series. It was written and composed by "ROLLY". It was released by Nippon Crown Records in maxi and CD/DVD combo formats on January 23, 2008 in Japan only and is coupled with the song "Love Touch". The song would peak at 80 on Oricon.

== Track listing ==
1. 恋してキメル!
  Koishite Kimeru!/Kimeru is in Love!
2. ラブタッチ
  Rabu Tacchi/Love Touch
3. 恋してキメル!(instrumental)
  Koishite Kimeru! (instrumental)/Kimeru is in Love! (Instrumental)
4. ラブタッチ(instrumental)
  Rabu Tacchi (instrumental)/Love Touch (Instrumental)
