= Red Trigger (Aka no Yuuhatsu Omoi Douki) =

Red Trigger -Aka no Yuuhatsu Shidouki-

Studio album by Daisuke Asakura
- Released: March 3, 2005
- Genre: Pop, Synthpop, Techno, Electronica, Dance
- Length: 53:00
- Label: Darwin Records
- Producer: Daisuke Asakura

Daisuke Asakura chronology
Orange Compile -Daidai no Noudou Hensekishiki- (2004)	Red Trigger -Aka no Yuuhatsu Shidouki- (2005)	d・file -for TV programs- (2006)

Red Trigger -Aka no Yuuhatsu Shidouki- (Red Trigger－赤の誘発思動期－), also known as Quantum Mechanics Rainbow VII: Red Trigger, is the twelfth solo album from Japanese musician Daisuke Asakura released on March 3, 2005. The album is the seventh and final in the Quantum Mechanics Rainbow series. The concept of this series is "one album for every rainbow color and a different Quantum Mechanics term".

== Track listing ==
#	Title	Length	Lyrics	Vocals
1	"Phoenix -su·za·ku-"	3:41
2	"Rose Line"	9:44
3	"Sistema Sol"	9:25		Daisuke Asakura
4	"etude on E-string "	3:23
5	"Embryonic Trigger"	3:44
6	"Red Coder “anemone“"	5:23		Daisuke Asakura
7	"Quantum Mechanics Rainbow VII"	5:44
8	"Message from 7 Lights"	5:18		Daisuke Asakura
9	"Dragon -hi·ryu-"	2:58
10	"IRIS"	5:15

- All songs produced, composed and arranged by Daisuke Asakura.
