= Digiryzm Mutation =

Studio album by Iceman
- Released: May 21, 1998
- Genres: Pop, pop rock, electropop, dance-pop
- Length: 54:00
- Label: Antinos Records
- Producer: Daisuke Asakura

Iceman chronology
Power Scale (1997)	Digiryzm Mutation (1998)	Gate II (1999)

Digiryzm Mutation is the second album released by the Japanese pop rock trio Iceman on May 21, 1998.

== Track listing ==
All music is composed by Daisuke Asakura, except track 4 (Kenichi Ito).

No.	Title	Length
1.	"L.a.r.v.a.e"	1:08
2.	"Cyclone Mutant"	4:28
3.	"8 banme no tsumi~Compressed Mix" (8番目の罪 ～Compressed Mix)	3:59
4.	"Beauty Site"	5:34
5.	"tearless" (tearless ～あの頃の君を探して)	5:39
6.	"SweetJank, SweetGap"	4:30
7.	"Harmit & Milk"	4:33
8.	"E.v.o.l.u.t.i.o.n"	2:56
9.	"Galaxy Gang~Compressed Mix"	3:52
10.	"Final Prayer"	4:12
11.	"Beat My Life"	3:50
12.	"Image of Tomorrow"	4:30
13.	"Lost Complex~Compressed Mix"	4:50
14.	"W.o.r.l.d Λ"	1:03

== Personnel ==
- Daisuke Asakura – keyboards
- Kenichi Ito – guitar
- Michihiro Kuroda – lead vocals
