= Gate I =

Studio album by Iceman
- Released: July 7, 1999
- Genre: Pop, pop rock, electropop, dance-pop
- Length: 46:00
- Label: Antinos Records
- Producer: Daisuke Asakura

Iceman chronology
Gate II (1998)	Gate I (1999)	Gate//White (1999)

Gate I is the fourth album released by Japanese pop rock trio Iceman. It was released on May 21, 1998. It is also the second in a small series of albums released by Iceman from 1999 until their official departure from the Japanese music scene in 2003. This series includes three studio albums (Gate II, Gate I, and Gate//White), as well as 1 remix album and 1 “analog” album (gate out - 1st remix album and gate out - 1st analog album, respectively). Track 8 on this album, “Gate I”, was also rerecorded by Daisuke Asakura and released as a single, being part of his 2008 project “Da Metaverse ~100 songs for 1000 days~".

== Track listing ==
All music is composed by Daisuke Asakura, except tracks 3 and 6 (Kenichi Ito).

No.	Title	Length
1.	"That’s Black Gate"	0:44
2.	"Strike Back of Psyco"	4:54
3.	"Deep Wild" (Deep Wild ～幻覚地帯に於ける深海にて～)	4:37
4.	"Last Wild Wind"	5:47
5.	"In The Black Hole"	5:05
6.	"Devil Cry-Max"	5:20
7.	"Eyes Bright"	4:55
8.	"Gate I - Gate Odyssey"	7:59
9.	"For the Next Gate from Black"	1:58
