= Orange Compile (Daidai no Noudou Hensekishiki) =

Orange Compile -Daidai no Noudou Hensekishiki-

Studio album by Daisuke Asakura
- Released: December 31, 2004
- Genres: Pop, Synthpop, Techno, Electronica, Dance
- Length: 29:00
- Label: Darwin Records
- Producer: Daisuke Asakura

Daisuke Asakura chronology
Yellow Vector - Ki no Taji Gen Shikousei- (2004)	Orange Compile -Daidai no Noudou Hensekishiki- (2004)	Red Trigger -Aka no Yuuhatsu Omoi Douki- (2005)

Orange Compile -Daidai no Noudou Hensekishiki- (Orange Compile -橙の能動編積式-), also known as Quantum Mechanics Rainbow VI: Orange Compile, is the eleventh solo album from Japanese musician Daisuke Asakura released on December 31, 2004. The album is the sixth in the Quantum Mechanics Rainbow series. The concept of this series is "one album for every rainbow color and a different Quantum Mechanics term".

== Track listing ==
#	Title	Length	Lyrics	Vocals
1	"Petitgrain Mandarin"	1:47
2	"Orange Tea Time"	5:01	Makoto Asakura	Daisuke Asakura
3	"Platonic Compile"	4:13
4	"#CaCO3"	2:59
5	"etude on B-string"	2:03
6	"#CaSO4"	1:12
7	"Antares Pain"	5:16		Daisuke Asakura
8	"Quantum Mechanics Rainbow VI"	5:18
9	"Neroli Bigarade"	2:18	-

- All songs produced, composed and arranged by Daisuke Asakura.
