= Violet Meme (Murasaki no Jyouhoudentatsu Chi) =

Violet Meme -Murasaki no Jyouhoudentatsu Chi-

Studio album by Daisuke Asakura
- Released: March 30, 2004
- Genre: pop, Synthpop, Techno, Electronica, Dance
- Length: 38:00
- Label: Darwin Records
- Producer: Daisuke Asakura

Daisuke Asakura chronology
CLUB MIX Album: Sequence Virus 2003 (2003)	Violet Meme -Murasaki no Jyouhoudentatsu Chi- (2004)	Indigo Algorithm -Ai no Denshi Kisuuhou- (2004)

Violet Meme -Murasaki no Jyouhoudentatsu Chi- (Violet Meme －紫の情報伝達値－), also known as Quantum Mechanics Rainbow I: Violet Meme, is the sixth (fifth of entirely new music) solo album by artist Daisuke Asakura. It is the first in a series of seven albums released by Asakura in 2004, called Quantum Mechanics Rainbow. Each album revolves around a different color of the rainbow and a different term relating to Quantum Mechanics. This album revolves around the color violet.

== Track listing ==
#	Title	Length	Lyrics
1	"appearance"	3:39
2	"Quantum Mechanics Rainbow I"	3:30
3	"Purple Dawn"	7:55	Makoto Asakura
4	"Meme crack - HARUKA KANATA no Major e " (Meme crack -ハルカ カナタのMajorへ)	5:53	Makoto Asakura
5	"etude on C-String"	1:48
6	"an experiment with you? 2.27.00:28 AM"	1:32
7	"Mona Lisa Overdrive"	5:56
8	"mercy-snow -Violet Rays ver.-"	4:01	Makoto Asakura
9	"disappearance"	3:34

- All songs produced, composed and arranged by Daisuke Asakura
