= Michihiro Kuroda =

Michihiro Kuroda 黒田 倫弘
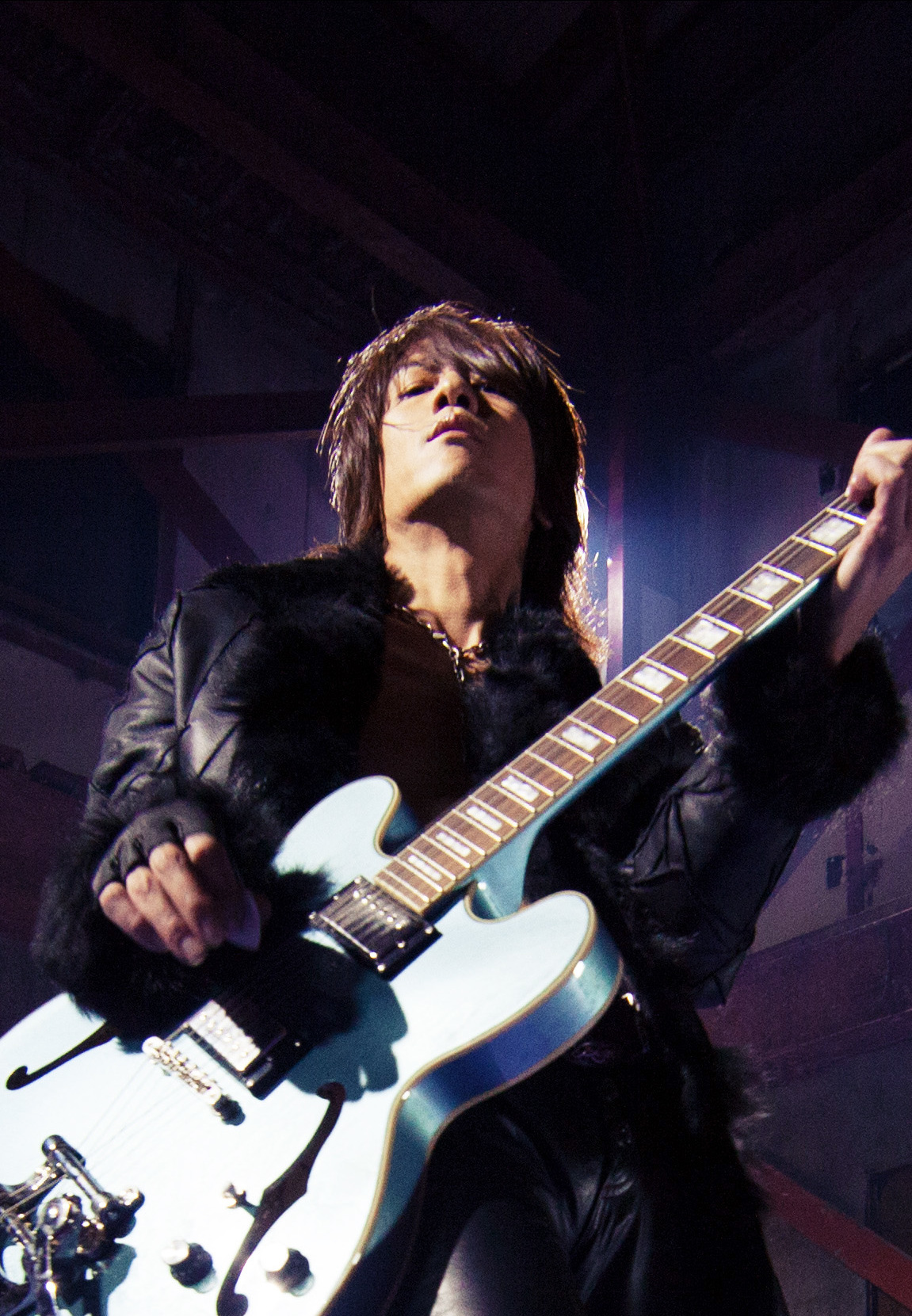

Background information
- Also known as: Rin
- Born: June 6, 1972 (age 54)
- Origin: Japan
- Genres: Rock, Techno, J-pop
- Occupations: Musician, writer
- Instrument: vocals
- Years active: 1995–present
- Website: 66mk

Michihiro Kuroda (黒田 倫弘, Kuroda Michihiro), or Rin (born June 6, 1972) to his fans, was the lead vocalist in the Japanese group Iceman. The group lasted from about 1996–1999. Since then Michihiro has pursued a solo career. Michihiro has released 10 CDs and videos, along with 6 books. In 2006 he teamed up with Iceman guitarist Kenichi Ito once again for a more rock oriented group known as Scarecrow. The group has released a single, titled "Steal your misery". 2006–2009 Scarecrow has released 2 albums and 4 singles and 2 live videos.

Michihiro Kuroda continues his career as a rock vocalist well known for his high live performance quality, releasing album and music videos every year.

From 2000 to 2013, he released 10 albums. He released live videos from every national album live tours.

During this decade he collaborated with musicians such as Tokiko Kato, Naoto Kine (TM Network), Haruichi Shindo (Porno Graffitti).

After 2011 Tōhoku earthquake and tsunami, he joined volunteering activity "Stand Up Japan" held by Takanori Nishikawa.

== Profile ==
Yakusoku is probably most well known for singing "Shining Collection" from the Gravitation anime or for the ending song "Yakusoku" from Elemental Gelade, and singing "Futatsu no Mirai" from Rockman EXE.

Some of his other songs include: CANDY DAYS, Gentenkaiki no Shooting Star, Psychedelic Sneakers, Ready Go, Spiral Century, Save Our Soul, Bulldog66, Samurai Do It, Decadence, Crying Butterfly, Two Futures, Suna no Shiro, and Dusk Tactics.

The song Yakusoku appeared on his 5th album, In Depth, along with the brother track from the same single, "Break the Status Quo".

In early September 2006 it was announced that Rin will be the vocalist in new group Scarecrow, he will be reuniting with former Iceman member Kenichi Itō (Guitar), along with two other members Masnori Ishibashi (Bass) and Hideki Mizue (Drums). Scarecrow had performed live on summer in 2011, and had stopped its activity since then.

== Albums ==
- 1st album "Barefoot"(2001)
- 2nd album "Enrai-out of the garden"(2002)
- 3rd album "Future In Blue"(2003)
- 4th album "SEED"(2004)
- 5th album "IN DEPTH"(2005)
- 6th album "unchanged"(2006)
- 7th album "Frontier"(2008)
- 8th album "ALWAYS"(2010)
- 9th album "VANILLA SKY"(2011)
- 10th album "Grumpy Diamonds"(2012)
- 11th album "Wonder Drive"(2013)
- 12th album "Starting Over" (2015)
- 13th album "WEAVER STANCE" (2017)
