= Indigo Algorithm (Ai no Denshi Kisuuhou) =

Indigo Algorithm -Ai no Denshi Kisuuhou-

Studio album by Daisuke Asakura
- Released: May 25, 2004
- Genre: Pop, Synthpop, Techno, Electronica, Dance
- Length: 55:00
- Label: Darwin Records
- Producer: Daisuke Asakura

Daisuke Asakura chronology
Violet Meme -Murasaki no Jyouhoudentatsu Chi- (2004)	Indigo Algorithm -Ai no Denshi Kisuuhou- (2004)	Blue Resolution -Ao no Shikaku Kaiseki do - (2004)

Indigo Algorithm -Ai no Denshi Kisuuhou- (Indigo Algorithm－藍の電思基数法－), also known as Quantum Mechanics Rainbow II: Indigo Algorithm, is the seventh (sixth of entirely new music) solo album by artist Daisuke Asakura. It is the second in a series of seven albums released by Asakura in 2004, called Quantum Mechanics Rainbow. Each album revolves around a different color of the rainbow and a different term relating to Quantum Mechanics. This album revolves around the color indigo. The album also contains a re-arrangement of a song originally performed by another, now defunct, band that Daisuke Asakura had produced in the past, The Seeker. It also contains guest vocals by Takatoshi Shindo (Track 5).

== Track listing ==
#	Title	Length	Lyrics
1	"Abyssos -shi.n.ka.i-"	2:56
2	"Angel Algorithm"	6:05	Makoto Asakura
3	"etude on D-String"	2:44
4	"Division by Zero error"	9:53
5	"Sheltering Sea"	6:55	Akio Inoue
6	"Indigo Cave"	12:08	Makoto Asakura
7	"Quantum Mechanics Rainbow II"	3:34
8	"Stigma -indigo-saurus! ver.-"	9:19	Akio Inoue
9	"Ouranos -te.n.ku.u-"	3:34

- All songs produced, composed and arranged by Daisuke Asakura
