= 21st Fortune =

Studio album by Daisuke Asakura
- Released: September 19, 2002
- Genres: Pop, synth-pop, dance, techno, electronica
- Length: 68:00
- Label: Antinos Records
- Producer: Daisuke Asakura

Daisuke Asakura chronology
DecAde ~The BEST of Daisuke Asakura~ (2001)	21st Fortune (2002)	CLUB MIX Album: Sequence Virus 2003 (2003)

21st Fortune is the fourth (third of entirely new music) solo album released by Daisuke Asakura on September 19, 2002.

== Track listing ==
- All songs produced by Daisuke Asakura
- All vocals & lyrics by Daisuke Asakura

No.	Title	Length
1.	"winter mute"	5:16
2.	"call name future"	5:40
3.	"ride on free"	5:07
4.	"Techno Beethoven"	3:46
5.	"Spring Phase"	7:52
6.	"robots ~bluntsoundz mix"	7:06
7.	"Theme of J-Sports"	1:54
8.	"Fairy Make a Lie?"	5:53
9.	"Summer Fade"	6:19
10.	"Autumn Trance"	4:24
11.	"Autumn Choir"	6:50
12.	"November Nocturne"	2:39
13.	"beautiful symphony ~only for your life~"	5:32
