= Rich McNanna =

American actor (born 1977)

Rich McNanna (born 1977 in Newark, New Jersey) is an American actor. He attended Seton Hall University in South Orange, New Jersey from 1995 to 2000. McNanna is best known for his work in several anime productions, most notably portraying Shuichi Shindo in the Gravitation series, Hiroyuki Fujita in the To Heart series, Jack Walker in the feature Pokémon Ranger and the Temple of the Sea, and Tonio in Pokémon: The Rise of Darkrai. He has also appeared several times in non-recurring roles in the Pokémon television series on Cartoon Network, and is a regular on several series for Everest Productions on the Turkish American Ebru Television. McNanna is an eighth grade English teacher in Westfield, New Jersey.
