= Hiroyuki Takami =

Japanese singer and actor (born 1969)

- Born: Hiroyuki Fukuda (福田博幸); 3 June 1969 (age 57); Saitama, Japan
- Other name: Hiro Fukuda (福田ヒロ)
- Occupations: Singer, actor
- Years active: 1987–present
- Agent: Guan Barl
- Website: https://www.guanbarl.jp/LINKS/takami/

Hiroyuki Takami (貴水博之 Takami Hiroyuki, born 3 June 1969 Saitama, Japan, birthname Fukuda Hiroyuki 福田博幸) is a Japanese singer and actor. He is a member of the Japanese pop group access or AXS.

Hiroyuki Takami (nickname Hiro) was born under the name 福田博幸. Later using the stage name "Hiroyuki Takami". His first single "Grievous Rain" was the ending theme for the anime "Getter Robo Go". His first group was Hot Sox, then he used the stage name Hiro Fukuda (福田ヒロ). He recorded songs for newly solo composer/synthist Daisuke Asakura and in 1992 they formed the group access (aka AXS). He remained in access until 1994 when the group split up. He continued his solo career and started in musicals and movies including Wangan Midnight Return, Little Shop of Horrors, Boy's Time, Goodbye Charlie, Legend of the Galactic Heroes, Monty Python's Spamalot. In 2002 he reunited with Daisuke Asakura in access while still continuing with his work in musicals and plays. He played the role of Masamune Dan/Kamen Rider Cronus in Kamen Rider Ex-Aid, which aired in 2017.

== Discography ==
=== Singles ===
- Grievous Rain (5 March 1991)
- I&I (1 September 1995)
- me wo samase (25 October 1995)
- oshiete (5 December 1995)
- Labyrinth (11 March 1996)
- ? (question) (21 September 1996)
- Naked (21 August 1997)
- Gold Vibration (20 November 1997)
- ride on love. (17 February 1999)
- Believe, (26 May 1999)
- Super Goddess (5 September 2001)
- Silent Moon (26 May 2004)
- Eternal Sky (26 October 2011)
- Let it Bounce (26 January 2023)
- Heavenly Soar (1 September 2023)

=== Albums ===
- Saturation Flower (21 August 1991)
- Sun (20 December 1995)
- Labyrinth (25 April 1996)
- Wall (23 October 1996)
- Grow (17 December 1997)
- Hiro the Best (24 June 1998)
- Best Destination (29 September 2010)
- Gimmick Zone (22 August 2018)
- Wild Tamashii (28 August 2019)

=== VHS ===
- Get the Sun ~Cuban Touch (18 January 1996)
- Walls ~British Sight~ (7 November 1997)

=== DVD ===
- Best Clips (29 June 2005)
- HIROYUKI TAKAMI TOUR 2019 Love&Victory -Wild Tamashii- rough edit style (April 2022)

== See also ==
- access
- Daisuke Asakura
