= Maki Murakami =

Japanese manga artist

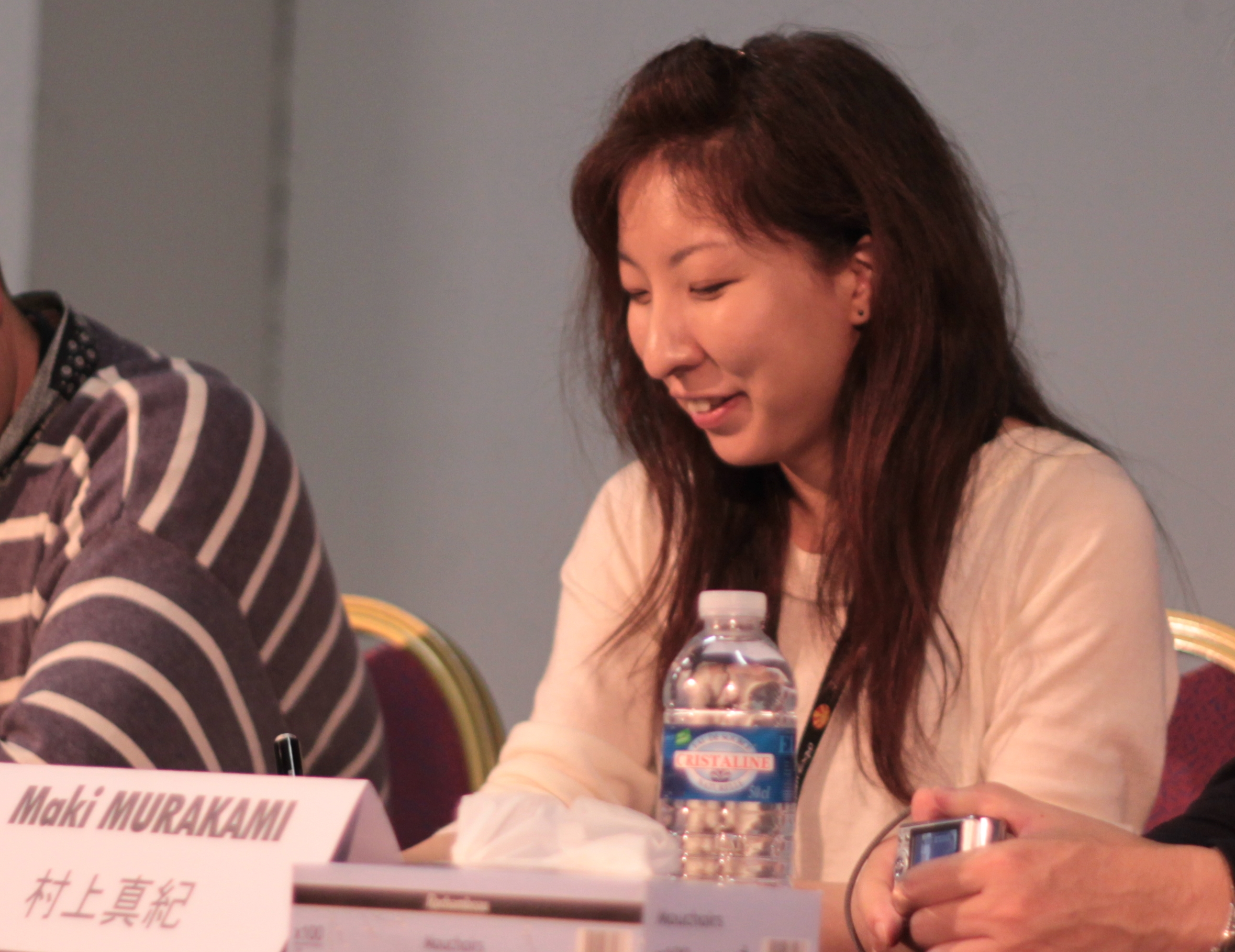
- Maki Murakami, Chibi Japan Expo 2010
- Born: 24 May; Otaru, Hokkaidō
- Occupation: Manga artist
- Known for: Gravitation

Maki Murakami (村上真紀, Murakami Maki) is a Japanese manga artist, most famous for the boys love manga Gravitation, which, in addition to the Gravitation novel, is published in the U.S. by Tokyopop.

== Biography ==
=== History ===
She began working as an assistant to the older sister of one of her friends, drawing hentai manga, while she was still in high school, and produced many dojinshi about musicians.

Maki Murakami has continued the Gravitation series with Gravitation EX, which has also been licensed by Tokyopop. Gravitation EX only consists of 1 volume in English and the second one is currently being published by Gentosha comics in Japanese.

Her work Gamerz Heaven was licensed by ADV Films in North America with the first two volumes, but the third and fourth are not yet translated.

She is also the creator of Kanpai! which was published by Tokyopop, but only has two volumes and it is unknown if it will eventually be continued by her.

She is one of many manga artists who draws her own dōjinshi including Gravitation Remix 1-12, Gravitation Megamix EST, Gravitation Megamix Panda, Gravitation Megamix Kumagoro, Gravitation Megamix Capybara, Kanpai! DJ: Unapai, Gamerz Heaven DJ: Director's Cut.

On December 31, 2020, Maki Murakami released a BL hentai dōjinshi manga on the Japanese dōjinshi site DLsite for the first time, under the penname "sin". She since has released multiple works there, including Gravitation dōjinshi The Novelist is in a Good Mood Today, other works such as Round Two with my Student, and multiple work series The Hitman's Failure and The Scary Older Guys are Nice.

== Works ==
- Gravitation (1996–2002, Gentosha)
- Kanpai! (2001, Gentosha)
- Gamerz Heaven (2003–2005, serialized in Comic Blade, Mag Garden)
- Gravitation Ex (2007–ongoing, Gentosha)
- Kimi no Unaji ni Kanpai! (2007)
