= Access (group) =

Band from Japan

- Also known as: AXS
- Origin: Japan
- Genres: Electropop; synthpop; synthrock
- Years active: 1992–1995; 2002–present
- Labels: Funhouse (1992–1995); Antinos (2002–2003); Sony Music Associated Records (2006–2010); Darwin Records (2010–2017); Sony Music Associated Records (2017–); Lantis (2024)
- Members: Daisuke Asakura; Hiroyuki Takami
- Website: www.access-web.jp

Access (also known as AXS) is a Japanese pop group. Its members are Daisuke Asakura and Hiroyuki Takami. Asakura is the primary composer/producer and featured keyboardist while Takami is the vocalist. Takami also writes a major portion of access' lyrics. Access is currently signed with Sony Music Associated Records. The name "access" is stylized in lowercase letters.

== History ==
Access was formed after Hiroyuki Takami performed in some of Daisuke Asakura's solo work as a guest vocalist in 1991. The unit's career officially began in 1992. The duo went on to record three albums and attain significant popularity before announcing their breakup in 1995 for ambiguous reasons. In 2002, however, they reunited with much fanfare, and have remained active since.

"AXS" is their written nickname. While spelled "AXS", it is actually not an "X" but two inwardly-turned arrows ("A-><-S"). The nickname was coined by Takami. It first appeared on the group's debut album, Fast Access, on the last page of the lyrics book. "AXS" replaced the group's name on their third single "Naked Desire." The logo has many variations depending on its use. There is only one album that has "AXS" credited as the group's name: AXS Remix Best Tracks. In all of their albums from 1993 to 1995 song production was credited as "songs by AXS". Before their reunion in 2002, the logo and nickname have not been used, except as credits for remixed songs on the album and tour DVDs of "Crossbridge". In 2006, for the "blanc and rouge" tour, "AXS" reappeared in the tour logo interwoven in the design of a coat of arms.

In 2007, after the Virginia Tech massacre, access produced the song "Shadow over the world" in dedication to the memory of the victims. The song was released on the album "binary engine" and had its live debut during their summer tour of that same year.

Access performed the opening theme for Code Geass: Lelouch of the Rebellion Stages 24 & 25, "Hitomi no Tsubasa", and did the third opening theme for D.Gray-Man, "Doubt & Trust" (2007). In July 2008, their single "Dream Runner" was featured as the opening theme of the TV drama series, Here is Greenwood. In 2009, Access was indirectly featured in a musical rendition of Goodbye Charlie with Takami portraying one of the lead roles and Asakura having composed and directed the music. Their single "Bet～追憶のRoulette～" was featured as an ending theme for Fuji TV's series Sukimono from 30 July 2012 to 27 August 2012. Access was also featured in Fuji TV's event live, "FNSうたの夏まつり" ("FNS Summer Festival of Song" - 8 August 2012) doing a cover of TM Network's song, "Be Together", with Tetsuya Komuro.

== Discography ==
=== Singles ===
[26 November 1992] Virgin Emotion

1. Virgin Emotion
2. Be Nude

[25 January 1993] Jewelry Angel

1. Jewelry Angel
2. Against The Rules
3. Virgin Emotion(Instrumental Mix)

[26 May 1993] Naked Desire

1. Naked Desire
2. Every Time You
3. Jewelry Angel (Instrumental Mix)

[25 August 1993] Moonshine Dance

1. Moonshine Dance
2. Lyin' Eyes
3. Naked Desire (Instrumental Mix)

[8 December 1993] Try Again

1. Try Again
2. Jungling Party
3. Moonshine Dance (Instrumental Mix)

[26 January 1994] 夢を見たいから (Yume Wo Mitaikara)

1. 夢を見たいから
2. Us
3. Try Again (Instrumental Mix)

[27 April 1994] Misty Heartbreak

1. Misty Heartbreak
2. Stoned Merge
3. 夢を見たいから (Instrumental Mix)

[25 May 1994] Sweet Silence

1. Sweet Silence
2. Decade & XXX

[19 August 1994] Drastic Mermaid

1. Drastic Mermaid
2. Sequence Meditation～超電導思考回路 第一楽章 覚醒
3. Sweet Silence (Instrumental Mix)

[25 August 1994] Drastic Mermaid Re-sync Style
[19 October 1994] Scandalous Blue

1. Scandalous Blue
2. Sequence Meditation～超電導思考回路 第二楽章 混乱
3. Drastic Mermaid (Instrumental Mix)

[26 October 1994] Scandalous Blue Re-sync Style
[7 December 1994] Tear's Liberation

1. Tear's Liberation
2. Sequence Meditation～超電導思考回路 第三楽章 解放
3. Scandalous Blue (Instrumental Mix)

[14 December 1994] Tear's Liberation Re-sync Style
[23 January 2002] Only the love survive

1. Only the love survive
2. Look-a-Head <from Live before next at Yokohama Arena 19 December 1994>

[27 February 2002] Edge

1. Edge
2. Especially Kiss

[19 February 2003] Real at Night ～眠れぬ夜の向こうに～ (Real at Night ~Nemurenu Yoru No Muko Ni~)

1. Real at Night ～眠れぬ夜の向こうに～

[31 January 2007] Diamond Cycle

1. Stay
2. Bright Sight
3. Inner Cycle
4. Catch the Rainbow

[18 July 2007] 瞳ノ翼 (Hitomi No Tsubasa)

1. 瞳ノ翼
2. 瞳ノ翼（TV size version）
3. 瞳ノ翼（Instrumental）

[31 October 2007] Doubt & Trust ～ダウト&トラスト～

1. Doubt & Trust ～ダウト&トラスト～
2. Gonna Be
3. Doubt & Trust ～ダウト&トラスト～ （Instrumental）

[27 August 2008] Dream Runner

1. Dream Runner
2. Paradise
3. Dream Runner (TV version)
4. Dream Runner (Instrumental)

[28 July 2010] Higher Than Dark Sky
Version A

1. Higher Than Dark Sky
2. アオイナミ (Aoi Nami)
3. SOUL DYNAMITE

Version B

1. Higher Than Dark Sky
2. SOUL DYNAMITE (original live)
3. アオイナミ (original live)

[3 August 2011] Share The Love
Version A

1. Share The Love
2. KEEP IT
3. Ride Up for the Shiny Way

Version B

1. Share The Love
2. KEEP IT (2010 Version)
3. Higher Than Dark Sky (Piano Version)

[4 April 2012] Wild Butterfly

1. Wild Butterfly
2. Beyond the Second-D.
3. ChaOs GrAdatioN

[11 July 2012] Bet～追憶のRoulette～

1. Bet～追憶のRoulette～
2. Let Me Go
3. Bet～追憶のRoulette～ (Instrumental)

[8 May 2013] 永遠dive
[17 July 2013] JOY TRAIN
[9 July 2014] Vertical Innocence
[8 April 2015] IZASUSUME!
[21 October 2015] Winter Ring Affair
[23 November 2016] 24sync
[24 May 2017] Knock beautiful smile
[21 July 2024] arc jump'n to the sky

=== Albums ===
[25 April 1993] Fast Access

1. Sensual Glide
2. Virgin Emotion (1st single)
3. Pale Blue Rain
4. Jewelry Angel (Deep AXS Mix) (2nd single)
5. Distance~Motomeauniwa Tosugite~
6. Hot Cruising Night (Original AXS)
7. Against the Rules
8. Can-Dee Graffiti
9. Be Nude
10. Perfect Timing
11. Look-A-Head

[22 September 1993] ACCESS II

1. NIGHT WAVE (ORIGINAL AXS VERSION)
2. NAKED DESIRE (THE ENTERPRISE MIX) (3rd single)
3. MOONSHINE DANCE (THE ENTERPRISE MIX) (4th single)
4. I SING EVERY SHINE FOR YOU
5. JUNGLING PARTY
6. LYIN' EYES (THE ENTERPRISE MIX)
7. REALTIME LOVER
8. ENDLESS SUMMER 〜君が滲んだ夏 (Kimi ga Nijinda Natsu)〜
9. MARMALADE DAYS
10. JULIET
11. S-MILE GENERATION

[25 May 1994] DELICATE PLANET

1. Silver Heart
2. Misty Heartbreak -West Side Mix- (7th single)
3. Yume wo mitai kara -West Side Mix- (6th single)
4. Stay My Love
5. Stoned Merge -West Side Mix-
6. Pink Junktion
7. Regret
8. Decade & XXX
9. Sweet Silence -West Side Mix- (8th single)
10. Try Again -West Side Mix- (5th single)
11. Find New Way
12. Beat Planet

[15 March 1995] Live Ones Sync - Across Japan Tour '93-'94
[15 March 1995] Live Zeros Sync - Across Japan Tour '93-'94
[1 October 1995] AXS Single Tracks
[25 March 1996] AXS REMIX BEST TRACKS (Remix Album)
[23 June 1999] Sync - Beat Box -893 Days-
[20 March 2002] CROSSBRIDGE

1. "born a cross"(instruments)
2. Shake the Sunrise
3. Only the love survive ～PK mix～ (12th single)
4. Jewelry Angel 2002 ～Platonic Eye～
5. Moonshine Dance 2002 ～Return to Star～
6. 夢を見たいから (Yume o Mitai kara) 2002 ～Soul The Future Love～
7. 777 trois seven
8. Against the Rules 2002 ～AA trance～
9. Grand Muse
10. EDGE ～PK mix～ (13th single)
11. "cross a bridge"(instruments)

[5 February 2003] Rippin' Ghost

1. -a-bstract Ghost
2. Kiss My -a- Soul
3. Break Through The Big Town
4. White Lights
5. Real at Night ～眠れぬ夜の向こうに (Nemurenu Yoru no Muko ni)～
6. Fly High, Fly Away ～In-Comer Android～
7. balearic Ghost
8. View
9. Ozone, In the Native
10. Another Day
11. Hung Me for the Distance ～絆された愛の果てに (Hodasareta Ai no Hate ni)～

[9 April 2003] Re-sync Ghost (Remix Album)

1. Real at Night (truancy mix)
2. Real at Night (knockin'barrier mix)
3. White Lights (lovely'snowy'mix)
4. White Lights (deep valentine mix)
5. Hung Me for the Distance (pascal talk mix)
6. Hung Me for the Distance (preservative mix)
7. Fly High, Fly Away In-Comer Android (extended dub mix)
8. Ozone, In the Native (extended dub mix)

[31 January 2007] diamond cycle

1. Stay
2. Bright Sight
3. Inner Cycle
4. Catch the Rainbow

[4 July 2007] binary engine

1. Awake
2. closet
3. Life goes on
4. Wild in the desert
5. Summer Night Breezer
6. biologic engine（Instrumental）
7. Gone too Soon
8. Shadow over the world
9. High and Scream
10. 瞳ノ翼 (Hitomi no Tsubasa) ～binary version

[21 November 2007] access best selection
Disc 1

1. Virgin Emotion
2. Jewelry Angel
3. Naked Desire
4. Moonshine Dance
5. Try Again
6. 夢を見たいから
7. Misty Heartbreak
8. Sweet Silence
9. Drastic Mermaid
10. Scandalous Blue
11. Tear's Liberation
12. Only the love survive
13. Edge
14. Real at Night ～眠れぬ夜の向こうに～
15. 瞳ノ翼
16. Doubt & Trust ～ダウト&トラスト～

Disc 2

1. Sequence Meditation ～超電導思考回路 第一楽章 覚醒～
2. Find New Way
3. Be Nude
4. Lyin' Eyes （Crossbridge ver. 2002）
5. Stoned Merge （blanc and rouge ver.2006）
6. Decade & ×××（Summer Style ver.2002）
7. Beat Planet （binary engine ver.2007）
8. Shake the Sunrise
9. Against the Rules 2002 ～AA trance～
10. Hung Me for the Distance ～絆された愛の果てに～
11. balearic Ghost
12. Stay
13. Life goes on
14. Stay My Love

Disc 3

1. Summer Night Breezer
2. closet
3. Especially Kiss
4. White Lights
5. Pale Blue Rain
6. Jungling party
7. Night Wave
8. Against the Rules
9. Silver Heart （binary engine version 2007）
10. Catch the Rainbow
11. View
12. Ozone in the Native
13. Grand Muse
14. Look-A-Head

[22 August 2012] Secret Cluster

All Versions (Disc 1)

1. vibe cluster (Instrumental）
2. Bet ~追憶のRoulette (Tsuioku no Roulette)~ Album ver.
3. Beyond the Second-D.
4. Star Tribal
5. Let me go
6. Stand By
7. ChaOs GrAdatioN
8. f☆R☆E☆e
9. Wild Butterfly Album ver.
10. Secret Dimension (Instrumental）
11. 20th Sincerely

Version A, Disc 2: 2007–2011 Singles Collection

1. Doubt & Trust ～ダウト&トラスト～
2. GONNA BE
3. Dream Runner
4. PARADISE
5. Higher Than Dark Sky
6. アオイナミ (Aoi Nami)
7. SOUL DYNAMITE
8. Share The Love
9. Keep It
10. Ride Up for the Shiny Way

Version B, Disc 2: DVD - access COUNTDOWN LIVE 2011-2012 LIVE DIGEST

[5 December 2012] Re-Sync Cluster (Remix Album)

1. Wild Butterfly Digital Ageha Re-Sync Style (remixed by Daisuke Asakura)
2. Beyond the Second-D. S'capade Remix (remixed by Shinnosuke - SOUL'd OUT)
3. Stand By Deep Air Re-Sync Style (remixed by Daisuke Asakura)
4. Wild Butterfly Digital Spider Remix (Remixed by YOW-ROW/GARI)
5. ChaOs GrAdatioN External Re-Sync (Remixed by Kensuke Ushio/agraph)
6. Bet ~追憶のRoulette~ Demon Angel Re-Sync Style (Remixed by Daisuke Asakura)

[20 December 2017] Heart Mining

1. Cassini (Instrumental)
2. Crack Boy
3. Vertical Innocence (Heart Mining Ver.)
4. Inside me, Inside you
5. Tragedy
6. Discover Borderless
7. Knock beautiful smile (Heart Mining Ver.)
8. Friend Mining
9. Heart Mining
10. Voyager (Instrumental)
11. 永遠dive (Eien dive) (Heart Mining Ver.)

=== DVD ===
- [20 March 1993] Fast Access Looking 4 Reflexions
- [18 October 1993] SECOND Access Looking 4 ReflexionsII
- [9 February 1994] Live Reflexions Access To Second
- [2 June 1994] Looking 4 Reflexions III Delicate Planet
- [19 December 1994] Looking 4 Reflexions IV Sequence Meditation
- [1 March 1995] Live Reflexions II Sync-Across Japan Tour '94 Delicate Planet Arena Style
- [21 August 2002] Access Tour 2002 "Crossbridge" Live at Tokyo International Forum
- [19 March 2003] Access Live Sync - Across 2002 "Summer Style" Live at Nippon Budokan
- [26 March 2008] access 15TH Anniversary DVD Box

== Live performances ==
- [20 March 1993 ~ 16 April 1993] 1993 Fast access Tour '93
- [18 October 1993 ~ 28 December 1993] 1993 Sync-Across Japan Tour '93 Access to Second
- [2 June 1994 ~ 2 September 1994] 1994 Sync-Across Japan Tour '94 Delicate Planet
- [12 December 1994 ~ 19 December 1994] 1994 Sync-Across Japan Tour '94 Delicate Planet Arena Style
- [23 April 2002 ~ 26 May 2002] access Tour 2002 Crossbridge
- [27 August 2002 ~ 28 August 2002] access Tour 2002 "Summer Style"
- [4 April 2003 ~ 1 June 2003] access Tour 2003 -Livin' Ghost
- [1 July 2005 ~ 10 July 2005] access Tour 2005 Catch The Summer
- [30 July 2005 ~ 20 August 2005] access Joint 2005 -Film, Talk and Live Event-
- [5 April 2006 ~ 21 April 2006] access Tour 2006 "blanc" and "rouge"
- [7 February 2007 ~ 7 March 2007] access Tour 2007 diamond cycle
- [29 July 2007 ~ 25 August 2007] access Tour 2007 -binary engine- ~Zepp Version~
- [6 July 2007 ~ 10 September 2007] access Tour 2007 -binary engine- ~Hall version~
- [12 July 2008 ~ 4 August 2008] access Tour 2008 -We are access-
- [25 July 2009 ~ 14 August 2009] access Tour 2009 SUMMER STYLE
- [31 July 2010 ~ 29 August 2010] access Tour 2010 STREAM
- [8 August ~ 28 August 2011] access Tour 2011 OPERATION CONNECT
- [11 March ~ 4 April 2012] access 20th Anniversary CLUB TOUR 2012 minimum CLUSTER
- [14 July ~ 24 August 2012] access 20th Anniversary TOUR 2012 MEGA cluster
