= Gravitation (manga) =

Japanese manga series and anime

- Cover of the first volume of Gravitation as published by Gentosha

グラビテーション (Gurabitēshon)
- Genre: Boys' love, comedy
- Manga
- Written by: Maki Murakami
- Published by: Gentosha
- English publisher: AUS: Madman Entertainment; NA: Tokyopop (former); Seven Seas Entertainment (current)
- Magazine: Kimi to Boku
- Original run: 1996 – 2002
- Volumes: 12
- Original video animation
- Produced by: Koichi Kikuchi; Koji Yoritsune; Masahiro Chiku; Yumiko Masujima
- Written by: Hiroyuki Kawasaki
- Music by: Daisuke Asakura
- Studio: Plum
- Licensed by: Crunchyroll: SEA: Medialink; UK: MVM Films
- Released: July 23, 1999 – September 22, 1999
- Runtime: 30 minutes per episode
- Episodes: 2
- Anime television series
- Directed by: Bob Shirohata
- Produced by: Masahiro Chiku; Yumiko Masujima
- Written by: Akemi Omode; Mamiko Ikeda; Michiko Yokote
- Music by: Daisuke Asakura; Tomoko Shibuya; Daisuke Jinbo
- Studio: Studio Deen
- Licensed by: Crunchyroll: SEA: Medialink; UK: MVM Films
- Original network: WOWOW
- English network: US: Anime Network, ImaginAsian, Anime Selects
- Original run: October 4, 2000 – January 10, 2001
- Episodes: 13
- Manga

Gravitation EX.
- Written by: Maki Murakami
- Published by: Gentosha
- English publisher: AUS: Madman Entertainment; NA: Seven Seas Entertainment
- Magazine: Genzo (2004–2009); Web Spica (2011)
- Original run: December 2004 – November 2011
- Volumes: 2

Gravitation (Japanese: グラビテーション, Hepburn: Gurabitēshon) is a Japanese manga series written and illustrated by Maki Murakami. The story follows the attempts of Shuichi Shindo and his band, Bad Luck, to become Japan's next musical sensation, and his struggles to capture Eiri Yuki's heart.

The manga was published by Gentosha and was serialized on Kimi to Boku starting in 1996 and ending in 2002. The manga has been licensed and published in English by Tokyopop, as well as a light novel. There is also the Gravitation Collection which consists of 6 volumes, each of which has two original volumes of Gravitation in it. A sequel, Gravitation EX. (グラビテーションＥＸ．, Gurabitēshon EX.), was published in the web magazine Genzo from 2004 to 2009 and returned in 2011 to Web Spica.

Gravitation has also been adapted into a two episode OVA series in 1999 and a thirteen-episode anime television series directed by Bob Shirohata. The TV series aired in Japan from October 4, 2000, to January 10, 2001, on WOWOW Wednesdays at 18:30 and was reaired on Tokyo MX in 2007. The anime goes to roughly volume seven of the manga. Both have been licensed for North American release by Nozomi Entertainment and also Southeast Asian release by Medialink.

== Plot ==
The story surrounds an aspiring singer, Shuichi Shindou, and his band, Bad Luck (formed with his best friend Hiroshi Nakano, who is on guitar). Shuichi wants to become Japan's next big star, and follow in the footsteps of the famous idol Ryuichi Sakuma, lead singer of the now-disbanded legendary group Nittle Grasper. One evening, Shuichi is looking over lyrics for a song he is writing when his paper is blown away by the wind and picked up by a tall, blond-haired (light brown in the manga) stranger. The man dismisses Shuichi's hard work as garbage, which hurts Shuichi deeply. Despite his anger, he is intrigued by the stranger. This will be their first encounter as Shuichi becomes fascinated by the stranger, who soon turns out to be the famous romance novelist Eiri Yuki (real name: Uesugi). Both the manga and the anime follow this plot.

=== Gravitation EX. ===
The story picks up directly after volume 12; Shuichi and Eiri find and agree to momentarily take care of Yuki Kitazawa's son, Riku. Shuichi kisses and conducts a short affair with Ryuichi Sakuma, who announces that he has always been in love with Shuichi. Eiri is in a car accident that causes him to temporarily lose his eyesight, and Reiji announces that she's making a movie about everything that has happened to them. Shuichi believes that this movie is the reason Ryuichi "pretended" to go after him, although Ryuichi's true motives remain unknown.

== Development ==
The precursor to the Gravitation manga was a dōjinshi series titled Help!, which followed a similar storyline but cast the characters in slightly different roles.

Murakami went to New York to research for a storyline later in Gravitation where the characters visit the city.

Murakami has created dōjinshi based on Gravitation which she describes as "pretty hard-core, adult stuff. Remix is softcore and Megamix is much more hardcore". She created the dōjinshi to explore tensions between the characters. Murakami penned a thirteen-volume dōjinshi series called Gravitation Remix under the group Crocodile Ave. The dōjinshi are much more sexually explicit than the anime and deviate heavily from the manga storyline. Fans have requested that Tokyopop license Gravitation Remix, but Tokyopop regards the depiction of some characters to be too young and is concerned about themes of incest, and therefore has not licensed them.

In addition to the remixes, Murakami created four highly sexually explicit "Megamix" dōjinshi, dubbed Mega-gra, Megamix: Panda, Megamix: Kumagorou, and Megamix: Capybara. These also deviate from the storyline as the Remixes do, with Panda including shota content. A new Megamix is currently in the works, entitled Megamix Zebra. Megamix Zebra will feature Shuichi, Ryuichi, and Eiri in a threesome, with Shuichi as the seme.

== Media ==
=== Manga ===
Written and illustrated by Maki Murakami, the manga was serialized in Gentosha's Kimi to Boku magazine between 1996 and 2002. Initially, a total of eleven tankōbon volumes were released by Sony Magazines between March 7, 1996, and December 25, 2000. Gentosha started to republish the series on April 24, 2002, concluding with the twelfth on August 24, 2002. A "Special Edition" (スペシャル版, Supesharu-ban) was released by Gentosha between April 25 and September 22, 2006.

Tokyopop licensed the series for an English-language release in North America and published the twelve volumes from August 5, 2003 to July 12, 2005. Tokyopop also released the series in six compilation volumes in 2009–10. Madman Entertainment distributes the series in New Zealand and Australia. Seven Seas Entertainment licensed the series in October 2023 and released omnibus volumes of the series.

A sequel to the series, Gravitation EX., started to be serialized in Japanese and English in the online magazine Web Comic Genzo. The first volume was published simultaneously by Gentosha and Tokyopop on February 24, 2007. Madman Entertainment also distributed the series in New Zealand and Australia. In the March 2009 issue, Murakami put the series on hiatus; Murakami resumed the series on June 28, 2011, in Gentosha's online magazine Web Spica. The second volume was published on November 24, 2011.

On May 28, 2014, Murakami published a one-shot based on Gravitation, titled Shindo Family Circumstances (新堂家の事情, Shindō-ke no Jijō), which was followed by a series of the same name on July 28 in Web Spica.

=== Anime ===
==== OVA ====
A two-part OVA adaptation was created by Plum, Animate Film, SPE Visual Works, Sony Magazines, and Movic. The first episode was released on July 23, 1999, and the second was released on September 22, 1999. It used the opening theme "Blind Game Again" and the ending theme "Smashing Blue" with the lyrics, composition, and arrangement done by Mad Soldiers and sung By Kinya Kotani. There are three insert songs, Part 1 had one called "Spicy Marmalade", with the lyrics, composition, and arrangement done by Mad Soldiers and sung by Kinya Kotani. Part 2 had two, the first one "In the Moonlight" with the lyrics, composition, and arrangement done by Mad Soldiers and sung By Kinya Kotani and the second "Shining Collection" with the lyrics, composition, and arrangement and sung by Iceman. The series was released in North America on DVD by Nozomi Entertainment in 2005 under the name Gravitation: Lyrics of Love.

==== TV series ====
An anime television series adaptation was produced by Studio Deen, SME Visual Works, and Sony Magazines and directed by Bob Shirohata. The opening and closing themes to the TV series are "Super Drive'" and "Glaring Dream", performed respectively by Yosuke Sakanoue and Kinya Kotani. The series was released in North America on DVD by Nozomi Entertainment in 2004.

No.	Title	Original release date
1	"Gravitation"	October 4, 2000
During an interview with the group ASK, we discover Shuichi and Hiroshi being given an earful by their manager Sakano as Shuichi has not finished writing the love song. In the evening, while walking in a park, the paper on which the song is written escapes Shuichi's hands and landed in the hands of a mysterious and handsome stranger who said very hurtful words about it. ("No talent", "abandoned"). The next day is much like the day before, except Shuichi is depressed, and he decides to find the stranger. While walking on the street in the rain, he jumps in front of a car, knowing that the stranger is inside. They go to the stranger's apartment. The next day at work, Hiroshi makes Shuichi realize that he's in love with the stranger. Sakano turns on the TV, which is showing an interview of the stranger – Eiri Yuki, a famous writer. Shuichi urgently goes to Yuki's apartment, where he comes across Yuki being bothered by a woman outside. Yuki pretends Shuichi is his boyfriend to get the woman to leave. After she goes, Shuichi challenges Yuki to come and listen to Shuchi's concert. Yuki says that Shuichi is in love with him. So, Shuichi follows Yuki into the lift, questioning Yuki's comments. As the lift doors close, Yuki kisses Shuichi.
2	"Live in Soul"	October 11, 2000
Yuki's sister Mika is married to the great producer Seguchi Touma, who used to play in the band Nittle Grasper, of which Shuichi is a fan. To succeed, Shuichi's band, Bad Luck, must obtain Touma's support. Yuki's sister proposes a deal to Shuichi – he will convince Yuki to recontact his family, and she will ensure her husband's support for Bad Luck. Shuichi refuses the deal, but decides to convince Yuki to see his family anyway. Yuki suspects his sister's involvement, which annoys him because he thinks Shuichi capitulated. His annoyance can be seen in the concert which becomes a total fiasco. Fortunately, Ryuichi Sakuma, the experienced singer of Nittle Grasper was in the audience, invited by Touma, and helps them. This greatly cheers Shuichi as he is singing with his idol.
3	"Stray Heart"	October 18, 2000
After the performance they had given last night, Mr. Touma decided that there should be another member added to the Band because he felt that there was something strongly lacking in their performance. And Sakano was fired as the Band's manager, but later in the episode he is told that he can become the bands producer. Shuichi can't understand why they aren't good enough and can't accept another member in the band which he and Hiro have been members of for a while, He believes that a new member would mess up what they already have. Hiro and him get in a fight when Hiro believes that a new member would improve them and Shuichi runs away into the park. Ryuichi and K ("Nittle Grasper's" previous manager, he now currently the manager of Ryuichi) find him crying and try to calm him down. Shuichi goes to see Hiro but confronts a little boy on the way that claims to be the new member in Bad Luck. That night Shuichi tells Yuki all his problems and Yuki tells him he's being very foolish and childish and tells him to leave. The next day he finds out that Fujisaki Suguru, the new member in the band ends up being very talented. Shuichi suddenly lost confidence in him, and even worse! The new guy is trying to change his song! This hurts Shuichi's pride and leaves him depressed... at least until Hiro goes and tells Yuki to give Shuichi some confidence. Can Shuichi accept the new member? Can Yuki convince him?
4	"Wave Shock"	October 25, 2000
Shuichi invites himself to stay with Yuki at his home, and Yuki isn't really happy about Shuichi's plans, but sees that Shuichi really wants this so he gives in to him, letting him stay for one week. The next morning Shuichi leaves to practice with his group and says that he'll be back in time for dinner, but at the studio he finds out it won't be possible. K is the Group's new manager and has got them a gig on TV! To their disappointment it is not a music show they are going to participate in but a quiz show. The prize is a million yen, but Shuichi asks them that since they do not need the money if they perform on the show instead. The producers of the show don't mind, and say they can. It turns out that Shuichi isn't really that smart, so Hiro takes over the buzzer. The final question was fixed by Touma to be one that Shuichi will know, One about Yuki. He does this by telling them if they want ratings, then they know what they should do. Shuchi gets the question right and they perform. After the show Shuichi walks home with Hiro and overhears some girls gleefully talking about Yuki in a fangirl type of way. And Shuichi can't help but think, does he really deserve Yuki?
5	"Winding Road"	November 1, 2000
Hiro and Shuichi were taking a walk through the park after their rehearsal, but they happen to notice a young girl getting manhandled by two older men. Shuichi and Hiro heroically rescue her with a series of smart retorts and wild punishment. After getting her fed and making sure she's alright, Shuichi asks why a young girl like herself could be wandering round the city from Kyoto. She replies and tells them that she is looking for somebody very important to her. Hiro offers to take her to a hotel, so Shuichi goes home to Yuki's. To his surprise, there is no Yuki but a strange man, who we find is his younger brother Tatsuha. Tatsuha and Shuichi get along very well for a while since they both have the same obsession with Ryuichi. After this Tatsuha teasingly gets a little too close to Shuichi, and Yuki appears behind them. When asked about his presence Tatsuha explains that he's looking for a girl, Ayaka, the girl that they had saved in the park. The next day Shuichi brings Tatsuha to Ayaka to only find out that she is, in fact, Yuki's fiancee! Shuichi is heartbroken. To make matters worse, Bad Luck's solo concert is very soon! Shuichi and the group go to perform on the stage but Shuichi spots Yuki and Ayaka in the crowd. In the middle of Shuichi's song he can't help but loudly scream "Yuki is mine!!!" Now Ayaka notices that Shuichi and Yuki have a strong relationship, and should back down. At the end of the episode Yuki confides in Shuichi and tells him that he will be his lover.
6	"Shady Scheme"	November 8, 2000
After yelling "Yuki is mine!!!!" during Bad Luck's live concert Shuichi thought Yuki would be angry, but to Shuichi's surprise he acted quite differently. Later, Yuki's sister, Mika, stops by Yuki's house to once again try and convince Yuki to come home with her. Shuichi and Mika spend time arguing about Yuki's good and bad qualities, Shuichi always calling Yuki sweet, and Mika disagreeing. In the end he locks them both out of the house out of annoyance. Mika asks Shuichi if he would like to go to get something to eat. During the course of the meal Mika tells Shuichi that he knows nothing about Yuki. This invokes Shuichi's curiosity, as no lover would like to be kept in the dark. While Shuichi and Mika are in the restaurant they are unaware that they are being spied on by ASK's lead singer Taki Aizawa and a lady friend of his. After Shuichi goes back home to apologize to Yuki about the argument he previously had that night, things go back to normal for a little while until Yuki tells Shuichi to leave, when he tries to delve deeper into the memories of Yuki. Hiro tells Shuichi that he should go apologize to Yuki for whatever he did wrong and while Shuichi was on his way home he ran into Taki from ASK who acted as Shuichi's friend but was really out to hurt him. After being beaten and raped by Taki's cronies, Shuichi goes to Hiro instead of Yuki because he doesn't want Yuki to get hurt and this causes Hiro to become angered and visit Yuki, to remind him of what he previously said "If you make him cry over anything but his own stupidity, I will never forgive you" Yuki, now angered over hearing that Shuichi was beaten up, goes to find Taki.
7	"Ground Zero"	November 15, 2000
Shuichi woke up that morning, with remembrance of the beating he received the previous night from the thugs Taki hired. He looked to see a note left to him by Hiro telling him that he should take the day off, he immediately went to the studio and told them that he was going to ruin their CD release... he was going to quit Bad Luck. But his announcement ran short when Hiro came to tell him that Yuki had gone after ASK to repay what they did to him. Yuki had ventured to where ASK was and had beat up Ma-kun, one of the members of ASK, And then threatened Taki to give him the photo roll that he had, which were filled with pictures of Shuichi's beating and sexual assault. Rather foolishly Shuichi ran to meet him and waited for him while wearing a sailor fuku. Outside, Shuichi went to grab Yuki so that he wouldn't leave him when he fainted on the ground. He woke up in a bed in Yuki's flat and was horrified to hear Yuki say that he will disappear from his life. Later on, Shuichi meets the others at their CD single recording and gives it his best, explaining that he has given up on Yuki to concentrate on his musical career and the band. Everybody is shocked. After the recording, Shuichi was walking home drunk with Hiro, and they arrive outside Yuki's flat and also meet Ayaka. They have a word and Shuichi runs into the flat and discovers that everything has gone! Yuki left him. Yuki's brother told him that he had one last chance and took him to their father's temple and told them that Ayaka was there to meet them. When the screen door opened however, it was not Ayaka, but Shuichi dressed as Ayaka! Yuki confronts him outside and finally discloses something about his past... When he was sixteen... he killed a man.
8	"Song and Song"	November 22, 2000
For some strange reason Touma has called Noriko, what can they be talking about? Also, Shuichi is now living with Yuki and Shuichi tells him that he has to go to work, but not before having a little laugh. When Shuichi leaves the bedroom Touma suddenly appears from the side of the bed. He and Yuki have a talk and Yuki tells him that he has told Shuichi about his past, and Touma comforts him. Meanwhile while Bad luck are at the studio, they are informed by their producer that they have an interview and they should present a good image. Shuichi Jokingly says that he will pass since he is meant to get home early to Yuki, at least until K holds a gun to his head (Yet again). Then they run to the Minivan on their way. Although in the lobby Taki becomes enraged at the fact that Shuichi's beating has had no effect on him and storms off to find Yuki. While at the interview one of the members of ASK storms in to warn Shuchi about Taki and his vendetta. Shuichi hurries home upon hearing this and bursts through a wall much to Yuki's surprise, yelling at Taki about hurting "His Yuki". When Taki flees from the scene, he comes across Touma who warns him about what he has just done, and pushes him in front of a car. Fortunately (or unfortunately) he survives and still vows to find out Yuki's secret. Bad Luck also get a very big surprise upon the announcement that Nittle Grasper has reformed. K gets them a place on a music show and they find that Nittle Grasper are also there. Bad luck give it their best but feel outshined by the performance of Nittle Grasper... Could this possibly be the end for them?
9	"The Deepest Brain"	November 29, 2000
This episode starts with Yuki lying down on a couch at a psychiatrist office, having a reminiscence of previous times such as when he was in a book store with his teacher in New York. Meanwhile, K is getting restless because Shuichi has not shown up for a while, and hs taken the week off sick. K, being a fan of guns and weapons decides to go after him, until he is stopped by Hiro, who tells them that he will go see Shuichi himself. While at Shuichi's place however he learns that Yuki has been having strange periods of absence, and when asked Shuichi says that he has not asked him why these are... Mainly out of fear of him. K also decides to have a word with Yuki in the park, where he tells him about Shuichi wanting to be like Ryuichi in terms of standard. He also explains that for Shuichi to achieve the same level, it is not money he needs, nor anything else apart from one thing. Out of his pocket he pulls a ticket, a ticket that entitles him to take Shuichi to a couple's amusement park. Yuki returns home to find Shuichi packing items in a box, it turns out that these items are, in fact, all the things to do with Ryuichi. Yuki then shows him the ticket, and tells him that if he makes one million copies, they will go. Shuichi becomes obsessed with getting a million copies of their cd sold and tells K to find any publicity he can, be it interviews, performances etc. And the band start to become more active. When Shuichi goes home the following day, he finds that Yuki is not there but, in fact, the press are storming the outside. When Yuki comes home he announces that he and Shuichi are lovers when Shuichi is cornered by a bunch of them. Meanwhile Hiro leaves the band... Is this final? or will he return?
10	"Heads or Tails"	December 7, 2000
Shuichi is upset to learn of Hiro's choice to leave the band. Fujisaki doesn't see the big deal. He could easily take over both parts.Hiro later tells Shuichi his feelings about the band and Ayaka which prompts Yuki to confront Ayaka. Ayaka later confronts Hiro and changes his mind about his recent decisions. Promising him a date if the band reached a million copies sold. A press conference is to be held later to announce Hiro's leaving. But to much surprise it is derailed due to a rant by Shuichi. Hiro then shows up and states that "he's convinced" and rejoins the band. Yuki is later seen at his home with his sister's husband spitting up blood after a drink.
11	"Secret Day"	December 13, 2000
This proves to be a high and low for Shuichi. First he's thrilled to have sold a million records. Which means date with Yuki. But then he learns that he's in the hospital from coughing up blood! After the press conference Shuichi is informed by K that Yuki is in the hospital coughing up blood. Shuichi then rushes to the hospital and is surprised to hear a very discouraging conversation taking place between Yuki, Mika, and Touma. He then leaves thinking that Yuki would be better off without him and that he is the reason that Yuki is in the hospital. He later returns to the hospital to see Yuki. He arrives while Yuki is sleeping and talks to him and is startled when Yuki awakens. Yuki then says that he owes Shuichi a date. On their date Yuki shares the grim details of his past with Shuichi. Shuichi then runs off to get drinks for the two but when he returns Yuki is gone.
12	"Breathless"	December 20, 2000
Shuichi returns home from his date with Yuki, but when he gets there he's nowhere to be found. Soon it gets clearer that Yuki's left him. Especially after getting a key to Yuki's apartment. So where did Yuki go? As Shuichi tries to deal with this he continues to perform. That is until after a concert Ryuichi ignores him. Why? And what just happened to Shuichi's voice?
13	"Got It All"	January 10, 2001
Shuichi's voice is still gone, Yuki is still missing. Everyone tries to help Shuichi but no one is succeeding. Touma and Mika are worried and are looking for Eiri. Can Shuichi find his voice again? Will anyone ever find Yuki? Will Shuichi ever see him again? Why does Yuki need a gun and why has he gone there?

=== Drama CDs ===
Eight audio dramas were produced for Gravitation, featuring most of the voice actors of the TV and OVA series. Five retell events from the manga series, while the remaining three cover new story material. The drama CDs also contain musical tracks performed by Japanese voice actors.

=== Other books ===
There are two novels based on Gravitation. The first one, released on November 30, 2000, follows the storyline for the OVAs. A second novel of Gravitation called Gravitation the Novel – voice the temptation (小説グラビテーション voice the temptation, Shōsetsu Gurabitēshon – voice the temptation) was written by Jun Lennon and released on September 30, 2002; it follows Shuichi as he goes on a chase throughout Japan to find the kidnapped Yuki. Both were published in North America by Tokyopop. The first was published on March 7, 2006, and the second was published on July 11, 2006, under the name Gravitation: voice of temptation. Both the novels were remade into a shinsō-ban edition and published on February 24, 2007.

Two "Complete Walkthrough Fan Book" (完全攻略ファンブック, Kanzen Kōryaku Fan Bukku) were released by Sony Magazines: the first was published on March 2, 1998, and the second one was published on August 7, 2000. Additionally, a fan book on the anime series was released on March 15, 2001.

== Reception ==
Almost half a million copies of the Gravitation manga have been sold from its North American release from 2003 to 2007, and in 2005 it was the top manga on BookScan with BL themes. Rachel Woods notes that even a milder shōnen-ai manga "relies on sexual innuendo, comic double entendres, and coded visual references in order to maintain an erotic undercurrent that is not sexually explicit in nature", and discusses a page from Gravitation which shows the characters kissing, but using "fragmented panels" which show Yuki's "wandering hand" to provide a "tantalizing and suggestive imagery" that encourages the reader's imagination.

Preceded by Hand Maid May (July 26, 2000 – September 27, 2000)	WOWOW Wednesday 18:30 Timeframe; Gravitation (October 4, 2000 – January 10, 2001)	Succeeded by Sadamitsu the Destroyer (January 17, 2001 – March 21, 2001)
