= List of programmes broadcast by TV3 (Malaysian TV network) =

This is a list of television programmes broadcast by TV3 either currently broadcast or formerly broadcast on TV3 in Malaysia.

== Drama ==
Rated 13 & 16 only

- Akasia
- Azalea
- Dahlia
- Lestary
- Samarinda
- Sakura

== News ==
=== TV3 News ===
Malay news:

- Buletin Pagi - Daily at 9:30 am
- Buletin 1:30 - Saturday to Thursday at 1:30 pm
- Detik Niaga - Monday to Friday at 5:30 pm
- Buletin Utama - Daily at 8:00 pm
- Berita Terkini (Which is Headline News) - Everydays, Every Hours

English news:

- Nightline - Daily at 12:00 midnight

== Bananana! block ==
- 44 Cats
- Android Kikaider
- Arthur
- American Dragon: Jake Long (aired on 2013-2015)
- Avatar: The Last Airbender
- Bakugan Battle Planet
- Bakugan (2023)
- Barbie movie series
- Barbie: Dreamtopia
- Battle Claw (also on TV2)
- Ben 10: Ultimate Alien
- Ben 10: Omniverse
- Beyblade Series
  - Metal Fight Beyblade
  - Beyblade Burst
  - Beyblade X (Upcoming)
- Blaze and the Monster Machines (also on TV2)
- BoBoiBoy
- BoBoiBoy Galaxy
- Bubble Guppies
- Bunsen Is a Beast
- Digimon Adventure
- Dora the Explorer
- Deer Squad
- Ejen Ali (2016 - 2018)
- Go, Diego, Go!
- Kamen Rider Series
  - Kamen Rider: Dragon Knight
  - Kamen Rider Build
  - Kamen Rider Zi-O
  - Kamen Rider Zero-One
- Kim Possible (also aired on NTV7, starting in June 2014)
- Kung Fu Panda: Legends of Awesomeness (also airs on NTV7)
- Larva
- Lego series
  - Lego City Adventures
  - Lego Friends - Girls on a Mission
  - Lego Monkie Kid (also aired on NTV7 & 8TV)
  - Lego Ninjago
- My Little Pony: Friendship Is Magic (formerly aired on NTV7)
- Maggie & Bianca: Fashion Friends
- My Little Pony: Pony Life
- Oggy and the Cockroaches
- Ollie and Friends
- Paw Patrol
- Penguins of Madagascar
- Peppa Pig
- Pokémon Series
  - Pokémon Sun and Moon
  - Pokémon Sun and Moon Ultra Adventures
- Power Rangers
  - Power Rangers Dino Supercharge (rerun from NTV7 starting 7 February 2019)
- The Powerpuff Girls (2016 reboot)
- Postman Pat (Series 3-8)
- Rabbids Invasion (formerly aired on NTV7)
- Rat-A-Tat
- Recess (aired on 2013)
- Rise of the Teenage Mutant Ninja Turtles
- Robot and Monster
- Rolling with the Ronks!
- Senario Toons
- Shimmer and Shine
- Sing & Dance with Barney
- Sofia the First
- Special Rescue Exceedraft
- SpongeBob SquarePants
- StoryBots Super Songs
- Superbook
- Super Sentai
  - Zyuden Sentai Kyoryuger (moved from NTV7 during repeat since 31 December 2018)
- TaleSpin (aired on 2013)
- Team Umizoomi
- Teacher's Pet
- Teletubbies (2015 series)
- The Adventures of Jimmy Neutron
- The Adventures of Kid Danger
- The Amazing Awang Khenit
- The Fairly OddParents
- The Proud Family (aired on 2012-2013)
- The Troop
- Thomas & Friends
- Top Wing
- Trolls: The Beat Goes On!
- True and the Rainbow Kingdom
- Turning Mecard
- Victorious
- Wallykazam!

== Japanese imports ==
- Aikatsu! (Malaysian dubbed, and opening and closing theme are dubbed in Malaysia)
- Aoashi
- Astroboy
- Atashinchi
- Beyblade
- Bleach
- Blue Dragon (TV series)
- Card Captor Sakura
- Crush Gear Turbo
- Date A Live
- Detective Conan
- Fullmetal Alchemist
- Initial D
- Lucy of the Southern Rainbow
- Mirmo Zibang
- Mermaid Melody Pichi Pichi Pitch
- Mon Colle Knights
- My Annette
- Naruto
- Rurouni Kenshin
- Samurai 7
- Super Doll Licca
- Nanook's Great Hunt

== International programmes ==
- Agents of S.H.I.E.L.D. (ABC)
- Arrow (The CW)
- Blade: The Series (Spike)
- Caught on Camera (MSNBC) (Reality Television - Documentary - News)
- Changing Rooms Australia (Network Ten)
- Cloak & Dagger (Freeform)
- CSI: Crime Scene Investigation (CBS)
- Dawson's Creek (The WB)
- Disorderly Conduct: Video on Patrol (Spike)
- Extreme Makeover Home Edition USA (ABC)
- Grey's Anatomy (ABC)
- Hannibal (NBC)
- Heroes (NBC)
- Human Weapon (History Channel)
- Kyle XY (ABC Family)
- Master in the House (SBS)
- Most Daring (Court TV & truTV)
- Most Shocking (Court TV & truTV)
- Mr. Bean
- MXC (Most Extreme Elimination Challenge) (Spike)
- NCIS (CBS)
  - NCIS: Los Angeles (CBS)
- No Ordinary Family (ABC)
- Prison Break (FOX)
- Riverdale (The CW)
- Runaways (Hulu)
- Smallville (The CW)
- Supernatural (The CW)
- Top 20 Funniest (truTV)
- The Apprentice (NBC)
- The Flash (The CW)
- The Titan Games (NBC)
- Unbeatable Banzuke
- WWE SmackDown
- WWF SmackDown
- World's Most Amazing Videos (NBC & Spike)
- World's Wildest Police Videos (Spike)
- World's Wildest Vacation Videos (truTV)

== Religious programmes ==
- Al-Kuliyyah - a religious talk show programme which discuss the topics related to Islam; aired since 1995
- Kapsul Surah
- Tanyalah Ustaz

== Documentaries ==
- 360
- 999
- Bersamamu - a real-life documentary program focused on the underprivileged in Malaysia; aired since 2005
- Detik Tragik - a documentary series focused on major disasters happened in Malaysia; premiered in April 2015
- Fail Mahkamah
- Ilmuwan Islam - a religious documentary show focused on Muslim scholars and scientists; aired in 2005
- Jejak Rasul - religious documentary series focused on the history of Islam and Muhammad; aired since 1994 during the Ramadhan fasting month
- KES: Kronologi. Eksklusif. Siasatan. - crime documentary series focused on high-profiled crime cases reported in Malaysia; aired in 2010
- Majalah 3 - a flagship magazine program aired since 1987
- Nona - a women's magazine program aired since 1985.
- Op Maritim

Notes: 999 will be back on air starting 22 December 2020 because of the live broadcast Muzik Muzik 35 Separuh Akhir Third week which aired on Tuesday after broadcast this delayed to 22 November ago.

== Talk shows ==
- Borak Kopitiam - a weekend morning talk show program aired Saturday & Sunday; aired since 2018 replacing MHI's weekend slot
- Malaysia Hari Ini - a morning talk show program aired on weekdays since 1994
- Soal Jawab - a talk show program which discusses topics related on current situation
- Soal Rakyat - a talk show program which discusses topics related on current situation, aired since 2018 (Season 1 - Since 2018: Wednesday 11:00 pm to 12:00 am) (Season 2 - Since 2020: Saturday 5:30 pm to 6:30 pm)
- Wanita Hari Ini - a women's talk show program which discusses topics related to Malaysian womanhood, aired since 2001
- Hello Doktor

== Entertainment and variety shows ==
- Melodi
- Muzik-Muzik
- Muzik Muzik 35 Separuh Akhir
- Vokal Mania
- Lagu Cinta Kita
- The Sherry Show
- J.K.K
- I Can See Your Voice Malaysia
- Sumbang Suara
- Terpaling Juara

=== Special entertainment programs ===
- Anugerah Bintang Popular
- Anugerah Juara Lagu
- Anugerah Melodi Drama Sangat
- Anugerah Skrin

== Food and cooking programs ==
- 5 Rencah 5 Rasa
- Jalan-Jalan Cari Makan
- Sarapan
- Spice Routes

== Sports ==
- Scoreboard
- Soccer News
- WWE Smackdown
- Malaysia Super League

== Travel shows ==
- Go Travel (also aired on TV9 and Awesome TV) and (formerly in TV2)
- Master in the House Malaysia (16 January 2022) (Sunday 3:00 pm to 4:00 pm)
- Wa! Journey - Go Green in Japan

== Former programming ==
=== 1980s ===
- Gumby
- Kate and Allie
- Wiseguy
- Roseanne
- Family Ties
- The Lonely Hunter
- Hind and Dr. Noman
- Wildfire
- Dennis the Menace
- Mission: Impossible
- The Smurfs
- The Transformers
- Nona
- The Edison Twins
- Woody Woodpecker
- Cheers
- Ghostbusters
- Fraggle Rock
- Tandoori Nights
- She-Ra: Princess of Power
- I Dream of Jeannie
- The Flintstone Kids
- Small Wonder
- Buletin Utama
- Sukan TV3
- The Benny Hill Show
- Cerekarama
- Jason of Star Command
- The Munsters Today
- The Get Along Gang
- Alfred Hitchcock Presents
- The S.I.B. Files
- Spenser: For Hire
- Mighty Mouse and Friends
- Three's Company
- Exciting World of Speed and Beauty
- Hill Street Blues
- TV3 Cinema
- Punky Brewster
- Disney's Adventures of the Gummi Bears
- L.A. Law
- Shadow Chasers
- Knight Rider
- Star Wars: Droids
- Voyage to the Bottom of the Sea
- National Geographic Explorer
- Scarecrow and Mrs. King
- Birds of Paradise
- Maya the Bee
- Stingray
- The In between
- Jamaluddin El-Afghani
- Starsky & Hutch
- The Bluffers
- Crime Story
- Out of This World
- Family Ties
- Care Bears
- Wild, Wild World of Animals
- Zoo Raya Ria
- The Blinkins
- Yesterday's Glitter
- Heathcliff
- Beyond Tomorrow
- Hotel
- Captain Power and the Soldiers of the Future
- He-Man and the Masters of the Universe
- The Love Boat
- Tom and Jerry
- Emerald Point N.A.S.
- Here's Lucy
- Cumi and Ciki
- Mama's Boy
- Games People Play
- Mighty Mouse: The New Adventures
- Furaso
- The Adventures of the Little Prince
- Macron 1
- Memori '84
- Airwolf
- The Adventures of the Galaxy Rangers
- The Wacky Wife
- Magnum, P.I.
- Better Days
- Starman
- Panggung Perdana
- Super Friends
- Simon and Simon
- The Giddy Game Show
- Mid-Week Sports
- Bozo the Clown
- The Beverly Hillbillies
- Ohara
- Cerekapilihan
- Majalah 3
- Spider-Woman
- Dr. Kildare
- ThunderCats
- Jenny's Gang
- It Ain't Half Hot Mum
- My Sister Sam
- Paradise
- Think of a Number
- Zoo Family
- Robotech
- She's the Sheriff
- S.W.A.T.
- News in Bahasa Malaysia
- Sidekicks
- The Benny Hill Show
- Starcom: The U.S. Space Force
- The Final Verdict
- Moonlighting
- Knots Landing
- The Wild Wild West
- The Secrets of Isis
- Thirtysomething

=== 1990s ===
- Buletin Utama
- Evening News
- Buletin 1:30
- Buletin Awal
- Majalah 3
- News Hour
- Laman Nurani
- Al Kuliyyah
- Jejak Rasul
- Muzik Muzik
- Wanita Hari Ini
- Malaysia Hari Ini
- Sinaran 7
- Alam Ria Disney
- Cereka Pilihan
- Sunday Movie
- Cereka Cuti Sekolah
- Tayangan Minggu Ini
- Cerekarama
- Selekta Emas
- Panggung Sabtu
- Identiti
- Dari Bilik Berita
- L.A. Law
- Imej
- Sekapur Sirih
- Nona
- Warta 3
- Money Matters
- 7 O'Clock News
- Citra Wara
- Mike Hammer, Private Eye
- Jade Solid Gold
- Beyond Tomorrow
- America's Top 10
- True Colors
- Kuali Besta
- Enak Rasa Knorr & Lady Choice
- Anika Rasa Kraft
- Menu Malaysia
- Kisah Benar
- Cuba-Cuba
- Benson & Hedges Gold & Dream
- Mad About You
- Dragon Flyz
- Dinosaucers
- Galeri Sukan
- Just the Ten of Us
- Full House
- Star Trek: The Next Generation
- Conan The Adventurer
- 321 Action
- WWF Superstars
- WWF Smackdown
- UEFA Champions League
- German League Highlights
- Spanish League Highlights
- English Premier League Highlights
- Marlboro World Of Sport
  - Formula 1
  - Italian League Serie A
- Raze the Roof with Collette
- Chip 'n Dale: Rescue Rangers
- Ocean Girl
- Bodies for Evidence
- Alfred Hitchcock Presents
- The Magical Adventures of Quasimodo
- Airwolf
- The Country Mouse and the City Mouse Adventures
- L.A. Heat
- Growing Pains
- Sharky & George
- National Geographic Explorer
- Life Goes On
- Alvin and the Chipmunks
- Voltron: Defender of the Universe
- S.W.A.T.
- Denver, the Last Dinosaur
- The Tom and Jerry Kids Show
- ProStars
- The Golden Girls
- Grimm's Fairy Tale Classics
- Rescue 911
- ALF
- Doogie Howser, M.D.
- Top of the Hill
- Jade Comedy
- Mr. Bogus
- Webster
- Knight Rider
- Father Dowling Mysteries
- Diplodos
- Mike and Angelo
- Simba the Lion King
- Family Ties
- Family Squad
- Art Attack
- Star Street: The Adventures of the Star Kids
- Cupido
- Waktu Berbuka Puasa & Imsak
- Big Brother Jake
- Maxie's World
- Zorro
- Felix the Cat
- Darkwing Duck
- The New WKRP in Cincinnati
- Rugrats
- The Munsters Today
- Mount Royal
- Camp Candy
- Galtar and the Golden Lance
- The Jetsons
- Attack of the Killer Tomatoes
- Seabert
- Pi Mai Pai Mai Tang Tu
- The Golden Palace
- Tiny Toon Adventures
- Fantastic Max
- Captain Planet and the Planeteers
- Dynasty
- The All-New Candid Camera
- China Beach
- Star Wars: Droids
- Rupert
- MacGyver
- Laff-A-Lympics
- My Secret Identity
- The Magical World of Disney
- Gophers!
- The Disappearing World
- Alien Nation
- The Smurfs
- Free Spirit
- Camp Wilderness
- Ragam Orang Kota
- Twinkle the Dream Being
- Head of the Class
- Baby Talk
- Room for Two
- The Mechanical Universe
- Tales of the Gold Monkey
- DuckTales
- Yuppies on the Move
- Dynamo Duck
- ALF: The Animated Series
- Saber Rider and the Star Sheriffs
- Cheers
- Wiseguy
- Moonlighting
- Thunder Alley
- Hawaii 5-0
- Around the World in 15 Minutes
- Star Trek: The Animated Series
- Rude Dog and the Dweebs
- Eureeka's Castle
- The Legend of the Fall
- First Look
- Bush Beat
- Midnight Caller
- Postman Pat (Series 1-2)
- Doug
- Stunt Dawgs
- The New Adventures of Captain Planet
- The Adventures of Don Coyote and Sancho Panda
- Roseanne
- The Young Riders
- Little Rosey
- Inhumanoids
- Brewster Place
- Home Improvement
- The Fresh Prince of Bel-Air
- Katts and Dog
- The New Adventures of He-Man
- CyberCOPS
- Trial by Jury
- 13 Wonders
- Cow and Chicken
- Kingdom of Survival
- Tarzán
- The Secret World of Alex Mack
- Power Hits USA
- Blossom
- Toxic Crusaders
- Great Expectations
- Wide World of Kids
- Dumbo's Circus
- Robotech
- Kitty Cats
- Popeye the Sailor
- The Simpsons
- Little Star
- Spenser: For Hire
- Chicken Minute
- Ferris Bueller
- Disney's Adventures of the Gummi Bears
- The Tracey Ullman Show
- Garfield and Friends
- Paddington Bear
- AlfTales
- My Two Dads
- Counterstrike
- The Mickey Mouse Club
- Paradise
- Dink, the Little Dinosaur
- Sally the Sea Lion
- Empty Nest
- The Avengers
- Dear John
- Garrison's Gorillas
- Sister Kate
- Pound Puppies
- Babar
- Malay Blockbuster
- Foofur
- Johnny Bravo
- Doogie Howser, M.D.
- Tayangan Minggu Ini
- Cross of Fire
- Homeboys in Outer Space
- He-Man and the Masters of the Universe
- The Odyssey
- Aladdin
- Iron Man
- G-Force
- Mutt and Jeff
- I Love Amy
- All the Rivers Run
- TaleSpin
- The Wild West
- Sisters
- Chucklewood Critters
- Love of a Longtime
- Widget
- My Little Pony 'n Friends
- The Famous Teddy Z
- The Nutt House
- Oh, Mr. Toad
- Angel Falls
- Kidd Video
- The Shoe People
- Yogi's Gang
- Wild and Crazy Kids
- The Sullivans
- Pick of the Week
- The All-New Popeye Show
- 21 Jump Street
- Big Wave Dave's
- Evening Shade
- Baby and Co.
- Dinosaur!
- Spiral Zone
- Darl BSKL
- Zero One Magazine
- Happy Days
- Honey, I Shrunk the Kids: The TV Show
- USA: Futures
- The Adventures of Skippy
- Dr. Quinn, Medicine Woman
- Cobra
- A Pup Named Scooby-Doo
- Ketchup: Cats Who Cook
- 1990 Castrol Motorcross
- The Professionals
- Walker, Texas Ranger
- Goof Troop
- Mad About You
- Droopy, Master Detective
- Dinobabies
- Lois & Clark: The New Adventures of Superman
- Star Trek: The Animated Series
- Rain in the Heart
- Midnight Caller
- Walking Tall
- A Family for Joe
- Return of Ultraman
- Ultraman Ace
- Ultraman Taro
- The Ultraman
- Ultraman 80
- Ultraman: The Ultimate Hero
- Choujin Sentai Jetman

=== 2000s ===
- Buletin Utama
- Buletin Pagi
- Buletin 1:30
- Majalah 3
- 360
- 999
- Oggy and the Cockroaches
- Bob the Builder
- The Real Ghostbusters
- Disney's The Little Mermaid
- Fly Tales
- Honey, I Shrunk the Kids: The TV Show
- Little Monsters
- The Wacky World of Tex Avery
- Pingu
- The Why Why Family
- Count Duckula
- Godzilla: The Animated Series
- X-Men: Evolution
- Bleach
- Teenage Mutant Ninja Turtles
- Gang Starz
- Totally Tooned In
- Ketchup: Cats Who Cook
- Earth: Final Conflict
- Mighty Max
- WWF Smackdown
- Showbiz Tycoon
- The Wonderful World of Disney
- Noddy in Toyland
- Mother Goose and Grimm
- Family Guy
- Space Goofs
- The Dapatuto Show
- Formula 1
- Under One Roof
- Stunt Dawgs
- Pinky and the Brain
- Hercules
- Transformers: Beast Machines
- Toonsylvania
- The New Adventures of Ocean Girl
- Ronald McDonald's Funtime
- KFC Hour
- Danger Mouse
- The Magician
- Cubeez
- Bollywood Dot Com
- Angela Anaconda
- Sakura Wars
- Dave the Barbarian
- Dora the Explorer
- Teamo Supremo
- Sesame Street
- Kelab Disney Malaysia
- Chicky Hour
- W.I.T.C.H.
- Winx Club
- Crush Gear Turbo
- The Crocodile Hunter's Croc Files
- The West Wing
- My Wife and Kids
- Justice League
- Teacher's Pet
- The Adventures of Jimmy Neutron, Boy Genius
- Funtoons
- Extreme Ghostbusters
- Futurama
- Totally Spies!
- SpongeBob SquarePants
- Woody Woodpecker
- Asia Hebat
- Ultra Seven
- House of Mouse
- Jellabies
- Dark Knight
- Brandy & Mr. Whiskers
- Amazing Stories
- DuckTales
- Xiaolin Showdown
- Baby Looney Tunes
- That's So Raven
- Bratz
- Gang Starz
- A Minute with Stan Hooper
- Looney Tunes
- Tom and Jerry
- Tom and Jerry Tales
- The Night Stalker
- Disney's Adventures of the Gummi Bears
- MTV Pulse
- The Emperor's New School
- Shuriken School
- Harry and His Bucket Full of Dinosaurs
- Bizworld
- Super Robot Monkey Team Hyperforce Go!
- Pucca (TV series)
- Ultraman Nexus
- Ultraman Max

=== 2010s ===
- 999
- 2014 Asian Games (With TV9, coverage provided by host broadcaster Incheon Asian Games Host Broadcasting Management (IHB))
- 2014 Commonwealth Games (With NTV7, coverage provided by host broadcaster Sunset + Vine Global Television Host Broadcasting Limited (SVGTV))
- Avatar: The Last Airbender
- Barney & Friends
- Beyblade
- Ben 10: Alien Force
- Ben 10: Ultimate Alien
- Chuggington
- Detective Conan
- Kally's Mashup
- Law & Order: Special Victims Unit
- Naruto
- Nur
- Putri Yang Ditukar
- Soy Luna (Dubbed in English with Malay Subtitles, also airs on TV2, TV9 and NTV7)
- SpongeBob SquarePants
- Southeast Asian Games (Until 2017)
- Teacher's Pet
- UEFA Champions League
- Hannah Montana

=== 2020s ===
- Money Matters (Rerun show from 1990s) (Season 1: 4 July 2020, Saturday 6:00 pm to 6:30 pm) (Season 2: 10 October 2020, Saturday 5:00 pm to 5:30 pm)
- Gerak Khas The Finale (after more than 21 years of broadcasting on RTM), (Gerak Khas The Finale is now understood to start aired on TV3) (Breaking of 4 December 2020, Friday and Saturday 10:30 pm to 11:30 pm)
