= Zainal Rashid Ahmad =

Malaysian journalist

- زين الرشيد احمد
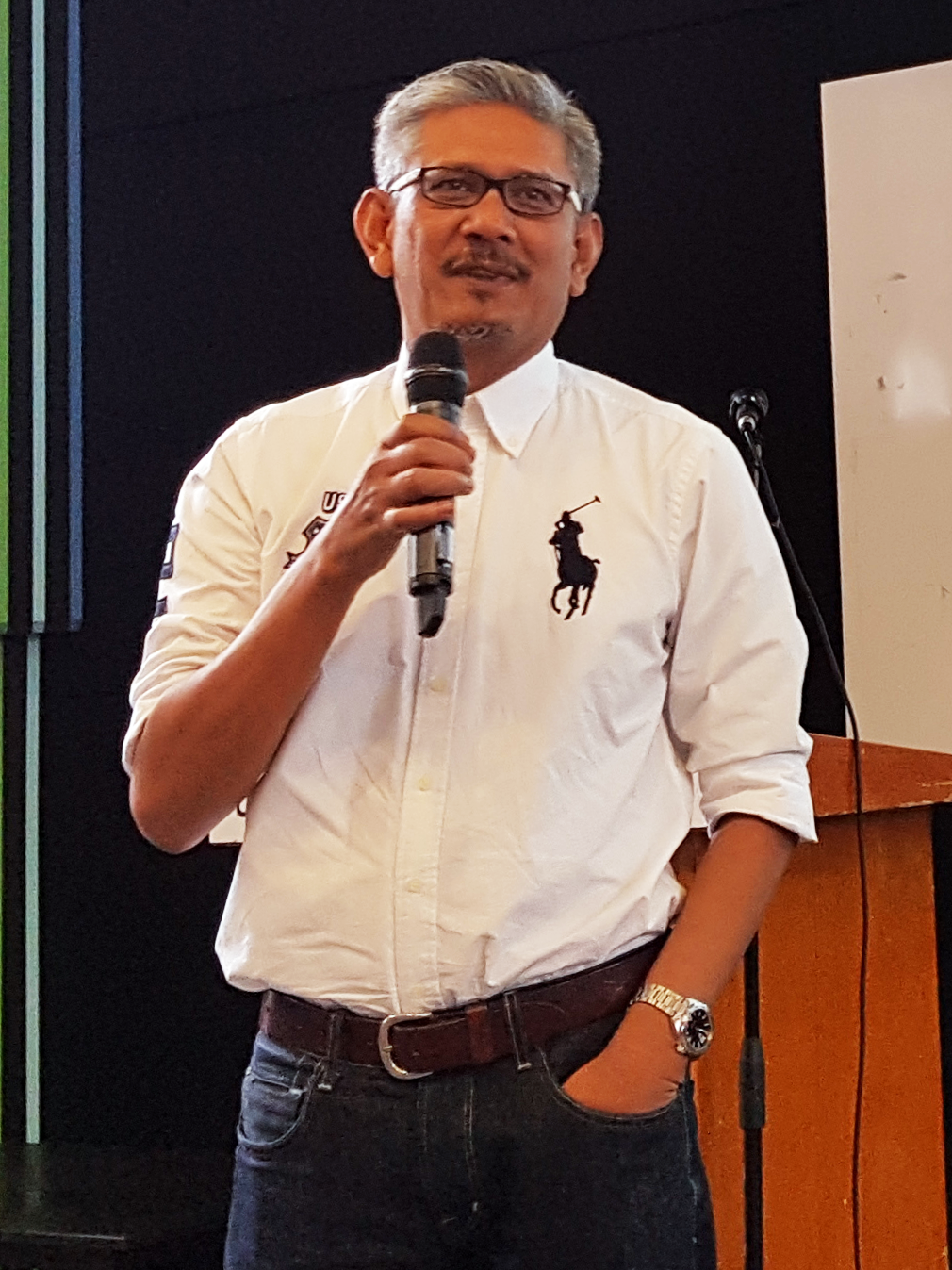
- Zainal in 2018
- Born: Zainal Rashid bin Ahmad; June 30, 1967 (age 59); Alor Setar, Kedah, Malaysia
- Other name: ZRA
- Education: Universiti Sains Malaysia
- Occupation: Journalist
- Years active: 1990–present
- Known for: First Malaysian to do a documentary in Israel
- Notable work: Ziarah Gaza (2005 documentary); Kembara Gaza (2008 documentary)
- Children: Ilham Fansuri Zainal

Zainal Rashid bin Ahmad (Jawi: زين الرشيد بن احمد; Born 30 June 1967), also known as ZRA, is a journalist and litterateur from Malaysia. He has received 7 journalism and 46 literature awards, and is known as the first Malaysian journalist to successfully get into Israel and Palestine to document the state of Muslims in the two countries, which he did twice in 2005 and in 2008. In 2025, he took part in the Global Sumud Flotilla, along with his daughter Ilham Fansuri, to break the Israeli blockade of the Gaza Strip,

Zainal is known for his works and contributions to contemporary media in Malaysia. Aside from gaining access into Israel and Palestine twice, he also founded the company, Astro FM, and was one of the three key founders of TV Alhijrah, where he was Senior Vice President. Since 2020, he has been focusing on online streaming under the branding ZRA STRIM.

== Early life and education ==
Zainal was born on 30 June 1967 to Yom binti Che Din (1942–2022) and Ahmad bin Saman (1933–2004) in Alor Setar, Kedah, Malaysia. At the age of 17, he moved to Kuala Lumpur and later furthered his studies at Universiti Sains Malaysia, Pulau Pinang in 1991 in Creative Writing.

== Journalism and writing ==
Zainal gained prominence in literature when his poem "Genderang Perang" (Drums of War) was published in the Dewan Sastera magazine. However, his interest leaned closer towards writing short stories, which he has, up until 2024, published over 300 of. He is known to blend the style of old and modern Malay literature in his literatures. Among his notable works include Al-Kisah (2012), Yang Tercinta (2012), Empunya Hikayat (2014), Hikayat Tanah Jauh (2015), Sekuntum Bunga Neraka (2019), Matinya Saksi yang Lupa Makan Malam (2020), Magis Kota (2015) and Pop Urban (2017).

He also still publishes his collection of poetry works such as Sepi Itu Mati (2016), Orang Sepi Pergi ke Gurun (2017), and Dodoi Buat Kelasi yang Pasrah Pada Hidupnya (2019). He has also written the a few novels including 'Latto Asmiranda' (2017) and Cinta Merpati Musim Perang (2019). His story titled Cinta Ahmad Mutawakkil (The Love of Ahmad Mutawakkil) was used in the textual antology for literary component (Komsas) for the Malay language subject for Sijil Pelajaran Malaysia (SPM), the Malaysian national examination. A lot of his works were published by Institut Terjemahan & Buku Malaysia (ITBM). He has won more than 40 awards in literature, most notably the Utusan Literature Award, Perdana Literature Award, Islamic Literature Award, and many others on the national level.

In 1994, Zainal began his journalism work, serving Utusan Group (1994–1996) and Astro (1996–1998), before becoming the Newsroom Manager and Senior Producer for Edisi Siasat on NTV7 (1995–2005). In 2006, he founded Astro FM as CEO and Creative Director with a focus on documentary production, until 2010 when he co-founded TV Alhijrah as Senior Vice President of Production, Marketing, and Media Sales Strategy. He served TV Alhijrah for nine years until 2019, before working on independent journalism under his own ZRA STRIM.

His journalism works have awarded him the Best Documentary Award in 2004 and 2010, Media Award of Defence in 2009, and many other awards as director and scriptwriter.

=== Documentary on Israel and Palestine ===
In 2005, Zainal led a team of six media personnel in successfully getting into Israel and Palestine disguised as tourists. This allowed them to document the life of Palestinians in the West Bank after 40 years of occupation under Israel, and they showed it in a documentary made for TV3 that was titled Majalah 3. Zainal was the first Malaysian journalist to successfully conduct his work in Israel in the documentary. He managed get into Israel a second time to make another documentary in 2008 under Astro Oasis, titled Kembara Palestin. This documentary was awarded 'Best Documentary Award in 2010'.

== Participation in Global Sumud Flotilla ==
Location where the Fair Lady vessel was last detected.

Zainal boarded the Fair Lady vessel along with five other participants including from Ireland, Mexico, and South Africa. The boat was intercepted by Israeli forces at 4 AM (local time), but was initially allowed to continue sailing after a brief interrogation. At around 9 AM, while around 60 nautical miles away from the Gaza coast and still in international waters, Israeli ships were again seen on the vessel's CCTV, before all communications were cut out, presumably due to signal jamming. Zainal, along with the other five participants are still noted as missing and presumed to be arrested by Israel, with no information on them heard of.

He would later be confirmed to have been arrested by Israeli forces and deported to Turkey on 4 October.
