= Gang Star =

Gang Star may refer to:

- Gangstar, a video game series
- Gang Starr, an American hip hop group
- Gangstars, an Indian TV series
- Gang Starz, a Malaysian reality show
- The Gang Stars, a professional wrestling tag team better known as Cryme Tyme
