= Ayaka Konno =

Japanese actress and model (born 1999)

- Konno in 2026
- Born: June 24, 1999 (age 27); Chiba, Chiba, Japan
- Occupations: Actress; model
- Years active: 2002–present
- Agent: Spacecraft
- Modeling information
- Height: 164 cm (5 ft 5 in)
- Hair color: black
- Eye color: brown

Japanese name
- Kanji: 紺野 彩夏
- Hiragana: こんの あやか
Transcriptions
- Romanization: Konno Ayaka

Ayaka Konno (紺野 彩夏, Konno Ayaka; born June 24, 1999) is a Japanese actress and model who is affiliated with the agency Spacecraft.

== Early life and career ==
Ayaka Konno was born on June 24, 1999, in the city of Chiba, in Chiba Prefecture, Japan. She is the middle child of three siblings, with an older sister eleven years her senior and one younger sister. She can play the piano, having practiced it from the age of 4 to 17 years old.

She joined her current agency when she was a child and made her acting debut as a child actress at the age of 3.

After appearing in the TV Tokyo series Piramekino (2005–2019), she gained recognition from audiences for her "amazingly transparent" acting.

Parallel to her acting career, she has also worked as an exclusive model for the fashion magazine Seventeen by Shueisha. In 2018, she played her first regular role, as a villain called Ora in Kamen Rider Zi-O by TV Asahi.

With the January issue of Seventeen released on December 1, 2020, she "graduated" from being their exclusive model. She then became an exclusive model for the March issue of the fashion magazine Non-no that was published in January 2021.

== Filmography ==
=== Films ===
Year	Title	Role	Notes	Ref.
2017	Family Restaurant	Akemi Kikuchihara		
2018	Liverleaf	Risako Kato		
2021	Wadaiko Girls	Tamaki Matsuzawa	Lead role	
2022	Bungo Stray Dogs The Movie: Beast	Gin		
2022	Gray Wall Gear	Sayuri Yoshida		

=== Television ===
Year	Title	Role	Notes	Ref.
2010	The Golden Piggy	Shinko Tsutsumi (teen)		
2012	Becoming a Doctor at Age 37	Mizuki Sawamura		
2012	Bunshin		Drama W production; episode 1	
2018	Everyone's Olympics 2 "Raise your bangs"			
2018–19	Kamen Rider Zi-O	Ora		
2020	And Then There was One Yuriko	Juri Asaka		
2021	Liked! Hikaru Genji-kun	Murasaki no Ue	Season 2	
2021	Silver Plan to Start Over from JK	Hayana Shiraishi		
2022	Graduation Time Limit	Mio Komatsu		
2022	The Instant Ramen Arrangement Club	Arisa Sakakibara		
2022	100 Pictures, 100 Regrets	Hazuki Itono	Web drama	
2022	Masked D	Akira Kobayashi	Web drama	
2022	Mangaka Ienaga Explains Complex World	Kurara Matsuki		
2022	We Don't Fall in Love	Kanako Sasano	Short vertical drama	
2022	My First Night Play	Karen	Web drama	
2022	Two Uniform Numbers 4	Mayu Mogi		
2022	Love You Just as You Are	Mahiro Yokoyama		
2023	School Counselor	Shiori Hamura	Web drama	
2023	My Husband: That Girl's Lover	Mutsumi Mishima		
2023	Subscription Girls	Tomo	Lead role	
2023	The Shadows of Who We Once Were	Irina Hazuki		
2023	Code Japan: Price of Wishes	Miyu	Episode 2	
2023	I Cannot Reach You	Mikoto Ohara		
2023	100 Days Until You Die	Chiaki Sato	Episode 4	
2024	I Want to Break up with the Man I Love	Nana Oda		
2024	Shikaku		Lead role; Episode 2	
2024	The Science Club	Mai Shoji		
2024	Gezan Meshi	Saya	Short drama	
2025	Seal My Lips With a Kiss	Sato Kaede	Lead role	
2025	The Revenge Lover	Maika Hattori	Lead role	
2025	Dr. Ashura	Akane Sawamura	Episode 6	
2025	The Yakuza Boss's Beloved	Makoto Sugawara	Lead role	
2025	Fogdog	Aiko Usami	Episodes 5–6	
2026	Yokohama Neighbors	Azusa Yamagata	Season 1–2	
2026	Delinquent to Doctor	Ruka Uchimura	Episode 9	
2026	First Cry	Nao Ayukawa	Episodes 1–2	
2026	How Do We Relationship?	Yuria Washio		
