= List of Kamen Rider Zi-O episodes =

Kamen Rider Zi-O is a Japanese tokusatsu drama in Toei Company's Kamen Rider series. It is the twentieth and final series in the Heisei period run and the twenty-ninth series overall. The series tells the story of a young man who, according to visitors from the future, is destined to become a tyrant who will subjugate the entire world, and embarks on a journey across time to change his fate; meeting other Kamen Riders from the past along the way.

== Episodes ==
No.	Title	Directed by	Written by	Original release date
1	"Kingdom 2068"; Transliteration: "Kingudamu Nisen-rokujū-hachi" (Japanese: キングダム2068)	Ryuta Tasaki	Kento Shimoyama	September 2, 2018
Sougo Tokiwa is an 18-year-old high school student who dreams of becoming a king. After discovering a mysterious watch-like device, Sougo encounters two time travelers: a resistance fighter named Geiz Myokoin and a woman named Tsukuyomi, who reveals that Sougo became a tyrannical dictator known as Ohma Zi-O in the year 2068. While Tsukuyomi is trying to divert Sougo from that destiny, Geiz seeks to kill him before he gains his power. Meanwhile, a young basketball player is turned into a monstrous version of Kamen Rider Build, who sets about attacking sports players. After becoming separated in the timestream, Sougo travels to 2017 and briefly encounters Sento Kiryu and Ryūga Banjō. Returning to the present, Sougo encounters the prophet Woz, who assures him of his destiny of becoming king, so Sougo decides to embrace it and become a good demon king. With the blank watch awakening, Sougo becomes Kamen Rider Zi-O and defeats Another Build. Seeing that Tsukuyomi has failed in trying to prevent Sougo from obtaining Zi-O's power, Geiz transforms into Kamen Rider Geiz to personally kill him.: This episode is a tribute to Kamen Rider Build.
2	"Best Match 2017"; Transliteration: "Besuto Matchi Nisen-jū-nana" (Japanese: ベストマッチ2017)	Ryuta Tasaki	Kento Shimoyama	September 9, 2018
Sougo manages to escape Geiz and learns that Another Build survived his attack, learning that a mysterious organization known as the Time Jackers are replacing Kamen Riders with their own twisted versions. While Geiz is unable to defeat Another Build due to his continuous revival, Sougo locates Sento Kiryū and Ryūga Banjō, but realizes that they lost their memories as a side effect of Another Build's existence. During a brief period of defeat, Sento and Ryūga regain their memories long enough to hand Sougo the Build and Cross-Z Ride Watches and a hint that the only way to defeat another Rider is to do so in the year they manifested. Zi-O and Geiz travel to 2017 to help Kamen Riders Build and Cross-Z battle Another Build. Things look bleak until Sougo uses the Build Ride Watch to equip the Build Armor, allowing him to permanently defeat Another Build and restore history. Returning home, Sougo discovers that Geiz and Tsukuyomi are his new housemates.: This episode is a tribute to Kamen Rider Build as it continues the events of episode 1.
3	"Doctor Gamer 2018"; Transliteration: "Dokutā Gēmā Nisen-jū-hachi" (Japanese: ドクターゲーマー2018)	Shojiro Nakazawa	Kento Shimoyama	September 16, 2018
By Tsukuyomi's request, Geiz delays his plan to kill Sougo as they are both confused as to how a kindly person could become Ohma Zi-O, and they decide to keep watching him for a while by following him closely, even when he is in class. Sougo manages to evade them at school, but is surprised by Another Ex-Aid attacking his classmate. The three take heed of a mystery related an unbeatable game and several children who played it are now in critical condition in Seito University Hospital, which puts them on the trail of Genius Gamer M.: This episode is a tribute to Kamen Rider Ex-Aid.
4	"No Continue 2016"; Transliteration: "Nō Kontinyū Nisen-jū-roku" (Japanese: ノーコンティニュー2016)	Shojiro Nakazawa	Kento Shimoyama	September 23, 2018
Because of the Time Jackers' interference, another Kamen Rider-like monster was created, erasing all memories of Kamen Rider Ex-Aid from history. Sougo and his companions offer their help to Emu Hojo so he can regain his powers, but Emu insists that he must do it his own way. Geiz instructs Sougo not to transform to ensure he doesn't become Ohma Zi-O, and leaves to 2016 to defeat Another Ex-Aid shortly after it was created. Investigating further in 2018, Sougo discovers that the man who became Another Ex-Aid is attacking small children because his own son has reached a critical stage of an illness and is in need of a heart transplant: their organs are of similar physical size. Emu admits he is trying to give the child hope by bringing his father back, but the father pushes them both away. Recognizing Sougo's desire to help others, Emu gives him the Ex-Aid Ride Watch and journeys to 2016 to join Geiz and Kamen Rider Ex-Aid in battling Another Ex-Aid. When Emu loses his Rider Powers due to the presence of the Another Rider, Sougo equips Ex-Aid Armor and swiftly destroys the evil Rider. Sougo then tells Emu of the ill son, and because the disease is in an earlier stage he can be healed. Back in 2018, Sougo explains to Geiz and Tsukuyomi that as long as he has them to guide him, he won't become Ohma Zi-O, but instructs them to kill him the moment they both believe he will.: This episode is a tribute to Kamen Rider Ex-Aid as it continues the events of episode 3.
5	"Switch On! 2011"; Transliteration: "Suitchi On! Nisen-jū-ichi" (Japanese: スイッチオン！2011)	Koichi Sakamoto	Kento Shimoyama	September 30, 2018
While investigating a string of mysterious disappearances at Amanogawa High School: over a number of years several girls have disappeared with the only common link being that they are aged 18 and are Libras. Whilst undercover at the school, Sougo encounters Woz again, who gives him the cryptic clue 'It all started with a shooting star'. When looking for Karin Yamabuki, the girl they believe to be the next target, they instead encounter an Another Rider: Another Fourze. Sougo and Geiz transform to fight it but before they can destroy it, it flees. Sougo and Geiz then learn the fight was observed by the high school's Kamen Rider Club. The Clubs faculty advisor gives Sougo a gift: the Fourze Ride Watch. Discovering that the first 4 girls disappeared in 2011 (the year Another Fourze was created), the two Riders journey back in time whilst Tsukuyomi goes in search of Karin. In 2011, Sougo equips the Fourze Armor and successfully defeats Another Fourze, but the enemy morphs into a second Another Rider, Another Faiz.: This episode is a shared tribute to Kamen Rider Fourze and Kamen Rider 555.
6	"555・913・2003"; Transliteration: "Faizu Kaiza Nisen-san" (Japanese: 555・913・2003)	Koichi Sakamoto	Kento Shimoyama	October 7, 2018
Another Faiz regains the Another Fourze power and flees. Returning to 2018, Sougo learns that Tsukuyomi was interrupted finding Karin by two men: Kusaka Masato and Takumi Inui. Takumi explains he is trying to stop Kusaka from hurting Karin, but he doesn't know why he is targeting Karin. Whilst Sougo and Takumi observe Karin, Tsukuyomi and Geiz discover more girls had disappeared before 2011, but when they find photos of Karin looking exactly the same years apart, they start to question whether she is truly innocent. All forces converge when Karin tries to stop Another Fourze from kidnapping another girl. The Riders learn that Karin died in 2003 in a traffic accident whilst waiting for her friend Sakuma to watch a meteor shower. Sakuma is then given the power of Another Faiz which lets him transfer life energy from the kidnapped girls to Karin to keep her alive before being given Another Fourze's powers in 2011 to continue. The rider powers are locked in a cycle of regeneration, which is why he recovered after his defeat. Kusaka was trying to stop Sakuma at Karin's request as they are all old friends. Takumi then presents the Faiz Ride Watch, which Sougo gives to Geiz to use in 2003. By using the Faiz and Fourze Ride Watches, Geiz and Sougo are able to destroy Sakuma's powers, restoring history and allowing Karin to rest in peace.: This episode is a shared tribute to Kamen Rider Fourze and Kamen Rider 555 as it continues the events of episode 5.
7	"Magic Showtime 2018"; Transliteration: "Majikku Shōtaimu Nisen-jū-hachi" (Japanese: マジック・ショータイム2018)	Satoshi Morota	Kento Shimoyama	October 14, 2018
Sougo and company learn about a suspicious magic show, where the illusionist Hayase's tricks are far too real to be stage magic, and investigate to see if an Another Rider is involved. They learn that in 2012, Hayase gained the power of Another Wizard and moved from back-stage hand to performer to keep the theatre owned by his friend Kaori from closing. Now in 2018, the theater is closing again, and this time Kaori has also accepted the long-time proposals from Hayase's coworker Nagasawa. Geiz searches for Hayase but becomes aware he is being followed by a mysterious man with 2 Ride Watches. Finding Hayase attacking Nagasawa after learning of Kaoris acceptance, Geiz and Zi-O battle Another Wizard. Tsukuyomi is hit by a sleep-spell and the distraction allows Hayase to flee.: This episode is a tribute to Kamen Rider Wizard.
8	"Beauty & Beast 2012"; Transliteration: "Byūti Ando Bīsuto Nisen-jū-ni" (Japanese: ビューティ＆ビースト2012)	Satoshi Morota	Kento Shimoyama	October 21, 2018
Tsukuyomi falls victim to Another Wizard's powers and Geiz, blaming Sougo for what happened to her, departs to confront the enemy alone. Sougo begins to question Hayase's original motives for gaining the power after saving Kaori from an enraged Another Wizard, whilst Geiz tracks the man with the Ride Watches, Kosuke Nito, who refuses to give them up until he remembers why he has them. Sougo asks Woz for guidance, who explains that Another Riders corrupt written history when they exist. Remembering how Sento and Emu regained their memories for brief moments, Geiz locates Nito in a park whilst Sougo finds Hayase and temporarily defeats him, after which Hayase reveals that he has been in love with Kaori for years, and took the powers in 2012 to keep the theatre open for her, but regrets not having the strength to be honest. During the window of defeat, Nito transforms into Kamen Rider Beast and suddenly attacks Geiz, before suddenly stopping, apologising and giving him the Wizard Ride Watch but keeping the Beast Ride Watch. Geiz travels back to 2012 and uses the Wizard Armor to defeat Hayase. Using the time-crossing abilities of the Faiz Phone-X, Sougo allows the future Hayase to give his younger self words of encouragement to admit his feelings to Kaori.: This episode is a tribute to Kamen Rider Wizard as it continues the events of episode 7.
9	"Genm Master 2016"; Transliteration: "Genmu Masutā Nisen-jū-roku" (Japanese: ゲンムマスター2016)	Takayuki Shibasaki	Nobuhiro Mouri	October 28, 2018
Kuroto Dan establishes his own nation, declaring independence from Japan and calling himself King Kuroto Dan. While investigating him, Sougo and Geiz discover that the Time Jackers are involved as Kuroto has become Another OOO and is converting anyone who defies him into Yummys subserviant to him. During a fight, Kuroto drops the Gemn Ride Watch which Geiz and Tsukuyomi take to 2016 to defeat Another OOO, whilst Sougo in the present ingratiates himself into Kurotos staff by stating his wish to learn from the king. When the Gemn Ride Watch fails to destroy Another OOO in 2016, Tsukuyomi realises that they have the wrong power and year, so return to 2018, where in reaction to Sougo working for King Kuroto, Geiz declares his intent to kill him, but is utterly defeated with ease by Zi-O.: This episode is a shared tribute to Kamen Rider Ex-Aid and Kamen Rider OOO.
10	"Hawk, Tiger, and Grasshopper 2010"; Transliteration: "Taka to Tora to Batta Nisen-jū" (Japanese: タカとトラとバッタ2010)	Takayuki Shibasaki	Nobuhiro Mouri	November 11, 2018
Sougo becomes Kuroto's subordinate and Geiz starts believing that he is indeed following the path to become the tyrant Ohma Zi-O, vowing to destroy him in their next encounter. Geiz and Sougo then fight again, but Geiz is confused when Sougo breaks off to defeat Waste Yummys attacking workers. Sougo explains that he knows Kuroto is evil: in order for Sougo to become a good king, he needs to learn what a bad king would to in order to avoid those actions, hence why he joined Kuroto. Two prisoners in Kuroto's dungeon: guardswomen Hina Izumi and captive Diet Member Eiji Hino try to escape but are stopped by Sougo and Kuroto. Sougo then questions Kuroto's right to be king since he doesn't care for his subjects, then helps Eiji and Hina escape, who give him the OOO TaToBa and TaJaDol Ride Watches as thanks, along with the advice that he can't do everything himself. After a brief skirmish in the Time Majin where Sougo uses the two new Ride Watches to upgrade its power, he travels back to 2010 and uses the OOO Armor to defeat Another OOO just after it was created. Sougo returns home to find that Geiz has moved out, having realized that by befriending Sougo, he allowed himself to question his mission to save the future by destroying Ohma Zi-O.: This episode is a shared tribute to Kamen Rider Ex-Aid and Kamen Rider OOO as it continues the events of episode 9.
11	"Zi-O on Parade 2018"; Transliteration: "Jiō On Parēdo Nisen-jū-hachi" (Japanese: ジオウ・オン・パレード2018)	Kazuya Kamihoriuchi	Nobuhiro Mouri	November 18, 2018
Zi-O successfully defeats the evil Another Gaim, but is then told by a Divine Entity that he needs to find another way. 3 days earlier, Sougo and co. investigate the mysterious disappearances of popular dance team members, whilst Geiz considers joining the Time Jackers who share the goal of removing Ohma Zi-O. They soon learn that dance team Baron leader Asura is Another Gaim, and is sending anyone who challenges him to a dark dimension called Helheim Forest. To make matters worse, Geiz is sent to Helheim during a battle after refusing to join the Time Jackers. In Helheim Forest Geiz meets Kaito Kumon, the original Team Baron leader who has spent 5 years trapped in Helheim after Asura, who Kaito had just kicked from the group, used the Another Rider powers and seized control. Sougo then battles Another Gaim when to everyones confusion, including Woz and Tsukuyomi, a second Zi-O appears and joins the fight, but stops Sougo before he can finish the Another Rider, resulting in their defeat. In the aftermath as Another Gaim flees, Sougo, Tsukuyomi and Woz meet another Sougo.: This episode is a tribute to Kamen Rider Gaim.
12	"My × My Stage 2013"; Transliteration: "Ore Ore no Sutēji Nisen-jū-san" (Japanese: オレ×オレのステージ2013)	Kazuya Kamihoriuchi	Nobuhiro Mouri	November 25, 2018
The second Sougo explains his encounter with the Divine Entity, who told him that he needs to learn to trust and work with others to achieve great things, and was sent him back in time 3 days so he could find a way to save Geiz. Realizing that she has spent the day unknowingly with both Sougos switching places, Tsukuyomi and Woz are very angry with the present Sougo, who is understandably upset and nearly cries as technically he hasn't done anything wrong. Future Sougo explains that he needs his present selfs help to rescue Geiz, which Woz believes is a waste of time, and sends his past self to find the Gaim Ride Watch. Swartz is annoyed that Asura, now outed as a monster and having lost fame and fandom, has no interest in becoming King, before being approached by Woz. As Sougo is given the Gaim Ride Watch and Kodoma Suika Arms, Asura attacks him as revenge for ousting him, before Swartz sends both of Sougos newly acquired watches into Helheim. Future Sougo admits this was his plan, as Geiz needs them to escape. Heeding Kaitos advice to have the resolve to change fate, Geiz is able to escape using the Gaim Watch, which signals Future Sougo to travel back to 2013 as both Zi-Os use Gaim Armor to destroy Another Gaim. All the people sent to Helheim are returned, Kaito takes back control of Team Baron and sends Asura away, saying that if he can't make it as a pro dancer using his own strength, then he has no place among any of the Beat Rider dance groups, and Geiz moves back in. Meanwhile, Woz is angry that Sougo nearly broke time by creating a paradox and that Geiz is now appearing in the written history of Ohma Zi-O's rise, which he wasn't before indicating history is starting to change.: This episode is a tribute to Kamen Rider Gaim as it continues the events of episode 11, as well as leads up to the events of Kamen Rider Heisei Generations Forever.
13	"Ghost Hunter 2018"; Transliteration: "Gōsuto Hantā Nisen-jū-hachi" (Japanese: ゴーストハンター2018)	Satoshi Morota	Nobuhiro Mouri	December 2, 2018
Geiz returns home redetermined to kill Sougo as soon as possible, and during breakfast at Sougo's asking, Tsukuyomi reveals that the Ghost and Drive Ride Watches Geiz possesses are stolen from Ohma Zi-O in 2068. Woz, seeking to return written history to its proper course after Sougo's meddling with time, joins forces with the Time Jackers and gives them advice on their next move. Meanwhile, a new Another Rider that is taking people's souls is being chased by members of a paranormal investigation group including Takeru Tenkuji, and soon Sougo and Geiz are facing off against Another Ghost. Their battle is interrupted by the arrival of a figure who Geiz recognises as Kamen Rider Agito, before it changes to Kamen Rider Hibiki to defeat Sougo. Woz reveals he gave the Time Jackers instructions to create Another Ghost to manipulate history to lure Geiz into getting attacked by Kamen Rider Decade. Takeru then uses a technique to stop Sougo's disembodied soul form being absorbed by Another Ghost, but it results in Sougo essentially becoming a spirit that only Takeru can see. Ora later offers to make Tsukasa into a king, but he says he has no interest in being one as he examines the Decade Ride Watch.: This episode is a shared tribute to Kamen Rider Decade and Kamen Rider Ghost, as well as takes place after the events of Kamen Rider Heisei Generations Forever.
14	"Go! Go! Ghost 2015"; Transliteration: "Gō! Gō! Gōsuto Nisen-jū-go" (Japanese: GO！GO！ゴースト2015)	Satoshi Morota	Nobuhiro Mouri	December 9, 2018
Sougo has become a ghost, and in order to return him to normal Another Ghost must be defeated. Unfortunately the man behind the power, Makimura, was fatally injured saving his younger sister Mika from falling steel beams and was given the power seconds before being killed, so defeating him would mean killing the man. As Geiz tries to defeat Another Ghost, Kamen Rider Decade appears to stop him using his own Ghost power. Geiz is defeated and Tsukasa nullifies the power of Geiz's Ghost Watch before leaving the Decade Ride Watch behind as compensation. Meanwhile under Sougo's guidance, Takeru takes the Time Majin back to 2015 to avert the accident that killed Makimura. When the Time Jackers arrive, Takeru remembers he is a rider and transforms with Makoto into Kamen Riders Ghost and Specter respectively. Whilst he is unable to prevent Makimura from becoming Another Ghost, he does prevent his life-threatening injuries, and returns to 2018. Sougo, still disembodied, is made visible using the Reveal Fire and Takeru gives him the Ghost Ride Watch in his possession. Sougo then transforms into Zi-O Decade Armor, and using the Build and Ghost Ride Watches to further enhance his powers, is able to defeat Another Ghost safe in the knowledge Makimura would be saved too. Sougo's spirit is returned to his body, but he comes home to find Tsukasa Kadoya, who introduces himself as the man who will destroy the world, but Woz reveals that with Tsukasa's arrival, history will start to accelerate, which was his plan all along.: This episode is a shared tribute to Kamen Rider Decade and Kamen Rider Ghost as it continues the events of episode 13.
15	"Back to 2068"; Transliteration: "Bakku Tu Nisen-rokujū-hachi" (Japanese: バック・トゥ・2068)	Ryuta Tasaki	Nobuhiro Mouri	December 16, 2018
Sougo reveals the reason he feels he must become King is that he has spent many years as a child plagued by a dream: a world being destroyed by giant robots, which Sougo vowed he would never let happen. Geiz then says that if Sougo gives up his Ziku-Driver, he wouldn't be able to transform and would avoid becoming Ohma Zi-O entirely. When the machines from his dream: Ohma Zi-O's forces are sent from the future to attack, Geiz decides to kill Sougo. However, Decade intervenes and sends Sougo and Tsukuyomi 50 years into the future, where he has an encounter with Ohma Zi-O himself. Sougo is horrified by the devastation he sees around him, and refuses to believe that he could ever become as cruel as Ohma Zi-O is, until Ohma Zi-O recounts the dream in perfect detail, proving that he is Sougo's future, fated self. Sougo transforms and tries to defeat him, but he is powerless before the immemse might of Ohma Zi-O, who tells his younger self that the only way to defeat him is to destroy his belt and give up being a rider.: This episode is a tribute to Kamen Rider Decade as it continues the events of episode 14.
16	"Forever King 2018"; Transliteration: "Fōebā Kingu Nisen-jū-hachi" (Japanese: フォーエバー・キング2018)	Ryuta Tasaki	Nobuhiro Mouri	December 23, 2018
Stunned by the revelation that he is Ohma Zi-O, Sougo returns to 2018 and throws away his Ziku-Driver to ensure that Ohma Zi-O never appears. When Geiz destroys the belt, all of Ohma Zi-O's forces in this time disappear, and Geiz and Tsukuyomi decide to return to 2068, as their mission is complete. However, one of the Assassins was saved by the Time Jackers, who repurpose it to kill Sougo in order to prevent him from interfering. Sougo then tries to run from Woz who has come with a new Driver for him. Geiz and Tsukuyomi come to help, but are stunned when Sougo does not dodge a powerful attack, until they realise he was protecting a small boy. Geiz then transforms to fight, only for Tsukasa Kadoya to interfere and fight against him to amuse himself. Outmatched, Geiz forces to make a fateful decision: become a Kamen Rider again. Sougo refuses to risk becoming evil until Geiz promises to help guide him, and to stop him if he does. Accepting and swearing his fate to become the demon king who will save the world, Sougo transforms into Zi-O and using Decade and Ex-Aids power, forces Tsukasa to pull back and destroys the Assassin. Unbeknown to them, Sougo's newfound determination has already affected history, as a new Kamen Rider appears.: This episode is a tribute to Kamen Rider Decade as it continues the events of episode 15.
17	"Happy New Woz 2019"; Transliteration: "Happī Nyū Wozu Nisen-jū-kyū" (Japanese: ハッピーニューウォズ2019)	Takayuki Shibasaki	Kento Shimoyama	January 6, 2019
Sougo has a dream where he is in 2022 and encounters the ninja-themed Kamen Rider Shinobi, before awakening back in 2019. Hearing of his dream, Geiz explains about Ohma Day: not too far into Sougo's current future, he will gain the power of Ohma Zi-O, and no Kamen Riders will be born after this day. When Sougo and Geiz challenge a new Another Rider who bears a remarkable similarity to the rider in Sougo's dream, there is confusion as Woz does not recognise him and events are happening that do not match what is written in his book. The Another Rider is also seen being observed by Woz wearing different clothes, and now possessing a tablet capable of manipulating the immediate future. The Another Rider, identified as Another Shinobi is revealed to be Rentaro Kagura, the man Sougo saw become Kamen Rider Shinobi in his dream. Things are further confused when a second Woz arrives on the battlefield and uses the BeyonDriver to transform into Kamen Rider Woz, and swiftly defeats Another Shinobi. Sougo and the others learn that Sougo's decision to remain Zi-O created a second future, one where Kamen Riders continue to exist because on Ohma Day, Geiz is able to destroy Ohma Zi-O. Now these 2 distinct futures fighting for dominance: one where Sougo becomes Ohma Zi-O and enslaves the world, and one where Geiz defeats Ohma Zi-O and becomes the ultimate savior: Geiz Revive.
18	"Amazing! Era! Future! 2022"; Transliteration: "Sugoi! Jidai! Mirai! Nisen-nijū-ni" (Japanese: スゴイ！ジダイ！ミライ！2022)	Takayuki Shibasaki	Kento Shimoyama	January 13, 2019
Swartz allows Another Shinobi to flee. Sougo and co. are in shock as Ohma Day has now become a focal turning point in history leading to 2 distinct futures: One where Sougo becomes Ohma Zi-O, and another where Geiz becomes the Savior of Humanity: Geiz Revive and destroys him, along with there now being 2 Woz's, each loyal to a different master. To distinguish between them, they decide to rename them based on their wardrobe, calling the original Black Woz and the one from the other future White Woz. They also face the dilemma that Another Shinobi and Kamen Rider Shinobi are the same person, meaning they can't obtain the Ride Watch necessary to beat him, until the white-colored Woz comes up with a plan.
19	"The Quiz Shock 2040"; Transliteration: "Za Kuizu Shokku Nisen-yonjū" (Japanese: ザ・クイズショック2040)	Satoshi Morota	Kento Shimoyama	January 20, 2019
From the alternate timeline, another Kamen Rider from the future, Kamen Rider Quiz appears, and Sougo and Geiz must team up with him to defeat a new Another Rider. But Sougo and Geiz are confronted by Black and White Woz respectively, each of them wanting the Kamen Rider he supports to strip the other of his power.
20	"Final Answer? 2040"; Transliteration: "Fainaru Ansā? Nisen-yonjū" (Japanese: ファイナルアンサー？2040)	Satoshi Morota	Kento Shimoyama	January 27, 2019
To save his father, who was transformed into Another Quiz, Kamen Rider Quiz must ally with the other Kamen Riders, but not before dealing with another problem. White Woz affirms to Geiz that he is here to ensure that his version of history survives: the power of 3 future Kamen Riders will unlock Geiz Revive, who will destroy Ohma Zi-O.
21	"Mirror World 2019"; Transliteration: "Mirā Wārudo Nisen-jū-kyū" (Japanese: ミラーワールド2019)	Ryuta Tasaki	Kento Shimoyama	February 3, 2019
Sougo and Geiz face a new Another Rider who can reflect all attacks against it with two times the power, and their investigation leads them to meet Daisuke Okubo, chief editor of the ORE Journal.: This episode is a tribute to Kamen Rider Ryuki: Episode Final.
22	"Zi-O Strongest! 2019"; Transliteration: "Jiō Saikyoū! Nisen-jū-kyū" (Japanese: ジオウサイキョウー！2019)	Ryuta Tasaki	Kento Shimoyama	February 10, 2019
Sougo confronts a mirror version of himself while Geiz looks for a way to destroy Another Ryuga and rescue him from the Mirror World.: This episode is a tribute to Kamen Rider Ryuki: Episode Final as it continues the events of episode 21.
23	"It is Kikai! 2121"; Transliteration: "Kikai dā! Nisen-hyaku-nijū-ichi" (Japanese: キカイだー！2121)	Kyohei Yamaguchi	Kento Shimoyama	February 17, 2019
Sougo studies hard to ensure his graduation and meets a new Kamen Rider, who comes from a distant future. Together, they must fight one of the Time Jackers, who was transformed into an Another Rider by his companions.
24	"Best Friend 2121"; Transliteration: "Besuto Furendo Nisen-hyaku-nijū-ichi" (Japanese: ベスト・フレンド2121)	Kyohei Yamaguchi	Kento Shimoyama	February 24, 2019
Sougo fights the brainwashed Kamen Rider Kikai, while one of the Time Jackers approaches Geiz and the others with a proposal to help defeat Another Kikai.
25	"Another Zi-O 2019"; Transliteration: "Anazā Jiō Nisen-jū-kyū" (Japanese: アナザージオウ2019)	Satoshi Morota	Kento Shimoyama	March 3, 2019
The defeated Another Riders begin reappearing and attacking the people they manifested from. Sougo investigates, but encounters a new enemy in the form of a vaguely familiar face who is masterminding the Another Riders' attacks and can transform into an Another Rider with similar powers to Zi-O.
26	"GeizRevive! 2019"; Transliteration: "GeitsuRibaibu! Nisen-jū-kyū" (Japanese: ゲイツリバイブ！2019)	Satoshi Morota	Kento Shimoyama	March 10, 2019
Tsukuyomi travels to the past to discover the connection between Sougo and Another Zi-O, while Geiz decides to finally put the new power he gained from White Woz to good use.
27	"Where It All Began 2009"; Transliteration: "Subete no Hajimari Nisen-kyū" (Japanese: すべてのはじまり2009)	Ryuta Tasaki	Kento Shimoyama	March 17, 2019
Geiz reaffirms his intention to stop Sougo from becoming Ohma Zi-O, but Black Woz allies himself with Heure to intervene in the fight between the two Kamen Riders.: This episode is a tribute to Kamen Rider Decade.
28	"Our Goal 2019"; Transliteration: "Ore-tachi no Gōru Nisen-jū-kyū" (Japanese: オレたちのゴール2019)	Ryuta Tasaki	Kento Shimoyama	March 24, 2019
Hiryū and Black Woz, as Kamen Rider Woz, confront Sougo and Geiz, respectively. The two riders however, are determined to overcome all obstacles and confront each other in their destined fight.: This episode is a tribute to Kamen Rider Decade as it continues the events of episode 27.
29	"Blade Joker!? 2019"; Transliteration: "Bureido Jōkā!? Nisen-jū-kyū" (Japanese: ブレイド・ジョーカー!?2019)	Kyohei Yamaguchi	Kento Shimoyama	March 31, 2019
Though Sougo made peace with Geiz and Tsukuyomi, they have little time to celebrate as the appearance of Kamen Rider Diend and an Another Rider results in the reunion of two opposing Kamen Riders who parted ways after an epic battle between them fourteen years ago.: This episode is a shared tribute to Kamen Rider Blade and Kamen Rider Decade.
30	"2019: Trinity Has Begun!"; Transliteration: "Nisen-jū-kyū: Toriniti Hajimemashita!" (Japanese: 2019：トリニティはじめました！)	Kyohei Yamaguchi	Kento Shimoyama	April 7, 2019
With the forced battle between Kamen Riders Blade and Chalice threatening all life on Earth, White Woz appears before Geiz with the Zi-O Ride Watch II, the Geiz Revive Ride Watch, and a solution to this crisis.: This episode is a shared tribute to Kamen Rider Blade and Kamen Rider Decade as it continues the events of episode 29.
31	"2001: Awaken, the Agito!"; Transliteration: "Nisen-ichi: Mezamero, Sono Agito!" (Japanese: 2001：めざめろ、そのアギト！)	Teruaki Sugihara	Nobuhiro Mouri	April 14, 2019
Sougo and the gang attempt to contact Shoichi Tsugami for his help in restoring Tsukuyomi's lost memories, only to help SAUL fight the Time Jackers' version of Another Agito who is turning his victims into an army of Another Agitos.: This episode is a tribute to Kamen Rider Agito.
32	"2001: Unknown Memories"; Transliteration: "Nisen-ichi: An'nōn na Kioku" (Japanese: 2001：アンノウンなキオク)	Teruaki Sugihara	Nobuhiro Mouri	April 21, 2019
As the G3 army prepare while the Another Agito army grow in strength, the Time Riders find Shoichi with Heure as the Time Jacker uses him to empower the prime Another Agito. When Sougo's group faces a stronger Another Agito to restore his victims to normal, Tsukuyomi appears to unlock a mysterious power hidden within herself.: This episode is a tribute to Kamen Rider Agito as it continues the events of episode 31.
33	"2005: Rejoice! Echo! Roar!"; Transliteration: "Nisen-go: Iwae! Hibike! Todoroke!" (Japanese: 2005：いわえ！ひびけ！とどろけ！)	Satoshi Morota	Nobuhiro Mouri	April 28, 2019
Woz struggles to figure out how to properly celebrate Sougo's upcoming birthday as Another Hibiki attacks with Todoroki and the current holder of the Hibiki title dealing with the Another Rider themselves.: This episode is a tribute to Kamen Rider Hibiki and the last episode of the Kamen Rider Series to air in the Heisei Period.
34	"2019: Heisei's Oni, Reiwa's Oni"; Transliteration: "Nisen-jū-kyū: Heisei no Oni, Reiwa no Oni" (Japanese: 2019：ヘイセイのオニ、レイワのオニ)	Satoshi Morota	Nobuhiro Mouri	May 5, 2019
As Sougo's birthday arrives, he approaches Kyosuke Kiriya for Kamen Rider Hibiki's powers, but the latter reveals that he had never truly surpassed his teacher.: This episode is a tribute to Kamen Rider Hibiki as it continues the events of episode 33 and the first episode of the Kamen Rider Series to air in the Reiwa Period.
35	"2008: First Love, Wake Up!"; Transliteration: "Nisen-hachi: Hatsukoi, Weiku Appu!" (Japanese: 2008：ハツコイ、ウェイクアップ！)	Naoki Tamura	Toshiki Inoue	May 12, 2019
A lawyer visiting Kujigojidō is attacked by Another Kiva, Sougo's childhood crush who seeks to become "queen" of the world. Just then, a new enemy named Kamen Rider Ginga enters the fray to destroy the world.: This episode is a tribute to Kamen Rider Kiva.
36	"2019: First Love, Finaly!"; Transliteration: "Nisen-jū-kyū: Hatsukoi, Fainarī!" (Japanese: 2019：ハツコイ、ファイナリー！)	Naoki Tamura	Toshiki Inoue	May 19, 2019
Finally aware of who Another Kiva is, Sougo approaches her in an attempt to make amends just as the Time Jackers try to form an alliance with her to stop Kamen Rider Ginga. Meanwhile, Geiz travels to the year 2015 to find out what really happened to Sougo's first love.: This episode is a tribute to Kamen Rider Kiva as it continues the events of episode 35.
37	"2006: Next Level Kabuto"; Transliteration: "Nisen-roku: Nekusuto Reberu Kabuto" (Japanese: 2006：ネクスト・レベル・カブト)	Kyohei Yamaguchi	Nobuhiro Mouri	May 26, 2019
Meteorites starting falling all over the city, releasing Worms that start attacking; with Sou Yaguruma leading them as the Another Rider Another Kabuto. To combat them, the Time Riders search for Kamen Rider Gatack while Tsukasa returns with the revelation that Tsukuyomi is connected to the crisis.: This episode is a shared tribute to Kamen Rider Kabuto and Kamen Rider Decade.
38	"2019: The One Chosen by Kabuto"; Transliteration: "Nisen-jū-kyū: Kabuto ni Erabareshi Mono" (Japanese: 2019：カブトにえらばれしもの)	Kyohei Yamaguchi	Nobuhiro Mouri	June 2, 2019
After destroying the meteorite, the Time Riders learn that an even larger one is on the way with Sougo and Woz attempting to destroy it despite Another Kabuto's attempts to stop them. Meanwhile, Tsukasa leads Tsukuyomi to a strange house so she can learn a shocking truth.: This episode is a shared tribute to Kamen Rider Kabuto and Kamen Rider Decade as it continues the events of episode 37.
39	"2007: DenLiner Crash!"; Transliteration: "Nisen-nana: Denrainā Kurasshu!" (Japanese: 2007：デンライナー・クラッシュ！)	Takayuki Shibasaki	Nobuhiro Mouri	June 9, 2019
As Kujigojidō receives a surprise visit from the Taros Imagin when they need Junichirō Tokiwa to repair the DenLiner, the Time Riders find themselves dealing with Kamen Rider Zeronos and a new Another Den-O.: This episode is a tribute to Kamen Rider Den-O.
40	"2017: Grand Climax!"; Transliteration: "Nisen-jū-nana: Gurando Kuraimakkusu!" (Japanese: 2017：グランド・クライマックス！)	Takayuki Shibasaki	Nobuhiro Mouri	June 23, 2019
Sougo acquires the Grand Zi-O Ride Watch, but it disappears when Yuto explains Sougo's destiny, causing a frightened Momotaros to snatch back the Den-O Ride Watch. While Tsukuyomi and Sougo learn more about Another Den-O, Geiz, Woz, and Momotaros head to 2017 to stop him. Sougo also heads to 2017 and passes a message to Takuya about the truth concerning his sister and Yukihiro. With that, Momotaros willingly hands Sougo back the Den-O Ride Watch just as Another Den-O and the Mole Imagin backed up by alternate versions of the latter resume their attack. With the reappearing Grand Zi-O Ride Watch in hand, Sougo transforms into Grand Zi-O and defeats the Mole Imagins and Another Den-O with assistance from Momotaros, Yuto and Deneb. Afterwards, Takuya and Yukihiro reconcile while Sougo ends up having another encounter with Ohma Zi-O.: This episode is a tribute to Kamen Rider Den-O as it continues the events of episode 39.
41	"2019: World, Reset"; Transliteration: "Nisen-jū-kyū: Sekai, Risetto" (Japanese: 2019：セカイ、リセット)	Satoshi Morota	Nobuhiro Mouri	June 30, 2019
Sougo and Ohma Zi-O have their climatic rematch when a temporal distortion returns the former to 2019. There, Sougo finds his timeline has been greatly altered with his granduncle not knowing who he is, Geiz and Tsukuyomi seeing him as their enemy again, and Woz now serving Hiryū who has taken over Ohma Zi-O's place as the tyrant king Another Zi-O II.: This episode is a tribute to Kamen Rider Decade.
42	"2019: Missing World"; Transliteration: "Nisen-jū-kyū: Misshingu Wārudo" (Japanese: 2019：ミッシング・ワールド)	Satoshi Morota	Nobuhiro Mouri	July 7, 2019
Geiz attacks Sougo, even in spite of the latter's refusal to fight his friend. Just then, Tsukasa returns to seemingly aid them. Meanwhile, Daiki Kaito approaches Hiryū and Woz to claim their "treasure".: This episode is a tribute to Kamen Rider Decade as it continues the events of episode 41.
43	"2019: Tsukuyomi Confidential"; Transliteration: "Nisen-jū-kyū: Tsukuyomi Konfidensharu" (Japanese: 2019：ツクヨミ・コンフィデンシャル)	Satoshi Morota	Nobuhiro Mouri	July 14, 2019
With Tsukuyomi captured, Schwarz begins to reveal the story behind her amnesia as well as his plan, which sends Heure and Ora running; forcing them to seek out the Time Riders as they and Tsukasa join forces to confront Another Zi-O II and his army of Another Riders in an epic showdown.: This episode is a tribute to Kamen Rider Decade as it continues the events of episode 42. It also leads up to the alternate events depicted in Kamen Rider Zi-O the Movie: Over Quartzer.
44	"2019: The Call of Aqua"; Transliteration: "Nisen-jū-kyū: Aqua no Yobigoe" (Japanese: 2019：アクアのよびごえ)	Kyohei Yamaguchi	Kento Shimoyama	July 21, 2019
As the Time Riders investigate the disappearance of a former classmate of Sougo's, they encounter Michal Minato/Kamen Rider Aqua, who has come from 2050 to take Tsukuyomi and Geiz back to their time for unknown reasons. However, while fighting Another Drive, the group are confronted by Swartz, who reveals his new power as Another Decade while he's gathering the Another Riders' power for himself.: This episode is a shared tribute to Kamen Rider × Kamen Rider Fourze & OOO: Movie War Mega Max, Kamen Rider Drive and Kamen Rider Decade.
45	"2019: Eternal Party"; Transliteration: "Nisen-jū-kyū: Etānaru Pāti" (Japanese: 2019：エターナル・パーティ)	Kyohei Yamaguchi	Kento Shimoyama	July 28, 2019
With Another Drive's identity supposedly revealed, Geiz argues with Sougo over both trusting Heure and Ora while questioning if he has any right to remain in the present. Meanwhile, Swartz recruits Kamen Rider Eternal to his side after spiriting Sougo's former classmate Owada away.: This episode is a shared tribute to Kamen Rider W Forever: A to Z/The Gaia Memories of Fate, Kamen Rider × Kamen Rider Fourze & OOO: Movie War Mega Max, Kamen Rider Drive and Kamen Rider Decade as it continues the events of episode 44.
46	"2019: Operation Woz"; Transliteration: "Nisen-jū-kyū: Operēshon Wozu" (Japanese: 2019：オペレーション・ウォズ)	Kyohei Yamaguchi	Kento Shimoyama	August 4, 2019
Geiz becomes trapped in Swartz's Another World, with a revived White Woz taking his place to confront Black Woz. Meanwhile, Swartz's plan nears completion, but Michal Minato stands against him with the last of the courage that Kamen Rider OOO gave him.: This episode is a shared tribute to Kamen Rider W Forever: A to Z/The Gaia Memories of Fate, Kamen Rider × Kamen Rider Fourze & OOO: Movie War Mega Max, and Kamen Rider Decade as it continues the events of episode 45.
47	"2019: The Vanishing Watches"; Transliteration: "Nisen-jū-kyū: Kieru Wotchi" (Japanese: 2019：きえるウォッチ)	Takayuki Shibasaki	Kento Shimoyama	August 11, 2019
Strange occurrences happen all over Japan, from a strange wall dividing the country to Sougo's Ride Watches mysteriously losing their power. With Tsukasa's powers, Tsukuyomi takes Sougo to her original timeline to investigate as an army of Roidmudes led by Mashin Chaser stand in their way.: This episode is a shared tribute to Kamen Rider Drive and Kamen Rider Decade.
48	"2068: Ohma Time"; Transliteration: "Nisen-rokujū-hachi: Ōma Taimu" (Japanese: 2068：オーマ・タイム)	Takayuki Shibasaki	Kento Shimoyama	August 18, 2019
As Earth is subjected to a mass convergence with the A.R. Worlds and his friends continue to fight Swartz and the influx of past monsters, Sougo realizes he is the epicenter of the chaos and travels to 2068 to settle things with Ohma Zi-O in a final confrontation.: This episode is a shared tribute to Kamen Rider Drive and Kamen Rider Decade as it continues the events of episode 47.
49 (Finale)	"2019: Apocalypse"; Transliteration: "Nisen-jū-kyū: Apokaripusu" (Japanese: 2019：アポカリプス)	Takayuki Shibasaki	Kento Shimoyama	August 25, 2019
Tsukuyomi becomes Kamen Rider Tsukuyomi, only to betray everyone and advance the A.R World apocalypse. Sougo and company discuss the situation but struggle to find a solution to save Sougo's world. The next day, the Riders, later joined by Sougo as Grand Zi-O, confront Swartz and his monsters, only for Swartz to overpower them all. Swartz attempts to kill Sougo, but Geiz takes the killing blow for him and encourages Sougo to become Ohma Zi-O as he dies. Grieved and enraged, Sougo transforms into Ohma Zi-O and destroys Swartz's legions after Swartz tries and fails to steal his powers. Swartz attempts to flee, but Tsukuyomi backstabs him. Realising Tsukuyomi feigned her loyalty, Swartz angrily kills her, only for an infuriated Sougo to kill him in retaliation. Following the battle's end, Woz congratulates and pledges his loyalty to Ohma Zi-O, but Sougo relinquishes his powers to undo the damage done. In a new world, Sougo is back as a high school student, this time, with Ora, Heure, Tsukuyomi and Geiz as his school friends.: This episode is a tribute to Kamen Rider Decade as it continues the events of episode 48, as well as leads up to the events of Kamen Rider Zi-O Next Time, which served as the true ending.
