= Hazlin Hussain =

Malaysian news presenter

- Born: 16 December 1983 (age 42); Kajang, Selangor, Malaysia
- Education: Bachelor of Banking
- Alma mater: Universiti Utara Malaysia
- Occupations: News anchor, television presenter
- Years active: 2009–present
- Spouse: Mior Abdul Malek Raiyani (m. 2015)
- Parents: Halimah Mohd Din (mother); Hussain Yusof (father)

Hazlin Hussain (born 16 December 1983) is former a Malaysian television presenter and news anchor. She began her broadcasting career by becoming one of the participants Gadis Melayu program for the second season in TV9, she subsequently joined TV3 as a news presenter.

== Personal life ==
Hazlin was born on 16 December 1983 and raised in Kajang, Selangor and holds a Bachelor of Banking degree at Universiti Utara Malaysia (UUM) in Sintok, Kedah. She married her TV3 colleague Mior Abdul Malek Raiyani on 15 December 2015. She started wearing her hijab on 25 February 2014.

On 23 September 2023 Hazlin continue study in National of University Malaysia, Bangi for take degree Islamic Studies after retirement brocast.

== Career ==
Hazlin began her broadcasting career after being a finalist in talent search program Gadis Melayu (Malay Girl) of TV9 for the second season. After the end of Gadis Melayu, Hazlin registered herself on TV3 and subsequently served as a presenter of Buletin Utama, Buletin 1:30 and Buletin Pagi. She is best known as the host for 999 criminal investigative reality series for whom she replaced Zakiah Anas who quit TV3 in 2014. Through this show, she was known for her slogan "Ingat, jenayah membawa padah!" (Remember, crime have consequences!) at the end of the show. In addition, she also runs the Malaysian morning talk program Malaysia Hari Ini.

== Filmography ==
=== Television ===
- Gadis Melayu (season 2; TV9)
- Malaysia Hari Ini (TV3)
- Buletin Utama (TV3)
- 999 (TV3)
- Buletin 1:30 (TV3)
- Buletin Pagi (TV3)
- Berita TV9 (TV9)
- Global TV9 (TV9)
- Buletin Pertiwi (TV Pertiwi)
