= Maple Loo =

Malaysian dancer and choreographer

Maple Loo (born September 3, 1973 in Kuala Lumpur, Malaysia) is a Malaysian dancer, choreographer, actress, singer, model, fitness advocate and businesswoman. She has an MBA degree from Edith Cowan University, Australia.

She spent her early career as a dancer and choreographer for many Malaysian stars including Siti Nurhaliza, Anuar Zain, Amy Mastura, Sarimah Ibrahim, Too Phat, Erra Fazira, Fauziah Latiff, Ning Baizura, Syfinaz, Dayang and Adiba Noor. She has also danced in Malaysian award shows Muzik-Muzik, Anugerah Industri Muzik and Anugerah Juara Lagu.

== Career ==
From 2003 to 2011, Maple was Creative and Marketing Director of Samadhi Retreats, a hospitality group with hotels and restaurants in Asia. She currently holds the position of Storyteller within the company.

Maple's professional dance career began when she joined Kit Kat Klub at 21, a dance and modeling company in Kuala Lumpur founded by Malaysian actress Tiara Jacquelina. She went on to work in numerous projects with renowned Malaysian choreographers including Pat Ibrahim, Batt Latiff and Linda Jasmine.

As an actress, Maple appeared in local TV series, Spanar Jaya as Rambo's love interest "Jessie" and Pi Mai Pi Mai Tang Tu as a guest star for a Hari Raya episode.

She has also appeared in TV commercials for Celcom Broadband, Sony Truvox and Panasonic. Her music video appearances include Too Phat's Jezebel and Sharizan's I'm No King. In the late 1990s, Maple, as part of female group VYBZ was signed by Pony Canyon (Fuji TV, Japan) as a recording artiste and had released a single debut in collaboration with Malaysian boy group KGB.

In 2007, Maple was invited by TV3 to be a judge on live weekly reality singing competition, Gang Starz, in search of the best vocal group in Malaysia.

In 2010, Maple became a judge on 8TV's Showdown 2012 alongside Malaysian rapper and hip-hop artiste Joe Flizzow and deejay Hafiz Hatim. The weekly show ran for 3 seasons and won the Best/Most Popular Dance Show 2010 in Malaysia by Shout Awards and Anugerah Skrin. On the show, Maple gained a reputation as 'the stylish judge' who 'builds and not beats down' crews with her advice and criticism.

== Pole dancer ==
In the same year that 8TV Showdown started, Maple introduced Bobbi's Pole Studio, an Australian pole dancing school that was awarded Pole Dance Studio of the Year 2009 and 2010 by the International Pole Dance Fitness Association, to Malaysia by opening a studio in Kuala Lumpur. She is Chief Instructor and owner of Bobbi's Pole Studio Malaysia. As a pole dancer, she has trained and performed in Australia and Singapore.

In 2014, Maple performed alongside Felix Cane, 2-time World Pole Dance Champion and Raha Star at the Adidas Originals Ultimate "This Is Me" 2014 Party in Shanghai, China, in conjunction with the brand's flagship store opening in Shanghai.

== Animal rights activist ==
Maple is a keen animal rights activist

In 2007, she became a Tiger Ambassador for MYCAT to raise awareness on the conservation and protection of tigers in Malaysia. The Race Against Time (Tiger Day) campaign was held at Malaysia's National Zoo (Zoo Negara) on 16 December 2007 where she choreographed and performed with her group of dancers at the event.

She has also been a volunteer at the zoo since 2003 and in the same year created and managed a Public Relations Campaign to raise funds with the Akademi Fantasia Season 1 artistes.

She is a WWF Volunteer for the Sea Turtle Sanctuary in Ma Daerah, Malaysia since 2000.

Maple also worked as a volunteer with Traffic South East Asia (a subsidiary of WWF) on an investigation of the trade of Star Tortoises in Peninsula Malaysia as exotic pets.

== Awards ==
In 2008, Maple was nominated by Malaysian Women's Weekly magazine for the Great Women of Our Time Award for Public Service.

Maple has also been nominated for the Top 40 Under 40 award by Prestige Magazine, Malaysia.

In 2012, Maple was awarded The NewMan Creative Pioneer Awards 2012 for Performing Arts, where she was labeled 'The Princess Of Pole'.

== Personal life ==
Maple is married to restaurateur and hotelier, Federico Asaro, founder and owner of Samadhi.
