= Kamen Rider Zi-O =

Japanese Drama

- Genre: Tokusatsu; Superhero fiction; Crossover fiction; Science fiction; Action-Adventure
- Created by: Shotaro Ishinomori
- Written by: Kento Shimoyama; Nobuhiro Mouri; Toshiki Inoue
- Directed by: Ryuta Tasaki; Shojiro Nakazawa; Koichi Sakamoto; Satoshi Morota; Takayuki Shibasaki; Kazuya Kamihoriuchi; Kyohei Yamaguchi; Naoki Tamura
- Starring: So Okuno; Gaku Oshida; Shieri Ohata; Keisuke Watanabe; Rihito Itagaki; Ayaka Konno; Kentarou Kanesaki; Katsuhisa Namase; Masahiro Inoue; Kimito Totani
- Voices of: Rikiya Koyama
- Narrated by: Keisuke Watanabe; Naohiko Fujino; Rikiya Koyama (Opening)
- Opening theme: "Over "Quartzer"" by Shuta Sueyoshi feat. ISSA
- Composer: Toshihiko Sahashi
- Country of origin: Japan
- Original language: Japanese
- No. of episodes: 49 (list of episodes)

Production
- Executive producer: Motoi Sasaki (TV Asahi)
- Producers: Chihiro Inoue (TV Asahi); Ayumi Kanno (TV Asahi); Shinichiro Shirakura (Toei); Naomi Takebe (Toei)
- Running time: 20–25 minutes
- Production companies: TV Asahi; Toei Company; ADK Emotions (Note: Credited as Asatsu-DK until January 2019.)

Original release
- Network: ANN (TV Asahi)
- Release: September 2, 2018 – August 25, 2019

Related
- Kamen Rider Build; Kamen Rider Zero-One

Kamen Rider Zi-O (仮面ライダージオウ, Kamen Raidā Jiō) is a Japanese tokusatsu drama produced by Toei Company and part of the Kamen Rider franchise. It is the 29th television series in the franchise, and the 20th and final installment of the Heisei period. The series premiered on September 2, 2018, following Kamen Rider Build's conclusion. It aired alongside Kaitou Sentai Lupinranger VS Keisatsu Sentai Patranger and later the miniseries Super Sentai Strongest Battle, before being joined by Kishiryu Sentai Ryusoulger in the Super Hero Time programming block.

The series incorporates a time travel and multiverse motif, serving as a tribute to the preceding Heisei-era Kamen Rider productions and functioning as a spiritual successor to Kamen Rider Decade. The series and its related films also feature returning actors reprising their roles from earlier Heisei entries.

== Plot ==
Sougo Tokiwa, a high school senior born in 2000, dreams of becoming a king. He encounters Tsukuyomi, a mysterious girl from the year 2068, who warns him that he is destined to become Ohma Zi-O, the tyrannical "Overlord of Time." Despite his unease about this possible future, Sougo assumes the mantle of Kamen Rider Zi-O to protect the space-time continuum from the Time Jackers, a group attempting to alter the history of the Heisei-era Kamen Riders for their own purposes. He is assisted by Geiz Myokoin, a resistance fighter from 2068 who transforms into Kamen Rider Geiz and initially seeks to kill Sougo to prevent his rise to tyranny, and by Woz, a self-proclaimed prophet who supports Sougo's path toward becoming Ohma Zi-O and later becomes Kamen Rider Woz. Along their journey, Sougo and his allies encounter past Kamen Riders and their companions, earning their trust and acquiring their powers.

After graduating from high school, Sougo learns that Swartz, the leader of the Time Jackers, is Tsukuyomi's older brother and has been manipulating both Riders and his fellow Jackers in a plan to merge the entire Kamen Rider multiverse into a single world, which he intends to destroy in order to save his own. Sougo and his allies ultimately fail to prevent Swartz's scheme until Sougo embraces his destiny as Ohma Zi-O to defeat him. However, rather than ruling as foretold, Sougo sacrifices his powers to reverse the damage caused by Swartz, creating a new reality where he lives peacefully with Geiz, Tsukuyomi, and the remaining Time Jackers.

== Production ==
The trademark for Kamen Rider Zi-O was registered by Toei on April 12, 2018.

== Episodes ==
As the series pays tribute to the Heisei-era Kamen Rider productions, each tribute episode title includes a short phrase referencing a specific Heisei Kamen Rider series along with a year associated with it. The involvement of Zi-O's predecessor, Kamen Rider Decade, gradually becomes more prominent throughout the show. An asterisk (*) denotes episodes where his appearance, or that of his ally Kamen Rider Diend, coincides with another Rider's tribute episode.

The series is divided into four narrative arcs:

- Birth of Zi-O (1–16): Introduces the main characters and overarching plot while paying tribute to Kamen Rider Build, Kamen Rider Ex-Aid, Kamen Rider Fourze, Faiz, Kamen Rider Wizard, Kamen Rider OOO, Kamen Rider Gaim, and Kamen Rider Ghost*.
- Ohma's Day (17–30): Centers on White Woz, who seeks to create Geiz Revive using the powers of three future Riders, while building toward the prophesied Ohma's Day. This arc also includes tributes to Kamen Rider Ryuki and Kamen Rider Blade*, and explores Sougo's past.
- Road to the King (31–40): Focuses on Tsukuyomi's past as she regains her memories. It features tributes to Kamen Rider Agito, Kamen Rider Hibiki, Kamen Rider Kiva, Kamen Rider Kabuto*, and Kamen Rider Den-O.
- The New Lord* (41–49): Reveals Swartz's true plan and depicts Sougo's transformation into Ohma Zi-O. This arc includes tributes to Kamen Rider Drive and film-exclusive Riders.

No.	Title	Directed by	Written by	Original release date
1	"Kingdom 2068"; Transliteration: "Kingudamu Nisen-rokujū-hachi" (Japanese: キングダム2068)	Ryuta Tasaki	Kento Shimoyama	September 2, 2018
2	"Best Match 2017"; Transliteration: "Besuto Matchi Nisen-jū-nana" (Japanese: ベストマッチ2017)	Ryuta Tasaki	Kento Shimoyama	September 9, 2018
3	"Doctor Gamer 2018"; Transliteration: "Dokutā Gēmā Nisen-jū-hachi" (Japanese: ドクターゲーマー2018)	Shojiro Nakazawa	Kento Shimoyama	September 16, 2018
4	"No Continue 2016"; Transliteration: "Nō Kontinyū Nisen-jū-roku" (Japanese: ノーコンティニュー2016)	Shojiro Nakazawa	Kento Shimoyama	September 23, 2018
5	"Switch On! 2011"; Transliteration: "Suitchi On! Nisen-jū-ichi" (Japanese: スイッチオン！2011)	Koichi Sakamoto	Kento Shimoyama	September 30, 2018
6	"555・913・2003"; Transliteration: "Faizu Kaiza Nisen-san" (Japanese: 555・913・2003)	Koichi Sakamoto	Kento Shimoyama	October 7, 2018
7	"Magic Showtime 2018"; Transliteration: "Majikku Shōtaimu Nisen-jū-hachi" (Japanese: マジック・ショータイム2018)	Satoshi Morota	Kento Shimoyama	October 14, 2018
8	"Beauty & Beast 2012"; Transliteration: "Byūti Ando Bīsuto Nisen-jū-ni" (Japanese: ビューティ＆ビースト2012)	Satoshi Morota	Kento Shimoyama	October 21, 2018
9	"Genm Master 2016"; Transliteration: "Genmu Masutā Nisen-jū-roku" (Japanese: ゲンムマスター2016)	Takayuki Shibasaki	Nobuhiro Mouri	October 28, 2018
10	"Hawk, Tiger, and Grasshopper 2010"; Transliteration: "Taka to Tora to Batta Nisen-jū" (Japanese: タカとトラとバッタ2010)	Takayuki Shibasaki	Nobuhiro Mouri	November 11, 2018
11	"Zi-O on Parade 2018"; Transliteration: "Jiō On Parēdo Nisen-jū-hachi" (Japanese: ジオウ・オン・パレード2018)	Kazuya Kamihoriuchi	Nobuhiro Mouri	November 18, 2018
12	"My × My Stage 2013"; Transliteration: "Ore Ore no Sutēji Nisen-jū-san" (Japanese: オレ×オレのステージ2013)	Kazuya Kamihoriuchi	Nobuhiro Mouri	November 25, 2018
13	"Ghost Hunter 2018"; Transliteration: "Gōsuto Hantā Nisen-jū-hachi" (Japanese: ゴーストハンター2018)	Satoshi Morota	Nobuhiro Mouri	December 2, 2018
14	"Go! Go! Ghost 2015"; Transliteration: "Gō! Gō! Gōsuto Nisen-jū-go" (Japanese: GO！GO！ゴースト2015)	Satoshi Morota	Nobuhiro Mouri	December 9, 2018
15	"Back to 2068"; Transliteration: "Bakku Tu Nisen-rokujū-hachi" (Japanese: バック・トゥ・2068)	Ryuta Tasaki	Nobuhiro Mouri	December 16, 2018
16	"Forever King 2018"; Transliteration: "Fōebā Kingu Nisen-jū-hachi" (Japanese: フォーエバー・キング2018)	Ryuta Tasaki	Nobuhiro Mouri	December 23, 2018
17	"Happy New Woz 2019"; Transliteration: "Happī Nyū Wozu Nisen-jū-kyū" (Japanese: ハッピーニューウォズ2019)	Takayuki Shibasaki	Kento Shimoyama	January 6, 2019
18	"Amazing! Era! Future! 2022"; Transliteration: "Sugoi! Jidai! Mirai! Nisen-nijū-ni" (Japanese: スゴイ！ジダイ！ミライ！2022)	Takayuki Shibasaki	Kento Shimoyama	January 13, 2019
19	"The Quiz Shock 2040"; Transliteration: "Za Kuizu Shokku Nisen-yonjū" (Japanese: ザ・クイズショック2040)	Satoshi Morota	Kento Shimoyama	January 20, 2019
20	"Final Answer? 2040"; Transliteration: "Fainaru Ansā? Nisen-yonjū" (Japanese: ファイナルアンサー？2040)	Satoshi Morota	Kento Shimoyama	January 27, 2019
21	"Mirror World 2019"; Transliteration: "Mirā Wārudo Nisen-jū-kyū" (Japanese: ミラーワールド2019)	Ryuta Tasaki	Kento Shimoyama	February 3, 2019
22	"Zi-O Strongest! 2019"; Transliteration: "Jiō Saikyoū! Nisen-jū-kyū" (Japanese: ジオウサイキョウー！2019)	Ryuta Tasaki	Kento Shimoyama	February 10, 2019
23	"It is Kikai! 2121"; Transliteration: "Kikai dā! Nisen-hyaku-nijū-ichi" (Japanese: キカイだー！2121)	Kyohei Yamaguchi	Kento Shimoyama	February 17, 2019
24	"Best Friend 2121"; Transliteration: "Besuto Furendo Nisen-hyaku-nijū-ichi" (Japanese: ベスト・フレンド2121)	Kyohei Yamaguchi	Kento Shimoyama	February 24, 2019
25	"Another Zi-O 2019"; Transliteration: "Anazā Jiō Nisen-jū-kyū" (Japanese: アナザージオウ2019)	Satoshi Morota	Kento Shimoyama	March 3, 2019
26	"GeizRevive! 2019"; Transliteration: "GeitsuRibaibu! Nisen-jū-kyū" (Japanese: ゲイツリバイブ！2019)	Satoshi Morota	Kento Shimoyama	March 10, 2019
27	"Where It All Began 2009"; Transliteration: "Subete no Hajimari Nisen-kyū" (Japanese: すべてのはじまり2009)	Ryuta Tasaki	Kento Shimoyama	March 17, 2019
28	"Our Goal 2019"; Transliteration: "Ore-tachi no Gōru Nisen-jū-kyū" (Japanese: オレたちのゴール2019)	Ryuta Tasaki	Kento Shimoyama	March 24, 2019
29	"Blade Joker!? 2019"; Transliteration: "Bureido Jōkā!? Nisen-jū-kyū" (Japanese: ブレイド・ジョーカー!?2019)	Kyohei Yamaguchi	Kento Shimoyama	March 31, 2019
30	"2019: Trinity Has Begun!"; Transliteration: "Nisen-jū-kyū: Toriniti Hajimemashita!" (Japanese: 2019：トリニティはじめました！)	Kyohei Yamaguchi	Kento Shimoyama	April 7, 2019
31	"2001: Awaken, the Agito!"; Transliteration: "Nisen-ichi: Mezamero, Sono Agito!" (Japanese: 2001：めざめろ、そのアギト！)	Teruaki Sugihara	Nobuhiro Mouri	April 14, 2019
32	"2001: Unknown Memories"; Transliteration: "Nisen-ichi: An'nōn na Kioku" (Japanese: 2001：アンノウンなキオク)	Teruaki Sugihara	Nobuhiro Mouri	April 21, 2019
33	"2005: Rejoice! Echo! Roar!"; Transliteration: "Nisen-go: Iwae! Hibike! Todoroke!" (Japanese: 2005：いわえ！ひびけ！とどろけ！)	Satoshi Morota	Nobuhiro Mouri	April 28, 2019
34	"2019: Heisei's Oni, Reiwa's Oni"; Transliteration: "Nisen-jū-kyū: Heisei no Oni, Reiwa no Oni" (Japanese: 2019：ヘイセイのオニ、レイワのオニ)	Satoshi Morota	Nobuhiro Mouri	May 5, 2019
35	"2008: First Love, Wake Up!"; Transliteration: "Nisen-hachi: Hatsukoi, Weiku Appu!" (Japanese: 2008：ハツコイ、ウェイクアップ！)	Naoki Tamura	Toshiki Inoue	May 12, 2019
36	"2019: First Love, Finaly!"; Transliteration: "Nisen-jū-kyū: Hatsukoi, Fainarī!" (Japanese: 2019：ハツコイ、ファイナリー！)	Naoki Tamura	Toshiki Inoue	May 19, 2019
37	"2006: Next Level Kabuto"; Transliteration: "Nisen-roku: Nekusuto Reberu Kabuto" (Japanese: 2006：ネクスト・レベル・カブト)	Kyohei Yamaguchi	Nobuhiro Mouri	May 26, 2019
38	"2019: The One Chosen by Kabuto"; Transliteration: "Nisen-jū-kyū: Kabuto ni Erabareshi Mono" (Japanese: 2019：カブトにえらばれしもの)	Kyohei Yamaguchi	Nobuhiro Mouri	June 2, 2019
39	"2007: DenLiner Crash!"; Transliteration: "Nisen-nana: Denrainā Kurasshu!" (Japanese: 2007：デンライナー・クラッシュ！)	Takayuki Shibasaki	Nobuhiro Mouri	June 9, 2019
40	"2017: Grand Climax!"; Transliteration: "Nisen-jū-nana: Gurando Kuraimakkusu!" (Japanese: 2017：グランド・クライマックス！)	Takayuki Shibasaki	Nobuhiro Mouri	June 23, 2019
41	"2019: World, Reset"; Transliteration: "Nisen-jū-kyū: Sekai, Risetto" (Japanese: 2019：セカイ、リセット)	Satoshi Morota	Nobuhiro Mouri	June 30, 2019
42	"2019: Missing World"; Transliteration: "Nisen-jū-kyū: Misshingu Wārudo" (Japanese: 2019：ミッシング・ワールド)	Satoshi Morota	Nobuhiro Mouri	July 7, 2019
43	"2019: Tsukuyomi Confidential"; Transliteration: "Nisen-jū-kyū: Tsukuyomi Konfidensharu" (Japanese: 2019：ツクヨミ・コンフィデンシャル)	Satoshi Morota	Nobuhiro Mouri	July 14, 2019
44	"2019: The Call of Aqua"; Transliteration: "Nisen-jū-kyū: Aqua no Yobigoe" (Japanese: 2019：アクアのよびごえ)	Kyohei Yamaguchi	Kento Shimoyama	July 21, 2019
45	"2019: Eternal Party"; Transliteration: "Nisen-jū-kyū: Etānaru Pāti" (Japanese: 2019：エターナル・パーティ)	Kyohei Yamaguchi	Kento Shimoyama	July 28, 2019
46	"2019: Operation Woz"; Transliteration: "Nisen-jū-kyū: Operēshon Wozu" (Japanese: 2019：オペレーション・ウォズ)	Kyohei Yamaguchi	Kento Shimoyama	August 4, 2019
47	"2019: The Vanishing Watches"; Transliteration: "Nisen-jū-kyū: Kieru Wotchi" (Japanese: 2019：きえるウォッチ)	Takayuki Shibasaki	Kento Shimoyama	August 11, 2019
48	"2068: Ohma Time"; Transliteration: "Nisen-rokujū-hachi: Ōma Taimu" (Japanese: 2068：オーマ・タイム)	Takayuki Shibasaki	Kento Shimoyama	August 18, 2019
49 (Finale)	"2019: Apocalypse"; Transliteration: "Nisen-jū-kyū: Apokaripusu" (Japanese: 2019：アポカリプス)	Takayuki Shibasaki	Kento Shimoyama	August 25, 2019

== Films ==
Kamen Rider Zi-O made his first appearance as a cameo in the film Kamen Rider Build the Movie: Be the One.

=== Heisei Generations Forever ===
Kamen Rider Heisei Generations Forever (仮面ライダー平成ジェネレーションズ FOREVER, Kamen Raidā Heisei Jenerēshonzu Fōebā) was released on December 22, 2018, as part of the Movie War series. It featured the casts of Kamen Rider Zi-O, Kamen Rider Build, and Kamen Rider Den-O. Actor Shunsuke Daitō portrayed the main antagonist, the Super Time Jacker Tid, while Kenichi Takitō provided the voice of the Imagin Futaros.

In addition to the Build cast, several former Kamen Rider actors returned, including Toshiki Kashu (Kamen Rider Agito), Takamasa Suga (Kamen Rider Ryuki), Masahiro Inoue (Kamen Rider Decade), and Shun Nishime (Kamen Rider Ghost), who reprised their roles vocally. Takeru Satoh (Kamen Rider Den-O) reprised his role as Ryotaro Nogami in person. The film serves as a shared tribute to Kamen Rider Kuuga, Kamen Rider Den-O, and Kamen Rider W.

=== Over Quartzer ===
Kamen Rider Zi-O the Movie: Over Quartzer (劇場版 仮面ライダージオウ Over Quartzer, Gekijōban Kamen Raidā Jiō Ōvā Kwōtsā) was released on July 26, 2019, as a double feature with Kishiryu Sentai Ryusoulger the Movie: Time Slip! Dinosaur Panic. The film featured Japanese boy band Da Pump as the Quartzers, the main antagonists. Da Pump vocalist ISSA portrayed Kamen Rider Barlckxs, while choreographer Papaya Suzuki (Zyuden Sentai Kyoryuger) and actor Syuusuke Saito portrayed Kamen Riders Zonjis and Zamonas, respectively.

Additionally, Kamen Rider Drive actors Yu Inaba and Chris Peppler reprised their roles. The film serves as a shared tribute to Kamen Rider Drive, the Heisei-era Kamen Rider productions with Showa-era themes (Black RX, Shin, ZO, J, and Amazons), and the entire Heisei Kamen Rider Series. It also introduced Kamen Rider Zero-One, the first Rider of the Reiwa period. The film takes place after episode 43 and provides an alternate ending to the series.

=== Reiwa The First Generation ===
Kamen Rider Reiwa The First Generation (仮面ライダー 令和 ザ・ファースト・ジェネレーション, Kamen Raidā Reiwa Za Fāsuto Jenerēshon) was released on December 21, 2019, featuring the casts of Kamen Rider Zi-O and Kamen Rider Zero-One. The film serves as a shared tribute to Kamen Rider Zero-One, the original Kamen Rider, and the entire Heisei Kamen Rider Series. Its events take place after the conclusion of the television series.

== Special episodes ==
=== Kamen Rider Zi-O: Supplementary Plan ===
Kamen Rider Zi-O: Supplementary Plan (仮面ライダージオウ 補完計画, Kamen Raidā Jiō Hokan Keikaku) is a web-exclusive series released on the Toei Tokusatsu Fan Club. Each episode was made available the day after the corresponding broadcast of the main series.

Episode	Title (English)	Original title	Romaji
1.5	Mystery of Naming	ネーミングの謎	Nēmingu no Nazo
2.5	Rules of the World	世界のルール	Sekai no Rūru
3.5	Regal Spoilers	王位なるネタバレ	Ōi Naru Netabare
4.5	Confession from A-Legends	Aレジェンドの告白	Ē Rejendo no Kokuhaku
5.5	Sougo Tokiwa and the Mysterious Phone	トキワ荘ゴと謎電話	Tokiwa Sōgo to Nazo Denwa
6.5	The Secret of Fourze 555	フォーゼ555の秘密	Fōze Faizu no Himitsu
7.5	Who Is the Worst Black?	最悪のブラックは誰だ	Saiaku no Burakku wa Dare da
8.5	The Terrifying Time Paradox!	恐怖のタイムパラドックス！	Kyōfu no Taimu Paradokkusu!
9.5	The King, God, and Adult	王と神とオトナ	Ō to Kami to Otona
10.5	Mouri vs. Shimoyama	モーリ対シモヤマ	Mōri Tai Shimoyama
11.5	Mysteries of 95DO!	謎の95DO！	Nazo no Kujigojidō
12.5	Interview With Future People	インタビュー・ウィズ・未来人	Intabyū Wizu Miraijin
13.5	Ghost Teacher	ユーレイの先生	Yūrei no Sensei
14.5	Pink Devil	ピンクの悪魔	Pinku no Akuma
15.5	Supplementary Plan Forever: Part 1	補完計画よ永遠に（前編）	Hokan Keikaku yo Eien ni (Zenpen)
16.5	Supplementary Plan Forever: Part 2	補完計画よ永遠に（後編）	Hokan Keikaku yo Eien ni (Kōhen)

---

=== Rider Time: Kamen Rider Shinobi ===
Released on the Toei Tokusatsu Fan Club on March 31, 2019. Written by Kaori Kaneko and directed by Takayuki Shibasaki. The theme song is "IZANAGI", performed by Sakuramen feat. Hideya Tawada.

Episode	Title (English)	Original title	Romaji
1	First NinPow!: Hattari's Love Is Unrequited	FIRST 忍POW！ハッタリの恋はイッポウ通行の巻	Fāsuto Ninpō! Hattari no Koi wa Ippō Tsūkō no Maki
2	Next NinPow!!: Yaminin's Assassination Technique	NEXT 忍POW!!闇忍の暗殺殺ポウの巻	Nekusuto Ninpō!! Yaminin no Ansatsu Sappō no Maki
3	Last NinPow!!!: Dead End and Close Call	LAST 忍POW!!!八ポウ塞がり危機一髪の巻	Rasuto Ninpō!!! Happō Fusagari Kikiippatsu no Maki

---

=== Rider Time: Kamen Rider Ryuki ===
Released on Video Pass on March 31, 2019. Written by Toshiki Inoue and directed by Takayuki Shibasaki. The theme song is "Go! Now! ~Alive A life neo~", performed by Rica Matsumoto.

Episode	Title
1	Advent Again
2	Another Alternative
3	Alive a Life

---

=== Kamen Rider Zi-O vs. Decade: 7 of Zi-Os! ===
Released on Telasa on February 9, 2021. Written by Toshiki Inoue and directed by Satoshi Morota. The theme song is "INSIDE-OUT ZI-O ver.", performed by So Okuno and Masahiro Inoue.

Episode	Title (English)	Original title	Romaji
1	The Drifting School	漂流学園	Hyōryū Gakuen
2	Eve of the War	戦争前夜	Sensō Zen'ya
3	The Last Sougo	最後のソウゴ	Saigo no Sōgo

---

=== Kamen Rider Decade vs. Zi-O: The Decade House Death Game ===
Released on the Toei Tokusatsu Fan Club on February 9, 2021. Written by Toshiki Inoue and directed by Satoshi Morota. The theme song is "INSIDE-OUT DECADE ver.", performed by Masahiro Inoue and So Okuno.

Episode	Title
1	The First Stage
2	The Next Stage
3	The Final Stage

---

=== Kamen Rider Bi Bi Bi no Bibill Geiz ===
Kamen Rider Bi Bi Bi no Bibill Geiz (仮面ライダービビビのビビルゲイツ, Kamen Raidā Bi Bi Bi no Bibiru Geitsu) is the Televi-Kun "Hyper Battle DVD" (超(ハイパー)バトルDVD, Haipā Batoru Dī Bui Dī) for Kamen Rider Zi-O. The events of this special take place prior to episode 45.

== Kamen Rider Zi-O Next Time ==
Kamen Rider Zi-O Next Time: Geiz, Majesty (仮面ライダージオウ NEXT TIME ゲイツ、マジェスティ, Kamen Raidā Jiō Nekusuto Taimu Geitsu, Majesuti) is a V-Cinema release that serves as a side story focusing on Geiz Myokoin. The events of the film take place after the conclusion of the television series and Kamen Rider Reiwa: The First Generation.

The V-Cinema was written by Nobuhiro Mouri and directed by Satoshi Morota. It was released on April 22, 2020. Kimito Totani (Kamen Rider Decade), Kōhei Murakami (Kamen Rider 555), Minehiro Kinomoto (Kamen Rider W), and Hiroaki Iwanaga (Kamen Rider OOO) reprised their respective roles.

The theme song is "Brand New Day," performed by Triplane.

== Novel ==
Novel: Kamen Rider Zi-O (小説 仮面ライダージオウ, Shōsetsu Kamen Raidā Jiō), written by Kento Shimoyama, is part of a series of spin-off novel adaptations of the Heisei-era Kamen Rider series. The events of the novel take place after the conclusion of the television series. It was released on July 28, 2021.

== Video game ==
Kamen Rider: Climax Scramble, known in Japan as Kamen Rider: Climax Scramble Zi-O (仮面ライダー クライマックススクランブル ジオウ, Kamen Raidā Kuraimakkusu Sukuranburu Jiō), is the seventh installment in the Kamen Rider: Climax video game series. It was released on November 29, 2018, for the Nintendo Switch.

== Cast ==
- Sougo Tokiwa (常磐 ソウゴ, Tokiwa Sōgo): So Okuno (奥野 壮, Okuno Sō)
- Geiz Myokoin (明光院 ゲイツ, Myōkōin Geitsu): Gaku Oshida (押田 岳, Oshida Gaku)
- Tsukuyomi (ツクヨミ): Shieri Ohata (大幡 しえり, Ōhata Shieri)
- Woz (ウォズ, Wozu): Keisuke Watanabe (渡邊 圭祐, Watanabe Keisuke)
- Heure (ウール, Ūru): Rihito Itagaki (板垣 李光人, Itagaki Rihito)
- Ora (オーラ, Ōra): Ayaka Konno (紺野 彩夏, Kon'no Ayaka)
- Swartz (スウォルツ, Suworutsu): Kentarou Kanesaki (兼崎 健太郎, Kanesaki Kentarō)
- Junichirō Tokiwa (常磐 順一郎, Tokiwa Jun'ichirō): Katsuhisa Namase (生瀬 勝久, Namase Katsuhisa)
- Tsukasa Kadoya (門矢 士, Kadoya Tsukasa): Masahiro Inoue (井上 正大, Inoue Masahiro)
- Daiki Kaito (海東 大樹, Kaitō Daiki): Kimito Totani (戸谷 公人, Totani Kimito)
- Hiryū Kakogawa (加古川 飛流, Kakogawa Hiryū): Yu Sakuma (佐久間 悠, Sakuma Yū)

=== Voice cast ===
- Ohma Zi-O (オーマジオウ, Ōma Jiō), Opening Narration: Rikiya Koyama (小山 力也, Koyama Rikiya)
- Ziku-Driver (ジクウドライバー, Jikū Doraibā): Rikiya Koyama, Yohei Onishi (大西 洋平, Ōnishi Yōhei)
- BeyonDriver (ビヨンドライバー, Biyondoraibā): Afro (アフロ, Afuro)
- Neo DecaDriver (ネオディケイドライバー, Neo Dikeidoraibā), Neo DienDriver (ネオディエンドライバー, Neo Diendoraibā): Mark Okita (マーク・大喜多, Māku Ōkita)
- Narrator: Naohiko Fujino (藤野 直彦, Fujino Naohiko)

=== Guest cast ===
- Resistance captain (1): Kazutoshi Yokoyama (横山 一敏, Yokoyama Kazutoshi)
- Sento Kiryu (桐生 戦兎, Kiryū Sento; 1–2): Atsuhiro Inukai (犬飼 貴丈, Inukai Atsuhiro)
- Ryuga Banjo (万丈 龍我, Banjō Ryūga; 1–2): Eiji Akaso (赤楚 衛二, Akaso Eiji)
- Emu Hojo (宝生 永夢, Hōjō Emu; 2–4): Hiroki Iijima (飯島 寛騎, Iijima Hiroki)
- Hiiro Kagami (鏡 飛彩, Kagami Hiiro; 3–4): Toshiki Seto (瀬戸 利樹, Seto Toshiki)
- Ryūichi Sakuma (佐久間 龍一, Sakuma Ryūichi; 5–6, 25): Atom Mizuishi (水石 亜飛夢, Mizuishi Atomu)
- Chuta Ohsugi (大杉 忠太, Ōsugi Chūta; 5–6): Takushi Tanaka (田中 卓志, Tanaka Takushi) (of Ungirls)
- Daita Kondo (近藤 大太, Kondō Daita; 5): Kazuyoshi Nakazawa (中澤 兼利, Nakazawa Kazuyoshi)
- Chikao Nezu (根津 誓夫, Nezu Chikao; 5): Yuya Hara (原 勇弥, Hara Yūya)
- Takumi Inui (乾 巧, Inui Takumi; 5–6): Kento Handa (半田 健人, Handa Kento)
- Masato Kusaka (草加 雅人, Kusaka Masato; 5–6): Kōhei Murakami (村上 幸平, Murakami Kōhei)
- Kaori Kinoshita (木ノ下 香織, Kinoshita Kaori; 7–8): Minase Yashiro (八代 みなせ, Yashiro Minase)
- Kosuke Nito (仁藤 攻介, Nitō Kōsuke; 7–8): Tasuku Nagase (永瀬 匡, Nagase Tasuku)
- Kuroto Dan (檀 黎斗, Dan Kuroto; 8–10): Tetsuya Iwanaga (岩永 徹也, Iwanaga Tetsuya)
- Eiji Hino (火野 映司, Hino Eiji; 9–10): Shu Watanabe (渡部 秀, Watanabe Shū)
- Hina Izumi (泉 比奈, Izumi Hina; 9–10): Riho Takada (高田 里穂, Takada Riho)
- Kouta Kazuraba (葛葉 紘汰, Kazuraba Kōta; 10–12): Gaku Sano (佐野 岳, Sano Gaku)
- Kaito Kumon (駆紋 戒斗, Kumon Kaito; 11–12): Yutaka Kobayashi (小林 豊, Kobayashi Yutaka)
- Takeru Tenkūji (天空寺 タケル, Tenkūji Takeru; 12–14): Shun Nishime (西銘 駿, Nishime Shun)
- Shibuya (シブヤ; 13): Takuya Mizoguchi (溝口 琢矢, Mizoguchi Takuya)
- Narita (ナリタ; 13–14): Reo Kansyuji (勧修寺 玲旺, Kanshūji Reo)
- Makoto Fukami (深海 マコト, Fukami Makoto; 14): Ryosuke Yamamoto (山本 涼介, Yamamoto Ryōsuke)
- Mika (ミカ, Mika; 13–14): Ichika Osaki (尾碕 真花; Osaki Ichika)
- Rentarō Kagura (神蔵 蓮太郎, Kagura Rentarō; 17–18): Hideya Tawada (多和田 任益, Tawada Hideya)
- Mondo Dōan (堂安 主水, Dōan Mondo; 18–20): Katsuhiro Suzuki (鈴木 勝大, Suzuki Katsuhiro)
- Shinji Kido (城戸 真司, Kido Shinji; 21–22): Takamasa Suga (須賀 貴匡, Suga Takamasa)
- Daisuke Okubo (大久保 大介, Ōkubo Daisuke; 21–22): Kanji Tsuda (津田 寛治, Tsuda Kanji)
- Rento Makina (真紀那 レント, Makina Rento; 23–24): Jingi Irie (入江 甚儀, Irie Jingi)
- Manager (25–26): Tadashi Mizuno (水野 直, Mizuno Tadashi)
- Kazuma Kenzaki (剣崎 一真, Kenzaki Kazuma; 29–30): Takayuki Tsubaki (椿 隆之, Tsubaki Takayuki)
- Hajime Aikawa (相川 始, Aikawa Hajime; 29–30): Ryoji Morimoto (森本 亮治, Morimoto Ryōji)
- Amane Kurihara (栗原 天音, Kurihara Amane; 29–30): Hikari Kajiwara (梶原 ひかり, Kajiwara Hikari)
- Shoichi Tsugami (津上 翔一, Tsugami Shōichi; 31–32): Toshiki Kashu (賀集 利樹, Kashū Toshiki)
- Mana Kazaya (風谷 真魚, Kazaya Mana; 31–32): Rina Akiyama (秋山 莉奈, Akiyama Rina)
- Takahiro Omuro (尾室 隆弘, Omuro Takahiro; 31–32): Akiyoshi Shibata (柴田 明良, Shibata Akiyoshi)
- Kyosuke Kiriya (桐矢 京介, Kiriya Kyōsuke; 33–34), Yuto Sakurai (桜井 侑斗, Sakurai Yūto; 39–40): Yūichi Nakamura (中村 優一, Nakamura Yūichi)
- Todoroki (トドロキ; 33–34): Shingo Kawaguchi (川口 真五, Kawaguchi Shingo)
- Yūko Kitajima (北島 祐子, Kitajima Yūko; 35–36): Yumiko Shaku (釈 由美子, Shaku Yumiko)
- Jiro (次狼, Jirō; 35–36): Kenji Matsuda (松田 賢二, Matsuda Kenji)
- Young beauty (36): Yu Takahashi (高橋 ユウ, Takahashi Yū)
- Kamen Rider Ginga (仮面ライダーギンガ, Kamen Raidā Ginga; 35, 36, Voice): Tomokazu Sugita (杉田 智和, Sugita Tomokazu)
- Arata Kagami (加賀美 新, Kagami Arata; 37–38): Yuki Sato (佐藤 祐基, Satō Yūki)
- Sou Yaguruma (矢車 想, Yaguruma Sō; 37–38): Hidenori Tokuyama (徳山 秀典, Tokuyama Hidenori)
- Shun Kageyama (影山 瞬, Kageyama Shun; 37–38): Masato Uchiyama (内山 眞人, Uchiyama Masato)
- Momotaros (モモタロス, Momotarosu; Voice; 39–40): Toshihiko Seki (関 俊彦, Seki Toshihiko)
- Urataros (ウラタロス, Uratarosu; Voice; 39–40): Kōji Yusa (遊佐 浩二, Yusa Kōji)
- Kintaros (キンタロス, Kintarosu; Voice; 39–40): Masaki Terasoma (てらそま まさき, Terasoma Masaki)
- Ryutaros (リュウタロス, Ryūtarosu; Voice; 39–40): Kenichi Suzumura (鈴村 健一, Suzumura Ken'ichi)
- Deneb (デネブ, Denebu; Voice; 39–40): Hōchū Ōtsuka (大塚 芳忠, Ōtsuka Hōchū)
- Takuya Endo (遠藤タクヤ, Endō Takuya; 39–40): Dai Goto (後藤大, Gotō Dai)
- Michal Minato (湊 ミハル, Minato Miharu; 44–46): Atsushi Arai (荒井 敦史, Arai Atsushi)
- Katsumi Daido (大道 克己, Daidō Katsumi; 45–46): Mitsuru Matsuoka (松岡 充, Matsuoka Mitsuru)
- Chase (チェイス, Cheisu; 47–48): Taiko Katono (上遠野 太洸, Katōno Taikō)

== Theme songs ==
=== Opening theme ===
- "Over "Quartzer""
  - Lyrics: Shuta Sueyoshi, Takaki Mizoguchi
  - Composition: MiNE, Atsushi Shimada
  - Arrangement: Atsushi Shimada
  - Artist: Shuta Sueyoshi feat. ISSA

=== Insert themes ===
- "Zi-O Toki no Ōja" (ジオウ 時の王者, Jiō Toki no Ōja; "Zi-O the King of Time")
  - Lyrics: Shōko Fujibayashi
  - Composition & Arrangement: Toshihiko Sahashi
  - Artist: Sougo Tokiwa (So Okuno)
  - Episodes: 16, 22
  - Notes: Theme for Kamen Rider Zi-O
- "FUTURE GUARDIAN"
  - Lyrics: Shōko Fujibayashi
  - Composition & Arrangement: Toshihiko Sahashi
  - Artist: Geiz Myokoin (Gaku Oshida)
  - Episodes: 19
  - Notes: Theme for Kamen Rider Geiz
- "Black & White"
  - Lyrics: Megane Hirai
  - Composition & Arrangement: Go Sakabe
  - Artist: Woz (Keisuke Watanabe)
  - Episodes: 38
  - Notes: Theme for Kamen Rider Woz
- "Next New Wφrld"
  - Lyrics: Ricky
  - Composition & Arrangement: nishi-ken
  - Artist: Rider Chips
  - Episodes: 40
  - Notes: Theme for Kamen Rider Grand Zi-O
- Reused opening and insert themes from previous series include "BELIEVE YOURSELF" from Kamen Rider Agito in episode 32 and "Kagayaki" from Kamen Rider Hibiki in episode 34.
