= 999 (Malaysian TV series) =

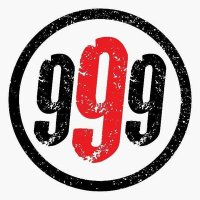
- Country of origin: Malaysia
- Original language: Malay
- No. of seasons: 23

Production
- Running time: 1 hour with commercials
- Production company: Primeworks Studios (August 2008–2020)

Original release
- Network: TV3
- Release: 3 January 2002 – present

999 is a Malaysian investigative reality television series show that has aired on TV3 continuously since 3 January 2002. The show is currently being hosted by Sofea Nursolehha Tun.

Former hosts of the show were Zakiah Anas, Mazidul Akmal Sidek, Halim Din and Omar Abdullah. In its first year, it was one of Malaysia's most watched TV programmes with an audience of over three million.

== Hosts ==
- Zakiah Anas (2002–2009)
- Hazlin Hussain (2010–2017)
- Sarah Adiba Yussof from (2017–2018)
- Anim Ezati Rizki (1 January 2018 – 31 March 2020)
- Sofea Nursolehha Tun (31 March 2020–present)

=== Reporters ===
- Omar Abdullah - 2002–2005, producer
- Halim Din - 2002–2009, 2020/2021
- Mazidul Akmal Sidek - 2002–2010
- Haris Farouk Alex - 2012–2021
- Tun Hizami Hashim - 2014–2020, 2021–23
- Nor Izzati Lockman - 2016–2020
- Faizal Murad - 2017–2020
- Haziq Hamid - 2020–2021
- Afifah Aminudin - 2021–preswnt
- Aresya Khalim - 2021–present
- Ainul Raof - 2021–present

=== Guest host ===
- Kamal Effendi Hashim, former police officer and crime analyst (from 2003 to 2006)
- Nor Zabeta, lawyer (2019–present)
- Dato Akhbar Satar, detective
- Dato Hazim Pilay, lawyer

== In popular culture ==
999 has made an appearance in the Malaysian action movie J2: Retribusi starring Zul Ariffin, Ashraf Sinclair and former 999 host Anim Ezati, serving as a cameo of herself during the ending scene and it's Disney Hotstar premiering in 2021. The show has also made an appearance in the Malaysian drama Gerak Khas Undercover, aired by TV3 starring Khalida Balqis as Alia in 2021.
