= How Do We Relationship? =

Japanese manga series by Tamifull

- First tankōbon volume cover

付き合ってあげてもいいかな (Tsukiatte Agetemo Ii Kana)
- Genre: Romantic comedy; Slice of life; Yuri
- Manga
- Written by: Tamifull
- Published by: Shogakukan
- English publisher: NA: Viz Media
- Imprint: Ura Sunday Comics
- Magazine: Ura Sunday; MangaONE
- Original run: August 17, 2018 – March 14, 2025
- Volumes: 14
- Television drama
- Directed by: Kana Yamada (1–3, 6, 8); Sunhye Hong (4, 5, 7)
- Written by: Miki Matsugasako
- Music by: Tomohide Harada
- Original network: MBS
- Original run: September 11, 2026 – October 30, 2026
- Episodes: 8
- icon

How Do We Relationship? (Japanese: 付き合ってあげてもいいかな, Hepburn: Tsukiatte Agetemo Ii Kana) is a Japanese manga series written and illustrated by Tamifull. It was serialized on Shogakukan's MangaONE and Ura Sunday web platforms from August 2018 to March 2025, with its chapters collected in 14 tankōbon volumes. The manga has been licensed in North America by Viz Media. An eight-episode television drama adaptation aired from September to October 2026.

== Synopsis ==
After Miwa Inuzuka enters university, she by chance becomes friends with Saeko Sawatari, her polar opposite. At Saeko's invitation, she joins the music club, and while conversing, they come out to each other as lesbian. Saeko suggests they start dating, and although Miwa does not have romantic feelings for Saeko, her interest in learning what a relationship is like leads her to agree to date her.

== Characters ==
Miwa Inuzuka (犬塚 みわ, Inuzuka Miwa)
Portrayed by: Sakurako Konishi
A college student with short black hair. She is not very good at music but plays bass guitar in the club. She is popular with men, but has never been in a relationship and Saeko is her first. She has her driving license, but after passing the exam, her instructor told her she is fundamentally unsuited for driving. She is shy but becomes bold when drunk.
Saeko Sawatari (猿渡 冴子, Sawatari Saeko)
Portrayed by: Riho Sayashi
She is the music club's electric guitarist and songwriter. Her hair is long and brightly dyed. She has had relationships with both men and women but recalls bitter memories of dating a girl in middle school and describes her dating history with men as her "desire to be normal gone awry".
Mikkun (みっくん)
Portrayed by: Eiku Yamashita
The vocalist of the music club. He is the first to learn of Miwa and Saeko's relationship; though initially surprised, he is accepting.
Tsuruta (鶴田)
Portrayed by: Kū Ijima
The drummer of the music club. Before entering university, he was an otaku interested in anime and video games. He has little experience with love and falls in love with Miwa at first sight. Despite being rejected after confessing to her, he has difficulty moving on. Although he outwardly supports Miwa and Saeko's relationship, he possesses mixed feelings about it.
Rucha (ルチャ)
Portrayed by: Yo Aoi
A guitarist in the music club. He went to an all-boys high school.

== Media ==
=== Manga ===
Written and illustrated by Tamifull, How Do We Relationship was first distributed as a doujinshi at COMITIA in 2018, and later began serialization in Shogakukan's MangaONE and Ura Sunday web platforms on August 17 of that same year, under their female-oriented "Ura Sunday Joshi-bu" (裏サンデー女子部) label. The series finished serialization on March 14, 2025. Shogakukan collected its chapters in 14 tankōbon volumes, released from January 11, 2019, to April 17, 2025.

In North America, Viz Media announced the English language release of the manga in October 2019. The first volume was released on June 9, 2020. On May 9, 2023, Viz Media launched their Viz Manga digital manga service, with the series's chapters receiving simultaneous English publication in North America as they were released in Japan.

==== Volumes ====
No.	Original release date	Original ISBN	English release date	English ISBN
1	January 11, 2019	978-4-09-128755-7	June 9, 2020	978-1-9747-1174-1
2	June 12, 2019	978-4-09-129235-3	December 8, 2020	978-1-9747-1739-2
3	December 12, 2019	978-4-09-129500-2	June 8, 2021	978-1-9747-1938-9
4	April 10, 2020	978-4-09-850095-6	October 12, 2021	978-1-9747-2074-3
5	October 16, 2020	978-4-09-850300-1	February 8, 2022	978-1-9747-2410-9
6	March 12, 2021	978-4-09-850475-6	July 26, 2022	978-1-9747-2720-9
7	September 9, 2021	978-4-09-850698-9	October 25, 2022	978-1-9747-3244-9
8	February 17, 2022	978-4-09-850892-1	January 24, 2023	978-1-9747-3617-1
9	August 19, 2022	978-4-09-851240-9	July 25, 2023	978-1-9747-3882-3
10	February 17, 2023	978-4-09-851636-0	January 23, 2024	978-1-9747-4287-5
11	September 12, 2023	978-4-09-852823-3	August 27, 2024	978-1-9747-4703-0
12	February 19, 2024	978-4-09-853133-2	January 28, 2025	978-1-9747-5270-6
13	October 18, 2024	978-4-09-853649-8	September 23, 2025	978-1-9747-5836-4
14	April 17, 2025	978-4-09-854073-0	April 14, 2026	978-1-9747-6254-5

=== Drama ===
In July 2026, it was announced that the manga would receive an eight-episode television drama adaptation. It was broadcast on MBS from September 11 to October 30, 2026. (Note: MBS lists the series air dates on Thursday at 24:59, effectively Friday at 0:59 a.m. JST.) It was directed by Kana Yamada (episodes 1–3, 6, and 8) and Sunhye Hong (episodes 4, 5, and 7), with scripts penned by Miki Matsugasako, and music composed by Tomohide Harada. Momoko Nishiyama was credited as the "intimacy coordinator", and Yuri Igarashi was credited for LGBTQ supervision.

== Reception ==
In 2019, How Do We Relationship? was nominated for the fifth Next Manga Awards in the digital category and placed 13th out of 50 nominees.
