= Jejak Rasul =

Malaysian television series

- Developed by: Media Prima Berhad
- Presented by: Zainal Ariffin Ismail (1996–2007, 2014); Nizal Muhammad (1996-1997); Haji Ahmad Noor Sulaiman (2008-2009); Ezzah Aziz Fawzy (2010 - 2011); Ahmad Fedtri Yahya (2013, 2019, 2020, 2021); Nasir Yusof (2010, 2011, 2013); Anwar Afiq (2015-2016); Da'i Tajdid Hadhari (2017); Wan Farid Wan Mohamed (2011)
- Theme music composer: Peter Lim; Re-arrange and recompose in 2019; Music and sing by Hafiz Hamidun; Lyrics by Ahmad Fedtri Yahya
- Country of origin: Malaysia
- No. of seasons: 27

Production
- Executive producer: Zainal Abidin Ismail
- Producers: Wan Alias Abdullah; Jasmi Shahir; Muhamad Amin Yusoff; Mohd Fasil Mohd Idris
- Running time: approx. 30 minutes
- Production company: Primeworks Studios

Original release
- Network: TV3
- Release: 21 January 1996 – 29 November 2012

Jejak Rasul (Malay: The Footpath of the Prophets) is a Malaysian Islamic documentary television series. The show is broadcast on TV3 since 1996 and is always broadcast daily during the Ramadan fasting month, typically in the late afternoon or in the evening a few hours before the breaking of fast.

It has been rerunning daily on TV3 at 5:30 am as of 2012 while its early episodes have been reran on TV9, Astro Oasis and on the Emas channel as well as Salam HD on TM's Unifi TV (formerly known as Hypp TV). In 2017, TV Alhijrah reran the first season daily during Ramadan while obscuring the original TV3 logo.

In 2018, TV3 decided to rerun one of the seasons which is 2013 Ramadhan in 3 Holy Lands – Ramadan di 3 Tanah Suci. This decision is likely because of the declining revenue made by Media Prima. Surprisingly, during 2018 eid season, TV3 aired a pilot episode of the new Jejak Rasul series which is Jejak Rasul Ulul Azmi (The Arch Prophet) hosted by Ahmad Fedtri Yahya. On the episode, it had been mentioned that The Arch Prophet will be the main theme for the 2019 season and the other following seasons to come (There are five Arch-prophets in Islam; Nuh (Noah), Ibrahim (Abraham), Musa (Moses), Isa (Jesus) and Muhammad). In 2019, TV3 aired Jejak Rasul Ulul Azmi focusing on Prophet Musa (Moses) as the theme. For 2020 season, Prophet Nuh (Noah) and Ibrahim (Abraham) become the main focus of the season. For the third time Ahmad Fedtri Yahya hosted the series and this time the crews explore Turkey and Jordan.

Due to COVID-19 pandemic that lead to travel restrictions, the third season of Jejak Rasul Ulul Azmi was postponed. Instead, the Jejak Rasul crew will explore Islam on their own country - Malaysia.

The show's episodes have also been released in VHS and DVD formats. The show has also inspired other local TV stations to air documentaries similar to this format such as Ayat Riwayat on TV Alhijrah, Syahadah on TV1 and Al-Risaalah on TV9.

== List of seasons ==
Seasons	Title / Theme	Year AD	Year AH	Original airing schedule	Topic plus further notes
1	25 Prophets in Islam	Jan - Feb 1996	1416		
2	25 Prophets in Islam	Jan - Feb 1997	1417		
3	Islam in North Africa, Europe, Mediterranean and Balkans	Dec 1997 – Jan 1998	1418		(North Africa and Europe)
4	Berjuta Wajah, Satu Akidah (Million Faces, One Faith)	Dec 1998 – Jan 1999	1419		The crews explore and meet Muslim around Kazakhstan, Kyrgyzstan, China, Maldives, Iran, Pakistan and India
5	Satu Akidah, Satu Sempadan (One Faith, One Boundary)	Dec 1999 - Jan 2000	1420		(Southeast Asia)
6	Satu Arah, Satu Tujuan (One Destination, One Goal)	Nov - Dec 2000	1421		(Africa)
7	Mesir, Bumi Anbia (Egypt, Land of the Prophets)	Nov - Dec 2001	1422		Focuses on the significant events as recorded during the lives of the Prophets long before (Moses, Aaron etc.) that took place in Egypt.
8	Sutera Laut, Bicara Syahadah (The Sea Silk, The Spread of Syahadah)	Nov - Dec 2002	1423		The Sea Silk refers to the sea routes used by Arab merchants as they were sailing to Asia and other parts of the world which also propelled the spread Islam in these areas.
9	Warkah Mesopotamia (Letters of Mesopotamia)	Oct - Nov 2003	1424		
10	Sejagat Yang Berdaulat (A Universal Sovereign)	Oct - Nov 2004	1425		
11	Sicupak dari Istanbul (The Sicupak from Istanbul)	Oct - Nov 2005	1426		'Sicupak' here comes from the 'Lada Sicupak' Cannon, which was given by the Ottoman Turks to the Aceh Sultanate, as a response of aid requested from the Sultan of Aceh to chase away the Portuguese from invading Aceh. This series depicts the history of Aceh Sultanate and Turkish Ottoman Empire.
12	Nabi Muhammad	Sep - Oct 2006	1427		Based on Muhammad's biography 'Sirah Nabawiyah', written and compiled by Ibn Hisham.
13	Sahabat (The Companions)	Sep - Oct 2007	1428	Monday - Friday	Touches upon Muhammad's Companions, who were also the successors of his community – known as The Four Righteous Caliphs.
13	As-Salam USA	Sep - Oct 2007	1428	Saturday & Sunday	A split-off series highlighting the lives of Americans Muslims plus their roles in their local communities.
14	Rihlah Ibn Battutah (The Rihla of Ibn Battutah)	Sep - Oct 2008	1429		Revisits the famous travelogue of Ibn Battuta.
15	Sirah Anbiya (History of the Prophets)	Aug - Sep 2009	1430		
16	Trilogi Suara Kebenaran (The Voice of Truth Trilogy)	Aug - Sep 2010	1431		There are 3 different segments that focuses on 3 different topics: Segment 1: Srikandi; Segment 2: Jihad; Segment 3: Yahudi dan Bani Israel The season hosted by 3 different host for each segment.
17	Legasi Muhammad s.a.w di Eropah Timur (Muhammad's Legacy in the Eastern Europe)	Aug 2011	1432	Daily	The season highlighted Muslim world in Russia and Ukraine and the challenges faced by them.
18	Al-Quran & Sirah Anbiya	Jul - Aug 2012	1433	Fridays to Sundays (13 episodes)	Recaps of past seasons of the documentary.
19	Ramadan di Tiga Tanah Suci (Ramadan in the Three Holy Lands)	Jul - Aug 2013	1434	Daily	This season was aired daily as in previous years but not in 2012. This season's filming was made on the year before this was broadcast, i.e. Ramadan 1433 AH (July–August 2012).
20	Rehlah Dua Daie (The Rihla of the Two Preachers)	Jun - Jul 2014	1435	Fridays to Sundays (15 episodes, with one Aidilfitri special)	Revolved around two viewers of Jejak Rasul reflecting on their troubled pasts, plus their changed lives and their current missionary work. Zainal Ariffin Ismail presented as he accompanied their travels to Jordan and Palestine on a period of 40 days.
21	As-Salam 2015: Saudara Dari Timur (Relatives from The East)	Jun - Jul 2015	1436	Fridays to Sundays	Anwar Afiq replaced Zainal Ariffin Ismail as the new host. The crews explored the spread of Islam in the East Asian countries of South Korea, Japan and Taiwan.
22	As-Salam 2016: Gema Azan di Oceania (Adhan in Oceania)	Jun - Jul 2016	1437	Fridays to Sundays	Jejak Rasul crews explored the Muslim minorities in Papua New Guinea and Fiji.
23	As-Salam 2017: Tinggalan Anbiya' & Kesahihannya (The Prophets' Relics and The Truth of Them)	May - Jun 2017	1438	Fridays to Sundays	Jejak Rasul crews explored Palestine, Jordan and Turkey to find the truth of stories and relics left by the prophets.
24	Ramadan di 3 Tanah Suci (Ramadan in 3 Holy Lands)	May - Jun 2018	1439	Fridays to Sundays	It was a rerun episodes from 2013 season.
25	Ulul Azmi (The Arch Prophet)	May - Jun 2019	1440	Fridays to Sundays	The focus of the season is Prophet Musa (Moses) as one of The Arch Prophet in Islam.
26	Ulul Azmi (2020) (The Arch Prophet)	April - May 2020	1441	Fridays to Sundays	Jejak Rasul crews chose Prophet Nuh (Noah) and Ibrahim (Abraham) as the main focus to explore.
27	Ulama Pewaris Rasul (Muslim Scholars: The Heirs of Prophets)	April - May 2021	1442	Fridays to Sundays	Jejak Rasul crews visit 7 states in Malaysia to explore Islam in Malaysia and uncover the footpaths of the Muslim scholars who spread Islam in the country.
28	Ulama Pewaris Rasul (Muslim Scholars: The Heirs of Prophets)	2022	1443	Fridays to Sundays	
29	Ulama Pewaris Rasul (Muslim Scholars: The Heirs of Prophets)	2023	1444	Saturdays and Sundays	
30	Ulul Azmi (The Arch Prophet)	2024	1445	Saturdays	It was a re-run series from 2019. There are 4 chosen episodes to be telecast.

== Sponsors ==
- Olive House
- Agro Bank
- Celcom
- Mofaz Corporation
- Johor Corporation
- Bank Islam
- RHB Islamic Bank
- Persatuan Pengimport dan Kenderaan Melayu Malaysia (PEKEMA) in season 20.
- V'asia Cosmetic & Healthcare
- Department of Museums Malaysia (Jabatan Muzium Malaysia)
- Baraka Pharmaniaga
- Kao Corporation Malaysia
- Arastu

== International broadcast ==
Brunei:

- RTB

Indonesia:

- TPI
- Trans TV
- ANTV
- TVRI (2020)
- Kompas TV (2012, 2021–2023)
- Trans7 (2023–present)

Singapore:

- Mediacorp Channel 5 (2015-present)
- Suria (2012-present)
- CNA (2019-present)

Malaysia

- Astro Ria (2019-present)
