= Gang Starz =

- Gang Starz logo
- Starring: Faizal Tahir; Putri Andreanna (2007)
- Country of origin: Malaysia

Production
- Executive producer: Sufian Isa

Original release
- Network: TV3 Malaysia, ABC-5 Philippines (2008)
- Release: February 7, 2007 – August 24, 2008

Gang Starz is a Malaysian-based reality singing competition that searches for the best vocal group in Southeast Asia. The winning group receives US$100,000, a recording contract, and a chance to expand their careers on a regional scale. The second season was the last season to date.

== Season 1 ==
Casting began with auditions in Malaysia, Indonesia, and Singapore, wherein 14 groups were selected (seven from Malaysia, five from Indonesia, and two from Singapore). Weekly eliminations were determined by 50% text votes and 50% judges' scores. The jury consisted of Vernon Kedit (talent manager), Maple Loo (choreographer), and Arab (songwriter). Although the competitors included those from other countries, the voting and broadcast was only available in Malaysia. The finale, however, was also shown in Indonesia's private television station TPI. The competition was won by The Lima, an all-male trio from Bandung, who received 33% of over 2.8 million votes.

The first season of Gang Starz was nominated for Best Entertainment Program in 2007 Asian Television Awards.

== Season 2 ==
The scope of competition was expanded with the inclusion of groups from Thailand and Philippines. It was confirmed that Gang Starz was expected to be shown in the Philippines in Summer 2008. Auditions were conducted.

== Grand prizes ==
The winner will receive US$100,000 (RM 330,000) cash.

== Champions ==
- 2007 - De Lima ( Indonesia)
- 2008 - One Nation Emcees ( Malaysia)

== GangStarz 2008 ==
=== Malaysia ===
- One Nation Emcess
- Akasia
- South Trio (out)

=== Singapore ===
- Cab Jackers Posse (CJP) (out)
- Supreme One (out)
- Faith (out)
- Brown Tone (out 15 June 2008)

=== Indonesia ===
- 3 Voices (out)
- D' Reborn (out)
- D' RAZ

=== Philippines ===
- Paragon Child (top 5 finalist)
- 3.5 (top 5 finalist)

=== Thailand ===
- PZG (out)
- STEP (out)
