= Alisa Mizuki discography =

- Studio albums: 6
- Compilation albums: 5
- Singles: 27
- Video albums: 3
- Music videos: 28

The discography of Japanese pop singer Alisa Mizuki consists of six studio albums, five compilation albums, twenty-seven singles, three video albums and twenty-eight music videos.

== Albums ==
=== Studio albums ===
Title	Album details	Peak chart positions	Sales
Arisa	Released: December 4, 1991; Label: Nippon Columbia; Formats: CD, cassette	8	123,980
Arisa II: Shake Your Body for Me	Released: October 1, 1992; Label: Nippon Columbia; Formats: CD, cassette	6	109,250
Arisa III: Look	Released: December 24, 1994; Label: Nippon Columbia; Formats: CD, cassette	24	66,870
Cute	Released: July 21, 1995; Label: Nippon Columbia; Formats: CD, cassette	21	52,890
Innocence	Released: November 17, 1999; Label: Avex Tune; Formats: CD, cassette	39	10,020
SpeciAlisa	Released: May 25, 2011; Label: Avex Tune; Formats: CD, digital download	72	2,306

=== Compilation albums ===
Title	Album details	Peak chart positions	Sales
Fiore	Released: October 1, 1993; Label: Nippon Columbia; Formats: CD, cassette	3	106,950
Kan-Juice	Released: April 1, 1994; Label: Nippon Columbia; Formats: CD, cassette	27	21,570
Arisa's Favorite: T.K. Songs	Released: November 27, 1996; Label: Nippon Columbia; Formats: CD, cassette	19	43,180
Fiore II	Released: December 20, 1997; Label: Nippon Columbia; Formats: CD, cassette	69	9,680
History: Alisa Mizuki Complete Single Collection	Released: March 10, 2004; Label: Avex Tune; Formats: CD	25	13,746

== Singles ==
List of singles, with selected chart positions and sales, showing year released and album name.
Title	Year	Peak chart positions	Sales		Album
Title	Year	Peak chart positions	Debut	Overall	Album
"Densetsu no Shōjo"	1991	5	58,150	227,340	Arisa
"Eden no Machi"	1991	5	59,830	181,420	Arisa
"Kaze no Naka de"	1991	10	49,740	121,870	Arisa
"Too Shy Shy Boy!"	1992	4	83,750	362,680	Arisa II: Shake Your Body for Me
"Kotoshi Ichiban Kaze no Tsuyoi Gogo"	1993	8	74,400	192,950	Fiore
"Kimi ga Suki Dakara"	1993	10	55,820	176,360	Fiore
"Happy Wake Up!"	1994	3	63,170	343,790	Arisa III: Look
"Anata no Sedai e Kuchizuke o"	1995	9	64,780	131,640	Cute
"Dakishimete!"	1995	20	52,150	96,140	Cute
"Don't Be Shy"	1995	39	13,250	30,340	Fiore II
"Kaze mo Sora mo Kitto..."	1996	24	14,130	27,530	Fiore II
"Promise to Promise"	1996	17	34,470	143,020	Fiore II
"Forever Love"	1997	35	11,600	21,710	Fiore II
"Days"	1997	14	28,020	101,120	Fiore II
"Through the Season"	1998	49	6,250	11,490	Innocence
"Oh Darling"	1998	23	8,790	106,970	Innocence
"Asahi no Ataru Hashi"	1999	33	9,480	18,540	Innocence
"Eternal Message"	1999	43	7,750	14,750	Innocence
"Break All Day!"	2000	20	14,690	46,150	History: Alisa Mizuki Complete Single Collection
"Megami no Mai"	2000	20	17,230	32,740	History: Alisa Mizuki Complete Single Collection
"Hitomi no Chikara"	2002	33	7,700	15,280	History: Alisa Mizuki Complete Single Collection
"Vacation"	2002	72	2,790	5,360	History: Alisa Mizuki Complete Single Collection
"Love Potion"	2002	30	7,260	13,490	History: Alisa Mizuki Complete Single Collection
"Shout It Out"	2003	96	1,897	3,158	History: Alisa Mizuki Complete Single Collection
"C'est la Vie"	2005	106	880	880	Non-album release
"Engaged"	2008	53	2,147	7,562	Non-album release
"Hoshi no Hate"	2011	117	577	577	SpeciAlisa

== Video albums ==
Title	Album details	Peak chart positions
Arisa Video Clips 1	Released: February 10, 1992; Label: Nippon Columbia; Formats: VHS	—
Real Alisa Video Clips 2	Released: July 23, 1997; Label: Nippon Columbia; Formats: VHS	—
History: Alisa Mizuki Single Clip Collection	Released: March 9, 2005; Label: Avex Tune; Formats: DVD	154
"—" denotes items that did not chart or missing information.
