= History: Alisa Mizuki Complete Single Collection =

Greatest hits album by Alisa Mizuki
- Released: March 10, 2004
- Recorded: 1991–2004
- Genre: Pop, dance
- Length: 115:45
- Label: Avex Tune
- Producer: Matt Cooper, Dance Man, Hiroaki Hayama, Takayuki Hijikata, Yasuhiko Hoshino, Mitsuru Igarashi, Hiromasa Ijichi, Akira Inoue, Tetsuya Komuro, Takao Konishi, Jean-Paul 'Bluey' Maunick, Yasuhisa Murase, Yasuharu Ogura, Kaori Okui, Masaaki Ōmura, Hiroyuki Ōtsuki, Masanori Sasaji, Jun Satō, Tsunku, Keiichi Ueno

Alisa Mizuki chronology
Fiore II (1997)	History: Alisa Mizuki Complete Single Collection (2004)

Singles from History: Alisa Mizuki Complete Single Collection
- 1. "Break All Day!" Released: May 10, 2000; 2. "Megami no Mai" Released: August 23, 2000; 3. "Hitomi no Chikara" Released: February 6, 2002; 4. "Vacation" Released: April 24, 2002; 5. "Love Potion" Released: August 21, 2002; 6. "Shout It Out" Released: May 21, 2003

History: Alisa Mizuki Complete Single Collection is the fourth compilation album by Japanese recording artist Alisa Mizuki, released through Avex Tune on March 10, 2004. The dual-disc set comprises all of Mizuki's singles, from 1991 to 2004, as well as the two singles released under different aliases. The album included one new track, "Sky," produced by Incognito's Jean-Paul 'Bluey' Maunick. The lyrics to "Sky" were written by Mizuki herself, making it the first song she wrote by herself entirely. History: Alisa Mizuki Complete Single Collection yielded six original singles, "Break All Day!," "Megami no Mai," "Hitomi no Chikara," "Vacation," "Love Potion" and "Shout It Out," released in a span of four years.

Disc one includes all the singles released through Nippon Columbia, while disc two contains all of Mizuki's singles released through Avex Tune. "Oh Darling" and "Vacation" were included on disc two as bonus tracks. An A6-size reprint of the first issue of Mizuki's fanclub bulletin, Lovers Magazine, as well as liner notes were included with the release. The first pressing of the compilation included an entry form to win tickets to a premium Alisa Mizuki concert.

History: Alisa Mizuki Complete Single Collection debuted at number 25 on the Oricon Weekly Albums chart with 8,527 copies in its first week, making it Mizuki's first album in over seven years to enter the top thirty, since Arisa's Favorite: T.K. Songs, as well as being her last to do so.

History: Alisa Mizuki Complete Single Collection is Mizuki's first and only album to be issued in CCCD format.

== Commercial performance ==
History: Alisa Mizuki Complete Single Collection debuted on the Oricon Weekly Albums chart at number 25 with 8,527 copies sold in its first week. The album charted for four weeks and has sold a total of 13,746 copies.

== Track listing ==
Disc one
No.	Title	Lyrics	Music	Length
1.	"Densetsu no Shōjo"	Amii Ozaki	Ozaki	5:02
2.	"Eden no Machi"	Jun Taguchi	Kaori Okui	3:57
3.	"Kaze no Naka de"	Ozaki	Ozaki	5:33
4.	"Too Shy Shy Boy!"	Tetsuya Komuro	Komuro	4:58
5.	"Kotoshi Ichiban Kaze no Tsuyoi Gogo"	Karuho Kureta	Kureta	4:50
6.	"Kimi ga Suki Dakara"	Taguchi	Kureta	5:14
7.	"Happy Wake Up!"	Komuro	Komuro	4:38
8.	"Anata no Sedai e Kuchizuke o"	Komuro	Komuro	5:31
9.	"Dakishimete!"	Masanori Nagaoka	Yasuhiko Hoshino	5:09
10.	"Don't Be Shy"	Yūho Iwasato	F&M Project	3:47
11.	"Kaze mo Sora mo Kitto..."	Chika Ueda	Ueda	4:46
12.	"Promise to Promise"	Komuro, Takahiro Maeda	Komuro	4:25
13.	"Forever Love"	Hiromasa Ijichi	Ijichi	4:18
Total length:				60:08

Disc two
No.	Title	Lyrics	Music	Length
1.	"Days"	Mitsuru Igarashi	Igarashi	4:10
2.	"Through the Season"	Yūko Ebine	Hiroaki Hayama	4:43
3.	"Asahi no Ataru Hashi"	Hiromi Mori	T2ya	4:46
4.	"Eternal Message"	Ebine	Hayama	4:08
5.	"Break All Day!"	Kenzō Saeki, Cathy Dennis, Hallgeir Rustan, Tor Erik Hermansen, Mikkel Eriksen	Dennis, Rustan, Hermansen, Eriksen	4:28
6.	"Megami no Mai"	Tsunku	Tsunku	4:22
7.	"Hitomi no Chikara"	Mori	Toshihiko Takamizawa	4:30
8.	"Love Potion"	Takeshi Aida, Steve Kipner, David Frank, Pamela Sheyne	Kipner, Frank, Sheyne	4:14
9.	"Shout It Out"	Gorō Matsui	Jean-Paul 'Bluey' Maunick, Matt Cooper	4:38
10.	"Oh Darling" (Bonus track)	Komuro, Marc	Komuro	6:19
11.	"Vacation" (Bonus track)	Kenji Sazanami, Connie Francis, Hank Hunter, Gary Weston	Francis, Hunter, Weston	2:52
12.	"Sky" (Bonus track)	Alisa Mizuki	Maunick, Gary Sanctuary	4:27
Total length:				55:37

== Charts and sales ==
Chart (2004)	Peak position	Sales
Oricon Weekly Albums	25	13,746
