= Fiore (album) =

Greatest hits album by Arisa Mizuki
- Released: October 1, 1993
- Recorded: 1991–93
- Genre: Pop, dance
- Length: 55:25
- Label: Nippon Columbia
- Producer: Akira Inoue, Tetsuya Komuro, Seiichi Kyōda, Yasuhisa Murase, Yasuharu Ogura, Kaori Okui, Masaaki Ōmura, Masanori Sasaji, Jun Satō, Johny Taira (exec.)

Arisa Mizuki chronology
Fiore (1993)	Kan-Juice (1994)

Singles from Fiore
- 1. "Kotoshi Ichiban Kaze no Tsuyoi Gogo" Released: May 12, 1993; 2. "Kimi ga Suki Dakara" Released: August 11, 1993

Fiore is the first compilation album by Japanese recording artist Arisa Mizuki, released through Nippon Columbia on October 1, 1993. The eleven-track set features a selection of songs from Mizuki's first two studio albums, Arisa and Arisa II: Shake Your Body for Me, as well as two original songs. It is Mizuki's first album to include the original versions of both "Densetsu no Shōjo" (1991) and "Too Shy Shy Boy!" (1992).

Leading up to the compilation's release, the record's two original songs, "Kotoshi Ichiban Kaze no Tsuyoi Gogo" and "Kimi ga Suki Dakara," were released as singles. Both songs, which were produced by singer-songwriter Yumi Matsutoya (credited as Karuho Kureta), were top ten hits, selling over 190,000 copies and 170,000 copies, respectively.

Fiore debuted at number 3 on the Oricon Weekly Albums chart with 41,010 copies in its first week, becoming Mizuki's highest charting album.

== Commercial performance ==
Fiore debuted on the Oricon Weekly Albums chart at number 3 with 41,010 copies sold in its first week. It spent a second week in the top twenty at number 12, selling 20,270 copies. On its third week, the album fell one spot to number 13 with 13,270 copies sold. The following week, the album dropped out of the top twenty, to number 24, selling 10,840 copies. The album charted for seven weeks and has sold a total of 106,950 copies.

== Track listing ==
No.	Title	Lyrics	Music	Length
1.	"Kimi ga Suki Dakara"	Jun Taguchi	Karuho Kureta	5:59
2.	"Kotoshi Ichiban Kaze no Tsuyoi Gogo"	Karuho Kureta	Kureta	4:51
3.	"Too Shy Shy Boy!"	Tetsuya Komuro	Komuro	4:59
4.	"Shake Your Body for Me"	Komuro	Komuro	5:30
5.	"Kaze no Naka de"	Amii Ozaki	Ozaki	5:33
6.	"Wilders" (WILD･ERS -ワイルダーズ- Wilders (Wairudāzu))	Yumi Yoshimoto	Anri	4:08
7.	"Haru no Tobira" (春のとびら "Spring Gate")	Midori Karashima	Karashima	4:49
8.	"Cherry Cherry Strawberry"	Minoru Komorita	Komorita	4:29
9.	"Eden no Machi"	Jun Taguchi	Kaori Okui	3:56
10.	"Generation"	Komuro	Komuro	5:35
11.	"Densetsu no Shōjo"	Ozaki	Ozaki	5:00
Total length:				55:25

== Charts and sales ==
Chart (1993)	Peak position	Sales
Oricon Weekly Albums	3	106,950
