= Fiore II =

Greatest hits album by Alisa Mizuki
- Released: December 20, 1997
- Recorded: 1994–97
- Genre: Pop, dance
- Length: 62:02
- Label: Nippon Columbia
- Producer: Takayuki Hijikata, Yasuhiko Hoshino, Mitsuru Igarashi, Hiromasa Ijichi, Royal Mirrorball Tetsuya Komuro, Takao Konishi, Yasuharu Konishi, Alisa Mizuki (exec.), Yasuhiro Ogura, Hiroyuki Ōtsuki, Johny Taira (exec.)

Alisa Mizuki chronology
Arisa's Favorite: T.K. Songs (1996)	Fiore II (1997)	History: Alisa Mizuki Complete Single Collection (2004)

Singles from Fiore II
- 1. "Don't Be Shy" Released: December 1, 1995; 2. "Kaze mo Sora mo Kitto..." Released: April 20, 1996; 3. "Promise to Promise" Released: July 24, 1996; 4. "Forever Love" Released: April 23, 1997; 5. "Days" Released: November 19, 1997

Fiore II is the third compilation album by Japanese recording artist Alisa Mizuki, released through Nippon Columbia on December 20, 1997. The thirteen-track set features a selection of songs from Mizuki's third and fourth studio albums, Arisa III: Look and Cute, chosen by Mizuki herself, as well as five original songs. Fiore II is Mizuki's last album released under Nippon Columbia. The album is also Mizuki's first to credit her as Alisa Mizuki, rather than Arisa Mizuki.

Leading up to the compilation's release, the five original tracks, "Don't Be Shy," "Kaze mo Sora mo Kitto...," "Promise to Promise," "Forever Love," and "Days," were released as singles. Fiore II is Mizuki's first album to include the "Straight Run" version of "Promise to Promise," which was not included on Mizuki's previous compilation album Arisa's Favorite: T.K. Songs (a remix version was included instead). "Days" was released as the final single from the compilation as well as the first single from Mizuki's fifth studio album Innocence.

Fiore debuted at number 69 on the Oricon Weekly Albums chart with 3,870 copies in its first week, becoming Mizuki's second lowest charting album.

== Commercial performance ==
Fiore debuted on the Oricon Weekly Albums chart at number 69 with 3,870 copies sold in its first week. The album charted for three weeks and has sold a total of 9,680 copies.

== Track listing ==
No.	Title	Lyrics	Music	{{{extra_column}}}	Length
1.	"Days"	Mitsuru Igarashi	Igarashi	Igarashi	4:09
2.	"Forever Love"	Hiromasa Ijichi	Ijichi		4:17
3.	"Paris no Koibito / Tokyo no Koibito" (パリの恋人／トーキョーの恋人 Pari no Koibito / Tōkyō no Koibito "Paris Lover / Tokyo Lover")	Yasuharu Konishi	Konishi		4:12
4.	"Close to You"	Tetsuya Komuro	Komuro		5:38
5.	"Pitter Patter"	Royal Mirrorball	Royal Mirrorball		5:14
6.	"Dakishimete!"	Masanori Nagaoka	Yasuhiko Hoshino		5:06
7.	"Kaze mo Sora mo Kitto..."	Chika Ueda	Ueda		4:45
8.	"Anata no Sedai e Kuchizuke o"	Komuro	Komuro		5:35
9.	"In the Rain"	Ueda	Ueda		5:36
10.	"Happy Wake Up!"	Komuro	Komuro		4:43
11.	"Don't Be Shy"	Yūho Iwasato	F&M Project		3:45
12.	"Sayonara no Okurimono" (さよならの贈りもの "The Gift of Goodbye")	Yumi Yoshimoto	Anri		4:39
13.	"Promise to Promise (Straight Run)"	Komuro, Takahiro Maeda	Komuro		4:23
Total length:					62:02

== Charts and sales ==
Chart (1997)	Peak position	Sales
Oricon Weekly Albums	69	9,680
