= Kan-Juice =

Remix album by Arisa Mizuki
- Released: April 1, 1994
- Recorded: 1991–93
- Genre: Pop, dance, house, R&B, trance
- Length: 44:44
- Label: Nippon Columbia
- Producer: Hirofumi Asamoto, Yukihiro Fukutomi, Yasuharu Konishi, Izumi "DMX" Miyazaki, Ayumi Obinata, Johny Taira (exec.)

Arisa Mizuki chronology
Fiore: Arisa Collection (1993)	Kan-Juice (1994)	Arisa's Favorite: T.K. Songs (1996)

Kan-Juice is a remix album by Japanese recording artist Arisa Mizuki, released through Nippon Columbia on April 1, 1994. The album features a selection of seven songs from Mizuki's first two studio albums, Arisa and Arisa II: Shake Your Body for Me, remixed by famous Japanese DJs and musicians, including former Pizzicato Five frontman Yasuharu Konishi.

Kan-Juice debuted at number 27 on the Oricon Weekly Albums chart with 9,570 copies in its first week, becoming Mizuki's first album to peak outside the top twenty.

== Commercial performance ==
Kan-Juice debuted on the Oricon Weekly Albums chart at number 27 with 9,570 copies sold in its first week. The album charted for three weeks and has sold a total of 21,570 copies.

== Track listing ==
No.	Title	Remixer(s)	Length
1.	"Too Shy Shy Boy! (The Readymade Catchy Mix)"	Yasuharu Konishi	7:20
2.	"He's Gone (Super Charged Hyper Trance Mix)"	Izumi "DMX" Miyazaki, Hirofumi Asamoto	7:36
3.	"Kotoshi Ichiban Kaze no Tsuyoi Gogo (Dub's Dub Mix)"	Miyazaki, Asamoto	7:22
4.	"Kimi ga Suki Dakara (Talking Toolbox Mix)"	Yukihiro Fukutomi	6:44
5.	"Luna (R&B Mix)" (月)	Ayumi Obinata	3:37
6.	"Cherry Cherry Strawberry (Obi-One Super House Mix)"	Obinata	5:33
7.	"Densetsu no Shōjo (The Legendary Readymade Mix)"	Konishi	6:32
Total length:			44:44

== Charts and sales ==
Chart (1994)	Peak position	Sales
Oricon Weekly Albums	27	21,570
