= SpeciAlisa =

Studio album by Alisa Mizuki
- Released: May 25, 2011
- Recorded: 2011
- Genre: Pop
- Length: 57:08
- Label: Avex Tune
- Producer: Jun Asahi, Curly Giraffe, Jin, Masato Kamata, Tetsuya Komuro, Lecca, Micro, Masato Nakamura, Yasunori Ohashi, Tatsuyuki Okawa, Amii Ozaki, Isao Takao, Tasuku, Uta

Alisa Mizuki chronology
Innocence (1999)	SpeciAlisa (2011)

Singles from SpeciAlisa
- 1. "Hoshi no Hate" Released: August 17, 2011

SpeciAlisa is the sixth studio album by Japanese recording artist Alisa Mizuki, released through Avex Tune on May 25, 2011. It is Mizuki's second studio album with Avex and first in twelve years, since Innocence (1999). The title is a portmanteau of the words "special" and "Alisa." The album was released in commemoration of Mizuki's twenty-year anniversary.

== Background ==
Mizuki began planning the release of her sixth studio album in 2010. The theme for the album being bonds, Mizuki invited her musician friends and favorite artists to collaborate with her on the record. Miwa Yoshida and Masato Nakamura of Dreams Come True, whose music has in the past been used in movies and commercials starring Mizuki, wrote "Anata ga Waraeba," one of the album's lead tracks. Nakamura commented, "we wanted the song to have that obvious DoriKamu sound that even we haven't done in a while." Frequent collaborator Tetsuya Komuro, who wrote Mizuki's greatest hit "Too Shy Shy Boy!," and Amii Ozaki, who penned Mizuki's debut single "Densetsu no Shōjo," also composed songs for the album.

SpeciAlisa also features collaborations with High Speed Boyz vocalist Jin, Bonnie Pink, Yuka Kawamura, former Princess Princess vocalist Kaori Kishitani, Show Ayanocozey (DJ OZMA) from Kishidan, Wise, Tarantula from Spontania, Lecca, rapper 369, Micro from Def Tech, Kyōko Koizumi, and Ohashi Trio. Kawamura's contribution, "Hoshi no Hate," which served as theme song for the TBS drama Hanawake no Yon-shimai, starring Mizuki herself, was released as the album's sole single on August 17, 2011.

In a press release issued in April 2011, Mizuki spoke about the album's completion:

I am able to celebrate my twentieth anniversary as a singer with these amazing songs I have been given. I recorded these songs while feeling all the love that was put into them. This album is indeed a special one, as it comprises many different genres. With this record, you will be able to enjoy both the old and the new Alisa.

== Release and promotion ==
Mizuki filmed two music videos for the songs "Alisa in Wonderland" and "Will Love" to promote the album. She performed the lead tracks of the album on several TV programs, including Hey! Hey! Hey!, Coming Soon!!, and Music Japan. She also appeared on NTV's Music Lovers, where she performed a mini-concert for the audience.

Mizuki held her first formal live concert in nearly seven years to commemorate her twenty-year anniversary. The concert was held at Shibuya Eggman in Tokyo on May 15, the release date of Mizuki's "Densetsu no Shōjo." Mizuki performed a five-song set for 3,000 fans and held a special handshake event afterwards for 50 fans selected through random lottery. On performing her debut song, on which she was accompanied by Amii Ozaki, Mizuki commented, "It's been twenty years and I'm thrilled. I'm glad I grew up to be a 'legendary woman'."

Mizuki held a second concert on June 5, this time to commemorate the release of the album. She performed eleven songs, including her past hits "Too Shy Shy Boy!," "Eden no Machi," and "Happy Wake Up!," as well as songs from SpeciAlisa. Ozaki was once again in attendance and joined Mizuki for the performances of "Densetsu no Shōjo" and "Jewel." Other special guests included, Wise, Tarantula (Spontania), 369, and Micro (Def Tech). At the end of the concert Mizuki commented, "to be able to perform these songs with the people that helped create them is a pleasure," and expressed her gratification for the past two decades.

== Commercial performance ==
SpeciAlisa debuted at number 46 on the Oricon Daily Albums chart on May 24, 2011. It peaked at number 72 on the Oricon Weekly Albums Chart with 1,617 copies in its first week. The album charted for two weeks and has sold a total of 2,306 copies.

== Track listing ==
No.	Title	Lyrics	Music	Length
1.	"Anata ga Waraeba" (あなたが笑えば "If You Smile")	Miwa Yoshida	Masato Nakamura	4:32
2.	"Don't Stop Now"	Tetsuya Komuro	Komuro	4:32
3.	"Heroines!"	Kanata Nakamura	Charlie Mason, Frida Molander, Christian Rabb	3:15
4.	"You're My Best Friend"	Bonnie Pink	Pink	3:56
5.	"Hoshi no Hate"	Yuka Kawamura	Kawamura	3:58
6.	"Watashi" (わたし "I")	Kaori Kishitani	Kishitani	3:25
7.	"Jewel"	Amii Ozaki	Ozaki	4:18
8.	"I Don't Mind, If You Forget Me"	Show Ayanocozey	Ayanocozey	4:34
9.	"To Your Heart featuring Wise and Tarantula from Spontania"	Wise, Tarantula, NaNa Music	Uta, Wise, Tarantula	4:48
10.	"Will Love"	Lecca	Lecca	5:29
11.	"Lyra featuring 369"	369	Tasuku	4:32
12.	"Alisa in Wonderland"	Micro, Alisa Mizuki, Mamamarock	Micro	4:50
13.	"Watashi wa Nakanai" (私は泣かない "I Won't Cry")	Kyōko Koizumi	Yasunori Ohashi	4:54
Total length:				57:08

== Charts ==
Chart (2011)	Peak position
Billboard Japan Top Albums	72
Oricon Daily Albums	46
Oricon Weekly Albums	72
