= Arisa's Favorite: T.K. Songs =

Greatest hits album by Arisa Mizuki
- Released: November 27, 1996
- Recorded: 1991–96
- Genre: Pop, dance
- Length: 63:28
- Label: Nippon Columbia
- Producer: Tetsuya Komuro, Johny Taira (exec.)

Arisa Mizuki chronology
Kan-Juice (1994)	Arisa's Favorite: T.K. Songs (1996)	Fiore II (1997)

Arisa's Favorite: T.K. Songs is the second compilation album by Japanese recording artist Arisa Mizuki, released through Nippon Columbia on November 27, 1996. The twelve-track set is a collection of songs written and produced by Tetsuya Komuro, selected from Mizuki's past albums and singles. The compilation is Mizuki's last album on which she is credited as Arisa Mizuki.

The Komuro-produced "Promise to Promise," which was released four months prior to the compilation was included on the album in the form of a remix. The original version, which peaked at number 17 on the Oricon Weekly Singles chart, selling over 140,000 copies and becoming Mizuki's first single to enter the top twenty since "Dakishimete!" (1995), was later included on Mizuki's third compilation album Fiore II.

CDJournal described the Arisa's Favorite: T.K. Songs as an album that "traces the growth of Mizuki and the evolution of Komuro's sound." The compilation debuted at number 19 on the Oricon Weekly Albums chart with 21,950 copies in its first week, becoming her first album in three years to debut in the top twenty, since Fiore, and overall fourth and last album to do so.

== Commercial performance ==
Arisa's Favorite: T.K. Songs debuted on the Oricon Weekly Albums chart at number 19 with 21,950 copies sold in its first week. The album fell eleven spots to number 30 on its second week, selling 10,130 copies, before dropping out of the top thirty the following week. The album charted for four weeks and has sold a total of 43,180 copies.

== Track listing ==
All tracks are written by Tetsuya Komuro except track one, which is written by Mitsuko Komuro, track nine, which is written by Takahiro Maeda, track eleven, which is composed by Cozy Kubo, and track twelve which is co-written by Maeda

No.	Title	Length
1.	"Yume Dake no Boyfriend" (夢だけのボーイフレンド Yume Dake no Bōifurendo "Boyfriend In My Dreams Only")	4:20
2.	"Too Shy Shy Boy! (Favorite Edition)"	4:57
3.	"Give Me Your Love Tonight (Favorite Edition)"	5:51
4.	"Shake Your Body for Me (Favorite Edition)"	5:29
5.	"He's Gone"	4:28
6.	"Generation"	5:40
7.	"Happy Wake Up!"	4:42
8.	"Close to You"	6:15
9.	"Cry for You"	6:12
10.	"Anata no Sedai e Kuchizuke o"	5:35
11.	"Aru Hi, Aru Asa, Koibito wa" (ある日 ある朝 恋人は "One Day, One Morning, My Lover Was")	5:25
12.	"Promise to Promise (Urban Street Mix)"	4:34
Total length:		63:28

== Charts and sales ==
Chart (1996)	Peak position	Sales
Oricon Weekly Albums	19	43,180
