= Engaged (song) =

Single by Alisa Mizuki
- Released: February 6, 2008
- Genre: Pop
- Length: 5:16
- Label: Avex Tune
- Songwriters: Jun Takigawa, Alisa Mizuki
- Producer: Jun Asahi

Alisa Mizuki singles chronology
"C'est la Vie" (2005)	"Engaged" (2008)	"Hoshi no Hate" (2011)

Alternative cover
- Cover artwork for the CD+DVD edition

"Engaged" is the twenty-third single by Japanese recording artist Alisa Mizuki. It was released on February 6, 2008, nearly two years and a half since "C'est la Vie" (2005) and five years since her last solo single "Shout It Out" (2003). The single was issued in two formats: CD+DVD edition and CD-only edition.

The title track was written and composed by Jun Takigawa (瀧川潤) and served as theme song for the NTV drama Saitō-san, starring Mizuki herself. CDJournal described "Engaged" as a "captivating ballad" and praised the intensity and emotion of Mizuki's vocal delivery. The B-side, "Anemone," was also produced by Takigawa but written by Mizuki, marking her first foray into songwriting since the song "Sky" from Mizuki's fourth compilation album History: Alisa Mizuki Complete Single Collection (2004).

== Chart performance ==
"Engaged" debuted on the Oricon Daily Singles chart at number 43 on February 5, 2008 and climbed to number 40 on February 9, 2008. It peaked at number 53 on the Oricon Weekly Singles chart with 2,147 copies sold in its first week. The single charted for eight weeks and has sold a total of 7,562 copies.

== Track listing ==
All music is composed by Jun Takigawa.

No.	Title	Lyrics	Arranger(s)	Length
1.	"Engaged"	Jun Takigawa	Jun Asahi	5:16
2.	"Anemone" (アネモネ)	Alisa Mizuki	Asahi	5:31
3.	"Engaged (Piano Version)"	Takigawa	Asahi	5:15
4.	"Engaged (Instrumental)"		Asahi	5:16
5.	"Anemone (Instrumental)"		Asahi	5:32
Total length:				26:50

DVD
No.	Title	Length
1.	"Engaged (Video Clip)"
2.	"Making of 'Engaged'"

== Charts ==
Chart (2008)	Peak position
Oricon Daily Singles	40
Oricon Weekly Singles	53
Oricon Yearly Singles	688
