= Break All Day! =

2000 single by Alisa Mizuki

Single by Alisa Mizuki

from the album History: Alisa Mizuki Complete Single Collection
- Released: May 10, 2000
- Genre: Pop
- Length: 4:27
- Label: Avex Tune
- Songwriters: Kenzō Saeki, Cathy Dennis, Hallgeir Rustan, Tor Erik Hermansen, Mikkel Eriksen
- Producer: Dance Man

Alisa Mizuki singles chronology
"Eternal Message" (1999)	"Break All Day!" (2000)	"Megami no Mai" (2000)

"Break All Day!" is the eighteenth single by Japanese recording artist Alisa Mizuki. It was released on May 10, 2000, as the first single from Mizuki's fourth compilation album History: Alisa Mizuki Complete Single Collection.

The title track is a Japanese-language cover of "Viva la Fiesta" by S Club 7, from their debut studio album S Club. It was written by Cathy Dennis and Stargate members Hallgeir Rustan, Tor Erik hermansen and Mikkel Eriksen, while the Japanese lyrics were written by Kenzō Saeki. The cover was produced by Hideki Fujisawa, credited as Dance Man. The song served as theme song for the first half (episodes 1–14) of the third season of the Fuji TV drama Nurse no Oshigoto, which stars Mizuki in the lead role. The B-side, "Shake Love," was written by Kentarō Akutsu and composed and produced by Tourbillon keyboardist Hiroaki Hayama.

"Break All Day!" is Mizuki's first single to be released in maxi single (12 cm CD) format.

== Chart performance ==
"Break All Day!" debuted on the Oricon Weekly Singles chart at number 20 with 14,690 copies sold in its first week. The single charted for eight weeks and has sold a total of 46,150 copies.

== Track listing ==
No.	Title	Lyrics	Music	Arranger(s)	Length
1.	"Break All Day!"	Kenzō Saeki, Cathy Dennis, Hallgeir Rustan, Tor Erik Hermansen, Mikkel Eriksen	Dennis, Rustan, Hermansen, Eriksen	Dance Man	4:27
2.	"Shake Love"	Kentarō Akutsu	Hiroaki Hayama	Hayama	4:08
3.	"Break All Day! (G.O.N.T.A 2000 Mix)"		Dennis, Rustan, Hermansen, Eriksen	Takao Konishi	4:47
4.	"Break All Day! (Instrumental)"		Dennis, Rustan, Hermansen, Eriksen	Dance Man	4:27
5.	"Shake Love (Instrumental)"		Hayama	Hayama	4:08
Total length:					22:00

== Charts and sales ==
Chart (2000)	Peak position	Sales
Oricon Weekly Singles	20	46,150
