= Mieko Hirota =

Japanese singer (1947–2020)

Mieko Hirota 弘田 三枝子
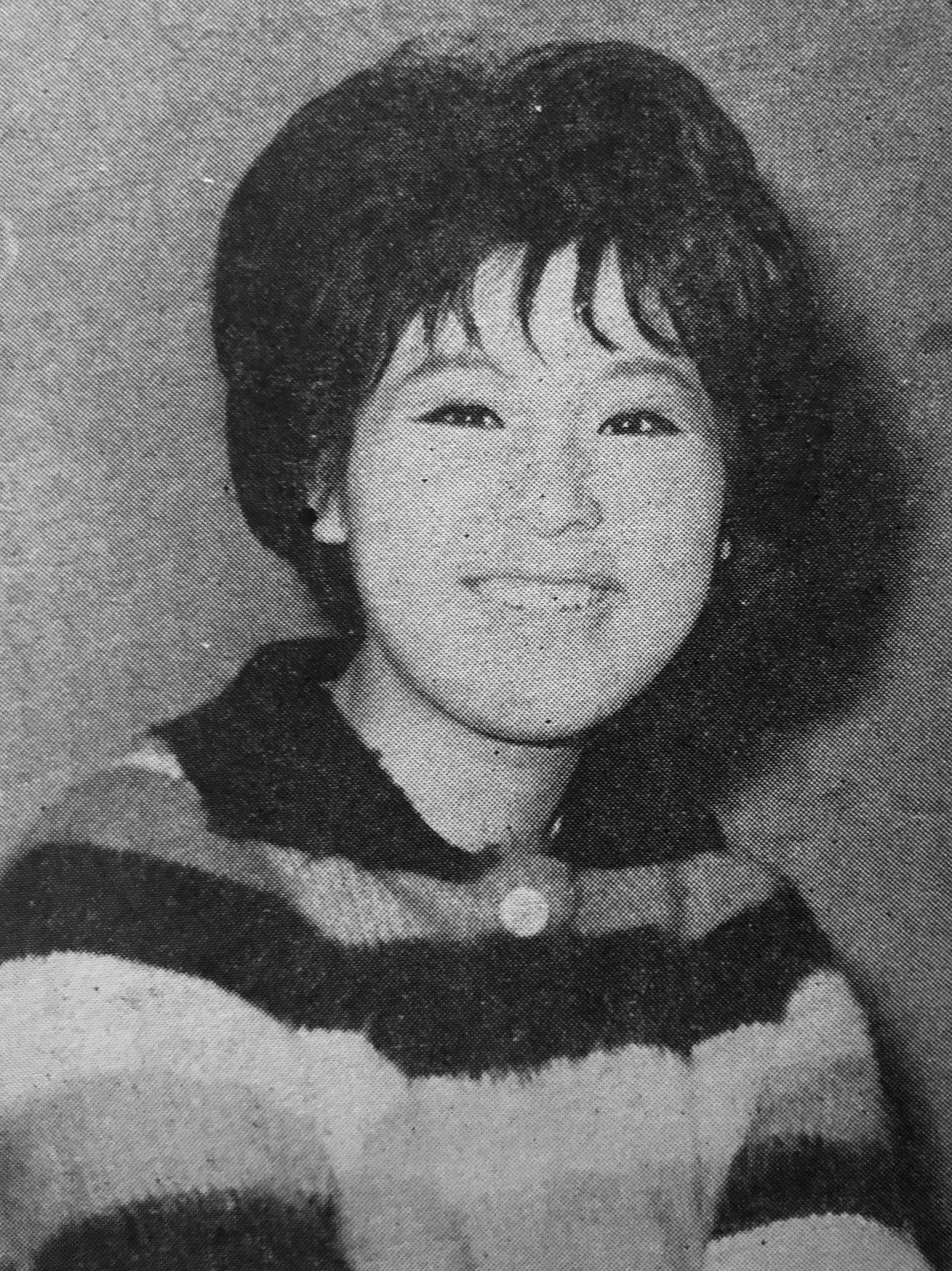
- Hirota in 1966

Background information
- Also known as: Mico (ミコ)
- Born: Mieko Takenaga 竹永 三枝子; February 5, 1947; Ikejiri, Setagaya, Japan
- Died: July 21, 2020 (aged 73) Chiba Prefecture, Japan
- Genres: Pop; jazz; kayōkyoku; R&B
- Instrument: Vocals
- Years active: 1961–2020
- Labels: EMI Music Japan; Nippon Columbia; King Records

Mieko Hirota (弘田 三枝子, Hirota Mieko; née Takenaga, 竹永; February 5, 1947 – July 21, 2020) was a Japanese singer. Her nickname was Mico (ミコ; also spelled Miko).

Hirota was born in Ikejiri, Setagaya, Tokyo. She grew up listening to pop and jazz in places like Tachikawa, which was frequented by occupation troops. She made her debut in 1961 at age 14. In 1965, she became the first Japanese singer to sing the song "Sunny" on an album and the first to appear at the Newport Jazz Festival.

Hirota appeared on the NHK New Year's Eve Kōhaku Uta Gassen eight times. Her first performance was in 1962, when she sang the Connie Francis tune "Vacation". NHK tapped her for the next four years in succession, and again in 1969, 1970, and 1971. She sang the theme song, "Leo no Uta", for the animated television series Kimba the White Lion.

Hirota's commercial career included endorsements for Nescafé, Nippon Oil, Daikin Industries, Fujiya, Renown, and Sapporo Beer.

Hirota collapsed at her home in Chiba Prefecture on July 20, 2020, and was taken to a nearby hospital. She died from heart failure on July 21, 2020, at the age of 73. She posthumously became one of eight recipients of the Special Lifetime Achievement Award at the 62nd Japan Record Awards.

== Kōhaku Uta Gassen appearances ==
Number	Year	Song	Appearance order	Opponent	Remarks
13	1962	ヴァケーション (Vacation)	3/25	Hisahiko Iida	Kōhaku debut, youngest record in Red team (15 years)
14	1963	悲しきハート (Kanashiki Heart, "Sad Heart/Lock Your Heart Away")	1/25	Yasuo Tanabe	Grand Top Batter
15	1964	アレキサンダーズ・ラグタイム・バンド (Alexander's Ragtime Band)	16/25	Hitoshi Ueki	
16	1965	恋のクンビア (Koi No Cumbia, "Cumbia Of Love")	14/25	Johnnys	
18	1967	渚のうわさ (Nagisa No Uwasa, "Rumor In Beach/End Of Summer")	17/23	Satake Barb	Returned after 2 years
20	1969	人形の家 (Ningyou No Ie, "The House Of Dolls")	13/23	Yukio Hashi	Returned after 2 years, second half top batter
21	1970	ロダンの肖像 (Rodan No Shōzō, "Portrait Of Rodin/Portrait Of Love")	8/24	Kenichi Mikawa	
22	1971	バラの革命 (Bara No Kakumei, "Revolution Of Roses/Rose And Blood")	22/25	Akira Fuse	

== Sources ==
This article incorporates material from 弘田三枝子 (Hirota Mieko) in the Japanese Wikipedia, retrieved on February 10, 2008.
