= Marina Rei =

Italian singer and songwriter

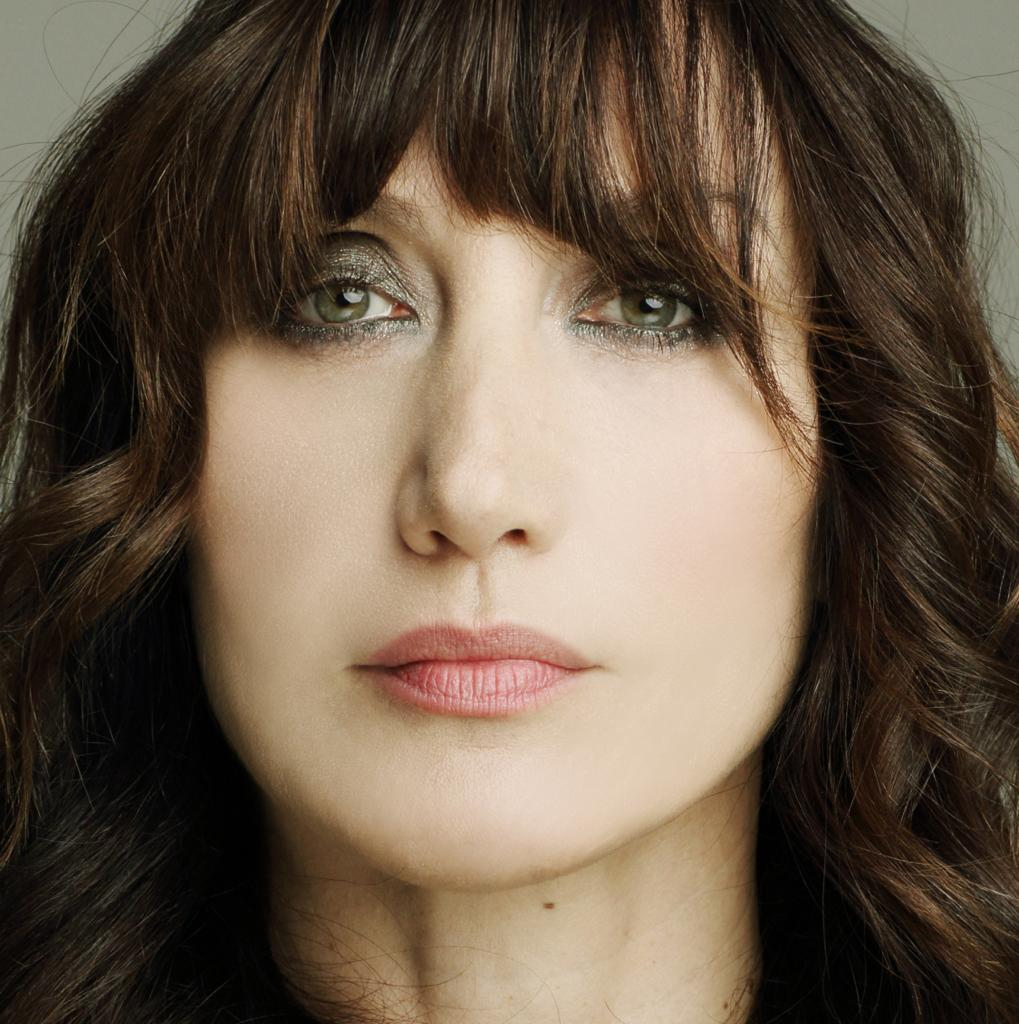

Background information
- Born: Marina Restuccia; 5 June 1969 (age 57)
- Origin: Rome, Italy
- Genres: Dance-pop, soul, pop rock
- Occupation: Singer
- Years active: 1991–present

Marina Restuccia (born 5 June 1969), known as Marina Rei, is an Italian singer and songwriter.

== Biography ==
Born in Rome, the daughter of the drummer of the orchestra of Ennio Morricone and turnist Vincenzo "Enzo" Restuccia, at 18 Rei started to dedicate herself to live music, performing in some of the best known Roman clubs. At the time she also appeared as backing vocalist and dancer in several television shows of RAI and Canale 5.

In 1991, Rei began to record dance songs under the name of Jamie Dee. In 1995 she adopted her actual stage name and released "Sola" and "Noi", that marked a change on her style and that were fairly successful. In 1996, she took part at the Sanremo Music Festival with the song "Al di là di questi anni" (later published in English with the title Because of you), ranking third in the category "Nuove proposte" and also winning the ″Mia Martini″ Critics Award. She later come back to the Festival in 1997, 1999, 2005 and 2008. In 1997 she won the Un disco per l'estate competition with the song "Primavera", a cover of The Real Thing's You to Me Are Everything. In 2004, she was nominated at Silver Ribbon for best original song for the song "And I Close My Eyes", included in the film Fino a farti male.

On 14 January 2020, 'Per essere felici' is released, a track anticipating the new album of the same name, originally scheduled for 17 April and later postponed to 26 June.

== Discography ==
=== Albums ===
- Different moods (1992, as Jamie Dee)
- Don't be shy (1994, as Jamie Dee)
- Marina Rei (1995)
- Donna (1997)
- Anime belle (1998)
- Inaspettatamente (2000)
- L'incantevole abitudine (2002)
- Colpisci (2005)
- Al di là di questi anni (2007)
- Musa (2009)
- La conseguenza naturale dell'errore (2012)
- Pareidolia (2014)
- Per essere felici (2020)

=== Singles ===
==== As Jamie Dee ====
- Burnin' up (1991)
- Memories memories (1991)
- Two time baby (1992)
- Special love (1993)
- Get ready (1993)
- Don't be shy (1994)
- People (everybody needs love) (1994)
- So good (1995)
- Dreaming blue (1995)
- U (1996)

==== As Marina Rei ====
- Sola (1995)
- Noi (1995)
- Al di là di questi anni (1996)
- Pazza di te (1996)
- I sogni dell'anima (1996)
- Odio e amore (1996)
- Dentro me (1997)
- Donna (1997)
- Primavera (1997)
- T'innamorerò (1998)
- Cuore a metà (1998)
- Un inverno da baciare (1999)
- Scusa (1999)
- L'allucinazione (1999)
- Inaspettatamente (2000)
- I miei complimenti (2000)
- Maestri sull'altare (2001)
- Il giorno della mia festa (2002)
- La parte migliore di me (2003)
- Verrà il tempo (2002)
- Fammi entrare (2005)
- Song'je (2005)
- Colpisci (2005)
- Le stelle (2005)
- I miei complimenti (2007)
- Musa (2009)
- Sorrido (2009)
- E mi parli di te feat. Pierpaolo Capovilla (2012)
- Lasciarsi andare (2014)
- Ho visto una stella cadere (2014)
- Portami a ballare (2016)
- Per essere felici (2020)
- Comunque tu (2020)
- Dimenticarci (2020)
- Bellissimo (2020)
