= Oh Darling (song) =

Single by Convertible

from the album Innocence
- Released: July 8, 1998
- Genre: Pop, dance
- Length: 6:19
- Label: Avex Tune
- Songwriters: Tetsuya Komuro, Marc
- Producer: Komuro

Alisa Mizuki singles chronology
"Through the Season" (1998)	"Oh Darling" (1998)	"Asahi no Ataru Hashi" (1999)

"Oh Darling" is a single by Japanese recording artist Alisa Mizuki, released under the unit name Convertible, which is composed of Mizuki and Japanese model Kayato. It was released on July 8, 1998, as the third single from Mizuki's fifth studio album Innocence. The title track was written by Tetsuya Komuro and Marc Panther (credited as Marc) and composed and produced by Komuro. "Oh Darling" is Mizuki's fifth A-side to be produced by Komuro, the first since "Promise to Promise" (1996). The song served as theme song for the Fuji TV Getsuku drama Boy Hunt, starring Mizuki herself.

== Chart performance ==
"Oh Darling" debuted on the Oricon Weekly Singles chart at number 34 with 8,790 copies sold in its first week. The song entered the top 30 at number 27 on its sixth week, with 16,030 copies sold. It peaked at number 23 with 17,600 copies sold the following week. The single charted for eleven weeks and has sold a total of 106,970 copies.

== Track listing ==
All lyrics are written by Tetsuya Komuro, Marc; all music is composed by Komuro.

No.	Title	Arranger(s)	Length
1.	"Oh Darling (Single Mix)"	Komuro	6:19
2.	"Oh Darling (Hard Top Remix)"	Komuro	7:09
3.	"Oh Darling (Instrumental)"	Komuro	6:19
Total length:			19:52

== Charts and sales ==
Chart (1998)	Peak position	Sales
Oricon Weekly Singles	23	106,970
