= C'est la Vie (Alisa Mizuki song) =

Single by Alisa Mizuki to Asian2
- Released: September 28, 2005
- Genre: Pop
- Length: 4:30
- Label: Avex Tune
- Songwriter: 20, Tatsu
- Producer: Asian2

Alisa Mizuki singles chronology
""Shout It Out"" (2003)	""C'est la Vie"" (2005)	""Engaged"" (2008)

Alternative cover
- Cover artwork for the CD+DVD edition

"C'est la Vie" (セ・ラ・ビ, Se Ra Bi) is a single by Japanese recording artist Alisa Mizuki, featuring Japanese mixture rock band Asian2. It was released on September 28, 2005, nearly two and a half years since Mizuki's last single, "Shout It Out" (2003). The single was issued in two formats: CD+DVD edition and CD-only edition.

The title track was produced by Asian2 and written by the band's two MCs, 20 and Tatsu. It served as theme song for the film Tobi ga Kururi to, starring Mizuki herself. CDJournal described "C'est la Vie" as a "lively and cheerful, brassy and rhythmic track about believing in yourself." The B-side, "Sweet One Week," is a cover of a Koushoku Jinshu song of the same name, from their debut studio album Akarui Mirai Keikaku, and is performed by Mizuki alone.

"C'est la Vie" debuted on the Oricon Weekly Singles chart at number 106 and only charted for one week, selling a total of 880 copies.

== Track listing ==
No.	Title	Lyrics	Music	Arranger(s)	Length
1.	"C'est la Vie" (セ・ラ・ビ Se Ra Bi)	20, Tatsu	Tatsu	Asian2	4:30
2.	"Sweet One Week"	Kayo	Kayo	Koushoku Jinshu	4:21
3.	"C'est la Vie (Instrumental)"		Tatsu	Asian2	4:29
4.	"Sweet One Week (Instrumental)"		Kayo	Koushoku Jinshu	4:21
Total length:					17:41

DVD
No.	Title	Length
1.	"C'est la Vie"
2.	"C'est la Vie (Off-shot)"

== Charts and sales ==
Chart (2005)	Peak position	Sales
Oricon Weekly Singles	106	880
