= Love Potion (song) =

2002 single by Alisa Mizuki

Single by Alisa Mizuki

from the album History: Alisa Mizuki Complete Single Collection
- Released: August 21, 2002
- Genre: Pop
- Length: 4:12
- Label: Avex Tune
- Songwriters: Takeshi Aida, Steve Kipner, David Frank, Pamela Sheyne
- Producer: Takao Konishi

Alisa Mizuki singles chronology
"Vacation" (2002)	"Love Potion" (2002)	"Shout It Out" (2003)

"Love Potion" is the twenty-first single by Japanese recording artist Alisa Mizuki. It was released on August 21, 2002, as the fifth single from Mizuki's fourth compilation album History: Alisa Mizuki Complete Single Collection. The title track is a Japanese-language cover Christina Aguilera's "Genie in a Bottle" (1998). The Japanese lyrics were written by Takeshi Aida (相田毅). The song served as theme song for the fourth and final season of the Fuji TV drama Nurse no Oshigoto.

The A-side and theme song for the drama was initially announced to be a cover of Madonna's "Crazy for You" (1985), however "Genie in a Bottle" ended up being the song Mizuki covered for the drama. The said cover of "Crazy for You" subsequently went unreleased.

"Love Potion" is Mizuki's second single to be issued in CCCD format.

== Chart performance ==
"Love Potion" debuted on the Oricon Weekly Singles chart at number 30 with 7,260 copies sold in its first week. The single charted for three weeks and has sold a total of 13,490 copies.

== Track listing ==
No.	Title	Lyrics	Music	Arranger(s)	Length
1.	"Love Potion"	Takeshi Aida, Steve Kipner, David Frank, Pamela Sheyne	Kipner, Frank, Sheyne	Takao Konishi	4:12
2.	"Sympathy"	Ryō Mama	Kazuhiro Hara	Hara	4:00
3.	"Love Potion (Instrumental)"		Kipner, Frank, Sheyne	Konishi	4:12
4.	"Sympathy (Instrumental)"		Hara	Hara	4:00
Total length:					16:35

== Charts and sales ==
Chart (2002)	Peak position	Sales
Oricon Weekly Singles	30	13,490
