= Asahi no Ataru Hashi =

Single by Alisa Mizuki

from the album Innocence
- Released: February 3, 1999
- Genre: Pop
- Length: 4:47
- Label: Avex Tune
- Songwriters: Hiromi Mori, T2ya
- Producer: Hiroaki Hayama

Alisa Mizuki singles chronology
"Oh Darling" (1998)	"Asahi no Ataru Hashi" (1999)	"Eternal Message" (1999)

"Asahi no Ataru Hashi" (朝陽のあたる橋; lit. "Bridge Under the Morning Sun") is the sixteenth single by Japanese recording artist Alisa Mizuki. It was released on February 3, 1999, as the fourth single from Mizuki's fifth studio album Innocence. The title track was written by Hiromi Mori, composed by T2ya, and produced by Tourbillon keyboardist Hiroaki Hayama. It served as theme song for the Fuji TV drama Tenshi no Oshigoto, starring Mizuki herself. The B-side, "Previous Days," was written and produced by Amii Ozaki.

== Chart performance ==
"Asahi no Ataru Hashi" debuted on the Oricon Weekly Singles chart at number 33 with 9,480 copies sold in its first week. The single charted for three weeks and has sold a total of 11,490 copies.

== Track listing ==
No.	Title	Lyrics	Music	Arranger(s)	Length
1.	"Asahi no Ataru Hashi" (朝陽のあたる橋 "Bridge Under the Morning Sun")	Hiromi Mori	T2ya	Hiroaki Hayama	4:47
2.	"True"	Amii Ozaki	Ozaki	Ozaki	4:48
3.	"Asahi no Ataru Hashi (Instrumental)"		T2ya	Hayama	4:47
4.	"True (Instrumental)"		Ozaki	Ozaki	4:48
Total length:					19:14

== Charts and sales ==
Chart (1999)	Peak position	Sales
Oricon Weekly Singles	33	18,540
