= Chōshōjo Reiko =

- Film poster
- Directed by: Takao Okawara
- Screenplay by: Takao Okawara
- Produced by: Shōgo Tomiyama
- Starring: Arisa Mizuki; Ken Osawa; Wakako Shimazaki; Koichi Sato
- Cinematography: Kenichi Yamada
- Edited by: Chizuko Osada
- Music by: Tomoyuki Asakawa
- Production companies: Toho; Burning Productions
- Distributed by: Toho
- Release date: 16 November 1991 (Japan)
- Running time: 99 minutes
- Country: Japan
- Language: Japanese

Chōshōjo Reiko (Japanese: 超少女REIKO) (lit. 'Supernatural Power Girl REIKO') is a 1991 Japanese film written and directed by Takao Okawara.

== Production ==
Prior to working on Chōshōjo Reiko, director Takao Okawara worked as an assistant director at Toho, often pitching ideas for a script that were ignored. Okawara decided to develop a story and enter it into a competition; he hoped that if he won, the story would get better attention from upper staff at Toho. Okawara developed a story that he stated had a "sellable script" aimed at teenage audiences, which persuaded him to include a fantasy element of extrasensory perception. He submitted his story to the Kido Awards, where it won second place. This influenced Toho to allow Okawara to direct it.

The film's cast included Arisa Mizuki, who was an unknown actress at the time and would be known as a supermodel by 2000. Okawara described the shooting of the film as difficult, stating that the film's low budget did not allow him to have a special effects director, making him perform both duties himself.

== Release ==
Chōshōjo Reiko was distributed theatrically in Japan by Toho on November 16, 1991. Norman England of Fangoria stated the film failed to find an audience in Japan, referring to it as a "box-office dud." Producer Shōgo Tomiyama felt that despite the film's failure at the box office, its quality was good enough to allow Okawara to direct later films in the Godzilla film series.

Arisa Mizuki won the "Newcomer of the Year" award at the Japanese Academy Awards for her role in the film.

== See also ==
- List of Japanese films of 1991
