= Megami no Mai =

2000 single by Alisa Mizuki

Single by Alisa Mizuki

from the album History: Alisa Mizuki Complete Single Collection
- Released: August 23, 2000
- Genre: Pop
- Length: 4:22
- Label: Avex Tune
- Songwriter: Tsunku
- Producer: Tsunku

Alisa Mizuki singles chronology
"Break All Day!" (2000)	"Megami no Mai" (2000)	"Hitomi no Chikara" (2002)

"Megami no Mai" (女神の舞; lit. "Goddess Dance") is the nineteenth single by Japanese recording artist Alisa Mizuki. It was released on August 23, 2000, as the second single from Mizuki's fourth compilation album History: Alisa Mizuki Complete Single Collection.

The title track was written and produced by Tsunku, whose background vocals are featured in the choruses of the song. The song served as theme song for the second half (episodes 15-24) of the third season of the Fuji TV drama Nurse no Oshigoto, starring Mizuki herself. The single also includes the B-side "Believe in Your Way," written by Yūko Ebine and Kazuhiro Hara and composed and produced by Hara, and a remix of "Megami no Mai" by Chokkaku.

== Chart performance ==
"Megami no Mai" debuted on the Oricon Weekly Singles chart at number 20 with 17,230 copies sold in its first week. The single charted for four weeks and has sold a total of 32,740 copies.

== Track listing ==
No.	Title	Lyrics	Music	Arranger(s)	Length
1.	"Megami no Mai" (女神の舞 "Goddess Dance")	Tsunku	Tsunku	Ken Matsubara	4:22
2.	"Believe in Your Way"	Yūko Ebine, Kazuhiro Hara	Hara	Hara, Tatsuya Murayama	5:07
3.	"Megami no Mai (Fu Fha Ha H"aa Mix)"	Tsunku	Tsunku	Chokkaku	4:58
4.	"Megami no Mai (Instrumental)"		Tsunku	Matsubara	4:22
Total length:					19:00

== Charts and sales ==
Chart (2000)	Peak position	Sales
Oricon Weekly Singles	20	32,740
