= Hitomi no Chikara =

Single by Alisa Mizuki

from the album History: Alisa Mizuki Complete Single Collection
- Released: February 6, 2002
- Genre: Pop
- Length: 4:31
- Label: Avex Tune
- Songwriters: Hiromi Mori, Toshihiko Takamizawa
- Producer: Keiichi Ueno

Alisa Mizuki singles chronology
"Megami no Mai" (2000)	"Hitomi no Chikara" (2002)	"Vacation" (2002)

"Hitomi no Chikara" (ヒトミノチカラ; lit. "Power of the Eyes") is the twentieth single by Japanese recording artist Alisa Mizuki. It was released on February 6, 2002, over a year and a half since "Megami no Mai" (2000), as the third single from Mizuki's fourth compilation album History: Alisa Mizuki Complete Single Collection.

The title track was written by lyricist Hiromi Mori, composed by The Alfee guitarist Toshihiko Takamizawa, and arranged by Keiichi Ueno. It served as second ending theme (episodes 13-30) for the TV Tokyo anime Hikaru no Go. CDJournal described the song as a "catchy and reminiscent of The Alfee circa 1980s" and praised Mizuki's "upbeat" vocals. The single also includes a remix of "Hitomi no Chikara" and the B-side "Subete wa Kaze no Naka de," written and produced by Seikou Nagaoka.

== Chart performance ==
"Hitomi no Chikara" debuted on the Oricon Weekly Singles chart at number 33 with 7,700 copies sold in its first week. The single charted for three weeks and has sold a total of 15,280 copies.

== Track listing ==
No.	Title	Lyrics	Music	Arranger(s)	Length
1.	"Hitomi no Chikara" (ヒトミノチカラ "Power of the Eyes")	Hiromi Mori	Toshihiko Takamizawa	Keiichi Ueno	4:31
2.	"Hitomi no Chikara (Buzz Rock Version)"	Mori	Takamizawa	Zoë	4:46
3.	"Subete wa Kaze no Naka de" (すべては風の中で "Everything Is in the Wind")	Seikou Nagaoka	Nagaoka	Nagaoka	5:35
4.	"Hitomi no Chikara (Instrumental)"		Takamizawa	Ueno	4:28
Total length:					19:22

== Charts and sales ==
Chart (2002)	Peak position	Sales
Oricon Weekly Singles	33	15,280
