= Hoshi no Hate =

Single by Alisa Mizuki

from the album SpeciAlisa
- Released: August 17, 2011
- Genre: Pop
- Length: 4:00
- Label: Avex Tune
- Composer: Kawamura
- Lyricist: Yuka Kawamura
- Producer: Jun Asahi

Alisa Mizuki singles chronology
"Engaged" (2008)	"Hoshi no Hate" (2011)

"Hoshi no Hate" (星の果て; lit. "Edge of Stars") is the twenty-fourth single, and first re-cut single, by Japanese recording artist Alisa Mizuki. It was released on August 17, 2011, over three years and a half since "Engaged" (2008), as the first and only single from Mizuki's sixth studio album, SpeciAlisa. The single was issued in two formats: CD+DVD edition and CD-only edition.

The title track was written and composed by singer-songwriter Yuka Kawamura and served as theme song for the TBS drama Hanawake no Yon-shimai, starring Mizuki herself. CDJournal described "Hoshi no Hate" as a "ballad about marriage and family ties" that is "well-suited for the drama series it is used in." The B-side, "Alisa in Wonderland," was produced by Micro from Def Tech and is also featured on SpeciAlisa. The CD+DVD edition of the single includes the music videos for both songs.

"Hoshi no Hate" debuted and peaked at number 117 on the Oricon Weekly Singles chart and charted for only one week, selling 577 copies in total.

== Track listing ==
No.	Title	Lyrics	Music	Arranger(s)	Length
1.	"Hoshi no Hate" (星の果て "Edge of Stars")	Yuka Kawamura	Kawamura	Jun Asahi	4:00
2.	"Hoshi no Hate (Piano Version)"	Kawamura	Kawamura	Asahi	3:58
3.	"Alisa in Wonderland"	Micro, Alisa Mizuki, Mamamarock	Micro	Micro	4:51
4.	"Hoshi no Hate (Instrumental)"		Kawamura	Asahi	4:00
5.	"Alisa in Wonderland (Instrumental)"		Micro	Micro	4:49
Total length:					21:40

DVD
No.	Title	Length
1.	"Hoshi no Hate (Music Clip)"
2.	"Alisa in Wonderland (Music Clip)"
3.	"Making of 'Hoshi no Hate'"

== Charts ==
Chart (2011)	Peak position
Oricon Weekly Singles	117
