= Through the Season =

Single by Alisa Mizuki

from the album Innocence
- Released: May 27, 1998
- Genre: Pop
- Length: 4:10
- Label: Avex Tune
- Songwriters: Yūko Ebine, Hiroaki Hayama
- Producer: Hayama

Alisa Mizuki singles chronology
"Days" (1997)	"Through the Season" (1998)	"Oh Darling" (1998)

"Through the Season" is the fifteenth single by Japanese recording artist Alisa Mizuki. It was released on May 27, 1998, as the second single from Mizuki's fifth studio album Innocence. The title track was written by Yūko Ebine and composed and produced by Tourbillon keyboardist Hiroaki Hayama. The song was used in commercials for Piknik lactic drinks by Morinaga Milk, starring Mizuki herself. The B-side, "Previous Days," was written and produced by T2ya.

== Chart performance ==
"Through the Season" debuted on the Oricon Weekly Singles chart at number 49 with 6,250 copies sold in its first week. The single charted for three weeks and has sold a total of 11,490 copies.

== Track listing ==
No.	Title	Lyrics	Music	Arranger(s)	Length
1.	"Through the Season"	Yūko Ebine	Hiroaki Hayama	Hayama	4:42
2.	"Previous Days"	T2ya	T2ya	T2ya	4:28
3.	"Through the Season (Instrumental)"		Hayama	Hayama	4:42
4.	"Previous Days (Instrumental)"		T2ya	T2ya	4:28
Total length:					18:34

== Charts and sales ==
Chart (1998)	Peak position	Sales
Oricon Weekly Singles	49	11,490
