= Forever Love (Alisa Mizuki song) =

Single by Alisa Mizuki

from the album Fiore II
- Released: April 23, 1997
- Genre: Pop
- Length: 4:17
- Label: Nippon Columbia
- Songwriter: Hiromasa Ijichi
- Producer: Ijichi

Alisa Mizuki singles chronology
"Promise to Promise" (1996)	"Forever Love" (1997)	"Days" (1997)

"Forever Love" is the thirteenth single by Japanese recording artist Alisa Mizuki. It was released on April 23, 1997, as the fourth single from Mizuki's third compilation album Fiore II. The song was used in commercials for Kafeo canned coffee by Asahi Soft Drinks. "Forever Love" is Mizuki's last single released under Nippon Columbia. The single also marks the first release to credit Mizuki as Alisa Mizuki, rather than Arisa Mizuki.

== Chart performance ==
"Forever Love" debuted on the Oricon Weekly Singles chart at number 35 with 11,600 copies sold in its first week. The single charted for three weeks and has sold a total of 21,710 copies.

== Track listing ==
All tracks are written by Hiromasa Ijichi.

No.	Title	Arranger(s)	Length
1.	"Forever Love"	Yasutaka Mizushima	4:17
2.	"In My Life"	Mizushima	3:21
3.	"Forever Love (Original Karaoke)"	Mizushima	4:17
Total length:			12:04

== Charts and sales ==
Chart (1997)	Peak position	Sales
Oricon Weekly Singles	35	21,710
