= Eternal Message =

Single by Alisa Mizuki

from the album Innocence
- Released: April 28, 1999
- Genre: Pop
- Length: 4:08
- Label: Avex Tune
- Songwriters: Yūko Ebine, Hiroaki Hayama
- Producer: Hayama

Alisa Mizuki singles chronology
"Asahi no Ataru Hashi" (1999)	"Eternal Message" (1999)	"Break All Day!" (2000)

"Eternal Message" is the 17th single recorded by Japanese recording artist Alisa Mizuki. It was released on April 28, 1999 as the fifth and final single from Mizuki's fifth studio album Innocence. The title track was written by Yūko Ebine and composed and produced by Tourbillon keyboardist Hiroaki Hayama. The song was used in commercials for the TU-KA cell phone by KDDI. "Eternal Message" is Mizuki's last single to be issued in mini CD single (8 cm CD) format.

== Chart performance ==
"Eternal Message" debuted on the Oricon Weekly Singles chart at number 43 with 7,750 copies sold in its first week. The single charted for three weeks and has sold a total of 14,750 copies.

== Track listing ==
No.	Title	Lyrics	Music	Arranger(s)	Length
1.	"Eternal Message (Original Mix)"	Yūko Ebine	Hiroaki Hayama	Hayama	4:08
2.	"I Need You (Original Mix)"	Ryō Mama	Makihiko Akira	Akira	4:06
3.	"Eternal Message (Karaoke)"		Hayama	Hayama	4:08
Total length:					12:29

== Charts and sales ==
Chart (1999)	Peak position	Sales
Oricon Weekly Singles	43	14,750
