= Shout It Out (Alisa Mizuki song) =

Single by Alisa Mizuki

from the album History: Alisa Mizuki Complete Single Collection
- Released: May 21, 2003
- Genre: Pop, acid jazz
- Length: 4:35
- Label: Avex Tune
- Songwriters: Gorō Matsui, Jean-Paul 'Bluey' Maunick, Matt Cooper
- Producers: Maunick, Cooper

Alisa Mizuki singles chronology
"Love Potion" (2002)	"Shout It Out" (2003)	"C'est la Vie" (2005)

"Shout It Out" is the twenty-second single by Japanese recording artist Alisa Mizuki. It was released on May 21, 2003, as the sixth and final single from Mizuki's fourth compilation album History: Alisa Mizuki Complete Single Collection.

The title track is a Japanese-language was written by Gorō Matsui and composed and produced by Incognito members Jean-Paul 'Bluey' Maunick and Matt Cooper. The demo Maunick and Cooper sent Mizuki initially had English lyrics, however Matsui wrote Japanese lyrics for the song, at the request of Mizuki's team. The song served as theme song for the Fuji TV drama Diamond Girl, starring Mizuki herself. The B-side, "Eternal Space," was written by Emi Miyamoto and composed by house trio GTS member Gee.

CDJournal described "Shout It Out" as "resort music-esque" and "Eternal Space" as an "Eiichi Otaki-inspired summer track," noting that both songs showcased a "new and fresh" side of Mizuki.

"Shout It Out" is Mizuki's third and last single to be issued in CCCD format.

== Chart performance ==
"Shout It Out" debuted on the Oricon Weekly Singles chart at number 96 with 1,897 copies sold in its first week. The single charted for three weeks and has sold a total of 3,158 copies.

== Track listing ==
No.	Title	Lyrics	Music	Arranger(s)	Length
1.	"Shout It Out"	Gorō Matsui	Jean-Paul 'Bluey' Maunick, Matt Cooper	Maunick, Cooper	4:35
2.	"Eternal Space"	Emi Miyamoto	Gee	Satoshi Hidaka	4:56
3.	"Shout It Out (Instrumental)"		Maunick, Cooper	Maunick, Cooper	4:35
4.	"Eternal Space (Instrumental)"		Gee	Hidaka	4:57
Total length:					19:15

== Charts and sales ==
Chart (2003)	Peak position	Sales
Oricon Weekly Singles	96	3,158
