= Don't Be Shy (Arisa Mizuki song) =

Single by Arisa Mizuki

from the album Fiore II
- Released: December 1, 1995
- Genre: Pop, dance
- Length: 3:45
- Label: Nippon Columbia
- Composers: F&M Project
- Lyricist: Yuho Iwasato
- Producer: Yasuhiko Hoshino

Arisa Mizuki singles chronology
"Dakishimete!" (1995)	"Don't Be Shy" (1995)	"Kaze mo Sora mo Kitto..." (1996)

"Don't Be Shy" is the tenth single by Japanese recording artist Arisa Mizuki. It was released on December 1, 1995, as the first single from Mizuki's third compilation album Fiore II. "Don't Be Shy" is a Japanese cover of Italian singer-songwriter Marina Rei's song of the same name, released in 1994 under the alias Jamie Dee. It was written and composed by Frank Minoia and Rei, credited as F&M Project. The song was used in commercials for Koeda chocolate sticks by Morinaga, starring Mizuki herself.

== Chart performance ==
"Don't Be Shy" debuted on the Oricon Weekly Singles chart at number 39 with 13,250 copies sold in its first week. The single charted for three weeks and has sold a total of 30,340 copies.

== Track listing ==
All lyrics are written by Yuho Iwasato; all music is composed by F&M Project.

No.	Title	Arranger(s)	Length
1.	"Don't Be Shy"	Yasuhiko Hoshino	3:45
2.	"Don't Be Shy (Re-mix)"	Hoshino	6:13
3.	"Don't Be Shy (Extended Mix)"	Hoshino	5:57
4.	"Don't Be Shy (Original Karaoke)"	Hoshino	3:45
Total length:			18:40

== Charts and sales ==
Chart (1995)	Peak position	Sales
Oricon Weekly Singles	39	30,340
