= Vacation (Connie Francis song) =

1962 single by Connie Francis

Single by Connie Francis

from the album The Very Best of Connie Francis – Connie's 15 Biggest Hits
- B-side: "The Biggest Sin of All" (US); "It's Gonna Take Some Time" (UK); "It Happened Last Night" (JP)
- Released: 1962
- Recorded: 1962
- Genre: Rock and roll
- Length: 2:26
- Label: MGM
- Songwriters: Connie Francis, Hank Hunter, Gary Weston
- Producers: Danny Davis, Jim Vienneau

Connie Francis singles chronology
"Second Hand Love" (1962)	"Vacation" (1962)	"I Was Such a Fool (To Fall in Love with You)" (1962)

"Vacation" is a 1962 single by Connie Francis which was her final top-ten hit in both the US and the UK.

== Connie Francis version ==
=== Background ===
"Vacation" was written by Francis, Gary Weston, and Hank Hunter. Hank Hunter had written the previous Connie Francis single "Second Hand Love" and Francis would subsequently chart with the Hunter compositions "I'm Gonna Be Warm This Winter" (1962) and "Drownin' My Sorrows" (1963). "Vacation" became Francis' only hit on which she had writing credits. Francis has stated: "when ["Vacation"] was brought to me, they only had 'V-a-c-a-t-i-o-n in the summer sun.' That's all they wrote. I wrote the rest of the words and didn't even take credit for it." (In reality, Francis has always received songwriting credit on the track.)

The song was originally intended as a B-side but proved more radio friendly than the intended hit, "The Biggest Sin of All". Both sides of the single were recorded at Columbia Recording Studio in Nashville on June 18 1962, with Bill McElhiney of the Nashville Brass performing, arranging, and conducting duties.

=== Chart impact ===
"Vacation" entered the Billboard Hot 100 in July 1962 to peak at number 9 the first week of September 1962: on the Top 100 Singles chart in Cashbox "Vacation" peaked at number 10. "Vacation" debuted on the UK Singles Chart at number 40 in the first week of August 1962 and peaked at number 10 in the first week of that September. The track became a hit in several territories in the autumn of 1962 reaching number three in Australia, number two in Hong Kong, and number five in Israel. In Japan, where Francis' version was co-ranked with a cover by Michi Aoyama, "Vacation" reached number one in December 1962.

Enough US radio stations played "The Biggest Sin of All", as well or instead of "Vacation", for "The Biggest Sin of All" to appear on the Cash Box top 100 for one week at number 89. The track also appeared on the Bubbling Under Hot 100 Singles chart in Billboard with a number 16 peak.

It is also noted that this is the last song that would reach the top 10 in any type of pop chart for Francis.

Chart performance for "Vacation" by Connie Francis
Chart (1962)	Peak position
Australia (Music Maker)	3
Canada (CHUM Chart)	15
Hong Kong	2
Israel (Kol Yisrael)	5
Japan (Utamatic)	1
UK Singles Chart	10
US Billboard Hot 100	9
US Record World 100 Top Pops	9
US Cashbox 100 Top Singles	10

== Alisa Mizuki version ==
"Vacation"

Single by Izumi Asakura with Nurse no Oshigoto

from the album History: Alisa Mizuki Complete Single Collection
- Released: April 24, 2002
- Genre: Pop
- Length: 2:48
- Label: Avex Tune
- Songwriters: Kenji Sazanami, Francis, Hunter, Weston
- Producer: Takao Konishi

Alisa Mizuki singles chronology
"Hitomi no Chikara" (2002)	"Vacation" (2002)	"Love Potion" (2002)

"Vacation" was recorded by Alisa Mizuki for the Mizuki-led film Nurse no Oshigoto: The Movie and released as a single on April 24, 2002, under the name of the main character, Izumi Asakura with Nurse no Oshigoto. Mizuki's "Vacation" is a Japanese-language cover of the 1962 Connie Francis hit of the same name. The Japanese lyrics were written by Kenji Sazanami. The song is included on Mizuki's fourth compilation album History: Alisa Mizuki Complete Single Collection.

"Vacation" debuted on the Oricon Weekly Singles chart at number 72 with 2,790 copies sold in its first week. The single charted for two weeks and has sold a total of 5,360 copies.

=== Track listing ===
No.	Title	Lyrics	Music	Arranger(s)	Length
1.	"Vacation"	Kenji Sazanami, Connie Francis, Hank Hunter, Gary Weston	Francis, Hunter, Weston	Takao Konishi	2:48
2.	"Vacation" (Hyper Mix)	Sazanami, Francis, Hunter, Weston	Francis, Hunter, Weston	Konishi	2:59
3.	"Vacation" (Punkish Mix)	Sazanami, Francis, Hunter, Weston	Francis, Hunter, Weston	Keiji Matsui	2:38
4.	"Vacation" (instrumental)		Francis, Hunter, Weston	Konishi	2:49
Total length:					11:23

=== Charts ===
Chart performance for "Vacation" by Alisa Mizuki
Chart (2002)	Peak position	Sales
Oricon Weekly Singles	72	5,360
