= Hallgeir =

Hallgeir is a given name. Notable people with the name include:

- Hallgeir Brenden (1929–2007), Norwegian cross-country skier, Olympic gold medalist
- Hallgeir H. Langeland, Norwegian politician
