= Days (Alisa Mizuki song) =

Single by Alisa Mizuki

from the album Fiore II and Innocence
- Released: November 19, 1997
- Genre: Pop
- Length: 4:10
- Label: Avex Tune
- Songwriter(s): Mitsuru Igarashi
- Producer(s): Igarashi

Alisa Mizuki singles chronology
"Forever Love" (1997)	"Days" (1997)	"Through the Season" (1998)

"Days" is the fourteenth single by Japanese recording artist Alisa Mizuki. It was released on November 19, 1997 as the fifth and final single from Mizuki's third compilation album Fiore II. It was also included on Mizuki's fifth studio album Innocence. The title track was written and produced by former Every Little Thing keyboardist Mitsuru Igarashi and served as theme song for the second season of the Fuji TV drama Nurse no Oshigoto, starring Mizuki herself. "Days" is Mizuki's first release under the record label Avex Tune.

== Chart performance ==
"Days" debuted on the Oricon Weekly Singles chart at number 14 with 28,020 copies sold in its first week. It stayed in the top 30, at number 24, on its second week, with 18,660 copies sold. The single charted for nine weeks and has sold a total of 101,120 copies.

== Track listing ==
No.	Title	Lyrics	Music	Arranger(s)	Length
1.	"Days"	Mitsuru Igarashi	Igarashi	Igarashi	4:10
2.	"Walk Into the Lights"	Kazumi Suzuki	Yasuhiko Hoshino	Hoshino	4:36
3.	"Days (Instrumental)"		Igarashi	Igarashi	4:10
4.	"Walk Into the Lights (Instrumental)"		Yasuhiko Hoshino	Hoshino	4:31
Total length:					17:37

== Charts and sales ==
Chart (1997)	Peak position	Sales
Oricon Weekly Singles	14	101,120
