= Kaze no Naka de =

Single by Arisa Mizuki

from the album Arisa
- A-side: "Kaze no Naka de"
- B-side: "Graduation (Tobira o Nukete)"
- Released: November 21, 1991
- Genre: Pop
- Length: 5:34
- Label: Nippon Columbia
- Songwriter: Amii Ozaki
- Producer: Akira Inoue

Arisa Mizuki singles chronology
"Eden no Machi" (1991)	"Kaze no Naka de" (1991)	"Too Shy Shy Boy!" (1992)

"Kaze no Naka de" (風の中で; lit. "In the Wind") is the third single by Japanese recording artist Arisa Mizuki. It was released on November 21, 1991 as the third and final single from Mizuki's debut studio album Arisa. Both the A-side and B-side were written and composed by Amii Ozaki. The title track, "Kaze no Naka de," served as theme song for Mizuki's first feature film Chō Shōjo Reiko. "Graduation (Tobira o Nukete)" served as theme song for the Japanese dub of the animated series Babar. "Kaze no Naka de," which was written for Mizuki's debut album Arisa, was released as a single at Mizuki's request.

== Chart performance ==
"Kaze no Naka de" debuted on the Oricon Weekly Singles chart at number 10 with 49,740 copies sold in its first week. The single charted for eight weeks and has sold a total of 121,870 copies. "Kaze no Naka de" was the 18th best-selling single of December 1991.

== Track listing ==
All tracks are written by Amii Ozaki.

No.	Title	Arranger(s)	Length
1.	"Kaze no Naka de" (風の中で "In the Wind")	Akira Inoue	5:34
2.	"Graduation (Tobira o Nukete)" (Graduation～扉を抜けて～ "Graduation (Out the Door)")	Yasuhiro Tomita	5:29
Total length:			11:03

== Charts ==
Chart (1991)	Peak position
Oricon Weekly Singles	10
Oricon Monthly Singles	18
