= Arisa (album) =

Studio album by Alisa Mizuki
- Released: December 4, 1991
- Recorded: 1991
- Genre: Pop
- Length: 53:28
- Label: Nippon Columbia
- Producers: Ichirō Hada; Akira Inoue; Masami Kishimura; Takeshi Kobayashi; Tetsuya Komuro; Seiichi Kyōda; Yasuhisa Murase; Kaori Okui; Masanori Sasaji; Jun Satō; Takao Sugiyama; Tetsuo Taira (exec.)

Alisa Mizuki chronology
Arisa (1991)	Arisa II: Shake Your Body for Me (1992)

Singles from Arisa
- 1. "Densetsu no Shōjo" Released: May 15, 1991; 2. "Eden no Machi" Released: August 28, 1991; 3. "Kaze no Naka de" Released: November 21, 1991

Arisa is the debut studio album by Japanese recording artist Arisa Mizuki, released through Nippon Columbia on December 4, 1991. Arisa is predominantly a pop music album. It is written by an array of famous Japanese musicians, including Amii Ozaki, Princess Princess vocalist Kaori Okui, Takeshi Kobayashi, Tetsuya Komuro, and The Alfee guitarist Toshihiko Takamizawa. In its review of the album, CDJournal described Arisa as an "idol record" that can appeal to actual music lovers. The online magazine praised Mizuki's vocal ability for being "far greater than the typical teenager" and noted that the only apparent flaw was the album's lack of cohesion.

The album spawned three singles, "Densetsu no Shōjo," "Eden no Machi," and "Kaze no Naka de," all of which were top ten hits. The original version of "Densetsu no Shōjo" is not featured on the album, instead an extended album version was included. Arisa debuted at number 8 on the Oricon Weekly Albums chart, selling 49,950 copies in its first week.

The official title of track six is "Cherry Cherry ♥ Strawberry," with the black heart mark. The official pronunciation for the title of track ten, "月" ("moon" in Japanese), which is habitually romanized as "Tsuki," is "Luna" (ルーナ).

== Commercial performance ==
Arisa debuted on the Oricon Weekly Albums chart at number 8 with 49,950 copies sold in its first week. It spent a second week in the top twenty at number 20 with 20,990 copies sold. The album charted for eight weeks and has sold a total of 123,980 copies.

== Track listing ==
No.	Title	Lyrics	Music	Length
1.	"Yume Dake no Boyfriend" (夢だけのボーイフレンド Yume Dake no Bōifurendo "Boyfriend In My Dreams Only")	Mitsuko Komuro	Tetsuya Komuro	4:25
2.	"Kanashimi wa Shinka Suru" (悲しみは進化する "Sadness Grows")	Neko Oikawa	Takeshi Kobayashi	5:12
3.	"Sepia no Kodō" (Sepiaの鼓動 "Sepia Beat")	Midori Karashima	Karashima	4:54
4.	"Septième Sens (Dainanakan)" (セッティェームサンス ～第七感～ Settiēmu Sansu (Dainanakan) "Septième Sens (Seventh Sens)")	Masaya Ozeki	Ozeki	4:55
5.	"Kaze no Naka de"	Amii Ozaki	Ozaki	5:34
6.	"Cherry Cherry Strawberry"	Minoru Komorita	Komorita	4:29
7.	"Eden no Machi"	Jun Taguchi	Kaori Okui	3:57
8.	"Yurete My Heart" (揺れてマイ・ハート Yurete Mai Hāto "My Heart Sways")	Karashima	Karashima	4:26
9.	"Kaze ni Notte" (風に乗って "Ride the Wind")	Toshihiko Takamizawa	Takamizawa	5:00
10.	"Luna" (月)	Chihiro Sawa	Ichirō Hada	4:58
11.	"Densetsu no Shōjo (Album Version)"	Ozaki	Ozaki	5:47
Total length:				53:28

== Charts and sales ==
Chart (1991)	Peak position	Sales
Oricon Weekly Albums	8	123,980
