= Promise to Promise =

Single by Arisa Mizuki

from the album Arisa's Favorite: T.K. Songs and Fiore II
- Released: July 24, 1996
- Genre: Pop
- Length: 4:23
- Label: Nippon Columbia
- Songwriters: Tetsuya Komuro, Takahiro Maeda
- Producer: Komuro

Arisa Mizuki singles chronology
"Kaze mo Sora mo Kitto..." (1996)	"Promise to Promise" (1996)	"Forever Love" (1997)

"Promise to Promise" is the twelfth single by Japanese recording artist Arisa Mizuki. It was released on July 24, 1996 as the first and only single from Mizuki's second compilation album Arisa's Favorite: T.K. Songs, which features the "Urban Street Mix" version. The "Straight Run" version was included in Mizuki's third compilation album Fiore II. The title track served as the theme song for the first season of the Fuji TV drama Nurse no Oshigoto, starring Mizuki herself. "Promise to Promise" was written by Tetsuya Komuro and Takahiro Maeda, and composed and produced by Komuro, making it Mizuki's fourth single to be produced by Komuro. Komuro wrote the song after having read the script for the drama.

== Chart performance ==
"Promise to Promise" debuted on the Oricon Weekly Singles chart at number 17 with 34,470 copies sold in its first week. It stayed in the top 20, at number 19, in its second week, with 26,840 copies sold. The single charted for eleven weeks and has sold a total of 143,020 copies.

== Track listing ==
All lyrics are written by Tetsuya Komuro, Takahiro Maeda; all music is composed by Komuro.

No.	Title	Arranger(s)	Length
1.	"Promise to Promise (Straight Run)"	Komuro	4:23
2.	"Promise to Promise (Urban Street Mix)"	Komuro	4:34
3.	"Promise to Promise (TV Mix)"	Komuro	4:23
Total length:			13:23

== Charts and sales ==
Chart (1996)	Peak position	Sales
Oricon Weekly Singles	17	143,020
