= Kaze mo Sora mo Kitto... =

1996 single by Alisa Mizuki

Single by Arisa Mizuki

from the album Fiore II
- Released: April 20, 1996
- Genre: Pop
- Length: 4:44
- Label: Nippon Columbia
- Songwriter: Chika Ueda
- Producer: Hiroyuki Ōtsuki

Arisa Mizuki singles chronology
"Don't Be Shy" (1995)	"Kaze mo Sora mo Kitto..." (1996)	"Promise to Promise" (1996)

"Kaze mo Sora mo Kitto..." (風も空もきっと…; lit. 'The Wind, the Sky, Surely...') is a song performed by Japanese recording artist Arisa Mizuki, featured as the seventh track on her third compilation album, Fiore II. It was released on April 20, 1996, as the second single from the album. Written by Chika Ueda, the song served as ending theme for the final season of the TV Asahi anime Sailor Moon, Sailor Stars. Two versions of the song were used on the show: an initial version, arranged by Takao Konishi (episodes 167-172), and the actual single version (episodes 173-199), arranged by Hiroyuki Ōtsuki.

== Chart performance ==
"Kaze mo Sora mo Kitto..." debuted on the Oricon Weekly Singles chart at number 24 with 14,130 copies sold in its first week. The single charted for three weeks and has sold a total of 27,530 copies.

== Track listing ==
All tracks are written by Chika Ueda.

No.	Title	Arranger(s)	Length
1.	"Kaze mo Sora mo Kitto..." (風も空もきっと… "The Wind, the Sky, Surely...")	Hiroyuki Ōtsuki	4:44
2.	"Kaze mo Sora mo Kitto... (Original Karaoke)"	Ōtsuki	4:44
Total length:			9:32

== Charts and sales ==
Chart (1996)	Peak position	Sales
Oricon Weekly Singles	24	27,530
