= Kimi ga Suki Dakara =

Single by Arisa Mizuki

from the album Fiore
- Released: August 11, 1993
- Genre: Pop
- Length: 5:12
- Label: Nippon Columbia
- Songwriters: Jun Taguchi, Karuho Kureta
- Producer: Masaaki Ōmura

Arisa Mizuki singles chronology
| "Kotoshi Ichiban Kaze no Tsuyoi Gogo" (1993) | "Kimi ga Suki Dakara" (1993) | "Happy Wake Up!" (1994) |

"Kimi ga Suki Dakara" (君が好きだから; lit. "Because I Love You") is the sixth single by Japanese recording artist Arisa Mizuki. It was released on August 11, 1993 as the second single from Mizuki's first compilation album Fiore: Arisa Collection.

The title track was written by Jun Taguchi and composed by Yumi Matsutoya, under the pen-name Karuho Kureta. It served as theme song for the Fuji TV drama Jajauma Narashi, starring Mizuki herself. The B-side, "Utatte Agetai," was written by lyricist Kanata Asamizu, composed by pianist Toshiaki Matsumoto, and produced by Seiji Kameda. In 1995, Riona Hazuki recorded a cover of "Kimi ga Suki Dakara" for her album Riona.

== Chart performance ==
"Kimi ga Suki Dakara" debuted on the Oricon Weekly Singles chart at number 10 with 55,820 copies sold in its first week. The single charted for ten weeks and has sold a total of 176,360 copies.

== Track listing ==
| No. | Title | Lyrics | Music | Arranger(s) | Length |
|---|---|---|---|---|---|
| 1. | "Kimi ga Suki Dakara" (君が好きだから "Because I Love You") | Jun Taguchi | Karuho Kureta | Masaaki Ōmura | 5:12 |
| 2. | "Utatte Agetai" (唄ってあげたい "I Want to Sing for You") | Kanata Asamizu | Toshiaki Matsumoto | Seiji Kameda | 4:45 |
| 3. | "Kimi ga Suki Dakara (Original Karaoke)" | | Kureta | Ōmura | 5:12 |
| Total length: | | | | | 15:09 |

== Charts and sales ==
| Chart (1993) | Peak position | Sales |
|---|---|---|
| Oricon Weekly Singles | 10 | 176,360 |
