= Anata no Sedai e Kuchizuke o =

Single by Arisa Mizuki

from the album Cute
- Released: February 13, 1995
- Genre: Pop
- Length: 5:29
- Label: Nippon Columbia
- Songwriter: Tetsuya Komuro
- Producer: Komuro

Arisa Mizuki singles chronology
"Happy Wake Up!" (1994)	"Anata no Sedai e Kuchizuke o" (1995)	"Dakishimete!" (1995)

"Anata no Sedai e Kuchizuke o" (あなたの世代へくちづけを; lit. "A Kiss for Your Generation") is the eighth single by Japanese recording artist Arisa Mizuki. It was released on February 13, 1995, as the first single from Mizuki's fourth studio album Cute.

The title track was written and produced by Tetsuya Komuro. It served as theme song for the Fuji TV drama Help!, starring Mizuki herself. A second take of "Anata no Sedai e Kuchizuke o", sung on a higher key, was recorded for Mizuki's compilation album Arisa's Favorite: T.K. Songs. The B-side, "Aru Hi, Aru Asa, Koibito wa," was also written and produced by Komuro, while the music was composed Cozy Kubo.

== Chart performance ==
"Anata no Sedai e Kuchizuke o" debuted on the Oricon Weekly Singles chart at number 9 with 64,780 copies sold in its first week. The single charted for six weeks and has sold a total of 131,640 copies.

== Track listing ==
All lyrics are written by Tetsuya Komuro.

No.	Title	Music	Arranger(s)	Length
1.	"Anata no Sedai e Kuchizuke o" (あなたの世代へくちづけを "A Kiss for Your Generation")	Komuro	Cozy Kubo	5:29
2.	"Aru Hi, Aru Asa, Koibito wa" (ある日 ある朝 恋人は "One Day, One Morning, My Lover Was")	Kubo	Kubo	5:37
3.	"Anata no Sedai e Kuchizuke o (Original Karaoke)"		Komuro, Cozy Kubo	5:29
Total length:				16:35

== Charts and sales ==
Chart (1995)	Peak position	Sales
Oricon Weekly Singles	9	131,640
