= Innocence (Alisa Mizuki album) =

Studio album by Alisa Mizuki
- Released: November 17, 1999
- Recorded: 1997–99
- Genre: Pop
- Length: 56:22
- Label: Avex Tune
- Producer: Kazuhiro Hara, Hiroaki Hayama, Genki Hibino, Mitsuru Igarashi, Takehiro Kawabe, Shingo Kobayashi, Tetsuya Komuro, Hiroyuki Kōzu, Masato "Max" Matsuura (exec.), MID, Jonny Taira (exec.)

Alisa Mizuki chronology
Cute (1995)	Innocence (1999)	SpeciAlisa (2011)

Alternative cover
- Cover artwork for first press sleeve case

Singles from Innocence
- 1. "Through the Season" Released: May 27, 1998; 2. "Oh Darling" Released: July 8, 1998; 3. "Asahi no Ataru Hashi" Released: February 3, 1999; 4. "Eternal Message" Released: April 28, 1999

Innocence is the fifth studio album by Japanese recording artist Arisa Mizuki, released through Avex Tune on November 17, 1999. It is Mizuki's first studio album in over four years, since Cute, and the first to be released under Avex Tune. The album produced four original singles: "Through the Season," "Oh Darling" (released under the alias Convertible), "Asahi no Ataru Hashi," and Eternal Message. All singles, as well as track three of the album, "All My Love," which was used in commercials for the TU-KA cell phone by KDDI, had a commercial tie-in. Innocence is predominantly a pop music album. CDJournal noted that the album "showcases the vocals of a grown-up Mizuki."

Innocence debuted at number 39 on the Oricon Weekly Albums chart with 6,920 copies in its first week, charting eighteen spots lower than Cute.

== Commercial performance ==
Innocence debuted on the Oricon Weekly Albums chart at number 39 with 6,290 copies sold in its first week. The album charted for two weeks and has sold a total of 10,020 copies.

== Track listing ==
No.	Title	Lyrics	Music	Length
1.	"Mermaid"	Kyōko Okita	Makito Hoshi	3:44
2.	"Realize"	Gajin	Gajin	4:58
3.	"All My Love"	Kazuhiro Hara	Hara	5:22
4.	"Eternal Message"	Yūko Ebine	Hiroaki Hayama	4:08
5.	"Asahi no Ataru Hashi"	Hiromi Mori	T2ya	4:54
6.	"Heaven Knows"	Hara	Hara	4:05
7.	"Ai no Yō na Mono" (愛のようなもの "Things Like Love")	Madoka	Genki Hibino	4:14
8.	"Girl Friend"	Alisa Mizuki, Okita, Ebine	Okita, Hoshi	4:37
9.	"Through the Season (Album Remix)"	Ebine	Hayama	4:38
10.	"Omoi" (想い "Feelings")	Gajin	Gajin	4:57
11.	"Days"	Mitsuru Igarashi	Igarashi	4:09
12.	"Oh Darling"	Tetsuya Komuro, Marc	Komuro	6:21
Total length:				56:22

== Charts and sales ==
Chart (1999)	Peak position	Sales
Oricon Weekly Albums	39	10,020
