= Kotoshi Ichiban Kaze no Tsuyoi Gogo =

Single by Arisa Mizuki

from the album Fiore
- Released: May 12, 1993
- Genre: Pop
- Length: 4:49
- Label: Nippon Columbia
- Songwriter: Karuho Kureta
- Producer: Masaaki Ōmura

Arisa Mizuki singles chronology
"Too Shy Shy Boy!" (1992)	"Kotoshi Ichiban Kaze no Tsuyoi Gogo" (1993)	"Kimi ga Suki Dakara" (1993)

"Kotoshi Ichiban Kaze no Tsuyoi Gogo" (今年いちばん風の強い午後; lit. "The Windiest Afternoon of the Year") is the fifth single by Japanese recording artist Arisa Mizuki. It was released on May 12, 1993 as the first single from Mizuki's first compilation album Fiore: Arisa Collection. The title track was written and composed by Yumi Matsutoya, under the pen-name Karuho Kureta. It was used in commercials for the soft drink Chasse by Kirin, starring Mizuki herself. "Sunao ni Naritai," is Mizuki's second consecutive B-side to be written and produced by singer-songwriter Midori Karashima.

== Chart performance ==
"Kotoshi Ichiban Kaze no Tsuyoi Gogo" debuted on the Oricon Weekly Singles chart at number 8 with 74,400 copies sold in its first week. The single charted for seven weeks and has sold a total of 192,950 copies.

== Track listing ==
No.	Title	Lyrics	Music	Arranger(s)	Length
1.	"Kotoshi Ichiban Kaze no Tsuyoi Gogo" (今年いちばん風の強い午後 "The Windiest Afternoon of the Year")	Karuho Kureta	Kureta	Masaaki Ōmura	4:49
2.	"Sunao ni Naritai" (素直になりたい "I Want to Be Honest")	Midori Karashima	Karashima	Seiichi Kyōda	5:59
3.	"Kotoshi Ichiban Kaze no Tsuyoi Gogo (Original Karaoke)"		Kureta	Ōmura	4:49
Total length:					15:37

== Charts and sales ==
Chart (1993)	Peak position	Sales
Oricon Weekly Singles	8	192,950
