= Arisa III: Look =

Studio album by Arisa Mizuki
- Released: December 24, 1994
- Recorded: 1994
- Genres: Pop, dance
- Length: 45:48
- Label: Nippon Columbia
- Producers: Tetsuya Komuro, Takao Konishi, Yasuharu Konishi, Arisa Mizuki (exec.), Yasuharu Ogura, Johny Taira (exec.)

Arisa Mizuki chronology
Arisa II: Shake Your Body for Me (1992)	Arisa III: Look (1994)	Cute (1995)

Singles from Arisa III: Look
- 1. "Happy Wake Up!" Released: October 3, 1994

Arisa III: Look is the third studio album by Japanese recording artist Arisa Mizuki, released through Nippon Columbia on December 24, 1994. It is predominantly a pop and dance music album that features songs written and produced by an array of famous Japanese musicians, including Anri, Yasuharu Konishi (of Pizzicato Five), Keizō Nakanishi, Takao Konishi, Chika Ueda, and Tetsuya Komuro. Arisa III: Look is Mizuki's first studio album in over two years.

As with her previous studio album, Arisa II: Shake Your Body for Me, Mizuki released a Komuro production as lead single. "Happy Wake Up!" was released two months prior to the release of Arisa III: Look and became Mizuki's second most successful song, selling over 340,000 copies. "Happy Wake Up!" was the first and sole single to be released from the album. The artwork for the album was created by art director Mitsuo Shindō, who has also worked with artists such as Misia, Glay, and SMAP.

Arisa III: Look debuted at number 24 on the Oricon Weekly Albums chart with 20,720 copies in its first week, becoming Mizuki's first studio album to chart outside the top twenty.

== Critical reception ==
CD Journal gave Arisa III: Look a positive review, complimenting Mizuki for her "outstanding singing sense" yet expressing disappointment at "Happy Wake Up!" being the album's catchiest offering. They further commented that Yasuharu Konishi's work on "Pari no Koibito / Tōkyō no Koibito", "Friend and Lover" and "Amai Kioku" is "laughable" at how "Pizzicato [Five]" it is.

== Commercial performance ==
Arisa III: Look debuted on the Oricon Weekly Albums chart at number 24 with 20,720 copies sold in its first week. The album charted for seven weeks and has sold a total of 66,870 copies.

== Track listing ==
No.	Title	Lyrics	Music	Length
1.	"Tooi Kioku (Instrumental)" (遠い記憶 "Distant Memories")		Yasuharu Konishi	1:17
2.	"Paris no Koibito / Tokyo no Koibito" (パリの恋人／トーキョーの恋人 Pari no Koibito / Tōkyō no Koibito "Paris Lover / Tokyo Lover")	Konishi	Konishi	4:12
3.	"In the Rain"	Chika Ueda	Ueda	5:34
4.	"Yasashii Yoru ni Aimashō" (優しい夜に逢いましょう "Let's Meet on a Tender Night")	Neko Oikawa	Hitoshi Haba	5:26
5.	"Cry for You"	Takahiro Maeda	Tetsuya Komuro	6:13
6.	"Next Generation"	Seriko Natsuno	Keizō Nakanishi	5:22
7.	"Friend and Lover"	Konishi	Konishi	5:44
8.	"Happy Wake Up!"	Komuro	Komuro	4:34
9.	"Sayonara no Okurimono" (さよならの贈りもの "The Gift of Goodbye")	Yumi Yoshimoto	Anri	4:42
10.	"Amai Kioku" (甘い記憶 "Sweet Memories")	Junko Sugimura	Konishi	2:44
Total length:				45:48

== Charts and sales ==
Chart (1994)	Peak position	Sales
Oricon Weekly Albums	24	66,870
