= Cute (album) =

Studio album by Arisa Mizuki
- Released: July 21, 1995
- Recorded: 1994–95
- Genre: Pop
- Length: 49:56
- Label: Nippon Columbia
- Producers: Takayuki Hijikata, Yas Kitajima (exec.), Tetsuya Komuro, Hiroshi Matsui, Masato "Max" Matsuura (exec.), Arisa Mizuki (exec.), Royal Mirrorball, Johny Taira (exec.)

Arisa Mizuki chronology
Arisa III: Look (1994)	Cute (1995)	Innocence (1999)

Singles from Cute
- 1. "Anata no Sedai e Kuchizuke o" Released: February 13, 1995; 2. "Dakishimete!" Released: May 24, 1995

Cute is the fourth studio album by Japanese recording artist Arisa Mizuki, released through Nippon Columbia on July 21, 1995. It is predominantly a pop music album. Cute was released only seventh months after Arisa III: Look and is Mizuki's last studio album to be released under Nippon Columbia. The album produced two singles, "Anata no Sedai e Kuchizuke o", written and produced by Tetsuya Komuro, and "Dakishimete!." Both singles debuted within the top twenty, with "Anata no Sedai e Kuchizuke o" becoming Mizuki's last single to break the top ten. Despite not being released as a single, track seven, "Kagayaite Ite (10 Years After)," was used as theme song for the NHK television and radio program Minna no Uta throughout June and July 1995.

CDJournal described Cute as a "percussive summer-driven dance pop" set with "occasional slow numbers" that mesh well with Mizuki's "angelic vocals." The online magazine singled out Komuro's sole contribution to the album, "Anata no Sedai e Kuchizuke o," as the most "orthodox" track on the record. The ninth track on the album, "Pitter Patter," is written and produced by Hiroshi Matsui and Suzi Kim, who are credited under the name of their production and songwriting team Royal Mirrorball.

Cute debuted at number 21 on the Oricon Weekly Albums chart with 21,950 copies in its first week, charting three spots higher than Arisa III: Look.

== Commercial performance ==
Cute debuted on the Oricon Weekly Albums chart at number 21 with 21,950 copies sold in its first week. The album fell nine spots to number 30 on its second week, selling 14,080 copies, before dropping out of the top thirty the following week. The album charted for five weeks and has sold a total of 52,890 copies.

== Track listing ==
No.	Title	Lyrics	Music	Length
1.	"Daisuki!" (大好き! "I Love You!")	Nastumi Watanabe	Hiroshi Matsui	5:23
2.	"Taiyō no Shima" (太陽の島 "Island of the Sun")	Yui Nishiwaki	Matsui	4:41
3.	"Breeze (Umi Kara no Denwa)" (breeze～海からの電話～ "Breeze (Phone Call from the Sea)")	Watanabe	Yasuhiko Hoshino	4:58
4.	"Manten no Hoshi no Shita de" (満天の星の下で "Beneath the Starry Sky")	Nishiwaki	Nishiwaki	4:44
5.	"Dakishimete!"	Masanori Nagaoka	Hoshino	5:10
6.	"Into the Night"	Yui Natsumi	Hoshino	4:48
7.	"Kagayaite Ite (10 Years After)" (輝いていて～10 years after～ "Shining (10 Years After)")	Watanabe	Hoshino	4:49
8.	"Anata no Sedai e Kuchizuke o"	Komuro	Komuro	5:29
9.	"Pitter Patter"	Royal Mirrorball	Royal Mirrorball	5:13
10.	"Yasashii Tenohira" (優しい手のひら "Gentle Palm")	Natsumi	Yasuhiro Abe	4:51
Total length:				49:56

== Charts and sales ==
Chart (1995)	Peak position	Sales
Oricon Weekly Albums	21	52,890
