= Arisa II: Shake Your Body for Me =

Studio album by Arisa Mizuki
- Released: October 1, 1992
- Recorded: 1992
- Genres: Pop, dance
- Length: 51:29
- Label: Nippon Columbia
- Producers: Motoki Funayama, Tetsuya Komuro, Takao Konishi, Arisa Mizuki (exec.), Yasuharu Ogura, Johny Taira (exec.)

Arisa Mizuki chronology
Arisa (1991)	Arisa II: Shake Your Body for Me (1992)	Arisa III: Look (1994)

Singles from Arisa II: Shake Your Body for Me
- 1. "Too Shy Shy Boy!" Released: May 27, 1992

Arisa II: Shake Your Body for Me is the second studio album by Japanese recording artist Arisa Mizuki, released through Nippon Columbia on October 1, 1992. Arisa II: Shake Your Body for Me is predominantly a pop and dance music album. It is written and produced by an array of famous Japanese musicians, including Anri, Keizō Nakanishi, Takao Konishi, and Tetsuya Komuro.

The Komuro-produced "Too Shy Shy Boy!" was released as the album's lead single and became Mizuki's most successful single, selling over 360,000 copies. The original version of the song is not featured on the album, instead an extended remix version was included. "Too Shy Shy Boy!" was the only single released from Arisa II: Shake Your Body for Me, however the title track "Shake Your Body for Me" was also promoted. It served as theme song for the first season of the Fuji TV drama Bokutachi no Drama Series, Hōkago (episodes 1-5), starring Mizuki herself.

Arisa II: Shake Your Body for Me debuted at number 6 on the Oricon Weekly Albums chart with 46,730 copies in its first week, becoming Mizuki's highest charting studio album.

== Commercial performance ==
Arisa II: Shake Your Body for Me debuted on the Oricon Weekly Albums chart at number 6 with 46,730 copies sold in its first week. It spent a second week in the top twenty at number 12, selling 15,410 copies. On its third week, the album dropped to number 19 with 9,990 copies sold. The album charted for eight weeks and has sold a total of 109,250 copies.

== Track listing ==
No.	Title	Lyrics	Music	Length
1.	"Shake Your Body for Me"	Tetsuya Komuro	Komuro	5:28
2.	"Give Me Your Love Tonight"	Komuro	Komuro	4:49
3.	"Koibitotachi no Sonnet" (恋人達のソネット Koibitotachi no Sonetto "Lovers' Sonnet")	Tomoko Ohmoto	Keizō Nakanishi, Takao Konishi	4:15
4.	"Wings of Love"	Yumi Yoshimoto	Chiho Kiyooka	5:11
5.	"Wilders" (WILD･ERS -ワイルダーズ- Wilders (Wairudāzu))	Yoshimoto	Anri	4:07
6.	"Heavenly Blue (Gokujō no Ao)" (HEAVENLY BLUE ～極上の青～)	Masaya Ozeki	Ozeki	4:26
7.	"Aisareterutte Kanjiteru?" (愛されてるって感じてる? "Do You Feel Loved?")	Yoshimoto	Nakanishi, Konishi	4:33
8.	"Too Shy Shy Boy! (Extended New Remix)"	Komuro	Komuro	7:16
9.	"Generation"	Komuro	Komuro	6:34
10.	"He's Gone"	Komuro	Komuro	4:50
Total length:				51:29

== Charts and sales ==
Chart (1992)	Peak position	Sales
Oricon Weekly Albums	6	109,250
