= Dakishimete! =

Single by Arisa Mizuki

from the album Cute
- Released: May 24, 1995
- Genre: Pop
- Length: 5:09
- Label: Nippon Columbia
- Songwriters: Masanori Nagaoka, Yasuhiko Hoshino
- Producer: Takayuki Hijikata

Arisa Mizuki singles chronology
"Anata no Sedai e Kuchizuke o" (1995)	"Dakishimete!" (1995)	"Don't Be Shy" (1995)

"Dakishimete!" (抱きしめて!; lit. "Hold Me!") is the ninth single by Japanese recording artist Arisa Mizuki. It was released on May 24, 1995 as the second single from Mizuki's fourth studio album Cute. Both the title track and B-side, "Zutto Soba ni Ite," were written by Masanori Nagaoka, and composed by Yasuhiko Hoshino. "Dakishimete!" was used in commercials for Umi to Taiyō no Megumi de Arau Body Soap by Shiseido, starring Mizuki herself.

== Chart performance ==
"Dakishimete!" debuted on the Oricon Weekly Singles chart at number 20 with 52,150 copies sold in its first week. The single charted for six weeks and has sold a total of 96,140 copies.

== Track listing ==
All lyrics are written by Masanori Nagaoka; all music is composed by Yasuhiko Hoshino.

No.	Title	Arranger(s)	Length
1.	"Dakishimete!" (抱きしめて! "Hold Me!")	Takayuki Hijikata	5:09
2.	"Zutto Soba ni Ite" (ずっとそばにいて "Always by My Side")	Takao Konishi	5:23
3.	"Dakishimete! (Original Karaoke)"	Hijikata	5:09
Total length:			15:41

== Charts and sales ==
Chart (1995)	Peak position	Sales
Oricon Weekly Singles	20	96,140
