= Eden no Machi =

Single by Arisa Mizuki

from the album Arisa
- A-side: "Eden no Machi"
- B-side: "Kaze wa Fuite Iru"
- Released: August 28, 1991
- Genre: Pop
- Length: 3:54
- Label: Nippon Columbia
- Songwriters: Jun Taguchi, Kaori Okui
- Producers: Okui, Masanori Sasaji

Arisa Mizuki singles chronology
"Densetsu no Shōjo" (1991)	"Eden no Machi" (1991)	"Kaze no Naka de" (1991)

"Eden no Machi" (エデンの都市; lit. "Town of Eden") is the second single by Japanese recording artist Arisa Mizuki. It was released on August 28, 1991 as the second single from Mizuki's debut studio album Arisa. The title song was written by Jun Taguchi and composed and produced by Princess Princess vocalist and guitarist Kaori Okui. The song is Mizuki's only A-side to not have a commercial tie-in.

== Chart performance ==
"Eden no Machi" debuted on the Oricon Weekly Singles chart at number 5 with 59,830 copies sold in its first week. The single charted for eleven weeks and has sold a total of 181,420 copies. "Eden no Machi" was the 10th best-selling single of September 1991 and ranked number 91 on the Oricon Yearly Singles chart.

== Track listing ==
No.	Title	Lyrics	Music	Arranger(s)	Length
1.	"Eden no Machi" (エデンの都市 "Town of Eden")	Jun Taguchi	Kaori Okui	Okui, Masanori Sasaji	3:54
2.	"Kaze wa Fuiteru" (風は吹いてる "The Wind is Blowing")	Kyōko Tomita	Okui	Okui, Sasaji	5:33
Total length:					9:27

== Charts ==
Chart (1991)	Peak position
Oricon Weekly Singles	5
Oricon Monthly Singles	10
Oricon Yearly Singles	91
