= Densetsu no Shōjo =

Single by Arisa Mizuki

from the album Arisa
- A-side: "Densetsu no Shōjo"
- B-side: "Kagami no Naka no Utopia"
- Released: May 15, 1991
- Genre: Pop
- Length: 4:56
- Label: Nippon Columbia
- Songwriter: Amii Ozaki
- Producer: Jun Satō

Arisa Mizuki singles chronology
"Densetsu no Shōjo" (1991)	"Eden no Machi" (1991)

"Densetsu no Shōjo" (伝説の少女; lit. "Legendary Girl") is the first single by Japanese recording artist Arisa Mizuki. It was released on May 15, 1991, as the first single from Mizuki's debut studio album Arisa. The title song was written and composed by Amii Ozaki. It was inspired by Anri's "Olivia o Kikinagara," also produced by Ozaki. The song was used in commercials for the Chasse soft drink by Kirin, starring Mizuki herself.

== Chart performance ==
"Densetsu no Shōjo" debuted on the Oricon Weekly Singles chart at number 5 with 58,150 copies sold in its first week. The single charted for sixteen weeks and has sold a total of 227,340 copies. "Densetsu no Shōjo" was the 12th best-selling single of June 1991 and ranked number 61 on the Oricon Yearly Singles chart.

== Track listing ==
All tracks are written by Amii Ozaki.

No.	Title	Arranger(s)	Length
1.	"Densetsu no Shōjo" (伝説の少女 "Legendary Girl")	Jun Satō	4:56
2.	"Kagami no Naka no Utopia" (鏡の中のUTOPIA "Utopia in the Mirror")	Satō	4:42
Total length:			9:38

== Charts ==
Chart (1991)	Peak position
Oricon Weekly Singles	5
Oricon Monthly Singles	12
Oricon Yearly Singles	61
