= Happy Wake Up! =

Single by Arisa Mizuki

from the album Arisa III: Look
- Released: 3 October 1994
- Genre: Pop, dance
- Length: 4:36
- Label: Nippon Columbia
- Songwriter: Tetsuya Komuro
- Producer: Komuro

Arisa Mizuki singles chronology
"Kimi ga Suki Dakara" (1993)	"Happy Wake Up!" (1994)	"Anata no Sedai e Kuchizuke o" (1995)

"Happy Wake Up!" is the seventh single by Japanese recording artist Arisa Mizuki. It was released on October 3, 1994 as the lead single from Mizuki's third studio album Arisa III: Look. The title track was written and produced by Tetsuya Komuro. "Happy Wake Up!" is Mizuki's second single produced by Komuro. The song was written at Mizuki's request for an upbeat track to sing in concert. It was used in commercials for Knorr Cup Soup by Ajinomoto, starring Mizuki herself. The B-side, "Close to You," was also written and produced by Komuro.

== Chart performance ==
"Happy Wake Up!" debuted on the Oricon Weekly Singles chart at number 3 with 63,170 copies sold in its first week. The single charted for sixteen weeks and has sold a total of 343,790 copies. "Happy Wake Up!" was the 11th best-selling single of October 1994 and 16 November 1994. It ranked number 96 on the Oricon Yearly Singles chart.

== Track listing ==
All tracks are written by Tetsuya Komuro.

No.	Title	Arranger(s)	Length
1.	"Happy Wake Up!"	Komuro, Cozy Kubo	4:36
2.	"Close to You"	Kubo	5:39
3.	"Happy Wake Up! (Original Karaoke)"	Komuro, Kubo	4:36
Total length:			15:27

== Charts ==
Chart (1994)	Peak position
Oricon Weekly Singles	3
Oricon Monthly Singles	11
Oricon Yearly Singles	96
