= Too Shy Shy Boy! =

Single by Arisa Mizuki

from the album Arisa II: Shake Your Body for Me
- Released: May 27, 1992
- Genre: Pop, dance
- Length: 5:00
- Label: Nippon Columbia
- Songwriter: Tetsuya Komuro
- Producer: Komuro

Arisa Mizuki singles chronology
"Kaze no Naka de" (1991)	"Too Shy Shy Boy!" (1992)	"Kotoshi Ichiban Kaze no Tsuyoi Gogo" (1993)

"Too Shy Shy Boy!" is the fourth single by Japanese recording artist Arisa Mizuki. It was released on May 27, 1992 as the lead single from Mizuki's second studio album Shake Your Body for Me. The title track was written and produced by Tetsuya Komuro. It was used in commercials for the soft drink Chasse by Kirin, starring Mizuki herself. Komuro recorded a self-cover of the song for his album Hit Factory. "Too Shy Shy Boy!" is Mizuki's best-selling single. The B-side, "Haru no Tobira," was written and produced by singer-songwriter Midori Karashima and was used in commercials for the Soft MA contact lenses by Menicon, also starring Mizuki.

== Chart performance ==
"Too Shy Shy Boy!" debuted on the Oricon Weekly Singles chart at number 4 with 83,750 copies sold in its first week. The single charted for eighteen weeks and has sold a total of 362,680 copies. "Too Shy Shy Boy!" was the 7th best-selling single in June and July 1992. It ranked number 54 on the Oricon Yearly Singles chart.

== Track listing ==
No.	Title	Lyrics	Music	Arranger(s)	Length
1.	"Too Shy Shy Boy!"	Tetsuya Komuro	Komuro	Komuro, Cozy	5:00
2.	"Haru no Tobira" (春のとびら "Spring Gate")	Midori Karashima	Karashima	Yasuhisa Murase	4:46
3.	"Too Shy Shy Boy! (Original Karaoke)"		Komuro	Komuro, Cozy	4:57
Total length:					14:43

== Charts ==
Chart (1992)	Peak position
Oricon Weekly Singles	4
Oricon Monthly Singles	7
Oricon Yearly Singles	54
