= Amii Ozaki =

Japanese singer-songwriter

Amii Ozaki (尾崎 亜美, Ozaki Ami), real name Misuzu Ohara (小原 美鈴, Ohara Misuzu), is a Japanese singer songwriter born on 19 March 1957 in Kita-ku, Kyoto, Kyoto Prefecture, Japan. She has written music such as Oribia o Kikinagara by Anri and Tenshi no Uinku by Seiko Matsuda, as well as many other songs. Ozaki makes irregular appearances on her friend Akira Kamiya's internet radio show Kamiya Akira Hot Beat Party. Her husband is musician Ray Ohara. Her mother is Akemi Ozaki, a maker of popular handbags and purses made from vintage obi.

== History ==
Ozaki began studying classical piano in 1965 at the age of eight. By the time she was sixteen, after graduating from Kyoto Municipal Kinugasa Junior High School, she had begun writing her own works and participating in an amateur composers club. Her first work, Hitorikko ka Bakko, tells the story of the loneliness of searching for one's mother. She attended Kyoto Prefectural Yamashiro High School.

In 1974, Ozaki participated in her first contest, winning ¥5000 and making a favorable impression on one of the judges who indicated that he thought she was going to become a professional in the near future. She became a DJ for Fōkusu Studio in 1976, and began giving concerts where she played both guitar and piano to accompany her songs. She made her professional debut in 1976 with the Toshiba EMI Express single Contemplation / Winter Poster. Her stage name "Ami" comes from the French word for "friend".

== Discography ==
Listed alphabetically by year.

=== Singles ===
1970s

- Contemplation / Winter Poster (冥想/冬のポスター, Meisō / Fuyu no Posutā) (1976, Toshiba EMI)
- Journey / Unexpected Sunlight (旅/偶然サンライト, Tabi / Gūzen Sanraito) (1976, Toshiba EMI)
- My Pure Lady / Sunlight (マイ・ピュア・レディ/サンライト, Mai Pyua Redi / Sanraito) (1977, Toshiba EMI)
- First Love Rain Shower / For the Sake of Saying Goodbye (初恋の通り雨/さよならを言うために, Katsukoi no Tōri Ame / Sayonara o Iu Tame ni) (1977, Toshiba EMI)
- Stop Motion / Last Kiss (ストップモーション/ラストキッス, Sutoppu Mōshon / Rasuto Kissu) (1978, Toshiba EMI)
- Developing Storm / Raimu Raito (嵐を起こして/来夢来人, Arashi o Okoshite / Raimu Raito) (1978, Toshiba EMI)
- You Are Shocking Shine / I Don't Want to Sing of Love (あなたはショッキングシャイン/私は愛を唄わない, Anata wa Shokkingu Shain / Watashi wa o Utawanai) (1978, Toshiba EMI)
- Jessie / Carousel (ジェシー/回転木馬, Jeshī / Kaitenmokuba) (1979, Toshiba EMI)
- Slow Dancing / Makeup the Heart (スローダンシング/心にメイクアップ, Surō Danshingu / Kokoro ni Meiku Appu) (1979, Toshiba EMI)
- Sparkling Feeling (キラメキFeeling, Kirameki Fīringu) (1979, Toshiba EMI, promotional single never sold in stores)

1980s

- 21st Century Cinderella / Cinematic Doll (21世紀のシンデレラ/CINEMATIC DOLL, Nijūichi Seiki Shinderera / Shinematikku Dōru) (1980, Pony Canyon)
- Serenade / Sweet Christmas Song (蒼夜曲(セレナーデ)/SWEET CHRISTMAS SONG, Serenāde / Suīto Kurisumasu Songu) (1980, Pony Canyon)
- Love Is Easy / My Shiny Town (1981, Pony Canyon)
- Deep / Ocean (Woman) to Sky (Man) (Deep/海(女)～空(男)へ, Dīpu / Kai (Onna) ～ Sora (Otoko) e) (1981, Pony Canyon)
- My Song for You / Foggy Night (1982, Pony Canyon)
- I'm A Lady Tiger / It's Easy If You Try (1982, Pony Canyon)
- Thrill in the Night: Like Angels / Mai (Thrill in the Night～天使のように～/舞夢, Suriru in za Naito: Tenshi no yō ni / Mai) (1983, Pony Canyon)
- Love within Love: Love Is Gonna Get You/ Tender Light (愛に恋 Love Is Gonna Get You/Tender Light, Ai ni Koi: Rabu Izu Gona Getto Yū / Tendā Raito) (1983, Pony Canyon)
- Beloved Marine Park / Moon Beach: Maya Maya Beach (恋するマリンパーク/月の浜辺～マヤマヤ・ビーチ～, Koisuru Marin Pāku / Tsuki no Hamabe: Maya Maya Bīchi) (1984, Pony Canyon)
- Judy / Iron Woman (Judy/鉄の女, Judī / Tetsu no Onna) (1984, Pony Canyon)
- Ponkikki Hatena Taisō: Hatena no Kuni kara (ポンキッキハテナたいそう～ハテナの国から～) (1985, Pony Canyon)
- Whispered "I Love You" / Air Mail (そっと"I Love You"/Air Mail, Sotto "I Rabu Yū" / Eā Meiru) (1986, Pony Canyon)
- Wuper Dancing / Wuper Dancing (in Papi) (Wuper Dancing/Wuper Dancing(パピ語), Uppā Danshingu / Uppā Danshingu (Papigo) (1985, Papi, Pony Canyon)
- Rainbow Tree / Time Lullaby (Rainbow Tree/時の子守唄, Reinbō Torī / Toki no Komoriuta) (1987, Pony Canyon)
- Change Sadness to a Beat: Rise and Shine / Don't Make Me Count All the Sheep in the World (悲しみはBEATに変えて～Rise and Shine～/世界中の羊数えさせないで, Kanashimi wa Bīto ni Kaete: Raizu ando Shain / Sekaijū no Hitsuji Kazoesasenaide) (1988, Pony Canyon)
- The Rain Doesn't Stop / Angel Comes Along (The Evening the Angel Returned) (雨は止まない/Angel Comes Along (天使が帰ってきた夜), Ame wa Tomanai / Enjeru Kamusu Arōngu (Tenshi ga Kaettekita Yoru)) (1988, Pony Canyon)
- Greetings from Shangri-la (桃源郷からコンニチハ, Tōgenkyō kara Konnichi wa) (1989, Peach Princess, Pony Canyon)

1990s

- Endless Dream (1990, Pony Canyon)
- Southern Cross (1990, Pony Canyon)
- Heart of Glass (1992, Peach Princess Band, Pony Canyon)
- My Best Friends (1992, Hira-o-Saki (with Eri Hiramatsu and Kenjirō Sakiya), Pony Canyon)
- Walking in the Rain / The Legendary Girl (Walking in the Rain/伝説の少女, Uōkingu in za Rein / Densetsu no Shōjo) (1992, Pony Canyon)
- Divine Request / Highway Star (神様お願い/Highway Star, Kami-sama Onegai / Haiuei Sutā) (1993, Peach Princess Band, Pony Canyon)
- Please Stop the Pendulum of Time / Gourmet Paradise (時の振り子を止めてごらん/グルメ天国, Toki no Furiko o Yamete Goran / Gurume Tengoku) (1993, Pony Canyon)
- Voice / The Wind's Native Land (VOICE/風のNative Land, Voisu / Kaze no Neitivu Rando) (1994, Pony Canyon)
- Feeling Like I Want to Cry / Invitation Card (泣きたいような気分で/Invitation Card, Nakitai yō na Kibun de / Inbiteishon Kādo) (1994, Pony Canyon)
- Ballistic Vector / Amaranth (衝撃のベクトル/Amaranth, Shōgeki no Bekutoru / Amaransu) (1995, Pony Canyon)
- Miracle / Treasure Island (奇蹟/宝島, Kiseki / Takarajima) (1997, Toshiba EMI)
- Building Love / Let's Imagine (愛の構造/Let's Imagine, Ai no Kōzō) (1998, Toshiba EMI)
- Tomorrow Will Be Sunny for Sure / Lead the Way to Love (明日はきっと晴れるだろう/Lead The Way To Love, Ashita wa Kitto Hareru Darō) (1998, Toshiba EMI)
- I Wanna Do More/Should I Do? (1999, from Magic Users Club, Toshiba EMI)

2000s

- Fighting Wing (戦う翼, Tatakau Tsubasa) (2005, Columbia Music Entertainment)
- Wait for Me, Okay? / Magical Way / Guardian Star (待っていてね/Magical Way/Guardian Star, Matteite ne / Majikaru Uei / Gādian Sutā) (2005, Columbia Music Entertainment)

=== Albums ===
1970s

- Shady (1976, Toshiba EMI)
- Mind Drops (1977, Toshiba EMI)
- Prismy (1978, Toshiba EMI)
- Stop Motion (1978, Toshiba EMI)
- Little Fantasy (1979, Toshiba EMI)

1980s

- Meridian-Melon (1980, Pony Canyon)
- Air Kiss (1981, Pony Canyon)
- Hot Baby (1981, Pony Canyon)
- Shot (1982, Pony Canyon)
- Miracle (1983, Pony Canyon)
- Points (1983, Pony Canyon)
- Plastic Garden (1984, Pony Canyon)
- #10 Mew (10番目のミュー, Jūbanme no Myū) (1985, Pony Canyon)
- Kids (1986, Pony Canyon)
- Points-2 (1986, Pony Canyon)
- Time Map (時間地図, Jikan Chizu) (1987, Pony Canyon)
- Amii Remix World (1988, Pony Canyon)
- Dinner's Ready (1988, Pony Canyon)
- Lapis Lazuli (1988, Pony Canyon)

1990s

- Natural Agency (1991, Pony Canyon)
- First Battle (初陣, Uijin) (1992, Peach Princess Band (桃姫BAND, Momohime Bando), Pony Canyon)
- Hot Baby with David Foster (1992, Canyon)
- Points-3 (1992, Pony Canyon)
- Moon Magic (月の魔法, Tsuki no Mahō) (1993, Pony Canyon)
- Topaz (1994, Pony Canyon)
- Special (1997, Toshiba EMI)
- Wi^{2}sh (1997, Toshiba EMI)
- Arrows in My Eyes (1998, Toshiba EMI

2000s

- The Delta-Wing I (2000, Oak Records/Omagatoki)
- Amii-Phonic (2001, For Life Records)
- Pia Noir (2002, BMG Fan House)
- Hospitality. (おもてなし。, Omotenashi.) (2004, Columbia Music Entertainment)
- Triple Circle (三重マル, Sanjū Maru) (2006, Columbia Music Entertainment)
