= Alisa Mizuki =

Japanese actress, singer, and model (born 1976)

- 観月 ありさ
- Born: December 5, 1976 (age 49); Tokyo, Japan
- Other names: Arisa, Alisser
- Education: Meiji University, Japan
- Occupations: Actress; singer; model
- Years active: 1981–present
- Spouse: Koji Aoyama (m. 2015)
- Musical career
- Genres: Pop; dance
- Instrument: Vocals
- Labels: Nippon Columbia; Avex Tune
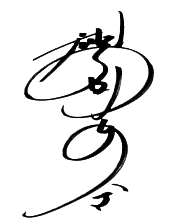
- Website: Official website Alisa Mizuki's signature

Alisa Mizuki (観月 ありさ, Mizuki Arisa; born December 5, 1976) is a Japanese actress and singer. She began her career as a child model and gained attention for starring in commercials for Fujicolor, among other brands, in the early 1990s.

She released her debut single "Densetsu no Shōjo" in 1991, for which she won the Newcomer Award at the 33rd Japan Record Awards. Mizuki has recorded material penned by Yumi Matsutoya, Anri and Tetsuya Komuro, the latter of whom produced her signature song, "Too Shy Shy Boy!".

Mizuki made her film debut in Reiko, Psyche Resurrected (1991), which garnered her the Japan Academy Film Prize for Newcomer of the Year. As an actress, she is best known for her portrayal of Izumi Asakura in the comedy series Nurse no Oshigoto (1996–2002), which spawned a feature film. She was further nominated for a Japan Academy Film Prize for her lead role in My House (2003).

In 2010, Mizuki set the Guinness World Record for being the leading actress in a television drama series for nineteen consecutive years.

== History ==
Born in Nerima, Tokyo to Japanese-American parents, Mizuki began modelling for magazines and appearing in commercials at the age of four. She become a child model in 1981 and first appeared in television series in 1983, but made her official acting debut in 1991, in the Fuji TV drama Mō Dare mo Aisanai. In 1992, Mizuki landed her first leading role in the Fuji TV drama Hōkago. She later starred in the popular series Nurse no Oshigoto, which, after producing four seasons, was also made into a film, Nurse no Oshigoto: The Movie (2002). Mizuki won the Japan Academy Award for Best Newcomer for her performance in Reiko, Psyche Resurrected (1991) and later earned a Japan Academy Award nomination for Best Actress for her role in My House (2003).

In May 1991, Mizuki made her singing debut with the song "Densetsu no Shōjo," released through Nippon Columbia. The same year, she earned the Japan Record Award for Best Newcomer. In 1997, Mizuki officially changed the romanization of her first name from Arisa to Alisa. She left Nippon Columbia and signed with her current record label, the Avex Group subsidiary Avex Tune. As of 2011, Mizuki has released twenty-seven singles, six studio albums, and five compilation albums and has sold over 3 million total records. Mizuki is part of the group of artists that were majorly produced by Tetsuya Komuro, commonly known as the TK Family.

Mizuki has starred in several drama series for which she has also sung the theme songs to, such as Help!, Boy Hunt, and most recently Saitō-san. In 2010, Mizuki earned a place in the Guinness World Records book as the only actress to have starred in leading television roles for nineteen consecutive years.

Alongside Rie Miyazawa and Riho Makise, Mizuki was one of the top idols of the 1990s and due to their popularity and ubiquity, the trio were nicknamed "3M" by the media. She is also a successful runway and print model.

Mizuki was the inspiration behind Sailor Moon character Rei Hino, and her song "Kaze mo Sora mo Kitto..." would be used as the ending theme for Sailor Moon Sailor Stars.

== Personal life ==
On March 21, 2015, she announced that she married Koji Aoyama, a president of a construction company.

== Discography ==
- Arisa (1991)
- Arisa II: Shake Your Body for Me (1992)
- Arisa III: Look (1994)
- Cute (1995)
- Innocence (1999)
- SpeciAlisa (2011)

== Filmography ==
=== Film ===
| Year | Title | Role | Notes | Ref. |
|---|---|---|---|---|
| 1991 | Reiko, Psyche Resurrected | Reiko Kudō | Lead role | |
| 1996 | Seventh of July, Sunny Day | Hinata Mochizuki | Lead role | |
| 2002 | I Am a Nurse: The Movie | Izumi Asakura | Lead role | |
| 2003 | My House | Kanoko | Lead role | |
| 2015 | Doraemon: Nobita's Space Heroes | Meba (voice) | | |
| 2021 | Daughter of Lupin the Movie | Rei Mikumo | | |
| 2023 | Red Shoes | | | |
| 2024 | What If Shogun Ieyasu Tokugawa Was to Become the Prime Minister | Murasaki Shikibu | | |

=== Television ===
| Year | Title | Role | Notes | Ref. |
|---|---|---|---|---|
| 1991 | I'll Never Love Anyone Anymore | Yayoi Tashiro | | |
| 1996–2002 | I Am a Nurse | Izumi Asakura | Lead role; 4 seasons | |
| 1997 | Precious Friends | Miwa Yūki | Lead role | |
| 2009 | Party of One | Satomi Akiyama | Lead role | |
| 2009–2013 | Sazae-san | Sazae Fuguta | Lead role; 4 television films | |
| 2011 | The Hanawa Sisters | Takemi Hanawa | Lead role | |
| 2014 | Night School Teacher, Sakura | Sakura Yoruno | Lead role | |
| 2014 | I Am a Nurse Special | Izumi Asakura | Lead role; 2 television films | |
| 2017 | A Corpse Is Buried Under Sakurako's Feet | Sakurako Kujō | Lead role | |
| 2024 | Okura: Cold Case Investigation | Shu Ibuse | | |

=== Dubbing ===
- Hotel Transylvania 3: Summer Vacation (Ericka Van Helsing)
- Hotel Transylvania: Transformania (Ericka Van Helsing)

== Awards and nominations ==
| Year | Award | Category | Work(s) | Result | Ref. |
|---|---|---|---|---|---|
| 1992 | 15th Japan Academy Film Prize | Newcomer of the Year | Reiko, Psyche Resurrected | Won | |
| 2004 | 27th Japan Academy Film Prize | Best Actress | My House | Nominated | |
