= Fighter (Namie Amuro song) =

- CD+DVD, and digital cover that commercializes the single.

Single by Namie Amuro

from the album Finally
- A-side: "Dear Diary"
- Released: October 26, 2016
- Recorded: 2016; LAB Recorders (Minato-ku, Tokyo, Japan)
- Genre: Electronic; dance
- Length: 3:21
- Label: Avex Trax; Dimension Point
- Songwriter(s): Emyli
- Producer(s): Emyli; Reason

Namie Amuro singles chronology
| "Hero" (2016) | "Dear Diary" / "Fighter" (2016) | "Just You and I" (2017) |

"Fighter" is a song recorded by Japanese singer Namie Amuro, released as a double A-side single with "Dear Diary". It was released on October 26, 2016 via Dimension Point and Avex Trax in two CD formats, and a DVD package; a digital release was made available for consumption on November 16. The single serves as the insert song to the Japanese drama–horror film Death Note: Light Up the New World, and the theme song to its accompanying spin-off series Death Note: New Generation (2016). "Fighter" was written, composed and produced by Japanese vocalist Emyli, with additional production credits to Reason.

Originally, one of the film producers, Takahiro Sato, intended to hire a Western musical act, namely Red Hot Chili Peppers or Lenny Kravitz, to record the themes songs. He came to believe that the series was already popular around the world; he changed his mind and felt the need to promote a foreign Japanese artist. Musically, "Fighter" is an "aggressive" electronic dance number that incorporates heavy usage of synthesizers and keyboards. The lyrical content delves into the point of view from the film's female protagonist, Misa Amane, and is heavily based on self-empowerment and courage.

"Fighter" received positive reviews from music critics, who complimented its dance nature and Amuro's delivery. Additionally, some reviews noticed the singers' ability to re-invent, and cited the single as a significant factor. Its popularity, alongside many other of her previous singles in 2016 brought her a nomination for Best Female Artist at the Space Shower Music Awards. Commercially, both recordings experienced success in Japan, peaking at number three on the daily and weekly Oricon Singles Chart, alongside scoring top ten positions on three component Billboard charts in that region.

An accompanying music video was directed by Higashi Hiroaki and released on Amuro's YouTube channel, showing the singer inside a large castle holding several corridors and mystical rooms. Furthermore, the main chorus sections feature Amuro in a large white ballroom with LED screens. Like "Dear Diary", the visuals are heavily developed with computer generated imagery. In order to promote the track, "Fighter" was broadcast on several Japanese television shows and was included on the singers 2016–17 Live Style tour in Japan.

== Background and composition ==
"Fighter" (2016)
A 21-second sample of "Fighter", which was described by critics as an "aggressive" dance track with elements of EDM. In this verse, it has Amuro delivering rapping techniques rather than singing.

In December 2015, Amuro returned to releasing non-album singles with "Red Carpet", months after the distribution of her eleventh studio album Genic (2015). Following these singles were "Mint" (May 2016) and "Hero" (July 2016), two numbers that served as a television theme song, and the opening track to the 2016 Summer Olympics and Paralympics, hosted in Rio de Janeiro for the Japanese entry. A month after the latter song's release, Amuro confirmed her involvement with the Japanese drama–horror film Death Note: Light Up the New World, based on the anime and manga series of the same name, and intended for a late-October theatrical run. Originally, the film's co-producer Takahiro Sato wanted to enlist a Western musical act to provide songs to the movie, and selected American band Red Hot Chili Peppers or American musician Lenny Kravitz as front-runners. However, knowing that the series was already popular outside of Japan, Sato decided to enlist Amuro in order to get the audience to recognized the "power of foreign artists" and also promote her work overseas. Amuro herself expressed her gratitude for participating in the film's soundtrack. The singer revealed the titles to be "Dear Diary" and "Fighter", which served as a double A-side; this is her first to do so since 2014's "Big Boys Cry/Beautiful".

"Fighter" was written, composed and produced by Japanese vocalist Emyli, with additional production credits to musician Reason. Furthermore, Emyli provided background vocals to both this track and "Dear Diary", and were recorded by Wataru Namifusa at LAB Recordings in Minato-ku, Tokyo, Japan. According to Amuro's website, "Fighter" was described as an aggressive electronic dance number that incorporates heavy usage of synthesizers and keyboards. The lyrical content delves into the point of view from the film's character, Misa Amane, whom serves as the accompanying female protagonist alongside Light Yagami, and is heavily based on self-empowerment and courage. During the second verse, the singer incorporates a rapping technique in comparison to the remaining parts where she sings, as noted by Japanese critic Kanako Hayawaka. Regarding the singles relation towards the film, Amuro believed that both "Dear Diary" and "Fighter" shared similar themes but were expressed in different styles of music. "Fighter" is Amuro's first English-language single since 2013's "Ballerina".

== Release and reception ==
A snippet of "Fighter" was published through the trailer of the film in September 2016. Subsequently, it was released as Amuro's seventh non-consecutive album single on October 26, 2016 via Dimension Point and Avex Trax. The labels distributed it in three physical formats; two standard compact discs, and a DVD bundle. All formats, apart from a special picture disc version, included the two A-sides and their instrumentation compositions; the picture disc only included the first two tracks, and availability was limited. Furthermore, the DVD included both music videos to each track. The CD artwork is an outtake shot from the music video of "Dear Diary", whilst the CD and DVD cover, representing "Fighter", features Amuro in dark clothing and make-up, surrounded by black feathers. The picture disc, featuring Amuro and the film's mascot character Ryuk, was published throughout selected Japanese retails and at her 2016–2017 Live Style concert venues. Two bonus posters were distributed through CDJapan for those whom pre-ordered the CD and DVD versions. Promotional pop-up cards were made available at her Live Style venues, which incorporated an image of the singer and promoted aesthetics of Halloween 2016. On November 16, nearly three weeks since its initial release, "Fighter" and its instrumental version were issued solely for digital consumption.

"Fighter" received positive reviews from music critics. Japanese critic Kanako Hayawaka enjoyed the track, commending its dance ready nature and production; additionally, she also highlighted Amuro's vocal performance. Similarly, an editor at CD Journal commended the dance nature of the song, and expressed delight towards Amuro's ability to continuously "update herself." Rikako Morikawa from OKMusic.jp commended its "aggressive" sound and songwriting, whilst an editor at Excite.co.jp described both tracks as "charm[s]". Another commentator from SBS PopAsia said that "Fighter" is a "thumping dance track that is as catchy as it is exhilarating." Masahiro Higashide, whom plays one of the film's protagonist characters, Tsukuru Mishima, expressed his enjoyment of the track upon its release.

== Commercial performance ==
Commercially, "Fighter" experienced success in Japan. It opened at number four on the daily Oricon Singles Chart, but slipped to number six the following day. On October 28, it peaked at number three and sold 4,553 copies. (Note: The charts provided by the Oricon Style are dated two days prior; although "Dear Diary" / "Fighter" reached number three on October 27, it is accessible/archived on October 29, 2016.) Based on the first seven-days, the single entered the weekly chart at number three with 45,000 copies sold, making this Amuro's highest first-week sales since "Go Round"/"Yeah-Oh!" in 2012. (Note: "Go Round" / "Yeah-Oh!" debuted at number four on the Oricon Singles Chart with 46,983 sales sold.) By the end of October 2016, Oricon ranked the song at number 15. It slipped to number 14 the following week, selling 8,911 units, and fell again to number 22, marking its final week inside the top 40 chart. In total, "Fighter" spent 13 weeks inside the top 200 chart, and has sold 63,974 copies in Japan. At the end of 2016, the organisation placed the single as the 89th best-selling single.

Furthermore, "Fighter" generated minimal impact than "Dear Diary" on three component charts published by Billboard Japan. It entered the Radio Songs chart at number 73, and at number four on the Top Singles Sales chart. Although it fell out the top 100 on the former category, it slipped to number 13 on the Top Singles Sales chart. The following week—dated October 21, 2016—the A-side fell to number 23, and spent a total of five weeks in the chart. After the tracks digital availability on November 16, "Fighter" entered the Japan Hot 100 at number 15, the first of two other additions of the singers ("Dear Diary" at number 30 and "Hero" at number 81). Unable to reach higher, it slipped to number 40 and marked its final appearance on December 12, stalling at number 82.

== Music video ==
The accompanying music video for "Fighter" was directed by Hiroaki Higashi and published on Amuro's official YouTube channel. In an extensive analysis with Arama Japan, a staff member explained;

The video takes place in a floating cubical fortress chained above a body of water. The camera traverses through the interior where we meet Amuro in a long, winding hallway with doors leading to different dimension-defying locations. Between choreography (which is really… something else), she soon finds herself in a bright dining room where the shinigami Ryuk sits with a plate apples.

It opens with the camera scoping over a forest, series of mountains and fields. A square-shaped castle appears, being supported by chains and rocks, whilst lifted above a lake. As the camera passes through the entrance—filled with staircases and rooms— it zooms into Amuro walking along a vast hallway. Curiously, the singer opens several doors which showcases visions of her in different landscapes; for example, the first room has Amuro standing in a white room, filled with clouds, feathers and support systems that resemble Ancient Greek architecture. In this scene, the film's character, Arma, makes an appearance. The second room shows the singer at a dining table with the film's character Ryuk, as they look upon each other questioningly yet aggressively. A third and final separate scene has staring out of window, seeing yet another vision of herself in a mystical forest with Bepo, another character from Death Note.

The bridge section of the video has a distance shot of the castle at night, having the singer stand on the rooftop. Additionally, a winged-Ryuk oversees Amuro from the moon and sends her an apple—a staple item for the character's aesthetic. Eventually, a small intercut scene has each character in the dining room with Amuro. The visual ends with Amuro seated and Ryuk behind her, eventually expanding out on the castles exterior and landscape. For each chorus and other spontaneous intercut, Amuro and four background dancers perform in a grey-coloured ballroom, surrounded with black feathers, historical architecture and LED screens on the floor. A promotional teaser of "Dear Diary", alongside a musical snippet of "Fighter", was uploaded on Amuro's YouTube channel. Furthermore, an official lyric video was leaked online, depicting footage of the original video with red–black–white vectors and graphics.

== Promotion ==
In order to promote the single, several Japanese television shows broadcast special commemorations for Amuro, the accompanying film and the respective music videos to "Dear Diary" and "Fighter"; on October 26, Music On! Japan TV hosted a visual special, including "Dear Diary" and "Fighter" and her previous releases. Likewise, Space Shower TV premiered a music video special dedicated to the two singles and footage from the Death Note movie. The single was included on the singer's 2016–17 Live Style tour in Japan; it was revealed two months prior in August 2016.

== Track listing and formats ==
CD single

1. "Dear Diary" — 3:30
2. "Fighter" — 3:28
3. "Dear Diary" (Instrumental) — 3:30
4. "Fighter" (Instrumental) — 3:28

DVD single

1. "Dear Diary" — 3:30
2. "Fighter" — 3:28
3. "Dear Diary" (Instrumental) — 3:30
4. "Fighter" (Instrumental) — 3:28
5. "Dear Diary" (music video) — 3:30
6. "Fighter" (music video) — 3:32

Limited edition CD

1. "Dear Diary" — 3:30
2. "Fighter" — 3:28

Digital download 1

1. "Fighter" — 3:28

Digital download 2

1. "Fighter" (Instrumental) — 3:28

== Credits and personnel ==
Credits adapted from the liner notes of the single's CD and DVD release.

Recording and management

- Recorded by Wataru Namifura at LAB Recordings, Japan in 2016; mixed and mastered by D.O.I. and Tom Coyne at Sterling Studios, New York City, New York. Management by Stella88 and Avex Trax.

Credits

- Namie Amuro – vocals
- Emyli – background vocals, songwriting, composing, production
- Reason – composing, production
- Hide Kawada – A&R
- Tatsuya Fukuda – art direction, design
- Wataru Yoshioka – design
- Yasunari Kikuma – photographer
- Akemi Nakano – hair & make-up
- Satomi Kurihara – hair & make-up
- Akira Noda – stylist
- Higashi Hiroaki – music video director

== Charts and sales ==
=== Japanese charts ===
| Chart (2016–17) | Peak position |
|---|---|
| Japan Hot 100 (Billboard) | 15 |
| Japan Radio Songs (Billboard) | 73 |
| Japan Top Single Sales (Billboard) | 4 |
| Japan Daily Chart (Oricon) | 3 |
| Japan Weekly Chart (Oricon) | 3 |
| Japan Weekly Chart (Oricon) | 15 |

=== Year-end charts ===
| Chart (2016) | Peak position |
|---|---|
| Japan Yearly Chart (Oricon) | 89 |

=== Sales ===
| Region | Certification | Certified units/sales |
|---|---|---|
| Japan Dear Diary/Fighter | — | 59,768 |

== Release history ==
| Region | Date | Format | Label |
|---|---|---|---|
| Japan | October 26, 2016 | CD; DVD | Avex Trax; Dimension Point |
| Japan | November 16, 2016 | Digital download | Avex Music Creative Inc. |
| Australia | November 16, 2016 | Digital download | Avex Music Creative Inc. |
| New Zealand | November 16, 2016 | Digital download | Avex Music Creative Inc. |
| United Kingdom | November 16, 2016 | Digital download | Avex Music Creative Inc. |
| Ireland | November 16, 2016 | Digital download | Avex Music Creative Inc. |
| Germany | November 16, 2016 | Digital download | Avex Music Creative Inc. |
| France | November 16, 2016 | Digital download | Avex Music Creative Inc. |
| Spain | November 16, 2016 | Digital download | Avex Music Creative Inc. |
| Taiwan | November 16, 2016 | Digital download | Avex Music Creative Inc. |

== See also ==
- Music of Death Note: Light Up the New World
