= Dear Diary (Namie Amuro song) =

- CD cover artwork.

Single by Namie Amuro

from the album Finally
- A-side: "Fighter"
- Released: October 26, 2016
- Recorded: 2016
- Genre: Pop
- Length: 3:29
- Label: Dimension Point
- Songwriters: Matthew Tishler; Felicia Barton; Aaron Benward; Tiger
- Producer: Tishler

Namie Amuro singles chronology
"Hero" (2016)	"Dear Diary" / "Fighter" (2016)	"Just You and I" (2017)

"Dear Diary" is a song by Japanese singer Namie Amuro. Dimension Point released it as a double A-side single with "Fighter" on October 26, 2016. Furthermore, it serves as the fourth single from Amuro's seventh greatest hits album and final music release, Finally (2017). Both served as themes songs for the 2016 Japanese live-action film Death Note: Light Up the New World, which was inspired by the manga series Death Note. Takahiro Sato, the film's co-producer, approached Amuro about providing theme songs to help her music gain international exposure. "Dear Diary" was written by Matthew Tishler, Felicia Barton, Aaron Benward, and Tiger, and produced by Tishler. Frequent collaborator Emyli provided backing vocals to the track.

Musically, it is a pop ballad with lyrics that intertwine with the film's themes and concepts, highlighting the journey from sadness to strength. Music critics praised "Dear Diary" for the singer's vocal abilities and overall production quality. Commercially, "Dear Diary" was a success in Japan, peaking at number three on the Oricon Singles Chart and number seven on the Japan Hot 100. Despite modest physical sales, the song was certified gold by the Recording Industry Association of Japan (RIAJ) for exceeding 100,000 downloads. Ryouhei Shingu directed a music video with Amuro walking along a beach with various special effects imagery. To promote the single, "Dear Diary" was added to Amuro's Live Style 88 tour setlist and later included in the tour's live release.

== Background and development ==
In June 2015, Amuro released her twelfth and final studio album, Genic, which was a critical and commercial success in Japan. After promoting the album with her Livegenic Tour in Asia, Amuro resumed releasing singles, beginning with "Red Carpet" in December, then "Mint" in May 2016, and "Hero" in July. One month later, Amuro confirmed that she would participate in recording the theme songs for the 2016 Japanese live-action film Death Note: Light Up the New World, an adaptation of the manga series Death Note. Takahiro Sato, the film's co-producer, planned to work with Western artists to provide music for the film, citing Red Hot Chili Peppers and Lenny Kravitz as examples. However, knowing that the series was already well-known around the world, Sato decided to enlist Amuro to help international audiences recognise the "power of foreign artists" while also promoting her work. Amuro expressed her gratitude for participating in the film's soundtrack. She confirmed the songs "Dear Diary" and "Fighter" as double A-side singles; "Dear Diary" served as the film's main theme song, and "Fighter" was used throughout the film.

== Composition ==
"Dear Diary"
"Dear Diary is a pop ballad with lyrics highlighting the journey from sadness to strength.

"Dear Diary" was written by Matthew Tishler, Felicia Barton, Aaron Benward, and Tiger, and produced by Tishler. Frequent collaborator Emyli provided backing vocals to the song. Amuro recorded it with Wataru Namifusa at LAB Recordings in Minato, Tokyo, Japan; D.O.I. mixed it; and Tom Coyne mastered it at Sterling Studios in New York City. The song is recorded in Japanese with some English lyrics. "Dear Diary" is a pop ballad whose lyrics are intertwined with the film's title and recurring theme, and critics agree on the ballad influence. According to Japanese critic Kanako Hayawaka, the track highlighted Amuro's "painful" delivery, which was accompanied by a gentle piano riff, and featured a theme change from "sadness to strength". Hayawaka also believed that "Dear Diary" and "Fighter" had similar themes, but were expressed in different musical styles.

== Release and music video ==
Still from the music video showing Amuro in front of a beach view with various computer-generated imagery of inhabited glass bottles.

A snippet of "Dear Diary" first appeared in the film's trailer and was later leaked online in low quality on September 26, 2016. Dimension Point released it alongside "Fighter" on October 26, 2016, as the fourth single from Amuro's seventh greatest hits album and final music release, Finally (2017). All formats included both songs and instrumental versions, while the DVD version included both music videos for each track, and a limited edition picture disc version contained only the two original songs. Each format featured three artworks: the CD featured an outtake shot from the "Dear Diary" music video; the DVD version featured an outtake image from the "Fighter" music video; and the limited edition cover featured Amuro in the "Fighter" music video with the film's character Ryuk behind her. Two days later, the single was released in Taiwan. "Dear Diary" has only appeared on one of Amuro's concert tours, the Live Style 88 tour, which was followed by a live release.

Ryouhei Shingu directed the music video for "Dear Diary”, and was first shown on Music On! TV and Space Shower TV. It starts with a diary and a quill on a desk, the pages blown by a gust of wind. The scene fades to black, revealing Amuro on the beach before dawn, surrounded by large driftwood and lanterns. Several intercepting shots show beach waves approaching shore and Amuro singing the song. By the first chorus, a distant shot of the ocean reveals glass bottles that house multiple homes, people, and animals. As the song progresses, the sun rises, and the people inside the bottles express their sorrow from various angles. As the final chorus begins, the bottle tops melt away, revealing a large rift of water beneath a newly risen sun and multicoloured clouds. The visual concludes with Amuro gazing into the distance and turning to face the camera. (Note: "Dear Diary" video description taken from its appearance on the Blu-Ray and DVD version of Finally (2017))

== Reception ==
Music critics gave "Dear Diary" positive reviews. SBS PopAsia praised the song's inclusion in the film, saying they were "over the moon" about it. Japanese critic Kanako Hayawaka called the song a "beautiful song" for its lyrical content and composition. Japanese website Excite described "Dear Diary" and "Fighter" as "charm[s]", while Japanese magazine CDJournal described the song as "moving" and a "magnificent ballad". It achieved success in Japan. Together with "Fighter," the singles debuted at number four on the daily Oricon Singles Chart, eventually peaking at number three. It debuted at number three on the weekly Oricon Singles Chart, selling 45,000 units, her best first-week performance since "Go Round" / "Yeah-Oh!" in 2012. By the end of October, it peaked at number 15 on their monthly chart. It spent 15 weeks on the charts and sold 64,486 units. "Dear Diary" also peaked at number seven on the Japan Hot 100, number four on the Top Singles Sales, and number 15 on the Radio Songs chart, provided by Billboard Japan. The song was certified gold by the Recording Industry Association of Japan (RIAJ) for exceeding 100,000 downloads.

== Track listing ==
CD / digital format
No.	Title	Length
1.	"Dear Diary"	3:29
2.	"Fighter"	3:27
3.	"Dear Diary" (Instrumental)	3:29
4.	"Fighter" (Instrumental)	3:27

Limited picture disc
No.	Title	Length
1.	"Dear Diary"	3:29
2.	"Fighter"	3:27

DVD
No.	Title	Length
1.	"Dear Diary" (Music video)
2.	"Fighter" (Music video)

== Credits and personnel ==
Credits adapted from the liner notes.

Recording and management

- Recorded by Wataru Namifura at LAB Recordings, Japan; mixed by D.O.I.; mastered by Tom Coyne at Sterling Studios, New York City. Management by Stella88 and Avex Trax.

Personnel

- Namie Amuro – vocals
- Matthew Tishler – songwriting, production
- Felicia Barton – songwriting
- Aaron Benward – songwriting
- Tiger – songwriting
- Ats – arrangement, keyboards, programming
- Sayuri Yano – string arrangements
- Tomoko Jono – violin
- Naoko Ishibashi – violin
- Akane Irie – violin
- Yuko Kajitani – violin
- Naotaka Tamura – violin
- Ayumu Koshikawa – violin
- Ken Okabe – violin
- Daisuke Yamamoto – violin
- Akiko Shimauchi – violin
- Shoko Miki – viola
- Sayo Takimoto – viola
- Matsutami Endo – cello
- Azura Haraguchi – cello
- Masatake Osato – string recording engineer
- Ryoma Mokonuma – assistant engineer
- Yuki Iwabuchi – music creative director
- Emyli – background vocals, vocal director
- Ryouhei Shingu – music video director
- Tatsuya Fukuda – art direction, design
- Wataru Yoshioka – design
- Yasunari Kikuma – photographer
- Akemi Nakano – hair & make-up
- Satomi Kurihara – hair & make-up
- Akira Noda – stylist

== Charts ==
Chart performance for "Dear Diary"
Chart (2016)	Peak position
Japan Hot 100 (Billboard)	7
Japan Weekly (Oricon)	3
Japan Monthly (Oricon)	15

== Certifications ==
Region	Certification	Certified units/sales
Japan (RIAJ) Digital	Gold	100,000^{*}
^{*} Sales figures based on certification alone.

== Release history ==
"Dear Diary"/"Fighter" release history
Region	Date	Format	Label	Ref(s).
Various	October 26, 2016	Digital download; streaming	Dimension Point	
Japan	October 26, 2016	CD single; DVD	Dimension Point	
Taiwan	October 28, 2016	CD single; DVD	Dimension Point	

== See also ==
- Music of Death Note: Light Up the New World
