= Hero (Namie Amuro song) =

- CD and DVD cover artwork.

Single by Namie Amuro

from the album Finally
- B-side: "Show Me What You've Got"
- Released: July 27, 2016
- Recorded: 2016
- Genre: Pop
- Length: 5:37
- Label: Avex Trax; Dimension Point
- Songwriter: Ryosuke Imai
- Producer: Sunny Boy

Namie Amuro singles chronology
"Mint" (2016)	"Hero" (2016)	"Dear Diary" / "Fighter" (2016)

Music video
- "Hero"(Music Video) on YouTube "Hero"(NHK Official Music Video) on YouTube "Hero"(Lyric Video) on YouTube "Show Me What You've Got" on YouTube

"Hero" is a song by Japanese recording artist Namie Amuro. It was released as a stand-alone single on July 27, 2016 by Avex Trax and Amuro’s own label Dimension Point; it was distributed physically in Japan and Taiwan, and digitally worldwide. The song was written by Ryosuke Imai and Sunny Boy, whilst production and composing was handled by the latter collaborator. Originally slated to appear as a B-side track to her previous single "Mint", it served as the official Japanese theme song to the 2016 Summer Olympics and Paralympics, broadcast by the NHK. Alongside this, a B-side track titled "Show Me What You’ve Got" appeared on the release of "Hero".

Musically, "Hero" is a pop song that incorporates elements of dance music. It is an empowerment anthem, while the lyrical content focuses on themes such as courage, triumph, and faith; the title of the track is a reference to the competitors at the 2016 Summer Olympics. Upon its release, "Hero" received positive reviews from music critics, who commended the lyrical content and production of the track. Critics also praised its empowerment and its inclusion as a theme song for the Olympics.

Commercially, the single was successful in Japan, peaking at number six on the Oricon Singles Chart, one of her few singles to miss the top five. It performed better on Japan's Billboard charts, peaking at number one on Japan Hot 100 and has since spent 59 weeks on the chart. The single was also successful digitally, receiving a triple Platinum certification in April 2018. Six music videos directed by YKBX were produced for the song that visually represent the colours and events of the 2016 Olympics. To promote the single, Amuro performed "Hero" on her 2016–17 Live Style concert tour.

== Background and release ==
In March 2016, Japanese music publication Jame World announced the release of Amuro's single "Mint", scheduled on May 18, 2016. Online publications also reported a new song titled "Hero", which was to be included with the physical and digital formats of "Mint", but was later removed for unknown reasons. Then on March 25, an announcement from Japan Today revealed that "Hero" had been chosen as the NHK Broadcasting theme song for the 2016 Summer Olympics and Paralympics in Rio de Janeiro, Brazil, as part of Japan's entry to the event. The NHK committee personally chose Amuro to perform the theme song based on her "powerful voice that can deeply move people’s hearts" and "her popularity among different generations." That same day, Amuro commented that she was "extremely honored" to perform at the Olympics and said it was a "dream happening only once in four years."

"Hero" was first leaked online in mid-April 2016. The single was released on July 27, 2016 through Avex Trax and Amuro's own label Dimension Point as a CD single and DVD Single in Japan and Taiwan, and a digital EP worldwide. It also served as Amuro's sixth non-album maxi single, after the release of her May 2016 single "Mint". Alongside this, the accompanied formats of the single included a B-side track named "Show Me What You've Got". According to Amuro, she described the sound of "Show Me What You've Got" as a "cheerful" and "fun" pop song that features instrumentation of synthesizers and marching drums. On June 20, first press issues at CDJapan.com offered special gold packaging of both the CD and DVD format, alongside a B2-size poster.

== Composition ==
"Hero" was written by Japanese musician Ryosuke Imai, and composed, arranged, and produced by Sunny Boy. The song's instrumentation includes string sections by the Yuichiro Goto Strings assemble, acoustic guitar by Singo Kubota, and synthesizers and keyboards by Imai and Sunny Boy. The chorus features a choir chanting by: Chiaki Ishii, Kou Kuroda, Minato Kuroda, Momoka Kimura, Imai, Sunny Boy, Yume Iwata, and Yuto Newberry, and was recorded at Avex Studios in Tokyo, Japan by Fumitoshi Nakamura and Wataru Namifusa; Japanese recording artist Emyli provides backing vocals throughout the entire track. Musically, "Hero" was described by Amuro as a pop song that incorporates musical elements of dance music. Lyrically, the song focuses on themes such as courage and triumph, whist referencing factors of Olympians. The NHK committee agreed, labelling the overall song as an "inspirational tune" that serves as a "human anthem to cheer the athletes." The committee further stated that the lyrical content hopefully intertwines with the athletes competing and the audience, stating "Athletes face this grand stage once every 4 years. Together with this dynamic music, we expect to boost people's expressions, and raise everyone's excitement."

== Reception ==
"Hero" received positive reviews from music critics. A staff member at CD Journal was positive in their review, labelling the track "elegan[t]" and full of "passion". Similarly, staff editors at SBS PopAsia Australia commended the track by saying that it's a "driving tune that will get everyone excited and on their feet." Commercially, "Hero" was a moderate success in Japan. It debuted at number six on the Oricon Singles Chart, selling 28,879 units; it became her second non-album single after "Brighter Day" to miss the top five. By the end of July 2016, it was ranked at number 20 with the same unit sales from its first week. The following week, it fell to number 19 with 5,230 unit sold, one of Amuro's largest drops on the chart. However, in the wake of the 2016 Summer Olympics, it rose to number 15 and sold 6,163 units.

The single fared better through digital outlets in Japan, peaking at the top spot on the Recochoku Ringtone Charts and Japan's iTunes Store chart. It debuted at number 44, number 48, and number six on the Japan Hot 100 chart, Radio Songs Chart, and Hot Singles Sales chart, all hosted by Billboard. The track entered the top ten in its second week for the first two charts, whilst it slipped to 19 on the latter. In the wake of the 2016 Summer Olympics, the single rose to number three, number two, and number 14 on all three charts respectively. The B-side track "Show Me What You've Got" reached number 95 on the Japan Hot 100 chart for a sole week.

== Music videos ==
The official video, and special Olympic gold video, features Namie Amuro (pictured) walking across a bridge with gold architecture.

Six music videos were produced for the single; the first being a lyric video, which lasts two minutes and 46 seconds. The video includes the artwork of the single, alongside a behind the scenes of the photo shoot for the single cover. Then three more music videos were released on Amuro's YouTube channel, labelled the "Green Floor", the "Blue Floor", and the "Red Floor", all representing the elements of earth, water, and fire. The green floor video opens with Amuro sitting on a field of flowers, underneath a large architecture. Several vines and flowers are then surrounding large parts of the building, whilst Amuro sings the song with back up dancers surrounding her and flower petals falling from the ceiling.

The "Blue Floor" opens with Amuro sitting on a white ledge, surrounded by back up dancers again and underneath the large architecture. The floor is covered with water, and features large floating water bubbles. Some scenes during the video features Amuro singing the song and standing in the water. The red floor opens with Amuro on a large brick platform, and features a large statue holding fire. The back up dancers start to run up to Amuro, whilst she is setting a large object ablaze. It closes with confetti falling from the sky, along with Amuro walking around on the platform. In a special commentary by Amuro, she stated that each of the three videos symbolises a special trait: the green floor represents "Love", the blue floor represents "Life", and the red floor represents "Passion".

Then on July 5, Amuro announced a fifth music video entitled the "Gold Edition". This version featured her walking through a large cityscape with intricate architecture that were made out of gold. According to Amuro, she stated that this video is a "special Olympic version depicting the road to glory in a world of gold." The full version had broadcast on NHK's website that same day, and also featured a special commentary by Amuro. Then on July 22, a shortened edit of the DVD version of "Hero" was uploaded on Amuro's YouTube account. The video is a collective of all the single's previous videos, except the lyric video, with additional new scenes of the architecture and of Amuro singing the track in different locations, and each of the colors represent the flag of Brazil, the country where "Hero" will be broadcast. The music video received positive reviews from online publications, including a staff member at SBS PopAsia Australia, labelling the video "surreal" and "colorful".

The music video to the B-side track "Show Me What You've Got" was released on Amuro's YouTube channel on July 21, which featured Amuro and a group of friends enjoying a party on a double-decker bus. The bus was not moving throughout the video shoot, which required two large video screens to be placed outside the bus to show motion shots of driving, whilst the set was decorated with balloons, food, and furniture.

== Promotion and live performances ==
"Hero" was used as the official Japanese theme song for the 2016 Summer Olympics and 2016 Summer Paralympics held in Rio de Janeiro, broadcast by NHK. The single was included on the setlist for Amuro's 2016-2017 Live Style concert tour, which began at the Kanagawa-ku, Yokohama national hall stadium.

== Track listing ==
- Digital download
1. "Hero" – 5:37
- CD single
1. "Hero" – 5:37
2. "Show Me What You've Got" - 3.05
3. "Hero" (Instrumental) – 5:37
4. "Show Me What You've Got" (Instrumental) - 3.05
- DVD single
1. "Hero" – 5:37
2. "Show Me What You've Got"
3. "Hero" (Instrumental) – 5:37
4. "Show Me What You've Got" (Instrumental) - 3.05
5. "Hero" (music video)
6. "Show Me What You've Got" (music video)

== Personnel ==
Credits adapted from the CD liner notes of "Hero";

Recording

- Recorded at Avex Studios, Tokyo, Japan by Fumitoshi Nakamura and Wataru Namifusa.

Credits

- Namie Amuro – vocals, background vocals
- Ryosuke Imai – songwriting, composition, arrangement
- Yuichiro Goto – arrangement
- Chiaki Ishii – chorus vocals
- Kou Kuroda – chorus vocals
- Minato Kuroda – chorus vocals
- Momoka Kimura – chorus vocals
- Sunny Boy – chorus vocals, production, composition, arrangement
- Yume Iwata – chorus vocals
- Yuto Newberry – chorus vocals
- Singo Kubota – guitar
- Yuichiro Goto Strings – string arrangements
- YKBX – art direction, music video director
- Masaya Asai – design
- Emyli – backing vocals, vocal direction
- Yasuji Maeda – mastering
- D.O.I. – mixing
- Yasunari Kikuma – artwork photography
- Hiromitsu Uehara – music video cinematographer
- Ryouhei Shingu – music video director
- Hirohisa Ishihara – music video producer

== Charts ==
=== Weekly charts ===
Chart (2016)	Peak position
Japan Hot 100 (Billboard)	1
Japan Hot Singles Sales Chart (Billboard)	6
Japan Radio Songs Chart (Billboard)	2
Japan Weekly Chart (Oricon)	5
Japan Weekly Chart (Oricon)	6

=== Monthly charts ===
Chart (2016)	Peak position
Japan Weekly Chart (Oricon)	20
JpopAsia Music Video Chart	1

=== Year-end charts ===
Chart (2016)	Peak position
Japan Hot 100 (Billboard)	29

== Certifications ==
Region	Certification	Certified units/sales
Japan (RIAJ) Digital	3× Platinum	750,000^{*}
Japan (RIAJ) Physical	Gold	100,000^{^}
^{*} Sales figures based on certification alone.^{^} Shipments figures based on certification alone.

== Release history ==
Region	Date	Format	Label
Japan	July 27, 2016	CD single	Avex Trax; Dimension Point
Taiwan	July 27, 2016	CD single	Avex Trax; Dimension Point
Japan	July 27, 2016	CD and DVD	Avex Trax; Dimension Point
Taiwan	July 27, 2016	CD and DVD	Avex Trax; Dimension Point
Japan	July 27, 2016	Digital download	Avex Trax; Avex Entertainment Inc.
Australia	July 27, 2016	Digital download	Avex Music Creative Inc.
New Zealand	July 27, 2016	Digital download	Avex Music Creative Inc.
United Kingdom	July 27, 2016	Digital download	Avex Music Creative Inc.
Ireland	July 27, 2016	Digital download	Avex Music Creative Inc.
Germany	July 27, 2016	Digital download	Avex Music Creative Inc.
Spain	July 27, 2016	Digital download	Avex Music Creative Inc.
France	July 27, 2016	Digital download	Avex Music Creative Inc.
Italy	July 27, 2016	Digital download	Avex Music Creative Inc.
Taiwan	July 27, 2016	Digital download	Avex Music Creative Inc.
United States	July 27, 2016	Digital download	Avex Music Creative Inc.
Canada	July 27, 2016	Digital download	Avex Music Creative Inc.
