= Birthday (Namie Amuro song) =

Promotional single by Namie Amuro

from the album Genic
- Recorded: 2015; (Tokyo, Japan)
- Genre: Dance-pop
- Length: 3:08
- Label: Avex Trax; Avex Music Creative Inc.; Dimension Point
- Songwriter: Emyli
- Producer: SeventyEight

"Birthday" is a song recorded by Japanese recording artist Namie Amuro for her twelfth studio and third English album, Genic (2015). It was written by Emyli, composed by Andreas Carlsson, Gabrielle Symons, Michael Lerios, Demitri Lerios, Svante Halldin and Jakob Hazell, whilst production was handled by Halldin and Hazell. The promotional recording premiered on May 11, 2015, and served as the first promotional single from the album. Musically, "Birthday" is dance-pop song, influenced by pop and bubblegum pop. Lyrically, it celebrates Amuro's birthday.

Upon its release, the track garnered generally favourable reviews from music critics. Many critics commended the composition and production of the track, but some criticized the lyrical content. The song peaked at number 36 on Billboard's Japan Hot 100, and reached number five on the Radio Songs competent chart. An accompanying music video was shot by Haruka Furuya; it features Amuro celebrating her birthday, and dancing in several colorful backgrounds and sceneries. "Birthday" has been performed on Amuro's concert tour named Livegenic 2015–2016.

== Background and composition ==
"Birthday" was written by Japanese recording artist Emyli, whilst production was handled by SeventyEight production member's Svante Halldin and Jakob Hazell. The song's composers: Andreas Carlsson, Gabrielle Symons, Michael Lerios, Demitri Lerios, and SeventyEight, composed the track by using a drum machine, electric guitar, synthesizers, keyboards, and a trombone. It was programmed and mixed by DJ Kensei, known by the alias D.O.I., at his recording studio Daimonion Recordings. Emyli was in control of vocal production, and hired Alisa, Gary Adkins, and Olivia Burrell to provide backing vocals during the chorus. It was finally mastered by American music engineer Tom Coyne at Sterling Sound Studios in New York City, New York. The promotional recording premiered through the Genic (2015) album sampled, released in April 2015. It was then released on Amuro's YouTube channel on May 11, alongside its accompanying music video.

Musically, "Birthday" is dance-pop song, influenced by pop and bubblegum pop. During the song's verses, it includes rap deliveries by Amuro. CD Journal staff member's labelled the delivery as "hilarious", whilst calling it a "girly pop song". Lauren du Plessis from Electric Bloom magazine compared the composition to American recording artist Katy Perry, and called the production "fluffy". Similarly, Michael McCarthy, writing for Otakudx.com, compared the song to the same title tracks by Perry and American recording artist Selena Gomez, and likened the "feel good" lyrical content to "Celebration". A music editor from KpopBreak.com compared "Birthday"'s introduction to "Into the Groove" by American recording artist Madonna. Lyrically, the song celebrates Amuro's birthday and, according to McCarthy, highlights other anniversaries including weddings and parties.

== Critical response ==
"Birthday" received positive reviews from most music critics. Michael McCarthy, writing for Otakudx.com, was positive in his review, saying "Like most of the album, this song is pure fun. Maybe it's slightly bubble gum but it's delicious and instead of losing its flavor it's making me fall more and more in love with it with each listening." A staff member from Japako Music was positive in their review, labelling it a "good song and very catchy". CD Journal staff member's was positive in their review, stating that whilst the song sounded "fresh", it still retained Amuro's signature "charm". Japanese music editor Random J reviewed the song on his blogsite, and labelled it a "playful pop" song. An editor writing for Arama Japan was positive in their review, calling it a "sugary celebratory pop song". However, a staff editor from KpopBreaks.com awarded the song six points out of 10, and was fairly favorable. Whilst the reviewer complimented the musical composition and its musical similarities between Madonna and Katy Perry, he felt the lyrical content was incomprehensible; "Also, I don’t know why she’s going on about her 'double-birthday' (is she actually 74 years old?)."

== Commercial performance ==
"Birthday" was the only charting track from the Genic album, debuting at number 36 on Billboard's Japan Hot 100 chart. The song slipped to number 51 on its second week, dated on June 29. It had its final charting appearance during the week of July 6, stalling at number 70 with a total of three weeks in that chart. "Birthday" also charted on Billboard's Japan Radio Songs Chart, debuting at number 68. The following week, dated June 22, the song rose to its peak position of number five. It slipped to number 11 the following week, dated June 29. It had its final charting appearance during the week of July 13, stalling at number 90 with a total of 5 weeks in that chart.

== Music video ==
The music video was directed by Japanese music video director Haruka Furuya. Amuro's record labels: Dimension Point and Avex Trax, hired several dancers and extra actors to perform in the music video. The dancers and actors were told by Dimension Point's and Avex Trax's management that the entire video would be shot in one entire take, prompting several pre-rehearsals before the music video commences. During the rehearsals, the dancers had made mistakes and some claimed that the choreography was too "difficult" to shoot in one entire take; his made Furuya postpone the entire direction of the final music video. Amuro found the dressing room scene to be difficult, as she had to rehearse dress-changes within a specific time frame so Furuya could be directed correctly. The music video was completed during one take by Furuya, and no additional computer generated imagery or further video editing was included in the final cut.

The video starts with a pink telephone ringing, where Amuro answers it. The scene pans out, and has Amuro exit her home (which is near a flower bouquet stand) with her friends surprising her on her birthday. After taking selfies, Amuro and two female back-up dancers dance to the remaining part of the chorus. Amuro runs to a dressing room and picks out a pink mini-dress. Four back-up dancers than look at several other outfits on clothes rackings, and dance to the song. Amuro walks out of the dressing room in the pink mini-dress, and receives an invitation to her birthday. Two small children (one boy and one girl) walk Amuro into a small room, whilst two back-up dancers hold curtains. The curtains are pulled, and Amuro is seen behind them with balloons. The dancers and extra actors celebrate Amuro's birthday with balloons and confetti as she sings the song. Amuro and the back-up dancers perform during the last chorus, with the camera zooming out; the final scene has everyone putting their hands up, as the locations Amuro visited are circulated around a circle stage.

A second music video was shot on a cellphone, which included unreleased scenes from the music video. The cellphone is seen throughout parts of the first music video, and is past along to different back-up dancers and extra actors in the first video. Both versions were included on the DVD and Blu-Ray versions of Genic; the first video appeared as the second video track, whilst the second video was a hidden music video track. The music video received positive reviews from critics. Japanese music editor Random J called Amuro in the video "too damn cute", and praised the production. The music video for "Birthday" was nominated for the MTV Japan Music Video Award for Best Female Video, whilst Amuro was independently nominated for Best Creativity Award on October 15, 2015; this was Amuro's first nominations in six years. During the ceremony, Amuro won both awards respectively.

== Live performance ==
"Birthday" was included on Amuro's concert tour, named Livegenic 2015–2016; the album was in support of the Genic album. "Birthday" was performed as one of the encore tracks to the concert tour, was released on the live DVD and Blu-Ray, entitled Namie Amuro Livegenic 2015–2016 (2016).

== Personnel ==
Personnel details were sourced from Genic's liner notes booklet.

Musicians

- Gary Adkins – chorus vocals
- Alisa – chorus vocals
- Namie Amuro – main vocals
- Olivia Burrell – chorus vocals
- Emyli – chorus vocals

Personnel

- Dimension Point – sound production, A&R
- D.O.I. – mixing
- Svante Halldin – producer
- Jakob Hazell – producer
- Wataru Namiusa – vocal recording

Music video personnel

- Yuki Akagi – cast hair and make-up
- Ayano – dancer
- Satomi Fujieda – production designers
- Haruka Furuya – director
- Hiroyuki – dancer
- Norio Honda – cast stylist, dancer stylist
- Masako Ide – hair and make-up for dancers
- Eriko Ishida – hair and make-up for Namie Amuro
- Izumi – dance producer
- Koji Matsuura – cinematographer
- Miki – dancer
- Nanako – choreographer
- Akira Noda – stylist for Namie Amuro
- Ryoji – dancer
- Risa – dancer
- Shikino – dancer
- Uno – dancer
- Koji Yoshino – lighting direction
- Yuu – dancer

== Charts ==
Chart (2015)	Peak position
Japan Hot 100 (Billboard)	36
