= Just You and I =

Just You and I may refer to:

- "Just You and I" (Namie Amuro song), 2017
- "Just You and I" (Tom Walker song), 2017
- "Just You And I", a song by Doda from Aquaria, 2022
