= Matthew Tishler =

- Born: Toronto, Ontario, Canada
- Genres: Pop; K-pop; J-pop; teen-pop; soundtrack; Musical theater
- Occupations: Record producer; songwriter; musician; music publisher
- Instruments: Vocals; keyboards; piano; bass
- Years active: 2010–present
- Website: laundromatmusic.com

Matthew Tishler is a Canadian songwriter and music producer who has written and produced songs for film, television, radio, stage, and theme parks. He is known for his work with teen pop artists such as Olivia Rodrigo, Sabrina Carpenter, Dove Cameron, Ashley Tisdale, and JoJo Siwa, as well as popular K-pop/J-pop artists like BTS, TWICE, EXO, TVXQ, NCT Dream, ENHYPEN, Taeyeon, Red Velvet, BoA, Namie Amuro, Kumi Koda, EXILE Atsushi, P1Harmony, ZEROBASEONE and Stray Kids . His projects have combined sales of over 25 million units.

Tishler produced and co-wrote the theme song to Girl Meets World, "Take on the World", performed by Sabrina Carpenter and Rowan Blanchard, and songs for many Disney Channel original movies and series, including High School Musical: The Musical: The Series, Descendants, Zombies, Austin & Ally, Teen Beach 2 and Shake It Up. He also co-wrote and produced "She's So Gone" from Lemonade Mouth, which is featured on Billboard's list of "The 100 Greatest Disney Songs of All Time" and Rolling Stone's "Fake Bands, Real Songs: The 50 Best Tunes by Made-Up Musicians".

In early 2016, he was responsible for co-producing and co-writing a wave of successful K-pop singles, including "Sing for You" and "For Life" by EXO, "Rain" by Taeyeon from Girls' Generation, and "Good Luck" by AOA charting combined sales in excess of 1.4 million units that year. Tishler co-wrote and co-produced "보조개 (Dimple)" by BTS, which was featured on Love Yourself: Her and Love Yourself: Answer, the #1 albums in Korea for 2017 and 2018, respectively. Tishler also wrote and produced the title track for Namie Amuro's record-breaking album "Finally" (#1 album in Japan for 2017 and 2018), and its accompanying "Finally" DVD/Blu-ray, which is the best-selling music DVD/Blu-ray in Japan of all time.

He also produced All I Want by Olivia Rodrigo and was a music producer on the finale of Pasek and Paul's movie-musical Lyle, Lyle, Crocodile, performed by Shawn Mendes.

== Selected discography ==
=== Album credits ===
Title	Year	Artist	Album	Label
"I Know U Know"	2025	ZEROBASEONE	Never Say Never	WakeOne
"Make Me Love You"	2025	Taeyeon	Panorama: The Best of Taeyeon	SM Entertainment
"Rain"	2025	Taeyeon	Panorama: The Best of Taeyeon	SM Entertainment
"U R"	2025	Taeyeon	Panorama: The Best of Taeyeon	SM Entertainment
"Air"	2025	SUPER JUNIOR	Super Junior25	SM Entertainment
"Countdown!" (single)	2025	TWS	Try With Us	Pledis Entertainment
"Random Play"	2025	TWS	Try With Us	Pledis Entertainment
"Show The World"	2025	Milo Manheim, Meg Donnelly, Malachi Barton, Freya Skye and Cast	Zombies 4: Dawn of the Vampires	Walt Disney Records
"Just Friends"	2025	Doyoung	Soar	SM Entertainment
"Red Christmas" (single)	2024	Kylie Cantrall	Descendants: The Rise of Red	Walt Disney Records
"Keep Swimmin' Through"	2023	Enhypen	Baby Shark's Big Movie!	Paramount+
"Sugar"	2023	Kep1er	<FLY-HIGH>	WakeOne
"Monsters Are"	2023	Cast of Monster High	Monster High 2	Paramount+
"Light It Up"	2023	Lightsum	Honey Or Spice	Cube Entertainment
"Heart Feels..."	2023	Little Glee Monster	Ima Kono Tokiwo - EP	Sony Music Entertainment Japan
"Puppy Love"	2023	Joshua Bassett	High School Musical: The Musical: The Series	Walt Disney Records
"Can I Have This Dance" (Producer)	2023	Joshua Bassett & Sofia Wylie	High School Musical: The Musical: The Series	Walt Disney Records
"Call It What You Want"	2023	Julia Lester & Saylor Bell	High School Musical: The Musical: The Series	Walt Disney Records
"Love You Forever"	2023	Cast of High School Musical: The Musical: The Series	High School Musical: The Musical: The Series	Walt Disney Records
"Wonder Lover"	2023	Little Glee Monster	Fanfare - EP	Sony Music Entertainment Japan
"Hello New Day"	2023	Little Glee Monster	Fanfare - EP	Sony Music Entertainment Japan
"Cloud Nine"	2023	Cherry Bullet	Cherry Dash	FNC Entertainment
"Imagine More"	2022	Morissette	Imagine More - Single	Walt Disney Records
"It's A Snow Day"	2022	Cast of Snow Day	Snow Day	Paramount+
"These Kids"	2022	Jerry Trainor	Snow Day	Paramount+
"BFF"	2022	P1Harmony	Harmony: Set In - EP	FNC Entertainment
"Take A Look At Us Now (Finale)" (Producer)	2022	Shawn Mendes	Lyle, Lyle, Crocodile	Sony
"Three Of Us"	2022	Cast of Monster High	Monster High: The Movie	Paramount+
"Rising"	2022	Julia Lester	High School Musical: The Musical: The Series	Walt Disney Records
"Sorry, Heart"	2022	NCT Dream	Beatbox	SM Entertainment
"Dimple"	2022	BTS	Proof	Big Hit Music
"Unthinkable"	2021	F.T. Island	Lock Up - EP	FNC Entertainment
"Feeling The Love"	2021	Dove Cameron, Sofia Carson, China Anne McClain, Cheyenne Jackson	Descendants: The Royal Wedding	Walt Disney Records
"Dance Through The Day"	2021	JoJo Siwa	The J Team	Paramount+
"One Chance"	2021	JoJo Siwa	The J Team	Paramount+
"Only Getting Better - J Team Edition"	2021	JoJo Siwa	The J Team	Paramount+
"Outta The Park"	2021	JoJo Siwa	The J Team	Paramount+
"U-N-I"	2021	JoJo Siwa	The J Team	Paramount+
"Back To That Girl"	2021	JoJo Siwa	The J Team	Paramount+
"Nobody Can Change Me!"	2021	JoJo Siwa	The J Team	Paramount+
"D.R.E.A.M. - J Team Edition" (Producer)	2021	JoJo Siwa	The J Team	Paramount+
"The Rose Song" (Producer)	2021	Olivia Rodrigo	High School Musical: The Musical: The Series: The Soundtrack: Season 2	Walt Disney Records
"The Climb" (Producer)	2021	Joe Serafini	High School Musical: The Musical: The Series: The Soundtrack: Season 2	Walt Disney Records
"Something In The Air"	2020	Olivia Rodrigo, Joshua Basset, Matt Cornett, Sofia Wylie, Larry Saperstein, Julia Lester, Dara Reneé, Frankie Rodriguez & Joe Serafini	High School Musical: The Musical: The Series	Walt Disney Records
"Bad Idea"	2020	Moonbin & Sanha (Astro)	IN-OUT	Fantagio
"amp"	2020	Da-iCE	amp - Single	Avex Trax
"Goodbye"	2020	The Boyz	Reveal	Cre.ker Entertainment
"All I Want" (Producer)	2019	Olivia Rodrigo	High School Musical: The Musical: The Series	Walt Disney Records
"Sweater"	2019	Ailee	Sweater - Single	Sun and Sky Records
"Manipulate"	2019	TVXQ	XV	Avex Trax
"Stop"	2019	Stray Kids	Clé: Levanter	JYP Entertainment
"New Age"	2019	Faky	NEW AGE (single)	Avex Trax
"One Kiss"	2019	Sofia Carson Featuring Dove Cameron and China Anne McClain	Descendants 3	Walt Disney Records
"Team Kaylie (Theme Song)"	2019	Bryana Salaz	Team Kaylie	Netflix
"Here I Am"	2019	Taeyeon	Purpose	S.M. Entertainment
"Road Not Taken"	2019	Stray Kids	Clé 2: Yellow Wood	JYP Entertainment
"Stuck In My Head"	2019	Twice	Fancy You	JYP Entertainment
"Voice"	2019	Taeyeon	Voice	S.M. Entertainment
"It's Time To Celebrate"	2019	JoJo Siwa	Celebrate - EP	Viacom International
"#1U"	2019	JoJo Siwa	Celebrate - EP	Viacom International
"Worldwide Party"	2019	JoJo Siwa	Celebrate - EP	Viacom International
"BOP!"	2019	JoJo Siwa	Celebrate - EP	Viacom International
"Violet"	2019	Cherry Bullet	Let's Play Cherry Bullet	FNC Entertainment
"Trigger"	2018	Tohoshinki	Tomorrow	Avex Entertainment
"Sun & Rain"	2018	TVXQ	New Chapter #1: The Chance of Love	S.M. Entertainment
"보조개" (Dimple)	2018	BTS	Love Yourself: Answer	Big Hit
"Only Getting Better"	2018	JoJo Siwa	Only Getting Better - Single	Viacom International
"Every Girl's A Super Girl"	2018	JoJo Siwa	Every Girl's A Super Girl - Single	Viacom International
"High Top Shoes"	2018	JoJo Siwa	High Top Shoes - Single	Viacom International
"What It's Like To Be Me"	2018	Cozi Zuehlsdorff	Freaky Friday	Walt Disney Records
"Stand"	2018	Meg Donnelly	Zombies	Walt Disney Records
"Finally"	2017	Namie Amuro	Finally	Avex Trax/Dimension Point
"Candy Cane"	2017	Taeyeon	This Christmas – Winter is Coming	S.M. Entertainment
"이카루스" (Rise)	2017	Taemin	Move	S.M. Entertainment
"보조개" (Dimple)	2017	BTS	Love Yourself: Her	Big Hit
"Make Me Love You"	2017	Taeyeon	My Voice	S.M. Entertainment
"Don't Say No"	2017	Seohyun	Don't Say No	S.M. Entertainment
"A Whole New World" (Producer)	2017	lol	Thank You Disney!	Rhythm Zone/Avex
"A Dream Is a Wish Your Heart Makes" (Producer)	2017	Yuki Kashiwagi	Thank You Disney!	Rhythm Zone/Avex
"We're All In This Together" (Producer)	2017	SKE48	Thank You Disney!	Rhythm Zone/Avex
"So Close" (Producer)	2017	Kumi Koda	Thank You Disney!	Rhythm Zone/Avex
"There For You"	2017	Jade Alleyne & Jayden Revri	The Lodge: Season 2 Soundtrack (Music from the TV Series)	Walt Disney Records
"Figure It Out"	2017	Bethan Wright	The Lodge: Season 2 Soundtrack (Music from the TV Series)	Walt Disney Records
"Watch Me"	2017	Jade Alleyne	The Lodge: Season 2 Soundtrack (Music from the TV Series)	Walt Disney Records
"Over Til It's Over"	2017	Cast of The Lodge	The Lodge: Season 2 Soundtrack (Music from the TV Series)	Walt Disney Records
"Step Up"	2017	Luke Newton, Thomas Doherty, Jayden Revri	The Lodge: Season 2 Soundtrack (Music from the TV Series)	Walt Disney Records
"Step Up - Jess Version"	2017	Dove Cameron	The Lodge: Season 2 Soundtrack (Music from the TV Series)	Walt Disney Records
"Never Enough"	2017	Kumi Koda	Never Enough - Single	Rhythm Zone/Avex
"Kid In A Candy Store"	2017	JoJo Siwa	Kid In A Candy Store - Single	Viacom International
Bizaardvark (Theme Song)	2016	Olivia Rodrigo and Madison Hu	Bizaardvark	Walt Disney Records
"Alive"	2019	J-Min	Alive - Single	S.M. Entertainment
For Life"	2016	EXO	For Life	S.M. Entertainment
"If You Love Her"	2016	SHINee	1 of 1 – Repackage	S.M. Entertainment
"Dear Diary"	2016	Namie Amuro	Dear Diary	Avex Trax/Dimension Point
"The Great Divide"	2016	Rebecca Black	The Great Divide	Rebecca Black
"Believe That"	2016	Cast of The Lodge	The Lodge	Walt Disney Records
"If You Only Knew"	2016	Jade Alleyne	The Lodge	Walt Disney Records
"Tell It Like It Is"	2016	Dominic Harrison	The Lodge	Walt Disney Records
"What I've Been Wishin' For"	2016	Sophie Simnett, Jade Alleyne, Luke Newton, Thomas Doherty, Bethan Wright, Jayden Revri, Dominic Harrison	The Lodge	Walt Disney Records
"Good Luck"	2016	AOA	Good Luck	FNC Entertainment
"Call You Bae"	2016	Ji-Min and Xiumin	Call You Bae - Single	FNC Entertainment and S.M. Entertainment
"Soldier"	2016	Taemin	Press It	S.M. Entertainment
"Because of You"	2016	Yoon Mi-rae	S.M. Station	S.M. Entertainment
"Rain"	2016	Taeyeon	Rain	S.M. Entertainment
"No Me Without You"	2016	Kumi Koda	Winter of Love	Rhythm Zone/Avex
"Two in Million"	2016	Ross Lynch and Laura Marano	Austin & Ally	Walt Disney Records
"That Good Good"	2015	Lu Han	Reloaded	LuHan Studio
"Your Song"	2015	Lu Han	Reloaded	LuHan Studio
"Football Gang"	2015	Lu Han	Reloaded	LuHan Studio
"Deep"	2015	Lu Han	Reloaded	LuHan Studio
"Wish Tree"	2015	Red Velvet	Winter Garden (Single)	S.M. Entertainment
"Sing For You"	2015	Exo	Sing For You (Single)	S.M. Entertainment
"Red Carpet"	2015	Namie Amuro	Red Carpet (Single)	Rhythm Zone/Avex
"U R"	2015	Taeyeon	I	S.M. Entertainment
"Best Summer Ever"	2015	Ross Lynch/Maia Mitchell/Garrett Clayton/Grace Phipps/John DeLuca/Jordan Fisher/Chrissie Fit	Teen Beach 2	Walt Disney Records
"It's Our World"	2015	Jacquie Lee	Monkey Kingdom	Walt Disney Records
"Your Love's Like"	2015	Sabrina Carpenter	Eyes Wide Open	Hollywood Records
"Gimme U"	2015	Kumi Koda	Walk of My Life	Rhythm Zone/Avex
"Dance Like Nobody's Watching"	2015	Laura Marano	Austin & Ally: Take It from the Top	Walt Disney Records
"Chandelier"	2014	Tohoshinki	With	Avex Trax
"Take on the World"	2014	Sabrina Carpenter/Rowan Blanchard	Girl Meets World	Walt Disney Records
Grotesque	2014	Namie Amuro/Ken Hirai	Grotesque – Single	DefStar Records
"Superhero"	2013	Ross Lynch	Austin & Ally: Turn It Up	Walt Disney Records
"Finally Me"	2013	Laura Marano	Austin & Ally: Turn It Up	Walt Disney Records
"Can't Leave"	2013	Shinee	Chapter 2. Why So Serious? – The Misconceptions of Me	S.M. Entertainment
"Christmas Soul"	2012	Ross Lynch	Disney Channel Holiday Playlist	Walt Disney Records
"I Got My Scream On"	2012	China Anne McClain	Make Your Mark: Ultimate Playlist	Walt Disney Records
"Butterfly"	2012	Jessica & Krystal	To the Beautiful You	S.M. Entertainment
"Let's Get Crazy"	2012	Gogol Bordello	Coca-Cola UEFA Euro Cup 2012 Anthem	Coca-Cola
"All About Tonight" (Producer)	2012	Cymphonique	How To Rock	Nickelodeon
"Lay Down"	2012	Kumi Koda	Japonesque	Rhythm Zone/Avex
"Love Me Back"	2012	Kumi Koda	Japonesque	Rhythm Zone/Avex
"Break Down The Walls"	2012	Ross Lynch	Austin & Ally Soundtrack	Walt Disney Records
"Itsuka Kitto..."	2011	EXILE Atsushi	EXILE JAPAN/Solo	Rhythm Zone/Avex
"最後情人"	2011	Joey Yung	Joey & Joey	EEG
"花千樹"	2011	Joey Yung	Joey & Joey	EEG
"She"	2011	TVXQ	Keep Your Head Down	S.M. Entertainment
"She's So Gone"	2011	Naomi Scott	Lemonade Mouth	Walt Disney Records
"The Rest of My Life"	2011	Ashley Tisdale	Sharpay's Fabulous Adventure	Walt Disney Records
"My Boi And Me"	2011	Ashley Tisdale	Sharpay's Fabulous Adventure	Walt Disney Records
"My Girl And Me"	2011	Shawn Molko	Sharpay's Fabulous Adventure	Walt Disney Records
"Don't Know What To Say"	2010	BoA	Hurricane Venus	S.M. Entertainment
"Heartbreak"	2009	Akina Nakamori	Diva	Universal Music Japan

=== Film/television credits ===
- Lemonade Mouth (Disney Channel)
- Sharpay's Fabulous Adventure (Disney Channel)
- Shake It Up (Disney Channel)
- Austin & Ally (Disney Channel)
- A.N.T. Farm (Disney Channel)
- Radio Rebel (Disney Channel)
- Girl vs. Monster (Disney Channel)
- Liv and Maddie (Disney Channel)
- How To Rock (Nickelodeon)
- Hollywood Heights (Nickelodeon) – Theme Song
- The Fresh Beat Band (Nickelodeon)
- To the Beautiful You (SBS)
- Hi wa Mata Noboru (TV Asahi) – Theme Song
- Nazotoki wa Dinner no Ato de (Fuji TV) – Theme Song
- Chase (NBC)
- 12 Dates of Christmas (ABC Family)
- Degrassi: The Next Generation
- Unstable (CMT)
- Pretty Little Liars (ABC Family)
- Snooki & JWoww (MTV)
- People's Choice Awards (CBS)
- E! News (E!)
- Blaze and the Monster Machines (Nickelodeon)
- Dora and Friends: Into the City! (Nickelodeon)
- Girl Meets World (Disney Channel)
- Teen Beach 2 (Disney Channel)
- Corn & Peg (Nickelodeon)
- I Am Frankie (Nickelodeon) – Theme Song
- Butterbean's Café (Nickelodeon)
- Fancy Nancy (Disney Junior)
- Pup Academy (Disney Channel)
- Mira, Royal Detective (Disney Junior)
- Zombies (Disney Channel)
- Descendants 3 (Disney Channel)
- The Adventures of Rocky and Bullwinkle (Amazon Prime) - "Almost Famoose" Theme Song
- Freaky Friday (Disney Channel)
- Team Kaylie (Netflix)
- Barbie: Princess Adventure (Netflix)
- Barbie: Big City, Big Dreams (Netflix)
- Barbie: It Takes Two (Netflix)
- Barbie: Mermaid Power (Netflix)
- Mickey Mornings (Disney Junior)
- High School Musical: The Musical: The Series (Disney+)
- Team Zenko Go (Netflix) - Theme Song
- The J Team (Nickelodeon/Paramount+)
- Monster High: The Movie (Nickelodeon/Paramount+)
- Snow Day (Nickelodeon/Paramount+)
- Lyle, Lyle, Crocodile (Sony)
- CoComelon Lane (Moonbug Entertainment)
- Monster High 2 (Nickelodeon/Paramount+)
- Hailey's On It! (Disney Channel)
- Baby Shark's Big Movie! (Nickelodeon/Paramount+)
- Vampirina: Teenage Vampire (Disney Channel)
- Rise Up, Sing Out (Disney Jr.)
- Sesame Street

=== Miscellaneous credits ===
- Official Coca-Cola UEFA Euro 2012 Anthem (Coca-Cola)
- Disney Parks Christmas Day Parade – "Baby, It's Cold Outside" performed by Jason Derulo and Jordin Sparks
- "Put a Little Love in Your Heart" (Coca-Cola Commercial)
- "Fa La La" (McDonald's Commercial)
- JoJo Siwa's D.R.E.A.M. The Tour (Musical Director)
- Disney's Descendants: The Musical
- Descendants Zombies: Worlds Collide Tour
- "The Untrainable Dragon" (How to Train Your Dragon-themed stage show at Universal Epic Universe
- KPop Demon Hunters (Live Musical Director)

== Awards and nominations ==
=== Annie Awards ===
Year	Nominee / work	Award	Result
2022	"Mira, Royal Detective"	Outstanding Achievement for Music in an Animated Television/Media Production	Nominated
2021	"Mira, Royal Detective"	Outstanding Achievement for Music in an Animated Television/Media Production	Nominated

=== BMI Film & TV Awards ===
Year	Nominee / work	Award	Result
2016	"Girl Meets World"	BMI TV Music Award	Won

=== Children's & Family Emmy Awards ===
Year	Nominee / work	Award	Result
2025	"Red Christmas" from Descendants: The Rise of Red	Outstanding Original Song for a Children's or Young Teen Program	Won
2025	"Grow Your World" from Rise Up, Sing Out	Outstanding Original Song for a Preschool Program	Won
2024	"Keep Swimmin' Through" by ENHYPEN from Baby Shark's Big Movie!	Outstanding Original Song for a Preschool Program	Nominated
2024	"Kiss Your Friend" from Hailey's On It!	Outstanding Original Song for a Children's or Young Teen Program	Nominated
2023	"These Kids" from Snow Day	Outstanding Original Song for a Children's or Young Teen Program	Nominated
2023	"One Big Family" from Mira, Royal Detective	Outstanding Original Song for a Preschool Program	Nominated
2022	"If You Have A Dream" from Fancy Nancy	Outstanding Original Song	Nominated
2022	"The J Team"	Outstanding Music Direction and Composition for a Live Action Program	Nominated

=== Daytime Emmy Awards ===
Year	Nominee / work	Award	Result
2018	"Blaze and the Monster Machines"	Outstanding Music Direction and Composition	Nominated

=== Hollywood Music In Media Awards ===
Year	Nominee / work	Award	Result
2023	"Love You Forever" from High School Musical: The Musical: The Series"	Best Song - Onscreen Performance - TV Show/Limited Series	Nominated
