= Just You and I (Namie Amuro song) =

- Limited edition / digital download cover

Single by Namie Amuro

from the album Finally
- B-side: "Strike a Pose"
- Released: May 31, 2017
- Recorded: 2017
- Length: 3:37
- Label: Avex Trax; Dimension Point
- Songwriters: Emyli; MioFranky; Jenna Donnelly; Kiyohito Komatsu
- Producers: Emyli; MioFranky

Namie Amuro singles chronology
"Dear Diary" / "Fighter" (2016)	"Just You and I" (2017)	"Hope" (2018)

Music video
- "Just You and I" on YouTube

Alternative covers
- Standard edition cover

"Just You and I" is a song recorded by Japanese singer Namie Amuro, taken from her sixth compilation album Finally. It was released on May 31, 2017 by Dimension Point and Avex Trax. The song was served as the theme song to the Japanese television series To Be a Mother.

"Just You and I" peaked at number two on the Billboard Japan Hot 100. It has sold over 34,596 physical copies and 100,000 download copies and been certificated gold by Recording Industry Association of Japan (RIAJ). Also, its B-side track "Strike a Pose" peaked at number 57 on the chart.

== Commercial performance ==
Commercially, "Just You and I" was a moderate success in Japan. It debuted at number two on the Japan Hot 100 and debuted at number six on the Oricon Weekly Singles Chart, selling 23,103 physical copies in its first week. It has been certificated gold by Recording Industry Association of Japan (RIAJ) with 100,000 download copies sold.

== Track listing and formats ==
CD
No.	Title	Writer(s)	Length
1.	"Just You and I"	MioFranky; Emyli; Jenna Donnelly; Kiyohito Komatsu	3:37
2.	"Strike a Pose"	Kenzie; Tiger; Lasse Lindorff; Fridolin Nordsoe Schjoldan	3:22
3.	"Just You and I" (Instrumental)	MioFranky; Emyli; Jenna Donnelly; Kiyohito Komatsu
4.	"Strike a Pose" (Instrumental)	Kenzie; Tiger; Lasse Lindorff; Fridolin Nordsoe Schjoldan

Limited edition bonus DVD
No.	Title	Length
1.	"Just You and I" (Music video)

Digital download
No.	Title	Writer(s)	Length
1.	"Just You and I"	MioFranky; Emyli; Jenna Donnelly; Kiyohito Komatsu	3:37
2.	"Strike a Pose"	Kenzie; Tiger; Lasse Lindorff; Fridolin Nordsoe Schjoldan	3:22

== Charts ==
=== "Just You and I" ===
==== Weekly charts ====
Chart (2017)	Peak position
Japan Hot 100 (Billboard)	2
Japan Physical (Oricon)	6
Taiwan East Asia	1

=== "Strike a Pose" ===
==== Weekly charts ====
Chart (2017)	Peak position
Japan Hot 100 (Billboard)	57

== Sales and certification ==
Region	Certification	Certified units/sales
Japan (RIAJ) Digital	Gold	100,000^{*}
Japan Physical	—	30,438
^{*} Sales figures based on certification alone.

== Release history ==
Region	Date	Format	Label
Japan	May 31, 2017	CD; DVD	Avex Trax; Dimension Point
Japan	May 31, 2017	CD	Avex Trax; Dimension Point
Japan	May 31, 2017	Digital download	Avex Trax; Dimension Point
