= Finally (Namie Amuro album) =

- Digital artwork.

Greatest hits album by Namie Amuro
- Released: November 8, 2017
- Recorded: 2015–2017
- Genre: Pop
- Length: 78:00 (Disc 1); 77:00 (Disc 2); 72:00 (Disc 3)
- Label: Dimension Point

Namie Amuro chronology
Genic (2015)	Finally (2017)

Singles from Finally
- 1. "Red Carpet" Released: December 2, 2015; 2. "Mint" Released: May 18, 2016; 3. "Hero" Released: July 27, 2016; 4. "Dear Diary/Fighter" Released: October 26, 2016; 5. "Just You and I" Released: May 31, 2017

Finally (alternatively referred as ALL TIME BEST ALBUM "Finally") is the seventh greatest hits album by Japanese singer Namie Amuro. It was released in a variety of formats by her label Dimension Point on November 8, 2017, and was later distributed to other markets in Asia. It is the singer's final music release upon announcing her retirement from the entertainment industry in September 2018.

The compilation celebrates the singer's entire musical career, from her 1992 debut with Super Monkey's to her most recent singles released in 2017. The majority of the album's material was reworked and re-recorded, with new songs added. Music critics praised the majority of the songs on Finally for their reworked quality, believing the collection captured the singer's craft over the previous four decades of her career. As a result, Amuro's work on Finally earned numerous nominations and awards.

The album achieved commercial success in Japan, reaching number one on the Oricon Albums Chart and Billboard Japan Hot Albums chart. It was also certified double million by the Recording Industry Association of Japan (RIAJ) for shipping over two million units. Having sold over 2,400,000 copies according to Oricon, it is the best-selling album of the 2010s in Japan.

The album included five singles, all of which were successful in Japan. The album received widespread publicity, owing primarily to Amuro's announcement of the record and retirement, and was featured in both Asian and Western publications. She began her nationwide concert tour, which later expanded to other Asian countries, and then went on to perform in her hometown of Okinawa to commemorate her career. The live release was a commercial success, becoming the best-selling music visual in the country. Amuro retired from the music industry on September 16, 2018, after the album's promotion had concluded.

== Background ==
After the success of her studio album Genic (2015), Amuro embarked on the Livegenic tour from 2015 to 2016. After finishing the album's campaign, she commenced her annual Live Style concert tour, which began the same year and ended in 2017. Between these periods, she released several singles with additional B-sides, beginning with "Red Carpet" in December 2015.

After finishing her Live Style tour, Amuro planned to celebrate her 25th career anniversary with a special live show in her hometown of Okinawa. The original idea was to commemorate her 20th anniversary in 2012, but it was cancelled due to weather warnings. The show premiered on September 16 and 17, and it quickly became one of the most popular events in Japanese music history.

On her 40th birthday (September 20, 2017), Amuro announced her plan to retire from the entertainment industry in 2018. In her announcement, she confirmed her plans to release a "final album" and commemorate it with a concert tour, ending her career as a performer. Initially expected to be a studio album, Amuro confirmed that her final release would be a greatest hits compilation featuring all of her songs from her 1992 debut to her most recent single at the time, "Just You and I" (2017). The working title was "All-Time Best," but it was changed to Finally.

== Content ==
Finally is divided into three discs and includes the majority of Amuro's work from her debut with the Super Monkey's in 1992 to "Just You and I". All songs released before her 2014 single "Tsuki" were reworked with new arrangements and compositions, as well as re-recorded vocals by Amuro, with assistance from Wataru Namifusa and vocal direction by Emyli and Kanata Okajima. In addition to these changes, all singles released after "Tsuki" were included in their original form, with the exception of "Brighter Day," which did not appear on the final track list.

The third disc features several original songs. The first new recording is "Hope," an uplifting dance song with "solid" vocals from Amuro. "In Two" is a dance number with influences from EDM and disco music. Tetsuya Komuro, who previously collaborated with Amuro on her earlier albums, wrote and produced "How Do You Feel Now?". This is their first collaboration since working on Amuro's album Break the Rules in 2000. "Showtime" features hip-hop elements that was compared to Amuro's previous singles. "Do It For Love" is an upbeat dance song that lasts four minutes and 22 seconds. The album ends with the title track, a three-minute, 39-second piano ballad.

== Release ==
Finally was released in a variety of formats on November 8, 2017, by her label Dimension Point, and serves as the singer's final music release before retiring. The album's content was packaged in a large jewelcase. A DVD and Blu-ray edition included a bonus disc with music videos for her singles released between 2016 and 2017, as well as visuals for all original material on the third disc. Each version had its own album cover and was housed in a hard slipcase, with the CD version featuring a gold border and the DVD and Blu-ray versions featuring a silver border.

The DVD versions of the album were later distributed in Hong Kong, Taiwan, and other parts of South East Asia on November 24. Yasunari Kikuma photographed the album, Maseru Yoshikawa designed it, and Toshiyuki Suzuki and Jun Hirota created the logo. The CD artwork depicts Amuro in front of a wall of flowers; the DVD version includes a close-up shot of Amuro; and the Blu-ray version includes a blue chiffon in front of Amuro's face. Dimension Point released Finally on digital and streaming platforms on June 16, 2019—two years after its initial release.

== Singles ==
=== Lead releases ===
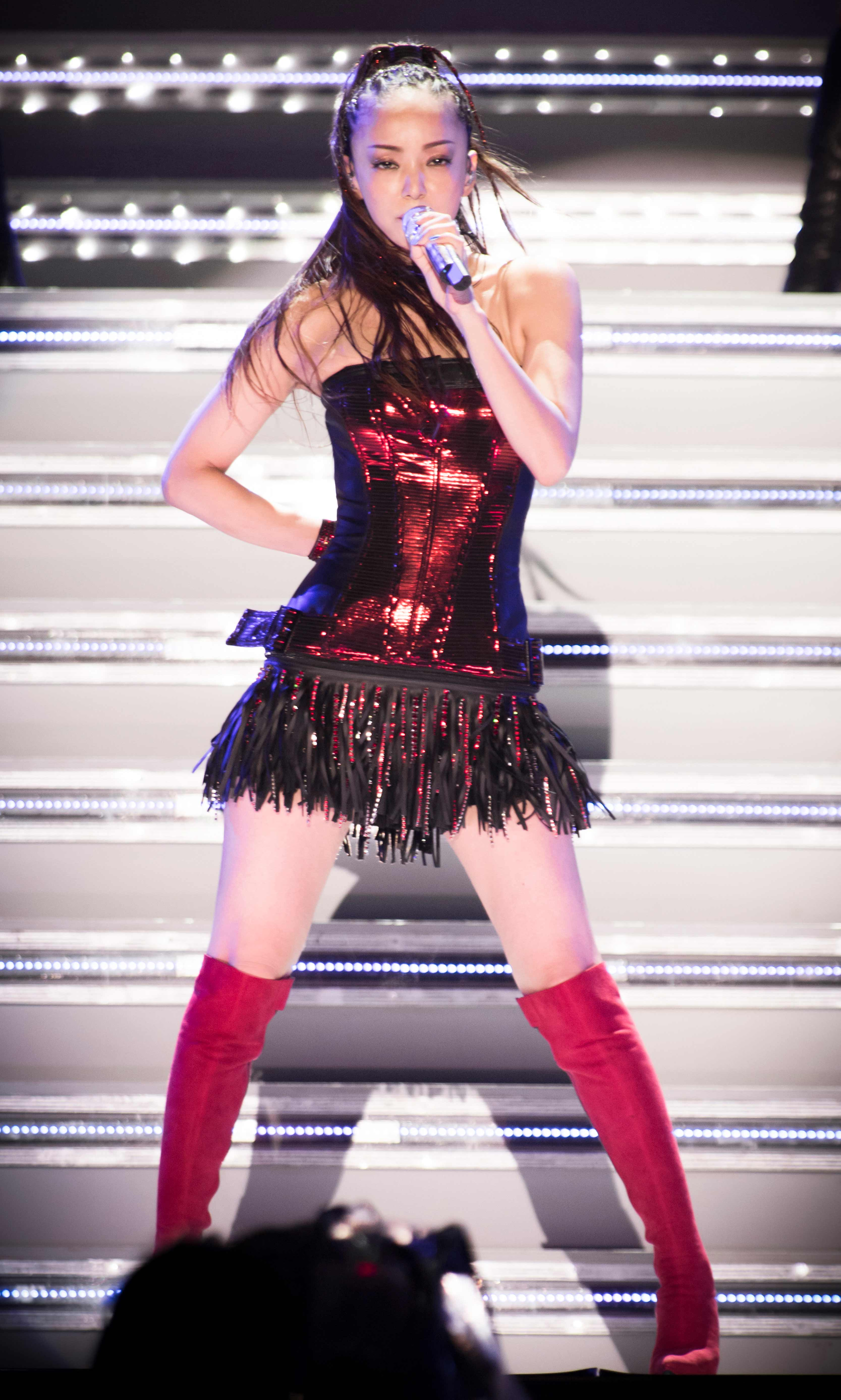
Amuro performing at her 25th Anniversary Live Show in Okinawa, which included several tracks from Finally.

Finally spawned five singles. "Red Carpet" serves as the album's lead single, and it was released as her only single in 2015 on December 2. All formats of the single included the B-side track "Black Make-Up" and its instrumental versions. It received positive feedback for its mature sound and production quality. Commercially, it performed modestly, reaching number two on the Oricon Singles Chart and five on the Japan Hot 100. It sold over 36,000 units in the country and was one of her least successful singles. "Black Make-Up" peaked at number 96 on the Japan Hot 100.

"Mint" was released on May 18, 2016, and was accompanied by the B-side "Chit Chat". It received positive feedback from music critics and attracted international attention for its sound and catchiness. It peaked at number four on the Oricon Singles Chart and two on the Japan Hot 100. It was certified platinum by the Recording Industry Association of Japan (RIAJ) after exceeding 250,000 downloads. "Chit Chat" peaked at number 48 on the Japan Hot 100.

"Hero" was released on July 27, 2016, alongside the B-side "Show Me What You've Got". "Hero" served as the theme song for Japan's entry into the 2016 Summer Olympics and Paralympics, which were broadcast on NHK. The song received positive feedback for its empowering qualities, with many believing it would be suitable for use in the Olympics and Paralympics. It reached number six on the Oricon Singles Chart and three on the Japan Hot 100. Nonetheless, it was a commercial success, with over 750,000 digital units, 100,000 physical copies, and 50 million streams sold according to the RIAJ.

"Dear Diary" and "Fighter" were released as double A-side singles on October 26, 2016. Both songs were used as theme songs for the 2016 live action film Death Note: Light Up the New World, which was inspired by the Japanese anime of the same name. Both songs received positive reviews from music critics and found success in Japan. It peaked at number three on the Oricon Singles Chart; individually, "Dear Diary" peaked at number seven on the Japan Hot 100, while "Fighter" peaked at 15. "Dear Diary" was certified gold by the RIAJ for downloads.

"Just You and I" was released on May 31, 2017. It is the album's final single and Amuro's last before retiring. The single was accompanied by the B-side song "Strike a Pose". "Just You and I" was used as the theme song for the Japanese television drama To Be a Mother. Commercially, it peaked at number six on the Oricon Singles Chart and two on the Japan Hot 100. The RIAJ certified it gold for download sales.

=== Other songs ===
Several songs from Finally were used in commercial campaigns across Japan. "Showtime" served as the theme song for the Tokyo Broadcasting System (TBS) series Kangoku no Ohimesama, which premiered in early October of that year. "Hope" was chosen as the theme song for the 20th anniversary of the anime series One Piece, making it her second recording for the series after "Fight Together" (2011). Toei Animation collaborated with Amuro to produce a special animated live video that aired at the conclusion of the "Episode of Skypiea" TV special on the Japanese version of the show.

The album's title track was used as the theme song for the Japanese television series News Zero. "Do it For Love" was used as a commercial song for Hulu Japan which promoted her monthly documentary series that continued up until her retirement. "How Do You Feel Now?" was used as a promotional track for Docomo and Amuro's 25th anniversary on Tower Records. Furthermore, the new re-recording of her single "Don't Wanna Cry" served as the theme song for the Japanese television series Refreshing. "In Two" was used to promote Avex Trax commercials and products in Japan.

Several songs also appeared on Japanese record charts. On the Oricon Digital Singles Chart, "Showtime" peaked at 47, "Do It For Love" at 43, "How Do You Feel Now?" at 29, a reworked version of "Body Feels Exit" at 32, "Finally" at five, and "Hope" at three. On the Oricon Combined Singles Chart, "Finally" reached number 27. On the Japan Hot 100, "Finally" and "Hope" peaked at 30 and 16, respectively, with the latter receiving RIAJ gold certification for digital sales.

== Promotion and live tours ==
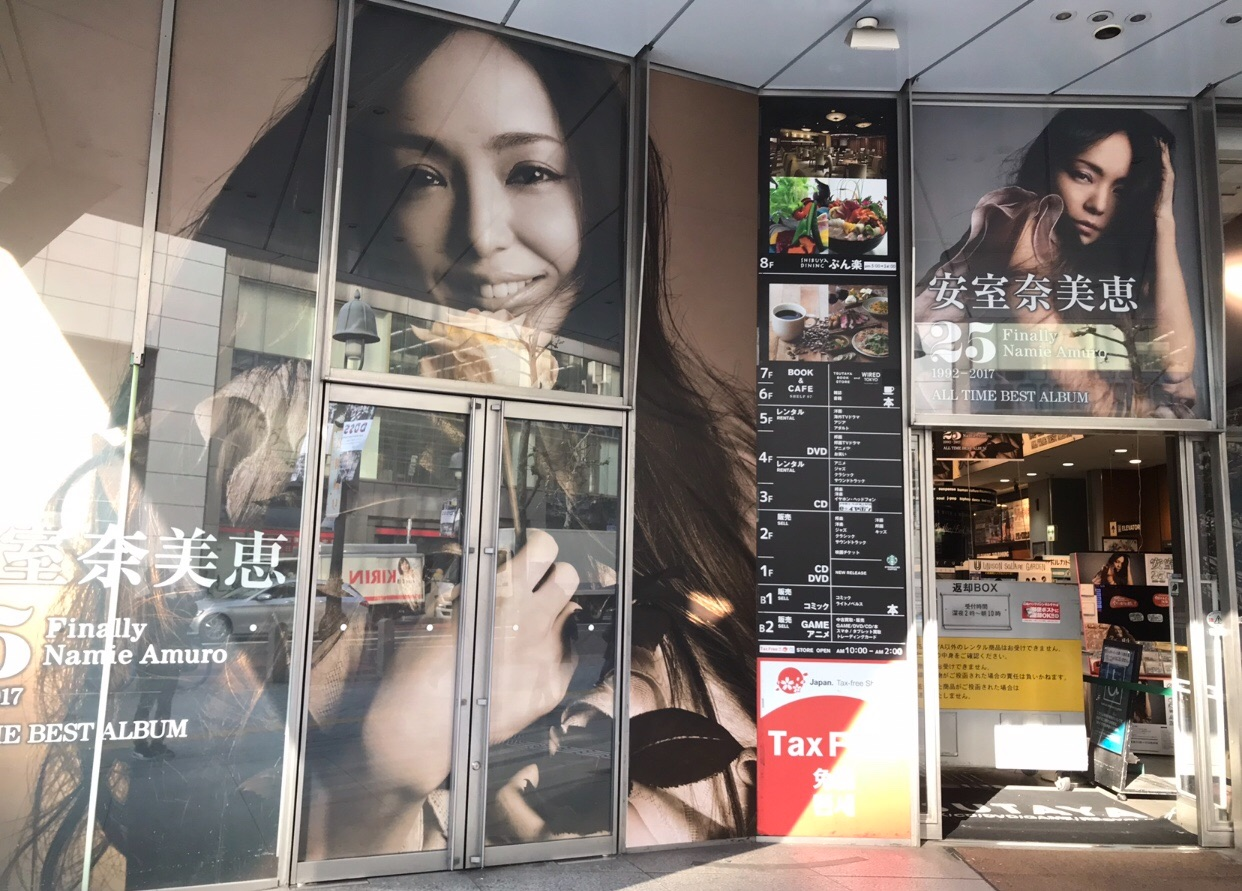
A glass window display promoting Finally at Tower Records in Shibuya.

Finally received extensive promotional support. Following the album's release, Amuro appeared on various television networks, including MTV, Space Shower TV, and Music On! TV. She appeared on four billboards for Docomo, a cellphone network celebrating 25 years with Amuro. She recreated posters from 1995, 2003, 2010, and 2017. Tower Records held a pop-up store in Shibuya from November 7 to the 17th, displaying the album as well as various outfits and previous releases.

Amuro launched her Finally Tour on February 17 and concluded on June 3, 2018. A separate first leg included a special concert in her hometown of Okinawa at Ginowan Seaside Park to celebrate her 25th career anniversary. The show attracted 52,000 people, making it one of the most attended concerts in Japanese music history. The second leg started on February 17 in Nagoya. Amuro visited China and Taiwan in March and May, respectively, and ended the tour on June 3 in Tokyo. The tour drew over 800,000 people, making it the most popular concert tour ever by a Japanese solo artist.

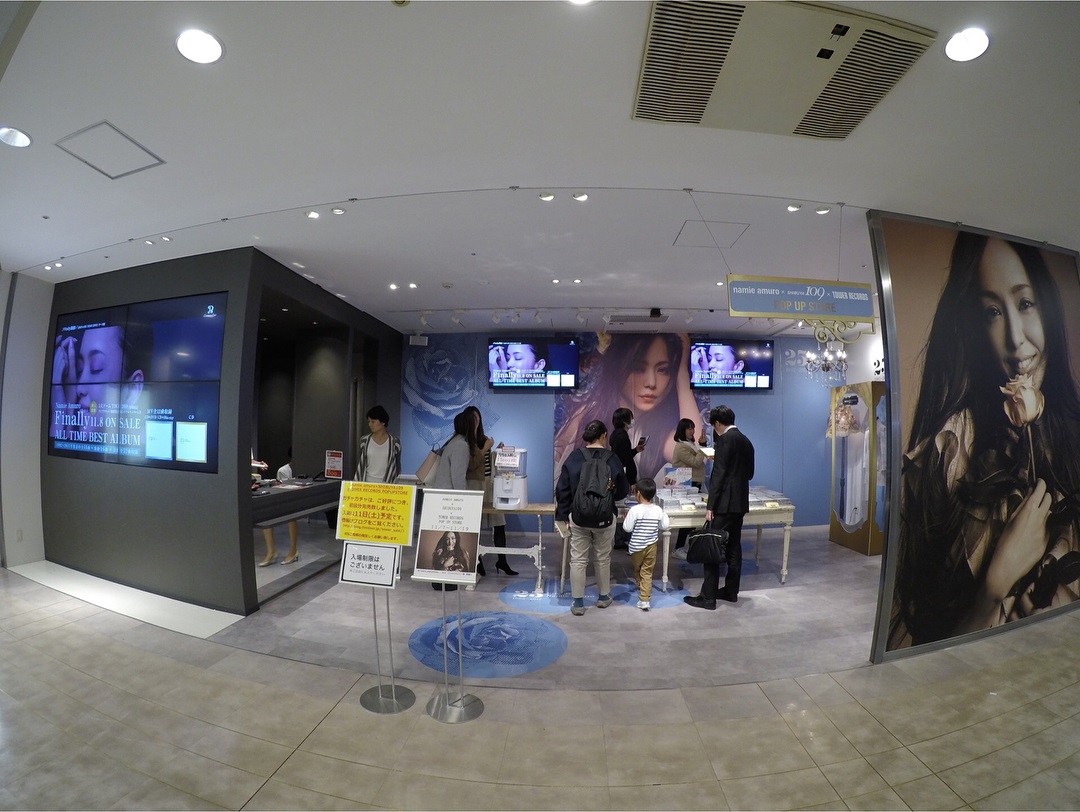
Amuro's pop-up store at Shibuya 109 to promote Finally

The tour was recorded live and released in six Blu-ray and DVD packages, each with unique artwork. Each version included five discs of content: the first two discs contained content from her final performance at the Tokyo Dome, the third disc included live visuals from her 25th anniversary show in Okinawa, and the fourth and fifth discs included a specific video taping of either her concert shows in Nagoya, Fukuoka, Sapporo, Osaka, or Tokyo, all determined by ticketing on the different artworks of each format. The tour's Blu-ray and DVD releases were a commercial success in Japan, topping the Oricon Video Charts. It became the best-selling music video release in Japan, selling more than one million copies.

Following the tour, Amuro announced her final performance, titled "We Love Namie Hanabi Show: I Love Okinawa." I Love Music" show. The show was to honour Amuro's career, her contributions to Japanese music, and other cultural and musical aspects of Okinawa. Additionally, various Okinawan artists attended the show, including Begin, Mongol800, and Ken Hirai; she stated that she was "honoured to stand on the same stage in Okinawa with such wonderful artists," and that she intends to "do her best" to make the festival a memorable celebration of music. The concert took place on September 15 at the Okinawa Convention Center, and she retired from the entertainment industry the next day, on September 16, 2018.

== Critical reception ==
Finally received high praise from music critics. Tomoyuki Mori of Real Sound believed the record captured Amuro's "outstanding vocals and dancing skills" over the course of 25 years, as well as her "dignified attitude" on the album, which he attributed to her "enthusiastic support" over the years. Hitoshi Sugiyama wrote for the same publication, praising the album's genre diversity and Amuro's "maturity" over three discs. Sugiyama selected "Dr." as the best re-recorded song and "How Do You Feel Now?" as their favourite new recording. CDJournal described Amuro's new vocal work on the album as "cute" and "glossy". You Onoda of Mikiki (Tower Records) praised Amuro's singing, emphasising her vulnerability and emotion in most tracks.

== Commercial performance ==
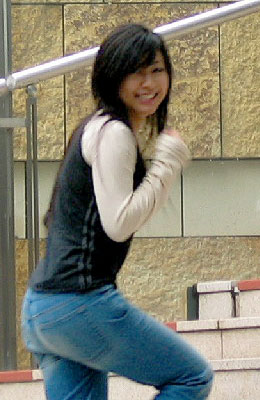
Finally became the first album to sell over one million units by a Japanese act in its first week since 2004, having previously been set by Utada Hikaru Single Collection Vol. 1 by Hikaru Utada (pictured).

Finally was a huge success in Japan. Pre-orders were placed in advance, and the album's promotional campaign helped it exceed sales expectations. Avex Group confirmed that by the album's release date, it had shipped one million retail units, making Amuro the only artist to exceed that amount over four decades, following Sweet 19 Blues (age 19), 181920 (age 20), Best Fiction (age 30), and Finally (age 40 at the time). SoundScan Japan (now Luminate) confirmed the reports and predicted that it would sell more than one motion unit in its first week.

The album debuted at number one on both the daily and weekly Oricon Albums Chart, marking her final chart-topping position before her retirement. It sold 459,094 units on its first day and 1.113 million copies in its first week, the most of any artist that year. It was Amuro's best-selling first week sales since Sweet 19 Blues, which sold 1.921 million copies, and the first album to sell over a million copies in a single week since Utada Hikaru Single Collection Vol. 1 (2004) by Japanese-American singer Hikaru Utada.

Furthermore, Amuro had the highest first-week sales by a female artist since her own album Best Fiction in 2008, which sold 681,187 units. With just one week of sales, it became the first album in three years to sell over one million units, trailing only Japanese girl group AKB48's Tsugi no Ashiato (2014) and Amuro's sixth album to sell over one million units. Several Japanese publications cited the album's sales success, which was also recognised by Western media.

The album stayed on the daily chart, selling 225,295 copies on its second day. It remained at number one the weekly chart for two weeks, selling 321,956 and 158,984 units, respectively. With a varied trajectory, Finally spent 158 weeks on the charts, Amuro's longest run. The album peaked at number one on the Oricon Digital Albums Chart and number one on the Billboard Japan Hot Albums Chart, following a charting path similar to that of the Oricon Weekly Chart.

Finally sold 1.777 million copies in Japan by the end of 2017, becoming the best-selling album of the year and Amuro's first to do so. By the end of 2018, it had sold an additional 638,989 units, keeping it at the top of the Oricon Yearly Chart for the second consecutive year and becoming the first album to do so in 43 years. Finally was also named the highest-selling Japanese album of the 2010s decade, as well as her highest-selling compilation album and second best-selling record, trailing only Sweet 19 Blues, which sold over three million copies. The album was certified double million by the RIAJ for exceeding shipments of two million units.

== Track listing ==
Finally – Disc one
No.	Title	Writer(s)	Composers(s)	Length
1.	"Mister U.S.A. (Note: New vocals and arrangement)" (ミスターU.S.A.)	Masao Urino	Minoru Komorita	4:29
2.	"Aishite Muscat" (愛してマスカット)	Neko Oikawa	Minoru Komorita	4:06
3.	"Paradise Train (Note: New vocals)"	Masao Urino	Nakanishi Keizo	4:33
4.	"Try Me (Watashi o Shinjite)" (TRY ME～私を信じて～)	Kazumi Suzuki	Hinoky Team	4:01
5.	"Taiyou no Season" (太陽のSEASON)	Suzuki	Hinoky Team	3:32
6.	"Body Feels Exit"	Tetsuya Komuro	Komuro	4:24
7.	"Chase the Chance"	Komuro; Takahiro Maeda	Komuro	4:32
8.	"Don't Wanna Cry"	Komuro; Maeda	Komuro	5:47
9.	"You're My Sunshine"	Komuro	Komuro	5:50
10.	"Sweet 19 Blues"	Komuro	Komuro	5:37
11.	"A Walk in the Park"	Komuro	Komuro	5:39
12.	"Can You Celebrate?"	Komuro	Komuro	6:21
13.	"How to be a Girl"	Komuro; Marc Panther	Komuro	4:26
14.	"I Have Never Seen"	Komuro	Komuro	4:47
15.	"Respect the Power of Love"	Komuro	Komuro	4:23
16.	"Never End"	Komuro	Komuro	5:17

Finally – Disc two
No.	Title	Writer(s)	Composers(s)	Length
1.	"Say the Word"	Namie Amuro	Ronald Malmberg; Thomas Johansson	3:56
2.	"I Will"	Amuro	Hiroaki Hayama	5:35
3.	"So Crazy"	Full Force; Jennifer "JJ" Johnson; Michico; Tiger	Full Force; Johnson	4:33
4.	"Girl Talk"	Michico; T. Kura	Michico; T. Kura	4:23
5.	"Want Me, Want Me"	Michico	Sugi-V	3:12
6.	"Can't Sleep, Can't Eat, I'm Sick"	Michico	Michico; T. Kura	3:49
7.	"Baby Don't Cry"	Nao'ymt	Nao'ymt	5:22
8.	"Funky Town"	Michico	L.L.Brothers; Michico; T. Kura	3:48
9.	"New Look"	Michico; T. Kura	Michico; T. Kura	3:57
10.	"Rock Steady"	Michico; T. Kura	Michico; T. Kura	3:31
11.	"What a Feeling"	Michico; Shinchi Osawa	Michico; Shinchi Osawa	3:48
12.	"Dr."	Nao'ymt	Nao'ymt	5:48
13.	"Break It"	Nao'ymt	Nao'ymt	3:24
14.	"Get Myself Back"	Nao'ymt	Nao'ymt	4:35
15.	"Fight Together"	Nao'ymt	Nao'ymt	4:20
16.	"Tempest"	Nao'ymt	Nao'ymt	4:41
17.	"Sit! Stay! Wait! Down!"	Michico; T. Kura	Michico; T. Kura	3:17
18.	"Love Story"	Tiger	T-SK; Tesung Kim; Olivia Nervo; Miriam Nervo	4:42

Finally – Disc three
No.	Title	Writer(s)	Composers(s)	Length
1.	"Arigatou"	Michico; T. Kura	T. Kura	4:11
2.	"Damage"	Nao'ymt	Nao'ymt	4:50
3.	"Big Boys Cry"	Kanata Okajima; Nermin Harambašić; Anne Judith Wik; Ronny Svendsen; Hayley Aitken; Eirik Johansen; Jan Hallvard Larsen	Harambašić; Wik; Svendsen; Aitken; Johansen; Larsen	3:24
4.	"Contrail"	Nao'ymt	Nao'ymt	4:16
5.	"Tsuki"	Tiger	Zetton; Fast Lane; Lisa Desmond	3:38
6.	"Red Carpet (Note: New song)"	Matthew Tishler; Paula Winger; Stephanie Lewis; Tiger	Tishler; Winger; Lewis	3:43
7.	"Mint"	Maria Marcus; Andreas Oberg; Emyli; Tiger	Marcus; Oberg; Emyli	3:49
8.	"Hero"	Sunny Boy; Ryosuke Imai	Sunny Boy; Imai	5:37
9.	"Dear Diary"	Tishler; Felicia Barton; Aaron Bewared; Tiger	Tishler; Barton; Bewared; Tiger	3:29
10.	"Fighter"	Emyli	Emyli; Reason	3:28
11.	"Christmas Wish"	Marcus; Niclas Lundin; Emyli	Marcus; Lundin; Emyli	4:00
12.	"Just You and I"	Emyli; Franky Mio	Jenna Donnelly; Kiyohito Komatsu	3:38
13.	"Hope"	Mio; Ryo Ito; Tomo Low	Mio; Ito; Low	4:12
14.	"In Two"	Adam Kapit; Kenichi Anraku; Sorano; Ito	Kapit; Anraku; Sorano; Ito	3:57
15.	"How Do You Feel Now?"	Komuro	Komuro	3:50
16.	"Showtime"	Mio	Samuel Waermo; Marcus; Susumu Kawaguchi	3:06
17.	"Do It For Love"	Sunny Boy	Jerry Barnes; Chris Leon; Francis Cathcart; Kathrine Nicole Tucker; Kevin Nicolas Drew	4:21
18.	"Finally"	Emyli; Tishler; Barton; Charles	Tishler; Barton; Charles	3:39

Finally – DVD/Blu-ray disc
No.	Title	Director(s)	Length
1.	"Red Carpet"	Hisashi Kikuchi
2.	"Mint"	Naokazu Mitsuishi
3.	"Hero"
4.	"Dear Diary"	Ryouhei Shingu
5.	"Fighter"	Hiroaki Higashi
6.	"Christmas Wish"
7.	"Just You and I"
8.	"In Two"
9.	"How Do You Feel Now?"
10.	"Showtime"
11.	"Do It For Love"
12.	"Finally"

=== Additional details ===
- Pre-ordered versions came with a special slipcase package and a bonus B2-sized poster. Seven posters were released in seven different stores, including Seven Net, Amazon, Rakuten, Tower Records, Tsutaya, HMV, WonderGoo, Mu-mo, and others.
- Limited Fan Space edition — Customers' names are printed on the jewelcase spine, along with a special card written digitally by Namie Amuro.

== Charts ==
=== Weekly charts ===
Chart (2017)	Peak position
Japanese Albums (Billboard Japan)	1
Japanese Albums (Oricon)	1

=== Year-end charts ===
Chart (2017)	Position
Japanese Albums (Billboard Japan)	1
Japanese Albums (Oricon)	1

2000 year-end charts for First Love
Chart (2018)	Position
Japanese Albums (Billboard Japan)	1
Japanese Albums (Oricon)	1
Taiwanese East Asian Albums (G-Music)	1

=== Decade-end charts ===
Chart (2010–2019)	Position
Japanese Albums (Oricon)	1

== Certifications and sales ==
Region	Certification	Certified units/sales
Japan (RIAJ)	2× Million	2,464,327

== Release history ==
Finally release history
Region	Date	Format	Label	Ref(s).
Japan	November 8, 2017	3CD; Blu-ray; DVD	Dimension Point	
China	November 24, 2017	3CD; DVD	Dimension Point	
Hong Kong	November 24, 2017	3CD; DVD	Dimension Point	
South East Asia	November 24, 2017	3CD; DVD	Dimension Point	
Various	June 16, 2019	Digital download; streaming	Dimension Point	

== See also ==
- List of best-selling albums in Japan
- List of Billboard Japan Hot Albums number ones of 2017
- List of Oricon number-one albums of 2017
