= Mint (Namie Amuro song) =

- CD and digital cover artwork.

Single by Namie Amuro

from the album Finally
- B-side: "Chit Chat"
- Released: May 18, 2016
- Recorded: 2016
- Genre: Dance
- Length: 3:50
- Label: Avex Trax; Dimension Point; Avex Music Creative Inc.
- Songwriters: Andreas Öberg; Emyli; Maria Marcus; Tiger
- Producers: Andreas Öberg; Maria Marcus

Namie Amuro singles chronology
"Red Carpet" (2015)	"Mint" (2016)	"Hero" (2016)

"Mint" is the 44th single by Japanese singer Namie Amuro. It was released on May 18, 2016 in Japan and May 27, 2016 in Taiwan as a CD single, DVD single, and worldwide on May 18 as a digital download by Avex Trax, Avex Taiwan and Amuro's own label Dimension Point. It also served as Amuro's fifth non-album maxi single, after the release of her December 2015 single "Red Carpet", and features the B-side song "Chit Chat". The track was written by Andreas Öberg, Emyli, Maria Marcus, and Tiger, while production was handled by Oberg and Marcus.

Musically, "Mint" is a dance song that incorporates musical elements of contemporary R&B, EDM, and rock music. The lyrical content for both "Mint" and "Chit Chat" includes English and Japanese language, with the former discussing themes of lust and love. "Mint" received positive reviews from music critics. Some critics commended the production of the track, complimenting the composition and Amuro's vocal performance.

Commercially, the song performed moderately on the Oricon Singles Chart in Japan, reaching number four. However, it performed better on the Japan Hot 100, reaching number two and was certified Platinum by the Recording Industry Association of Japan (RIAJ) for digital sales of 250,000 units. An accompanying music video was directed by Naokazu Mitsuishi, which displays Amuro and 36 female backup dancers in a dark-blue room. To promote the single, it was used as the theme song for the Japanese television drama series Bokuno Yabai Tsuma (translated to My Sick Wife). Alongside this, "Mint" will be included in the setlist for her 2016 Live Style concert tour in Japan.

== Background and composition ==
After the release of Amuro's twelfth studio album Genic (2015), she started to release non-album maxi singles. The first entry was "Red Carpet", which was performed through her Asian-wide concert tour name Livegenic 2015–2016. Despite its performance, it did not appear on the live release Livegenic 2015-2016. Then on March 31, music publication Jame World confirmed the release of a new single on May 18, which was revealed to be "Mint". It was confirmed on Amuro's website that "Mint" would be used as the official theme song to the Fuji TV Japanese television drama series Bokuno Yabai Tsuma. The production team for the television series approached Amuro's record label, Dimension Point, to participate in recording a song for the show, which she approved. Regarding the song, Amuro commented; "I'm thankful to have received the offer to provide the theme song. It's a fast-paced, thrilling track told from a women's perspective. I'll be happy if this song captured the essence of the drama."

"Mint" was written by Andreas Öberg, Emyli, Maria Marcus, and Tiger, while production was handled by Oberg and Marcus; it was also composed by Oberg, Emyli, and Marcus. According to Amuro, she described the composition and production of the song as "thrilling". Musically, it is a dance song that incorporates musical elements of contemporary R&B, EDM, and rock music. Writing for Entertainment Weekly, Joey Nolfi described "Mint" as a "a wonderfully whacky mix of electric, surf-rocking guitars, R&B chants, and a pulsating EDM breakdown,". A staff member at Tokyo Girls Update analysised the composition, and noted the use of "hard-hitting beats and some slithery guitar lines". A staff member from Japanese magazine CD Journal noted the musical element of grime in its composition. The lyrical content for both "Mint" and "Chit Chat" includes English and Japanese language.

== Release ==
Four weeks before its initial release on May 18, "Mint" had leaked fully online. The single was released in Japan and Taiwan as a CD single, DVD single, and as a digital EP by Avex Trax and Amuro's own label Dimension Point. All three editions included the normal versions and instrumentals of "Mint" and the B-side track "Chit Chat". "Chit Chat" was written by Andreas Öberg, Emyli, Maria Marcus, and Tiger, and was described by a CD Journal staff member as a "happy house" song. The bonus DVD included the music video of "Mint". On May 18, first press issues at CDJapan.com offered a B2-size poster of the CD artwork. The CD and digital artwork features a close-up of Amuro in a gold dress, whilst the CD and DVD bundle has a body shot with her holding a gold shoe.

== Critical response ==
Upon its release, "Mint" received positive reviews from music critics. A staff member at Tokyo Girls Update enjoyed the song, and felt that the instrumentation complemented Amuro's vocals well. Similarly, a member from CD Journal enjoyed the song's music, and praised how other musical genres such as electronic dance and grime music in the song complemented the overall J-pop influence. The reviewer also highlighted the B-side track "Chit Chat" as a good contribution to the maxi release. A Japanese reviewer from Amazon also commended the production and composition, labelling it as "memorable" and "impressive". Entertainment Weekly writer Joey Nolfi selected it amongst six other songs as one of his best tracks of Summer 2016. With this selection, he commented that the amount of musical genres such as EDM and R&B "showcas[es] the sonic bravura that makes J-Pop some of the most interesting music on the planet."

== Commercial performance ==
Commercially, "Mint" was a moderate success in Japan. The song debuted at number four on the Oricon Singles Chart, selling 28,136 units in its first week. Despite it being one of Amuro's lowest first week sales for a single in her career, the single marked 22 years of top ten singles released by Amuro, one of the only distinctions by any solo artist in Japan. It slipped to number 21 the following week, selling 5,245 units, one of Amuro's largest drops on the Oricon chart. By the end of May 2016, it was ranked at number 10 on their Monthly chart and sold 33,381 units. It spent nine weeks in the Top 200 chart, and sold 46,231 by October 2017.

Digitally, "Mint" and "Chit Chat" was a success in Japan. On the Japan Hot 100 chart, hosted by Billboard, the former track entered at number 56 on the fourth week, whilst the latter entered at 48 on the final week of May 2016. During that same final week in May, "Mint" reached number four and the top spot on the Billboard Japan Singles Sales Chart, and the Billboard Japan Radio Songs chart. The following week, the single slipped to number five on the chart, and fell outside the top 10 during its seventh week. In June 2016, "Mint" was certified Platinum by the Recording Industry Association of Japan (RIAJ) for digital sales of 250,000 units; this is her first certification since her 2014 single "Brighter Day".

== Music video and promotion ==
An accompanying music video was directed by Naokazu Mitsuishi. It opens with a long shot of Amuro and 36 female backup dancers in a dark-lit blue room. During the first verse and pre-chorus, Amuro is seen walking around the dancers and sings the song. Once the chorus starts, Amuro takes of her cape and dances in a small suit, along with the dancers. Inter cut scenes feature Amuro on a large platform with a long pink dress and flower crown, singing the track in a further distance between her and the dancers. The video received positive reviews from publications, including a critique by Arama Japan, who labelled it "simple" yet "stylish" and "impressive". To promote the single, "Mint" was used as the theme song for the Japanese television drama series Bokuno Yabai Tsuma (translated to My Sick Wife). Alongside this, "Mint" will be included in the setlist for her 2016 Live Style concert tour, to be held in Japan.

== Track listings and formats ==
- CD single
1. "Mint" – 3:50
2. "Chit Chat" – 3:45
3. "Mint" (Instrumental) – 3:50
4. "Chit Chat" (Instrumental) – 3:45
- DVD single
1. "Mint" – 3:50
2. "Chit Chat" – 3:45
3. "Mint" (Instrumental) – 3:50
4. "Chit Chat" (Instrumental) – 3:45
5. "Mint" (Music video)
- Digital download
1. "Mint" – 3:50
2. "Chit Chat" – 3:45
3. "Mint" (Instrumental) – 3:50
4. "Chit Chat" (Instrumental) – 3:45

== Personnel ==
Credits adapted from the CD liner notes of "Mint"';

Recording

- Recorded by Wataru Namifusa in Tokyo, Japan, 2016.

Credits

- Namie Amuro – vocals, background vocals
- Masaru Yoshikawa – art direction
- Emyli – songwriting, composing, vocal production, backing vocals
- Andreas Öberg – guitar, producing, composing, songwriting
- Tom Coyne – mastering
- D.O.I. – mixing
- Maria Marcus – songwriting, composing, producing
- Tisch – photography
- Wataru Namifusa – vocal recording
- Tiger – songwriting
- Takuro Iwagami – cinematography
- Naokazu Mitsuishi – music video director
- Hirohisa Ishihara – music video producer

== Charts ==
=== Daily and weekly charts ===
Chart (2016)	Peak position
Japan Weekly Singles (Oricon)	4
Japan Hot 100 (Billboard)	2
Japan Hot 100 (Billboard) "Chit Chat" B-side	48
Japan Hot Singles Sales (Billboard)	4
Japan Radio Songs (Billboard)	1

=== Monthly chart ===
Chart (2016)	Peak position
Japan Monthly Singles (Oricon)	10

=== Yearly charts ===
2016 year-end chart performance of "Mint"
Chart (2016)	Position
Japan (Billboard Japan Hot 100)	41
Japanese Radio Songs (Billboard Japan)	82

== Certification ==
Region	Certification	Certified units/sales
Japan (RIAJ) Digital sales	Platinum	250,000^{*}
^{*} Sales figures based on certification alone.

== Release history ==
Region	Date	Format	Label
Japan	May 18, 2016	CD	Avex Trax; Dimension Point
Japan	May 18, 2016	CD and DVD	Avex Trax; Dimension Point
Japan	May 18, 2016	Digital download	Avex Music Creative Inc.
Australia	May 18, 2016	Digital download	Avex Music Creative Inc.
New Zealand	May 18, 2016	Digital download	Avex Music Creative Inc.
United Kingdom	May 18, 2016	Digital download	Avex Music Creative Inc.
Ireland	May 18, 2016	Digital download	Avex Music Creative Inc.
Germany	May 18, 2016	Digital download	Avex Music Creative Inc.
Spain	May 18, 2016	Digital download	Avex Music Creative Inc.
France	May 18, 2016	Digital download	Avex Music Creative Inc.
Italy	May 18, 2016	Digital download	Avex Music Creative Inc.
Taiwan	May 18, 2016	Digital download	Avex Music Creative Inc.
Taiwan	May 27, 2016	CD	Avex Taiwan; Dimension Point
Taiwan	May 27, 2016	CD and DVD	Avex Taiwan; Dimension Point
