= Genic =

- Digital and bonus DVD cover

Studio album by Namie Amuro
- Released: June 10, 2015
- Recorded: 2014–2015
- Studios: ABS Recordings (Tokyo, Japan); Bunkamura Recordings (Tokyo); LAB Recorders (Tokyo); Prime Sound (Tokyo)
- Genres: Pop; EDM; R&B
- Length: 49:00
- Languages: English; Japanese
- Label: Dimension Point
- Producers: David Guetta; James "Keyz" Foye; Bardur Haberg; Erik Lidbom; Mighty Mike; Skylar Mones; Joacim "Twin" Persson; SeventyEight; Sophie

Namie Amuro chronology
Ballada (2014)	Genic (2015)	Finally (2017)

Genic (stylized as _genic) is the twelfth and final studio album by Japanese singer Namie Amuro. It was released on various physical and digital formats on June 10, 2015 by Amuro’s label Dimension Point, and serves as the singer's final studio album before her retirement in September 2018. Amuro began working on the album in 2014 and received over 200 demo recordings from her team, which included a diverse group of collaborators. Finally, she chose tracks based on their introductions and what was trending in music at the time.

Stylistically, Genic is influenced by electronic dance music from the 1970s and 1980s, and R&B elements from the 1990s, with additional elements of pop, rock, house, and electronic music. Lyrically, the album addresses topics including self-empowerment, fun, glamour, and fashion. Genic is also Amuro’s third bilingual record; the majority of the songs on the album are in English, with a few Japanese phrases interspersed.

Music critics gave Genic positive reviews, with many praising the album's mix of sounds, production quality, and overall appeal. However, some reviewers were divided on Amuro's English delivery and use of EDM music. Since its release, Genic and its material have received numerous nominations and accolades. It was a commercial success in Japan, reaching number one on the Oricon Albums Chart and component charts provided by Billboard Japan, and was certified platinum by the Recording Industry Association of Japan (RIAJ) for exceeding sales of 250,000 units.

Genic did not have any singles before its release, but her cover of "What I Did for Love" with French DJ David Guetta was released as a promotional single. Several songs from the album received music videos and commercial attention, particularly "Golden Touch", which was highlighted by Western media. To promote the album, Amuro embarked on her Livegenic tour throughout Asia, as well as her annual Live Style show, which included songs from Genic on the set list. Following each tour, a live release was subsequently distributed.

== Background ==
In 2013, Amuro established her own record label, Dimension Point, in collaboration with Avex Trax. Originally, the singer planned to leave Avex and management company Vision Factory (now Rising Production) after seventeen years. However, Avex confirmed that Dimension Point would be implemented to give Amuro control over her music and personal projects. Her first offering from the label was her eleventh studio and second bilingual album, Feel (2013). Following this, she released a succession of stand-alone singles: "Tsuki" (January 2014) and "Brighter Day" (November 2014).

In January 2015, Japanese media reported Amuro's intention to work with American collaborators, with her relocating to Los Angeles, California, to improve her English and incorporate it into her music. That same month, she left Vision Factory after 22 years to start Stella88, a private agency through Dimension Point. Amuro confirmed the release of Genic in May. A visualiser, which included lyric videos for all 12 unpublished recordings, was on trial that same month until the end of the month, and Amuro's website also hosted a special website dedicated to the album's release and promotional campaign.

== Production and development ==
"I always try to include 'my identity'. I try to not play it too safe... how to put it... I always want to express something that’s a step forward from the previous album. Maybe this time the new 'something' is expressed by things like including only new songs and the word Genic."

— Amuro discussing the album's overall theme.

Production on Genic began in mid-2014, while Amuro was on her annual Live Style tour. Amuro told Japanese fashion magazine Sweet that she wanted to create an album that sounded "trendy" at the time, while also drawing inspiration from sounds and aesthetics from the 1970s to 1990s. She stated that her "staff understands my vision and made a selection of demos for me. As always, I chose the songs which instantly felt right to me." Amuro attempted not to "play it too safe" and instead "express something that's a step forward from the previous album."

Amuro and her team received over 200 demo recordings to listen to and choose from. She quickly selected each song based on the intro sections that she thought made an impression on her. However, she was dissatisfied with the full length of the demos and requested that each one be reworked except for the intro, saying, "To be honest, I hardly ever ask for demos to be changed like that. This might be the first time I’ve gone so far. I wanted those intros on my album that much." Two of the songs chosen were collaborations: "B Who I Want 2 B" with Japanese Vocaloid Hatsune Miku (sampled from a piece by British producer Sophie) and a cover of "What I Did for Love" with French DJ David Guetta.

During the sessions, Amuro decided to include only new recordings on the album, her first since Dance Tracks Vol. 1 in 1995. Amuro had previously released "Tsuki" and "Brighter Day", both of which featured B-side tracks on various formats. According to Amuro, her team had discussed including the songs in Genic. However, she rejected the idea because she believed it would interfere with the album's concept, sound, and tempo. Furthermore, each single and its B-side were released as commercial tie-ins, which Amuro was opposed to, putting that decision at risk for Genic.

The songs chosen were all written in English, with some phrases written in Japanese by previous collaborators Tiger and Emyli. Amuro found the original demo, which included English lyrics, difficult and "were often translated opposite of what I intended". She wanted each song to convey a different message, and she thought that incorporating Japanese into a mostly-English record would be a "puzzle". She said, "I’ll take up the challenge of solving that puzzle because I also have the desire to rattle people more. Also, I think there are puzzles which only the people who bought the album can solve!"

== Music and content ==
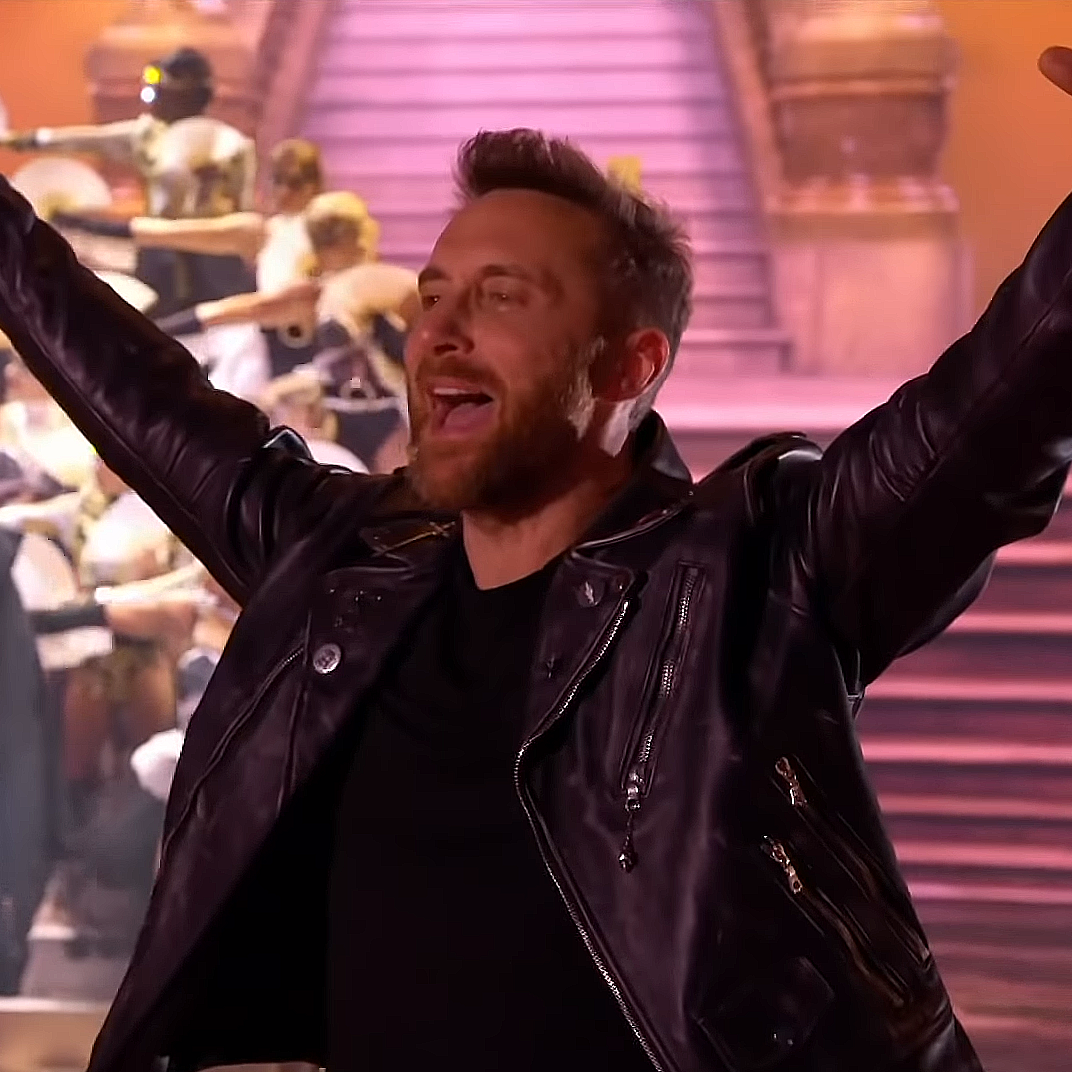
Amuro features on the song "What I Did for Love", which was originally released by French DJ David Guetta (pictured).

The sound on Genic is divided between 1970s-1980s electronic dance music and 1990s R&B, with lyrics that focus on self-empowerment, fun, glamour, and fashion. According to Lauren du Plessis of Electric Bloom, the album covers all of her career genres: "there's some ultra-fluffy teen pop, flashes of her R'n'B phase, and plenty of popular dance elements." Similarly, The Japan Times writer Patrick St. Michel found the album influenced by EDM, but he also noted "diverse" genres such as europop and contemporary pop music. In a similar review, Kenichi Shirahara of Utalabo compared the sound to Amuro's previous studio album Feel while also identifying new wave and disco elements in Genic.

Genic begins with "Photogenic", an R&B-influenced song with heavy guitar riffs and narcissistic lyrics; the line "Strike a pose" has been compared to "Vogue" by American singer Madonna. "Time Has Come" is a dance track with 8-bit sounds and varying tempos, starting with a slow keyboard intro and progressing to a fast-paced rock chorus. "Golden Touch" was noted for its retro vibe, blending R&B and pop elements, love-inspired lyrics, and a joyful chorus, and was compared to the work of American singer Ariana Grande. "Birthday" is a pop song with a fast-paced rap section that has been compared to the work of American singer Katy Perry due to its upbeat and girly tone. "It" is a rhythmic love song with whistling, handclaps, and bouncy keyboards, using the playground game tag as a metaphor for falling in love.

"Scream" is an upbeat electronic dance song with heavy club influences that discusses having fun at a nightclub. "Fashionista" is a fast-paced EDM and R&B song that focuses on self-love and empowerment through fashion. "Fly" is an upbeat EDM track with dubstep and rock influences that lyrically explores the highlights of a luxurious lifestyle. "B Who I Want 2 B" is a collaboration with Hatsune Miku. Miku was initially advertised as the anagram U Hum Speak It when Genic was first announced. Sophie created it as a demo track in 2014 and gave it to Amuro during the early production sessions. Musically, it is an electronic track with influences from bubblegum pop and computer music, while the artificial vocal deliveries and sound have been described as having an uncanny valley effect.

"Stranger" is an aggressive EDM track with elements of trance and subtle dubstep music. "Every Woman" is an upbeat rhythmic dance track about female empowerment, whereas "Space Invader" is a cheerful pop song with R&B and reggaeton elements. The album's closing ballad, "Anything", focuses on Amuro's vocals and acoustic instrumentation. Lyrically, it is an empowering anthem about self-confidence and the value of believing in oneself. "What I Did for Love" is a bonus track on the album that is a cover song featuring David Guetta as the lead artist, but omits the original vocalist, British singer Emeli Sande. Musically, it is a dance song with soulful vocals by Amuro.

== Release and formats ==
"The album title Genic means a person who flourishes at something. For example, photogenic or videogenic. I want people to decide what kind of genic this album and Namie Amuro represent once they’ve listened to the album. Maybe dancegenic or soundgenic. That’s why I left the (lowercase dash) in front of Genic."

— Amuro talking about the album title.

Dimension Point released Genic on June 10, 2015, in a variety of formats. All formats included 14 songs totalling more than 49 minutes in length. The physical versions included a standard disc with all featured songs, while the DVD and Blu-ray included music videos for "Golden Touch", "Birthday", "Fashionista", "Stranger", and "Anything". Hidden footage on the DVD and Blu-ray versions also included a special selfie video for "Birthday" and a dance-only visual for "Fashionista". The standard version of Genic was then released through digital and music streaming services, and was physically distributed in Hong Kong and Taiwan.

Tisch photographed the album's cover art, which shows Amuro dressed in black and wearing a black-lace veil. Jun Hirota later created the art direction and booklet for the album. Standard jewelcase packaging includes close-up shots of Amuro, whereas digipak versions include various cut-out shapes that hold the booklet but only show parts of Amuro's face; each format includes a different shot of Amuro. The title Genic refers to the title track "Photogenic"; however, Amuro believed that the term "genic" could be interpreted in a variety of ways.

== Promotional content ==
"Namie Amuro and the record label reached out to me, to create something more than just her singing and performing in front of camera, which is the case for most of her videos [...] She gave our team the complete freedom, which was amazing. She and the label immediately grasped the ideas when we presented to them, and gave us full autonomy of the project."

— Director Masashi Kawamura talking about the video concept for "Golden Touch".

Amuro had stated that she planned to release Genic without any singles. However, "What I Did for Love" with David Guetta was released as a promotional single on July 1, 2015, across digital and streaming platforms. Despite this, several songs from the album experienced success. Amuro released music videos for "Golden Touch", "Birthday", "Fashionista", "Stranger", and "Anything" on her YouTube channel. During the album's release week, "Birthday" and "Golden Touch" were successful in Japan, with "Birthday" reaching number 36 on the Billboard Japan Hot 100 and "Golden Touch" reaching number 43 on the Billboard Japan Radio Songs chart.

Western media highlighted the video for “Golden Touch”, which was hailed as her international breakthrough. Several publications featured the music video. Elle compared the video to the sensation of optical illusions, describing it as "Colorful, fun, gay ... but especially interactive." According to Japan Trends, they felt "Golden Touch" is "a good marketing stunt for a dying industry, and overseas media has picked up the story too". British publication Creative Review named it their music video of the month. On June 5, "Golden Touch" premiered in North America on SiriusXM Hits 1 as part of their YouTube 15 schedule, hosted and chosen by American YouTube personality Jenna Marbles. Following the original music video's 10 million views on YouTube, a second video featuring Amuro premiered.

In October 2015, Amuro and Hatsune Miku appeared as computer-generated characters on the cover of fashion magazine Nylon. With their appearance, Amuro confirmed that the two would collaborate on a music video. That same month, Nylon TV premiered the music video for "B Who I Want 2 B", which featured the singers in both two-dimensional and three-dimensional animated form.

== Livegenic Tour ==
Namie Amuro Livegenic 2015–2016
- Tour by Namie Amuro
- Official DVD and promotional artwork.
- Associated album: Genic
- Start date: September 5, 2015
- End date: March 26, 2016
- Legs: 2
- No. of shows: 47

Namie Amuro concert chronology
- Live Style 2014 (2012); Namie Amuro Livegenic 2015–2016 (2013); Live Style 2016–2017 (2014)

Prior to its release, Amuro promoted Genic on various Japanese radio stations. In June 2015, she announced her Livegenic tour, which included flyers of the tour in the album booklet. The Livegenic tour included 47 shows across Japan, starting on September 5 at the Saitama Super Arena and ending on February 10 at the Makuhari Messe Event Hall in Chiba Prefecture. She expanded her tour to include two shows in Taiwan and one in Hong Kong. Dimension Point hosted a special website featuring photos, digest films, and other tour-related content.

A live video was recorded at the Yoyogi National Gymnasium on December 8 and released in a variety of physical formats on March 2, 2016. The track list features 29 songs from the show, including two bonus tracks "Break It" and "Arigatou" recorded at the Miyagi Super Arena, and a hidden video track of Amuro's song "Birthday". The live releases achieved success in Japan, topping the Oricon DVD and Blu-ray charts, and was certified gold by the Recording Industry Association of Japan (RIAJ) for exceeding 100,000 units in the region.

=== Set list ===
DVD track list
1. "What I Did for Love"
2. "Close Your Eyes, Close to You"
3. "Fly"
4. "Photogenic"
5. "Naked"
6. "Time Has Come"
7. "Space Invader"
8. "Brighter Day"
9. "It"
10. "B Who I Want 2 B"
11. "Sit! Stay! Wait! Down!"
12. "Say the Word"
13. "Sweet Kisses"
14. "Golden Touch"
15. "Get Myself Back"
16. "Black Diamond"
17. "Grotesque"
18. "Revolution"
19. "Dr."
20. "Red Carpet"
21. "Tsuki"
22. "Black Make-Up"
23. "Every Woman"
24. "Stranger"
25. "Scream"
26. "Fashionista"
27. "Birthday"
28. "Anything"
29. "Fight Together"
30. "Arigatou" (Miyagi Sekisui Heim Super Arena [Bonus track])
31. "Break It" (Miyagi Sekisui Heim Super Arena [Bonus track])

=== Shows ===
Date	City	Country	Venue
September 5, 2015	Saitama	Japan	Saitama Super Arena
September 6, 2015	Saitama	Japan	Saitama Super Arena
September 12, 2015	Fukui	Japan	Sun Dome Fukui
September 13, 2015	Fukui	Japan	Sun Dome Fukui
September 18, 2015	Fukuoka	Japan	Fukuoka Convention Center
September 19, 2015	Fukuoka	Japan	Fukuoka Convention Center
September 26, 2015	Hokkaido	Japan	Hokkaido Prefectural Sports Center
September 27, 2015	Hokkaido	Japan	Hokkaido Prefectural Sports Center
October 3, 2015	Osaka	Japan	Osaka-jō Hall
October 4, 2015	Osaka	Japan	Osaka-jō Hall
October 10, 2015	Hiroshima	Japan	Hiroshima Prefectural Sports Center
October 11, 2015	Hiroshima	Japan	Hiroshima Prefectural Sports Center
October 17, 2015	Nagano	Japan	Big Hat
October 18, 2015	Nagano	Japan	Big Hat
October 27, 2015	Osaka	Japan	Osaka-jō Hall
October 28, 2015	Osaka	Japan	Osaka-jō Hall
October 30, 2015	Osaka	Japan	Osaka-jō Hall
November 3, 2015	Osaka	Japan	Osaka-jō Hall
November 14, 2015	Miyagi	Japan	Sekisui Heim Super Arena
November 15, 2015	Miyagi	Japan	Sekisui Heim Super Arena
November 20, 2015	Kobe	Japan	World Memorial Hall
November 21, 2015	Kobe	Japan	World Memorial Hall
November 23, 2015	Kobe	Japan	World Memorial Hall
December 2, 2015	Tokyo	Japan	Yoyogi National Gymnasium
December 3, 2015	Tokyo	Japan	Yoyogi National Gymnasium
December 8, 2015	Tokyo	Japan	Yoyogi National Gymnasium
December 9, 2015	Tokyo	Japan	Yoyogi National Gymnasium
December 11, 2015	Tokyo	Japan	Yoyogi National Gymnasium
December 15, 2015	Tokyo	Japan	Yoyogi National Gymnasium
December 16, 2015	Tokyo	Japan	Yoyogi National Gymnasium
December 19, 2015	Nagoya	Japan	Nippon Gaishi Hall
December 20, 2015	Nagoya	Japan	Nippon Gaishi Hall
December 26, 2015	Fukuoka	Japan	Fukuoka Convention Center
December 27, 2015	Fukuoka	Japan	Fukuoka Convention Center
January 16, 2016	Niigata	Japan	Toki Messe
January 17, 2016	Niigata	Japan	Toki Messe
January 23, 2016	Maebashi	Japan	Green Dome Maebashi
January 24, 2016	Maebashi	Japan	Green Dome Maebashi
January 30, 2016	Shizuoka	Japan	Shizuoka Stadium
January 31, 2016	Shizuoka	Japan	Shizuoka Stadium
February 3, 2016	Nagoya	Japan	Nippon Gaishi Hall
February 4, 2016	Nagoya	Japan	Nippon Gaishi Hall
February 9, 2016	Chiba	Japan	Makuhari Messe
February 10, 2016	Chiba	Japan	Makuhari Messe
March 5, 2016	Taipei	Taiwan	Taipei Arena
March 6, 2016	Taipei	Taiwan	Taipei Arena
March 5, 2016	Hong Kong	China	Asia World–Arena

== Critical reception ==
Professional ratings
Review scores
Source	Rating
Billboard Japan	(positive)
CDJournal	(positive)
Electric Bloom	(positive)
The Japan Times	(positive)
Pitchfork	(6.7/10)

Genic received positive reviews from music critics. Billboard Japan praised the album's "colourful" mix of genres, describing it as a "whole body of work". Japanese magazine CDJournal praised Amuro's decision not to release any singles from the album, giving it an overall "bullishness" quality. They called the album "smart" and praised the collaborations with Guetta and Miku. Lauren Du Pressis of Electric Bloom described the singer as a "chameleon force in the music industry" due to her musical exploration and mature image. Despite criticism of the album's "repetitive" nature and collaborations, Du Pressis recommended it for J-pop listeners seeking a more mature sound; "You can't hide from an album this infectious."

Patrick St. Michel wrote two reviews for Genic. Writing for Pitchfork, he praised the album's "confident" and "inspired" vibe, and felt this was her best EDM offering after her previous efforts, which he described as "cheap replicas". Despite his reservations about her English delivery and some productions, such as "Every Woman", "It", and "What I Did for Love", he concluded that Genic's best moments were the "most straightforward". For The Japan Times, he wrote, "Her busy EDM songs don't always work and her English delivery still needs practice, but Genic is a solid collection of catchy pop tunes... It’s a heck of a comeback, and a well-earned one at that."

Amuro received numerous nominations and accolades for Genic. "Anything" won the DOTD category at the Design Awards Asia, the Design Award at the FWA Design Awards, and the Best Innovative Integration Bronze Award at the Spike Asia Awards in 2015. For the Design Award Asia awards, it received three specific ranking strategies: creativity (8.4 points), its content (8 points), and its visuals (7.8 points). "Birthday" was nominated for Video of the Year, and won Best Female Video, at the 2015 MTV Video Music Awards Japan. "Golden Touch" won the DOTM category at the Design Awards Asia, and was awarded silver for the Top Japanese Gold Songs ranked by RTHK International Pop Poll Awards.

== Commercial performance ==
Nielsen SoundScan Japan (now Luminate) predicted that Genic would top the Oricon Albums Chart and Billboard Japan's Top Albums Sales chart, surpassing the work of Japanese acts Mr. Children and Superfly. As expected, Genic topped both the Top Albums and Top Albums Sales charts, and spent 25 weeks on both charts. Genic then debuted at number one on the Oricon daily chart, selling 81,491 units. Furthermore, it debuted at number one on the weekly chart, selling 160,474 units, her third lowest first-week sales since Break the Rules (2000) and Style (2003).

Despite this, Genic became the best-selling album by a female artist in 2015, surpassing White by Superfly. By the end of June, the album had reached number two on the monthly chart. By the end of the year, Genic had sold 246,269 units, making Amuro the best-selling solo artist and female artist of the year. The album was certified platinum by the RIAJ for exceeding sales of 250,000 units.

== Track listing ==
Genic track listing
No.	Title	Lyrics	Producer(s)	Length
1.	"Photogenic"	Andreas Oberg; Emyli; Maria Marcus	Marcus	3:28
2.	"Time Has Come"	Erik Lidbom	Marcus	3:46
3.	"Golden Touch"	Andy Love; Joacim Persson; Johan Alkenäs; Nikki Flores; Tiger	Persson; Alkenäs	3:31
4.	"Birthday"	Emyli	Jakob Hazell; Svante Halldin	3:08
5.	"It"	Bárður Háberg; Hiten Bharadia; Óli Jógvansson; Raphaella Mazaheri-Asadi	Háberg; Mazaheri-Asadi	2:45
6.	"Scream"	Erik Lidbom	Lidbom; Jon Hällgren	3:44
7.	"Fashionista"	Emyli; Jenna Donnelly; Scott Stoddart	Stoddard	3:33
8.	"Fly"	David Wade; Mike Hunnid; Skylar Mones; Sunny Boy	Mones; Sunny Boy	3:22
9.	"B Who I Want 2 B" (featuring Hatsune Miku)	Mitchie M; Sophie	Sophie	2:52
10.	"Stranger"	Marcus; Shikata; Sky Beatz; Tiger	Hiro; Sky Beatz	3:37
11.	"Every Woman"	Barbi Escobar; Chris Meyer; Kevin Charge	Charge	3:02
12.	"Space Invader"	Cait La Dee; Gennessee Lewis; Michael McGarity	Mighty Mike	3:15
13.	"Anything"	Anthony Franks; James "Keyz" Foye	Foye	4:51
Total length:				49:00

Special track
No.	Title	Lyrics	Producer(s)	Length
14.	"What I Did for Love" (featuring David Guetta)	Breyan Stanley Isaac; David Guetta; Giorgio Tuinfort; Jason Evigan; Sam Martin; Sean Douglas	Guetta; Tuinfort	3:50

DVD and Blu-ray content
No.	Title	Director(s)	Length
1.	"Golden Touch" (Music video)	Kenji Yamashita; Masashi Kawamura
2.	"Birthday" (Music video)	Haruka Furuya
3.	"Fashionista" (Music video)	Daichi Yasuda
4.	"Stranger" (Music video)	Yasuda
5.	"Anything" (Music video)	Wataru Saito
6.	"Birthday" (Making video)
7.	"Fashionista" (Dance video)

== Credits and personnel ==
Credits adapted from the liner notes of Genic.

Locations

- Recorded at ABS Recordings, Bunkamura Recordings, LAB Recorders, and Prime Sound Studios in Tokyo, Japan. Mixed at Daimonion Recordings in Tokyo, Japan. Mastered at Sterling Studios in New York City.

Musicians

- Namie Amuro – main vocals, background vocals
- Gary Adkins – chorus vocals
- Alisa – chorus vocals
- Namie Amuro – main vocals
- Olivia Burrell – chorus vocals
- Jeroen de Rijk – tambourines
- Sean Douglas – keyboards
- Emyli – chorus vocals additional background vocals
- Bardur Haberg – all instruments
- Hatsune Miku – vocals
- Breyan Stanley Isaac – vocal background
- Singo Kubota – guitar
- Jocab Luttrell – vocal background
- Sam Martin – keyboards
- Neue Philharmonic Frankfurt – orchestra
- Andreas Oberg – guitar, synth bass guitar
- Candace Shields – vocal background
- Giorgio Tuinfort – piano

Imagery

- Wakana Chiba – creative coordination
- Jun Hirota – design
- Eichi Matsunaga – manicurist
- Akemi Nakano – hair, make-up
- Akira Noda – stylist
- Toshiyuki Suzuki – art direction
- Tisch– photographer

Production

- Johan Alkenas – producer
- Sky Beatz – track producer
- Kevin Charge – producer
- Tom Coyne – mastering
- Dimension Point – sound production, A&R
- D.O.I. – mixing
- Hiro Doi – music producer
- James "Keyz" Foye – producer
- David Guetta – instrumentation, producer, programmer
- Bardur Haberg – producer
- Jon Hällgren – producer
- Kohei Hatakeyama – vocal recording
- Svante Halldin – producer
- Jakob Hazell – producer
- Hirofumi Iwanaga – Hatsune Miku vocal production coordination
- Erik Lidbom – producer
- Maria Marcus – producer
- Raphaella Mazaheri-Asadi – vocal arrangement, vocal production
- Mighty Mike – producer
- Mitchie M – Hatsune Miku vocal production
- Skylar Mones – producer
- Wataru Namiusa – vocal recording
- Joacim Persson – producer
- Wataru Sasaki – Hatsune Miku vocal production coordination
- Sophie – producer
- Stella88& – management
- Scott Stoddart – producer
- Sunny Boy – producer
- Giorgio Tuinfort – instrumentation, producer, programmer
- Sam Wheat – recording engineer

== Charts ==
=== Weekly charts ===
Chart (2015–2016)	Peak position
Japanese Albums (Oricon)	1
Japanese Hot Albums (Billboard Japan)	1
Japanese Top Albums (Billboard Japan)	1

=== Monthly charts ===
Chart (2015)	Peak position
Japanese Albums (Oricon)	2

=== Year-end charts ===
Chart (2015)	Position
Japanese Albums (Oricon)	16

== Certifications ==
Region	Certification	Certified units/sales
Japan (RIAJ)	Platinum	250,000^{^}
^{^} Shipments figures based on certification alone.

== Release history ==
Genic release history
Region	Date	Format	Label	Ref(s).
Japan	June 10, 2015	CD; Blu-ray; DVD; digital download; streaming	Dimension Point	
Various	June 10, 2015	Digital download; streaming	Dimension Point	
Taiwan	June 19, 2015	CD; DVD	Avex Taiwan	
Hong Kong	June 24, 2015	CD; DVD	Dimension Point	

== See also ==
- List of Oricon number-one albums of 2015
