= Red Carpet (song) =

- Artwork used to physically and digitally commercialize the single

Single by Namie Amuro

from the album Finally
- B-side: "Black Make-Up"
- Released: December 2, 2015
- Recorded: 2015
- Genre: Neo soul; R&B; pop
- Length: 3:43
- Label: Avex Trax; Dimension Point
- Songwriters: Matthew Tishler; Paula Winger; Stephanie Lewis; Tiger
- Producer: Matthew Tishler

Namie Amuro singles chronology
"Revolution" (2015)	"Red Carpet" (2015)	"Mint" (2016)

"Red Carpet" is a song recorded by Japanese singer Namie Amuro. It was released on December 2, 2015 via Avex Trax and her label Dimension Point as the singer's third consecutive non-album single, being supported by B-side track "Black Make-Up". "Red Carpet" was distributed in two physical formats—a standard CD, and a CD and DVD bundle—and was made available for digital consumption. The recording was written and composed by Matthew Tishler, Paula Winger, Stephanie Lewis and Tiger, whilst production was handled by Tishler. Musically, the track features guitars, synthesizers, keyboards and drums as instrumentation. Lyrically, the songwriting focuses on themes of self-confidence, empowerment and narcissism, and uses the title as a metaphor for life experiences.

Upon its release, "Red Carpet" received positive reviews from music critics, with them commending the production and pop-friendly delivery, and also highlighting the inclusion of "Black Make-Up". Commercially, it experienced moderate success in Japan, peaking inside the top five on both the Oricon Singles Chart and Japan Hot 100. An accompanying music video was directed by Hisashi Kikuchi, depicting Amuro through several streets at night, decorated by fairy lights. In order to promote "Red Carpet", it was used for a campaign hosted by Kosee, and was included on the singer's 2016 Livegenic concert tour in Japan and Asia.

== Background and composition ==
On November 3, 2015, Amuro announced the release of a new single titled "Red Carpet" alongside its corresponding music video, and unveiled details about the inclusion of its B-side track, "Black Make-Up". This marked a return to Amuro releasing non-album singles, having previously made available for purchase "Tsuki" (2014) and "Brighter Day" (2014). The singer revealed that the track would premiere as the theme song for Oleo D'or, a commercial campaign created by Japanese cosmetic company Kosee. Additionally, "Black Make-Up" served as the opening theme for Japanese anime series One Piece: Adventures of Nevlandia (2015–16). "Red Carpet" was written and composed by Matthew Tishler, Paula Winger, Stephanie Lewis and Tiger, whilst production was handled by Tishler. The song contains backing vocals by Japanese recording artist Emyli, who previously worked on songs for Amuro in the past.

Musically, "Red Carpet" was described by Japanese journalist Kanako Hayakawa as a neo soul tune with elements of contemporary R&B. Similarly, CD Journal noted elements of neo soul and described its instrumentation as consisting of guitars, pianos and drums. Alex Shenmue, writing for Land of Rising, labelled it a "pop tune". An editor of Billboard Japan noted musical similarities to Amuro's previous singles "Baby Don't Cry" (2007) and "Love Story" (2011), and labelled the sound as an "upbeat neo soul tune". "Black Make-Up" was noted by critics as a "danceable" track that incorporates dance-pop and R&B elements. Lyrically, the songwriting of "Red Carpet" focuses on themes of self-confidence, empowerment and narcissism, with the line "walking on the red carpet" serving as a metaphor for life experiences.

== Release ==
"Red Carpet" was released on December 2, 2015 via Avex Trax and her label Dimension Point as the singer's third consecutive non-album single. It was distributed in two physical formats—a standard CD, and a CD and DVD bundle—and was made available for digital consumption. All three formats include the two tracks and their instrumental versions, whilst the DVD edition came with the single's official music video and behind-the-scenes footage. The cover art for all three formats featured Amuro in front of a large red silk fabric, which resembles the aesthetic of a red carpet, wearing the same dress from the music video. Physical releases of "Red Carpet" included an extra lyric booklet, whilst pre-ordered versions through Japanese retail CDJapan came with a limited edition bonus poster.

== Reception ==
Upon its release, "Red Carpet" received positive reviews from music critics. Alex Shenmue of Land of Rising awarded it seven points out of ten, labelling the sound more "mature" than her previous releases. Despite commending the recording's production, Shemnue did believe that the material was neither "breaking any boundary or reaching outstanding levels". Similarly, a member from CD Journal complimented the composition and its commercial appeal, additionally highlighting the production of B-side track "Black Make-Up". An editor from Billboard Japan was positive towards the production and composition of "Red Carpet", and complimented the lyrical content for its "hero"-esque vibe.

Commercially, "Red Carpet" experienced moderate success in Japan. It entered the daily Oricon Singles Chart at number two, staying there for three consecutive days. Subsequently, it opened at number two on Oricon's weekly chart, accumulating sales of 25,866 copies and making it the singers lowest first-week sales since "Big Boys Cry/Beautiful" (2013). However, it also became her highest-charting release behind her triple A-side release "Naked/Fight Together/Tempest". It dropped to number 18 the following week, selling an additional 4,962 units in its final week inside the top 40. It spent nine weeks inside the top 200, and sold 30,828 units by the end of 2015; as of October 2016, "Red Carpet" has sold over 35,521 physical copies in Japan. The single opened at number five on the Japan Hot 100, at number three on the Hot Singles Sales and at number nine on the Radio Songs chart, all hosted by Billboard Japan. Additionally, "Black Make-Up" peaked at number 96 on the Japan Hot 100 chart.

== Promotion ==
An accompanying music video for "Red Carpet" was directed by Hisashi Kikuchi, and was uploaded onto the singer's YouTube channel on November 19, 2015. It opens with Amuro walking through two large doors, wearing a coat-like dress; on the DVD editions of the single, a special customization function allows the viewer to change the colour of the dress. She strolls through several streets and sits down briefly on a small bench-seat, with several members of the public, including a young couple and small children. The second chorus has her gazing through a fashion boutique, admiring several pairs of heels. By the bridge section, sparks fall from the sky and are seen behind Amuro as she looks upwards. Whilst the final chorus has her dancing as the sparks fall, the visual ends with the singer walking up several steps and posing for the camera.

In order to promote the single, it was used for Japanese commercials and live tours conducted by Amuro. As aforementioned, "Red Carpet" was used as the commercial track for Kosee's Oleo D'or campaign, whilst "Black Make-Up" was used as the opening theme to Japanese anime series One Piece: Adventures of Nevlandia (2015–16). Additionally, the singer included "Red Carpet" and "Black Make-Up" on the setlist for her 2016 Livegenic concert tour in Japan and Asia.

== Track listing and formats ==
CD/digital download
No.	Title	Lyrics	Music	Producer	Length
1.	"Red Carpet"	Matthew Tishler; Paula Winger; Stephanie Lewis; Tiger	Tishler; Winger; Lewis	Tishler	3:43
2.	"Black Make-Up"	Andreas Öberg; Sigurd Rosnes; XIN_G; Tiger	Öberg; Rosnes; XIN_G	Rosnes	3:10
3.	"Red Carpet" (Instrumental)		Tishler; Winger; Lewis	Tishler	3:42
4.	"Black Make-Up" (Instrumental)		Öberg; Rosnes; XIN_G	Rosnes	3:08

DVD
No.	Title	Director	Length
1.	"Red Carpet"	Hisashi Kikuchi	3:50
2.	"Red Carpet" (Making Movie)	Hirohito Fujiyasu

== Credits and personnel ==
Credits adapted from the liner notes of the single's CD and DVD release.

Recording and management

- Recorded by Wataru Namifura at LAB Recordings, Japan in 2015; mixed and mastered by D.O.I. and Tom Coyne at Sterling Studios, New York City, New York. Management by Stella88 and Avex Trax.

Credits

- Namie Amuro – vocals
- Matthew Tishler – producer, composer, arrangement, songwriter, vocal arrangement/production, instrumentation
- Paula Winger – composer, arrangement, songwriter
- Stephanie Lewis – composer, arrangement, songwriter
- Tiger – songwriter
- Yuko Yasumoto – production co-ordinator
- Andreas Öberg – composer, arrangement, songwriter, electric guitars
- Sigurd Rosnes – producer, composer, arrangement, songwriter
- Xing – composer, songwriter
- Emyli – background vocals, vocal production/direction
- Wataru Namifusa – recording
- D.O.I. – mixing
- Hisashi Kikuchi – music video director
- Hirohito Fujiyasu – music video director, video producer
- Takuro Iwagami – cinematographer
- Takayuki Yaginuma – cinematographer
- Eikuu Tamada – cinematographer
- Shogen Yamamoto – light direction
- Satomi Kurihara – hair and make-up artist
- Akira Noda – stylist
- Kohei Takeda – video producer
- Toshiyuki Suzuki – art director
- Jun Hirota – art director
- Aiko Hayashi – designer
- Tisch – photographer

== Charts and sales ==
=== Charts ===
Chart (2015–2016)	Peak position
Japan Daily Chart (Oricon)	2
Japan Weekly Chart (Oricon)	2
Japan Hot 100 (Billboard)	5
Japan Top Single Sales (Billboard)	3
Japan Top Radio Songs (Billboard)	9

=== Sales ===
Region	Certification	Certified units/sales
Japan	—	36,319

== Release history ==
Region	Date	Format	Label
Japan	December 2, 2015	CD; DVD; digital download	Avex Trax; Dimension Point
United States	December 2, 2015	Digital download	Avex Music Creative Inc.
Australia	December 2, 2015	Digital download	Avex Music Creative Inc.
New Zealand	December 2, 2015	Digital download	Avex Music Creative Inc.
Canada	December 2, 2015	Digital download	Avex Music Creative Inc.
United Kingdom	December 2, 2015	Digital download	Avex Music Creative Inc.
Germany	December 2, 2015	Digital download	Avex Music Creative Inc.
Ireland	December 2, 2015	Digital download	Avex Music Creative Inc.
France	December 2, 2015	Digital download	Avex Music Creative Inc.
Spain	December 2, 2015	Digital download	Avex Music Creative Inc.
Taiwan	December 2, 2015	Digital download	Avex Music Creative Inc.
