= Emyli =

Emyli エミリ
- Born: Emyli; April 23, 1988 (age 38); Tokyo, Japan
- Genres: Pop
- Occupation: Singer Songwriter
- Years active: 2003-present
- Labels: BMG JAPAN (2003-2006), Seventh Code (2006-2009)
- Website: http://www.emylimusic.com

Emyli (エミリ, Emiri; born April 23, 1988) is a Japanese, bilingual singer-songwriter based in Tokyo.

== Biography ==
Emyli debuted at the age of 15 from BMG Japan with her first single, "Rain." Since the release of her first album "Flower of Life," she has performed and toured with popular acts such as M-Flo and Shinhwa. Upon graduating Sophia University, she has been writing songs for J-Pop as well as K-Pop artists such as Namie Amuro, E-Girls, May J., SOL (BIG BANG), etc.

== Discography ==
=== Studio albums ===
- Flower of Life (2003)

=== Singles ===
- Rain (2003)
- Someday (2003)
- Voice of Love (2003)
- The Other Side of Love (m-flo feat. Sister E) (2003)
- DOPAMINE (m-flo loves EMYLI & Diggy-Mo') (2005)
- Loop in My Heart (m-flo loves EMYLI & Yoshika) (2005)
- Come Home (2005)
- Don't Vanish Love (2006)
- HIGHWAY STAR - Featuring Vocal Emyli - (Shinhwa feat. Emyli) (2006)
- Day by Day (2007)
- Tekitō Lover (Emyli feat. VERBAL) (2007)
- love comes and goes (m-flo loves Emi Hinouchi & Ryohei & Emyli & Yoshika & LISA) (2008)
- Take Me Away (2010)
- Your #1 (MAKAI feat. Emyli & WISE) (2010)
- I Belong 2 U (MAKAI feat. Emi Hinouchi & Emyli & Hiromi) (2010)
- Wanna Dance (2010)
- Champion (TCY FORCE feat. Emyli) (2010)
- come on & Let's go (BACK-ON feat. Emyli, kailis from OVERDOSE (2012)

=== Songwriting work ===
2010

- CHOCOLAT / TCY FORCE feat. Mariya Ise
- Champion / TCY FORCE feat. Emyli

2011

- Merry-Go-Round / MAKAI feat. AISHA
- Roller Coaster / MAKAI feat. JONTE
- SCANDALOUS / Maki Goto
- Do It! Do It! / KARA

2012

- RAINBOW / May J.
- Say "Ah!" / May J.
- Kimi Ga Irukara〜Kokoro No Tonari De～ / BRIGHT
- Hello / RAINBOW
- Kiss! Kiss! Disco! / RAINBOW
- Energy / RAINBOW
- Touch Me, Feel Me, Love Me / RAINBOW
- CANDY GIRLS! / RAINBOW
- SPEED UP / KARA
- No Goodbyes / 2PM+2AM'OneDay'
- Lost feat. Jinwoon from 2AM / Nicole of KARA
- ELECTRIC BOY / KARA
- Rewind / May J.

2013

- JUST IN LOVE / E-Girls
- Hey Pretty Girl / 2AM
- First Love / 2AM
- Oh / Chansung of 2PM
- BOOM! BOOM! / Dream (Japanese band)
- Take it easy! / E-girls
- Boom! Boom!/ Dream
- Waterfalls (20th Anniversary Version) / Namie Amuro
- Heaven / Namie Amuro
- Like a star / ジュノ (2PM)
- 目を閉じて / ジュノ (2PM)
- Heartbreaker / ジュノ (2PM)
- I love you / ジュノ (2PM)
- Winter Love〜愛の贈り物〜 / E-Girls

2014

- Wanna Wanna Go! / Dream (歌手グループ)
- So Wonderful / ニックン (2PM)
- Give Up / ウヨン (2PM)
- EYES, NOSE, LIPS (日本語バージョン) / Taeyang from Big Bang (South Korean band)

2015

- Still Lovin' You / Namie Amuro
- Photogenic / Namie Amuro
- Birthday / Namie Amuro
- Fashionista / Namie Amuro
- Want U Bag / Melody Day

2016

- Mint / Namie Amuro
- I'M YOUNG / Taehyun (WINNER)
- Sekaiichi / A.B.C-Z
- Neon Twilight / FEMM
- Kaketa Tsuki / Shion Miyawaki
- D. Island / Doberman Infinity
- Fighter / Namie Amuro
- Christmas Wish / Namie Amuro

2017

- Just You And I / Namie Amuro
- Never Ever / Beverly

2019

- Sappy / Red Velvet

2023

- F.A.F.O / @onefive

2025

- SEQUENCE 01 / f5ve
