= Verbal discography =

- Studio albums: 1
- Singles: 2
- Music videos: 1

The discography of Verbal consists of 1 studio album released under Rhythm Zone, plus many featured singles and album tracks. Verbal is occasionally credited as L Universe (when working as a part of Hydeout Production), L12 (a collaboration unit with Daisuke Imai), Toss&Turn (a collaboration unit with Giorgio Cancemi) and The Funky President (when collaborating with Mic Banditz).

== Studio albums ==
| Title | Album details | Peak chart positions (JPN) | Sales |
|---|---|---|---|
| Visionair | Released: March 16, 2011; Label: Rhythm Zone (RZCD-46858); Formats: CD, digital download | 35 | 6,100 |

== Singles ==
=== As a lead artist ===
| Title | Year | Peak chart positions | Album |
| Title | Year | Billboard Japan Hot 100 | Album |
|---|---|---|---|
| "Lose My Religion" (L Universe) | 2000 | — | — |
| "Asteroid Love" (L Universe) | 2003 | — | — |
| "Fall Out" (featuring Shunya) | 2010 | — | Visionair |
| "Change Change" (featuring Nicki Minaj) | 2011 | — | Visionair |
| "Black Out" (featuring Lil Wayne, Namie Amuro) | 2011 | — | Visionair |
| "We Are One" (with Kylie Minogue) | 2011 | — | |
"—" denotes releases that did not chart or were not released in that region.

=== As a featured artist ===
| Title | Year | Peak chart positions | | Sales | Certifications | Album |
| Title | Year | Oricon Singles Charts | Billboard Japan Hot 100* | Sales | Certifications | Album |
|---|---|---|---|---|---|---|
| "T.O.P." (S.E.S. featuring Verbal) | 1999 | 56 | — | 4,800 | | Prime: S.E.S. the Best |
| "The Love Hole" (K. featuring Verbal) | 2000 | — | — | — | | Kaleidolife |
| "Ex-Boyfriend" (Crystal Kay featuring Verbal) | 2001 | 44 | — | 21,000 | | 637: Always and Forever |
| "Give It a Try" (Daisuke Imai featuring Verbal) | 2001 | — | — | — | | Color Me You |
| "Lovin' It" (Namie Amuro & Verbal) | 2001 | 8 | — | 72,000 | | Song Nation |
| "So Tell Me" (Heartsdales) | 2001 | 8 | — | 134,000 | RIAJ physical: gold | Radioactive |
| "Get Out!" (DJ Hasebe featuring Bonnie Pink & Verbal) | 2002 | 49 | — | 8,800 | | Tail of Old Nick |
| "That's Why" (Heartsdales) | 2002 | 29 | — | 16,000 | | Radioactive |
| "Off the Chains" (Toss&Turn) | 2002 | — | — | — | | — |
| "Body Rock" (Heartsdales) | 2002 | 33 | — | 21,000 | | Sugar Shine |
| "Tha Superstar" (Michico featuring Verbal) | 2002 | — | — | — | | I Do |
| "Baby Be Mine" (Suite Chic featuring Verbal) | 2002 | 35 | — | 26,000 | | When Pop Hits the Fan |
| "Throw Ur Drinks Up!!!" (DJ Hasebe featuring Verbal, Sphere of Influence, Boy-Ken & Mr. Cheeks) | 2003 | 159 | — | 800 | | — |
| "Onelove" (Ryohei featuring Verbal) | 2006 | 47 | — | 5,000 | | ReListen |
| "Here We Go" (May J. featuring Verbal) | 2006 | 70 | — | 3,900 | | Baby Girl |
| "Summertime" (Double featuring Verbal) | 2007 | 27 | — | 6,500 | | Reflex |
| "Tekitō Lover" (テキトーLOVER; "Suitable Lover") (Emyli featuring Verbal) | 2007 | 199 | — | 400 | | — |
| "The Galaxy Express 999" (Exile featuring Verbal) | 2008 | — | 7 | — | RIAJ ringtone: million; RIAJ full-length cellphone: double platinum; RIAJ PC downloads: platinumm | Exile Catchy Best |
| "S.O.S. (Same Old Song)" (Kat to Verbal) | 2008 | — | 44 | — | | Echoes Over the Ocean |
| "Majestic Trancer" (Doping Panda featuring Verbal) | 2008 | 24 | 90 | 7,000 | | Decadence |
| "Universe" (BoA featuring Crystal Kay & Verbal) | 2009 | 8 | — | 22,000 | | Best & USA |
| "Kimi no Koe o" (君の声を; "Your Voice") (Kana Nishino featuring Verbal) | 2009 | — | 55 | — | RIAJ full-length cellphone: platinum | Love One. |
| "Bump Bump!" (BoA featuring Verbal) | 2009 | 8 | 6 | 14,000 | | Identity |
| "Pa to Hanasaku" (パッと花咲く; "Blooming with a Bang") (Minmi featuring Verbal) | 2010 | 58 | 70 | 2,000 | | Minmi Best: Ame nochi Niji 2002—2012 |
| "Memories Again" (Aili featuring Verbal) | 2010 | — | 31 | — | | Future |
*Japan Hot 100 established February 2008.

== Other appearances ==
All songs feature Verbal's vocals, as well as his songwriting. Songs performed as a part of M-Flo, Teriyaki Boyz and MC Banditz are not featured in the list.

=== 1999–2003 ===
| Year | Song | Album |
|---|---|---|
| 1999 | "Ain't No Mystery" (Nujabes & L Universe) | — |
| 2000 | "You Were Right" (Coldfeet feat. Verbal) | Lucid Dream |
| 2000 | "Lyrical Terrorists" (Substantial & L Universe) | — |
| 2001 | "DYAD (The Chronicle)" (DJ Tonk featuring Rocket Science (Verbal & Sphere)) | Aquarian Soul |
| 2001 | "Beach Star High" (Ajapai vs. Verbal) | Cheers! |
| 2001 | "From Here" (Daisuke Imai featuring Verbal) | Color Me You |
| 2001 | "Watch Out!" (Heartsdales) | "So Tell Me" (single) |
| 2002 | "Did It Again?" (Momoe Shimano featuring Verbal) | Girls Voice Studio 11 |
| 2002 | "Wild" (Heartsdales featuring Verbal) | Radioactive |
| 2002 | "Ow!" (Heartsdales featuring Verbal) | Radioactive |
| 2002 | "Girl Don't Cry" (Heartsdales featuring Crazy-A, Verbal) | Radioactive |
| 2002 | "Baby Shine" (Heartsdales featuring Ai, Verbal) | Radioactive |
| 2002 | "Fly!" (Heartsdales featuring Ai, Verbal) | Radioactive |
| 2002 | "Till Morning Comes" (Kumi Koda featuring Verbal) | Affection |
| 2002 | "Helpless Rain (But I'm Fallin' Too Deep)" (Mika Nakashima featuring Heartsdales, Verbal) | "Helpless Rain" (single) |
| 2002 | "Good Time (1989)" (Toss&Turn featuring Shiori) | "Off the Chains" (single) |
| 2002 | "Kimochi wa Tsutawaru (L12 Remix)" (気持ちはつたわる; "The Feelings Transmit") (BoA featuring Rude Boy Face) | Peace B. Remixes |
| 2002 | "Maze (L12 Remix)"(Kumi Koda) | "Maze" (single) |
| 2002 | "We Done Did It" (Sphere of Influence featuring Verbal) | The Influence |
| 2002 | "Suicide Scandinavia" (Matally vs. Verbal) | Matally |
| 2002 | "Messing with My Head" (Pase Rock & L Universe) | — |
| 2003 | "Spectacular" (Fantastic Plastic Machine featuring Verbal) | Too |
| 2003 | "What If" (Suite Chic featuring Verbal) | When Pop Hits the Fan |
| 2003 | "Nuts" (51-Goichi- featuring Sphere of Influence & Verbal) | 51st Dimension: The Ying |
| 2003 | "Street Code" (Brier & El Nando featuring Verbal) | Cross Counter |
| 2003 | "Spectacular" (Fantastic Plastic Machine featuring Verbal) | Too |
| 2003 | "Block Shot Hustlaz" (Heartsdales featuring Fūrinkazan) | Sugar Shine |
| 2003 | "Look Around" (Bratz featuring Christina Milian and Verbal) | — |
| 2003 | "Dreams of Christmas" (Keiko feat. Verbal) | "KCO" (single) |
| 2003 | "Fish" (Namie Amuro featuring Verbal and Arkitec) | Style |

=== 2004–2009 ===
| Year | Song | Album |
|---|---|---|
| 2004 | "Some Day One Day" (BoA featuring Verbal) | Love & Honesty |
| 2004 | "Let's Go (It's a Movement) (Deckstream Remix)" (Lil'Ai featuring Warren G, KRS-One, Verbal) | Let's Go (It's a Movement) |
| 2004 | "Can't Stop Lovin' You" (Black Bottom Brass Band featuring Verbal, Emi Hinouchi) | Wasshoi Star |
| 2005 | "Tsubazeriai" (鍔ゼリアイ; "Close Competitors") (Gagle featuring Verbal) | Big Bang Theory |
| 2006 | "Sunshine" (Yoshika featuring Verbal) | Timeless |
| 2006 | "Hyōriittai" (表裏一体; "Moebius Strip") (L-Vokal featuring Verbal, Jamosa) | Laughin' |
| 2006 | "Shingō Mushi" (信号無視; "Read Light Runner") (Sonomi featuring Chiharu, Cuezero, Kreva, Aesthetics, Goro Kumai & Verbal) | Kravel Compi No. 3 Sonomi |
| 2006 | "U Know Y" (Twigy) | Twig |
| 2006 | "Funny Money Girl" (Ajapai featuring Verbal) | Unaffected |
| 2006 | "Love Mode" (Clazziquai Project featuring Verbal) | Love Mode |
| 2006 | "Love Mode" (Clazziquai Project featuring PE'Z, Verbal) | Love Mode |
| 2006 | "Party People" (パーリーピーポー, Pārī Pīpō) (Rip Slyme hosted by Verbal) | Epoch |
| 2006 | "Bakayarow" (バカヤROW; "Idiot") (KM-Markit featuring Verbal) | Mark Out |
| 2007 | "Tokyo Shit" (東京シット, Tōkyō Shitto) (L-Vokal & Doc Dee featuring Sphere of Influence, Verbal) | Matenrō |
| 2007 | "Wave Rave" (Jazztronik featuring Verbal) | Grand Blue |
| 2007 | "Turn It Up" (Dohzi-T featuring Thelma Aoyama, Little, Verbal, Kohei Japan) | One Mic |
| 2007 | "Can You Let Me Know" (DJ Deckstream featuring Lupe Fiasco, Verbal and Sarah Green) | Deckstream Sound Tracks |
| 2007 | "Time" (Kan Takagi featuring Ane Bose (Scha Dara Parr), Verbal and Lupe Fiasco) | — |
| 2008 | "Play da Song" (DJ Sancon featuring Full of Harmony, Verbal) | Harlem Ver. X: Harlem 10th Anniversary Special |
| 2008 | "Otoko no Komoriuta" (男の子守唄; "Lullaby for Boys") (Riki vs. Verbal) | Zenkoku Seiha |
| 2008 | "ENERGY" (Full of Harmony featuring Verbal) | Energy |
| 2008 | "Dancehall Jungle" (Verbal & Miss Monday) | Tokyo Ragga Blaze 2 |
| 2008 | "Golden Ballers" (Afra and Incredible Beatbox Band featuring Verbal, Nipps) | World Class |
| 2008 | "Super Shine" (Exile featuring Verbal) | "The Birthday (Ti Amo)" (single) |
| 2008 | "Load the Disc" (SBK featuring Verbal) | Returns |
| 2008 | "Can't Believe It (Lost in Shibuya Remix)" (T-Pain featuring Verbal) | Three Ringz (Japanese Edition) |
| 2008 | "Saturdays" (Dexpistols featuring Mademoiselle Yulia & Verbal) | Roc Trax Presents Lesson 05 Saturdays |
| 2008 | "Kagayaki o Mō Ichido" (輝きをもう一度; "Shine Once Again") (Infinity 16 welcomez Verbal, Munehiro) | Welcomez |

=== 2009–present ===
| Year | Song | Album |
|---|---|---|
| 2009 | "YOR" (Towa Tei featuring Mademoiselle Yulia & Verbal) | Big Fun |
| 2009 | "Screwtape" (DJ Deckstream featuring L Universe) | Deckstream Soundtracks 2 |
| 2009 | "What Now?" (Mademoidelle Yulia & Verbal) | M-Flo Inside: Works Best III |
| 2009 | "VIPP (Very Important Party People)" (Ravex featuring TRF, Verbal) | Trax |
| 2009 | "Wanna Come Again" (Thelma Aoyama featuring Verbal) | Emotions |
| 2009 | "Big Money Comin'" (Crookers featuring Verbal) | Put Your Hands on Me |
| 2009 | "Izm" (BoA featuring Verbal) | "Bump Bump!" (single) |
| 2009 | "Falling for You..." (Lisa featuring Verbal) | Disco Volante |
| 2010 | "ID" (Iconiq featuring Verbal) | Change Myself |
| 2010 | "Just Love It" (L-Vokal featuring Verbal, Kreva) | Lovin' |
| 2010 | "Beat Surf" (Dragon Ash featuring Pe'z, Verbal) | Mixture |
| 2010 | "This Ain't a Love Song" (Emilia de Poreto featuring Verbal) | — |
| 2010 | "Baby I See You" (Miliyah Kato featuring Verbal) | Heaven |
| 2010 | "Cherry Bomb" (Verbal & Yoon) | 50 Years of Dr. Martens |
| 2010 | "Tell Me (Ryohei Remix)" (FPM featuring Verbal) | FPM Boot |
| 2010 | "Never" (Sowelu featuring Verbal) | Love & I: Ren'ai Henreki |
| 2011 | "Years Later" (Tetsuya Komuro featuring Verbal) | Digitalian Is Eating Breakfast 2 |
| 2011 | "Wao" (Mademoiselle Yulia featuring Verbal) | Mademoworld |
| 2011 | "Ray of Life" (Marie Ishikawa featuring Verbal) | — |
| 2012 | "Change My Mind" (Exile Atsushi featuring Verbal) | Solo |
| 2012 | "20112012" (Hyadain featuring Verbal) | 20112012 |
| 2012 | "Touch the Sky" (Matt Cab featuring Verbal) | Love Stories |
| 2012 | "Koi Romantic!!" (恋ロマンティック!!; "Love Romantic!!") (Rocketman featuring Verbal) | Koi Romantic!! |
| 2012 | "Girl Fight" (Lucas Valentine featuring Verbal & Yurisa) | — |
| 2013 | "Kon'ya wa Boogie Back" (今夜はブギーバック; "Boogie Back Tonight") (D-Lite featuring Verbal) | D'scover |

== Songwriting credits ==
This list features songs where Verbal has only contributed lyrics, music or production, as opposed to songs which feature him as a vocalist as well.

| Year | Song | Participation | Album |
|---|---|---|---|
| 2000 | "Never Say..." (K.) | Lyrics | Kaleidolife |
| 2001 | "After the Silence" (K.) | Lyrics | Keynote |
| 2001 | "ESP" (Heartsdales) | Lyrics, music | Radioactive |
| 2002 | "Lights Out (Intro)" (Heartsdales) | Lyrics, music | Radioactive |
| 2002 | "The Question Remains (Interlude)" (Heartsdales) | Lyrics, music | Radioactive |
| 2002 | "Dangerous (Interlude)" (Heartsdales) | Lyrics, music | Radioactive |
| 2002 | "Radioactive" (Heartsdales) | Lyrics, music | Radioactive |
| 2002 | "All Mine" (Heartsdales) | Lyrics, music | Radioactive |
| 2002 | "Rainy Days" (Heartsdales) | Music | Sugar Shine |
| 2002 | "Right Now" (Heartsdales) | Music | Sugar Shine |
| 2003 | "We Got Time" (Suite Chic) | Lyrics | When Pop Hits the Fan |
| 2003 | "Candy Pop" (Heartsdales featuring Soul'd Out) | Lyrics, music | Sugar Shine |
| 2003 | "Oh Girl" (Heartsdales featuring Ryohei Yamamoto) | Music | Sugar Shine |
| 2003 | "Ooh Wah!" (Heartsdales) | Music | Sugar Shine |
| 2004 | "Baby Blue!" (Halcali) | Lyrics, music, producer | Ongaku no Susume |
| 2007 | "It Is What It Is (Remix)" (Verbal/L-Vokal) | Remixer | Matenrō: Natsu Basho |
| 2007 | "Koi no Bububun" (恋のブブブン; "The Vroom Vroom Vroom of Love") (Halcali) | Lyrics, music, producer | Cyborg Oretachi |
| 2009 | "Rock U" (Ravex featuring Namie Amuro) | Lyrics | Trax |
| 2010 | "Lazer" (BoA) | Lyrics, music | Identity |
| 2010 | "Yes" (Halcali) | Lyrics, music, producer | Tokyo Groove |
| 2011 | "Naked" (Namie Amuro) | Lyrics | Uncontrolled |
| 2011 | "Gimme Gimme" (Mademoiselle Yulia) | Lyrics, music | Mademoworld |
| 2011 | "Bam Me" (Mademoiselle Yulia) | Lyrics, music | Mademoworld |
| 2011 | "Down Down" (Mademoiselle Yulia) | Lyrics, music | Mademoworld |
| 2011 | "Zodiac Gold" (Mademoiselle Yulia) | Lyrics, music | Mademoworld |
| 2011 | "Replay" (Mademoiselle Yulia) | Lyrics, music | Mademoworld |
| 2011 | "You Can't Have Me That Way" (Mademoiselle Yulia) | Lyrics, music | Mademoworld |
| 2011 | "Midnight Express" (Mademoiselle Yulia) | Lyrics, music | Mademoworld |
| 2011 | "Don't Stop the Music" (Mademoiselle Yulia) | Lyrics | Mademoworld |
| 2011 | "Tough Me" (Mademoiselle Yulia) | Lyrics, music | Mademoworld |
| 2011 | "My Eye Ah" (Be-ppin) | Lyrics | Shinichi Osawa's Works 2008-2012 |
| 2012 | "Fantastic Baby" (Big Bang) | Japanese Lyrics | Alive |
| 2012 | "Scream" (2NE1) | Japanese Lyrics | Collection |
| 2012 | "Anna Yatsu" (あんなヤツ; "Those Guys") (G-Dragon) | Japanese Lyrics | Special Final in Dome Memorial Collection |
| 2013 | "Pitakage" (ピタカゲ; "Crooked") (G-Dragon) | Japanese Lyrics | Coup D'Etat[+ One Of A Kind & Heartbreaker] |
