= Double discography =

This article includes the discography for the singer Double.

== Albums ==
=== Studio ===
Title	Album details	Peak chart positions	Sales	Certifications
Crystal	Released: June 2, 1999; Formats: CD, cassette, digital download	2	636,440+	2× Platinum
Double	Released: October 29, 2000; Formats: CD, LP, digital download	13	136,760+	Gold
Vision	Released: October 29, 2002; Formats: CD, LP, digital download	3	229,713+	Gold
Wonderful	Released: November 19, 2003; Formats: CD, digital download	4	165,685+	Gold
Life Is Beautiful	Released: November 24, 2004; Formats: CD, LP, digital download	14	60,021+	
Reflex	Released: August 8, 2007; Formats: CD, CD+DVD, LP, digital download	7	45,382+	
Woman	Released: October 5, 2011; Formats: CD, digital download	26	8,000+	

=== Remix ===
Title	Album details	Peak chart positions	Sales	Certifications
Crystal Planet	Released: December 1, 1999; Formats: CD, digital download	5	142,000+	Gold
GEE (GTS) presents Double Greatest Remix	Released: April 24, 2002; Formats: CD, LP, digital download	47	17,750+	
Re:Vision	Released: November 20, 2004; Formats: CD, digital download	40	28,902+	
Too Wonderful	Released: January 28, 2004; Formats: CD, digital download	23	27,001+	
Reflex Remix	Released: September 12, 2007; Formats: CD, LP, digital download	93	3,880+	

=== Compilation ===
Title	Album details	Peak chart positions	Sales	Certifications
10 Years Best We R&B	Released: February 6, 2008; Formats: CD, digital download	2	105,537+	Gold
The Best Collaborations	Released: May 28, 2008; Formats: CD, digital download	2	153,086+	Gold
Ballad Collection Mellow	Released: May 14, 2010; Formats: CD, digital download	14	17,941+	

=== Other ===
Title	Album details	Peak chart positions	Sales	Certifications
double Eng Ver.	Released: April 24, 2001; Formats: CD, LP, digital download	30	22,660	
Virgin Mix	Released: April 7, 2007; Formats: CD, digital download	13	41,562+	
Second Virgin Mix	Released: July 22, 2009; Formats: CD, digital download	24	18,469+	

== Singles ==
Title	Year	Oricon Singles Charts	Sales	Album
"For Me"	1998	89	2,990	Crystal
"Desire"	1998	—		Crystal
"Bed"	1998	89	4,420	Crystal
"Shake"	1999	21	101,300	Crystal
"Handle" (featuring F.O.H.)	2000	18	73,760	Double
"U"	2000	21	66,290	Double
"Angel"	2000	38	14,670	Double
"Driving All Night"	2002	6		Vision
"You Got To"	2002	6	85,650	Vision
"Who's That Girl"	2002	9	46,100	Vision
"Rollin' On"	2003	14	49,080	Wonderful
"Destiny"	2003	10	36,924	Wonderful
"Rock the Party"	2005	15	27,324	Reflex
"Call Me"	2006	25	12,760	Reflex
"Spring Love"	2007	20	9,802	Reflex
"Summertime" (featuring Verbal)	2007	27	6,563	Reflex
"Nokoribi (Eternal Bed)"	2007	60	3,773	Ballad Collection Mellow
"Let It Go"	2009	46	2,898	Ballad Collection Mellow
"Oyasumi no Kiss wo (Good Night My Love)"	2009	19	14,480	Ballad Collection Mellow
"Lips"	2011	—		Non-album single
"Circle of Life"	2015	—		Non-album single
"Upload" (with Silva and SugarSoul)	2018	—		Non-album single

== Video albums ==
Title	Album details	Peak chart positions	Sales	Certifications
Double	Released: April 25, 2001; Formats: DVD	—		
The Best Vision of Double	Released: April 9, 2003; Formats: DVD	6	15,103+	
Double Best Live We R&B Tour Final @ Studio Coast	Released: November 26, 2008; Formats: DVD	12	17,470+	
