= Checkmate! (album) =

- CD only edition cover

Compilation album by Namie Amuro
- Released: April 27, 2011
- Recorded: 2003–2011
- Genre: Pop; dance; R&B
- Length: 58:04
- Language: Japanese; English
- Label: Avex Trax
- Producer: Takashi Kasuga (exec.); Shinji Hayashi (exec.); Shintaro Higuchi; Hisahiko Iida; Rui Maeda

Namie Amuro chronology
Past<Future (2009)	Checkmate! (2011)	Uncontrolled (2012)

Singles from Checkmate!
- 1. "Wonder Woman" Released: March 9, 2011; 2. "Make It Happen" Released: April 20, 2011; 3. "#1" Released: April 27, 2011; 4. "Unusual" Released: May 4, 2011

Checkmate! is a collaboration album by Japanese singer Namie Amuro, featuring a collection of her collaborations with other musicians released between 2003 and 2011, as well as four new collaborations. The album was released on April 27, 2011, about one month after its original release date, due to 2011 Tōhoku earthquake and tsunami.

Two songs were released as digital downloads prior to the album, "Wonder Woman" in early March prior to the album's postponement, as well as "Make It Happen" on April 20, a week before the album's release.

== Background and development ==
The album was first conceived after Amuro had finished her tour for her 2009 album Past<Future. Many of the collaborators on the album worked on multiple tracks. Amuro collaborated with Verbal on five songs: "Wet'N Wild" (producer), "Black Out", "Luvotomy" (rapper, songwriter), "Rock U" (lyricist) and on the hidden track, which is a remix of Amuro's single "Want Me, Want Me" (2005) with additional rapping by Verbal. Ai collaborated with Amuro "Do What U Gotta Do," "Fake" and one of the new songs, "Wonder Woman." Two songs are from Zeebra albums, "After Party" (2003) and "Do What U Gotta Do" (2006). Taku Takahashi contributed on "Luvotomy" (trackmaker) and "Rock U" (co-trackmaker). Double, other than the duet "Black Diamond," wrote the Japanese lyrics to "Make It Happen."

For "Wonder Woman," Amuro asked Ai and Tsuchiya to collaborate with her, as she wanted to create a strong song with a chorus of female vocalists. Amuro felt that she had worked with Ai so many times in the past that a collaboration with her could not go wrong. "Make It Happen" is South Korean group After School's first Japanese release. Amuro stated that she had taken notice of the K-pop scene for some time. For the project, Amuro's staff gave her a list of possible Korean collaborators. Due to her enjoying After School member Uee's performance in the Korean drama You're Beautiful, she decided on the group. The song was written by Swedish and North American writers Jörgen Elofsson, Erik Lidbom and Bonnie McKee, and was originally titled "Shallow."

The collaboration with Kaname Kawabata of the R&B vocal duo Chemistry started when the two became friends after being introduced through a mutual friend. For the album, Amuro wanted to create a dance/song music video with a male artist. While appearing on a music show in Summer 2010 to promote her single "Break It/Get Myself Back," Johnny & Associates idol Tomohisa Yamashita was featured on the same program, and Amuro was impressed with his performance of "One in a Million," which inspired the idea for the collaboration.

== Promotion and release ==
"Rock U" was used in television commercials for the Activision game Call of Duty: Black Ops from November 2010 onwards, seven and a half months after its release. The song was also one of two songs broadcast exclusively on MTV Japan to promote Amuro's DVD Namie Amuro Past<Future Tour 2010, and was broadcast solely on January 11 and 12, 2011.

Two nationwide commercial campaigns featured Amuro at the time of release. "Wonder Woman" was used in the Coca-Cola Zero Wild Race commercial campaign in Japan, the fourth set of commercials to feature Amuro as the spokesperson for the brand, with commercials first airing on February 13. During album promotions, Amuro was also featured as the first spokesperson for cosmetic firm Kosé's Esprique range. The commercials began airing in late March, and featured "Naked," a song on her first single to be released after the album. "Make It Happen" was used as background music for two commercials: one for Sharp's au 1S05 cellphone, and another for Recochoku.

Three of the four new songs on album were released as ringtones prior to the album's release: "Wonder Woman" on February 16, "Make It Happen" on February 23 and "Unusual" on March 9. Amuro was featured in several fashion magazines during album promotions, including Gisele, Ray, S Cawaii, Sweet and Vivi. On June 25, 2011, Amuro attended the 2011 MTV Video Music Aid Japan award ceremony, performing "Wonder Woman" with Ai and Anna Tsuchiya. This was the first performance of the song, as well as the first performance of any of the new songs from the album.

=== Promotional singles ===
"Black Diamond" (2008)
Amuro's collaboration with Double was extremely successful digitally, being certified by the RIAJ as a double platinum ringtone and as a gold cellphone download in 2008.

"Wonder Woman" featuring singer/rapper Ai and rock musician Anna Tsuchiya was the first song released in promotion of the album, released as full-length a cellphone download on March 9. The song had earlier debuted on radio, during J-Wave's Groove Line Z program on February 17. Before the album's release, the song has received mid-level radio play, allowing it to reach number 47 on Billboard's Japan Hot 100 chart. During the week of the album's release, however, increased airplay as well as downloads on iTunes Japan made the song peak at number five.

The song received a larger response on adult alternative radio stations in Japan, as shown by the song reaching number 2 on Billboard's Adult Contemporary Airplay chart, when in the same time period only reaching number 5 on the general airplay chart. The song debuted at number 5 on the Recording Industry Association of Japan's cellphone download chart in the special two-week postponed chart that was released due to the Tōhoku earthquake and tsunami. All three musicians billed in the song appeared on the cover of fashion magazine S Cawaii's April issue, in promotion of the single. "Make It Happen" was released digitally to cellphones on April 20, a week before the album's release. On RIAJ's digital track chart, the song debuted at number ten. "#1" received a digital release simultaneous with the album's release date, however, "Unusual" was released a week after the album, on May 4.

=== Music videos ===
Four MVs for the new songs were filmed, which were released to music video channels in February and March. On MTV Japan, an hour's length episode of MTV A Class was dedicated to these, which was first aired on March 19. "Wonder Woman" was the first video to be released, and was debuted on Space Shower on February 18. "Make It Happen" was debuted on online streaming service GyaO! on February 17, and was debuted on TV on MTV Japan on February 21. "#1" was first aired on March 9 as a Space Shower exclusive video. A Music video for unusual was made March 9, 2011. It begins with Yamashita Tomohisa in a white jacket then it disappears by its own fire affect. Throughout the music video, Namie and Yamashita Tomohisa dance together, there are affections what make new scenes, the video ends with namie in the white jacket. This video was reported that it was filmed February 28, 2011, to March 1, 2011.

The songs "Black Diamond," "Do What U Gotta Do" and "Fake" already had music videos filmed for their respective releases. The music videos for these songs were put on the CD+DVD edition of the album. A music video for "Black Out" was shot in mid February by Parisian direction team Division, but due to the aftermath of 2011 Tōhoku earthquake and tsunami, the music video remains unaired.

== Critical reception ==
Professional ratings
Review scores
Source	Rating
Hot Express	(favorable)
Listen Japan	(favorable)
What's In?	(favorable)

Jun Watanabe of What's In? described the album as "...vividly transmitting artistic power and cool beauty." He believed that the work challenged forefronts in R&B, hip-hop, electropop and rock, without diminishing Amuro's personality. Tetsuo Hiraga of Hot Express was extremely positive on the album, feeling that it "explodes massively with personality and talent." Hiraga felt that Amuro's music had the ability to make the listener forget Tomohisa Yamashita's idol status, and to express his "cool and sexy vocals." When listening to Kaname Kawabata's voice in "#1," he could have been fooled that he was listening to American R&B music. Hiraga quoted Amuro on her thoughts on the album, and how she simply said that she "wants to do cool things." He felt like with such pure and innocent sentiment, only the greatest music could be made. Listen Japan's Morio Mori called the four new songs "perfect tunes," and called the album a "project that couldn't get any more wonderful."

== Commercial performance ==
In Japan, the album debuted at number one on physical data provider Oricon's daily album charts, selling 93,000 copies—85,000 more than her closest competitor, Hideaki Tokunaga with Vocalist & Ballade Best. In its first week, the album debuted at number one, selling a total of 253,000 copies. The album charted at number one for two consecutive weeks. Checkmate! debuted at number one on Oricon's monthly charts, despite only one week of charting counting to the April monthly chart. The album sold more than double the second place holder for the month, Kazumasa Oda's Dōmo. Halfway through the 2011 Oricon year, the album was the third most sold. On the Taiwanese G-Music charts, the album debuted at number six, the second highest debut of the week after Rachel Liang's third album, Soul Mate. The album debuted at number one on the international sub-chart, as well as the East Asian sub-chart.

Many songs on the album have charted on Japanese music charts, due to their release in promotion for either their original works, or Checkmate!.

Song charting positions
Year	Title	Chart positions			Sales	Certifications
Year	Title	JPN	JPN Hot	JPN RIAJ	Sales	Certifications
2008	"Black Diamond"	—	30	6*	—	Double platinum (ringtones); Gold (full-length cellphone downloads)
2009	"Rock U"	—	61	80	—	
2010	"Fake"	8	5	4	16,110	Gold (full-length cellphone downloads)
2011	"Wonder Woman"	—	5	5	—	Gold (full-length cellphone downloads)
2011	"Make It Happen"	—	73	10	—	
2011	"Unusual"	—	—	12	—	
2011	"#1"	—	—	57	—	

*Charted on monthly ringtone chart

== Track listing ==
CD
No.	Title	Lyrics	Music	Featured Artist	Length
1.	"Wonder Woman"	Tiger, Marek Pompetzki, Paul NZA, Chantal Kreviazuk, Tanya Lacey	Tiger, M. Pompetzki, P. NZA, C. Kreviazuk, T. Lacey	Anna Tsuchiya	3:10
2.	"Unusual"	Nao'ymt	Nao'ymt	Tomohisa Yamashita (from NEWS)	4:25
3.	"Make It Happen"	Double, Jörgen Elofsson, Erik Lidbom, Bonnie McKee	Double, J. Elofsson, E. Lidbom, B. McKee	After School	3:17
4.	"Rock U" (from Ravex's album Trax (2009))	Verbal	Ravex	Ravex	4:13
5.	"Do What U Gotta Do" (from Zeebra's album The New Beginning (2006))	Zeebra, Ai, Mummy-D	Ai, Zeebra	Zeebra, Ai and Mummy-D	5:04
6.	"Wet'N Wild" (from Heartsdales's album Sugar Shine (2003))	Heartsdales	Daisuke Imai	Heartsdales and Suite Chic	4:58
7.	"Do or Die" (from Jhett's album Jhett (2005))	Michico	Jhett, Michico	Jhett	4:07
8.	"Fake" (from Ai's album The Last Ai (2010))	Ai	George Tashiro	Ai	4:18
9.	"#1"	Tiger, Christopher Rojas, Curtis Richardson, Charlie Vox, Amos Winbush	Christopher Rojas (RMI)	Kaname Kawabata (from Chemistry)	3:22
10.	"Black Out" (from Verbal's album Visionair (2011))	Minami	Verbal, Minami, Major Dude, Jermaine Dupri	Verbal and Lil Wayne	3:46
11.	"Black Diamond" (from Double's album The Best Collaboration (2008))	Double	Double, Uta, Ryōsuke Imai	Double	4:04
12.	"Luvotomy" (from M-Flo's album Cosmicolor (2007))	M-Flo, Emi Hinouchi	M-Flo	M-Flo	5:14
13.	"After Party" (from Zeebra's album Tokyo Finest (2003))	Zeebra, R. Imai, DJ Ken-Bo	Firstklas (Zeebra, R. Imai)	Zeebra	4:55
14.	"Want Me, Want Me" (hidden track)	Michico	Michico, Sugi-V	Verbal	3:09
Total length:					58:04

DVD: Music video
No.	Title	Director(s)	Length
1.	"Wonder Woman"	Hideaki Sunaga
2.	"Unusual"	Shigeaki Kubo
3.	"Make It Happen"	Kubo
4.	"#1"	Kensuke Kawamura
5.	"Fake"	Ugichin
6.	"Black Diamond"	Kubo
7.	"Do What U Gotta Do"	Kenji Sonoda

== Personnel ==
Personnel details were sourced from Checkmate!'s liner notes booklet.

Managerial

- Hiromi Amano – A&R
- Shinji Hayashi – executive producer
- Shintaro Higuchi – producer
- Hisahiko Iida – producer
- Takashi Kasuga – executive producer
- Rui Maeda – producer
- Masato "Max" Matsuura – executive supervisor
- Hayato Mori – creative coordination
- Hiromi Owada – A&R desk
- Michiharu Sato – A&R supervisor
- Tetsuo Taira – executive supervisor
- Kazumi Yanagi – A&R chief
- Rika Yasumoto –artist management
- Yuko Yasumoto – production coordination (#1)

Performance credits

- Ai – vocals (#1, #5, #8)
- After School – vocals (#3)
- Namie Amuro – vocals, background vocals
- Double – vocals, background vocals (#11)
- Heartsdales – vocals (#6)
- Emi Hinouchi – background vocals (#4)
- Daisuke Imai – background vocals, keyboards (#6)
- Kaname Kawabata – vocals (#9)
- Lil Wayne – rap (#10)
- Minami (Cream) – background vocals (#10)
- Mummy-D – vocals (#4)
- Paul NZA – instruments (#1)
- Shinichi Osawa – "Rock" voice (#4)
- Marek Pompetzki – instruments (#1)
- Chris Rojas – instruments (#9)
- Anna Tsuchiya – vocals (#1)
- Verbal – rap (#6, #10)
- Tomohisa Yamashita – vocals (#2)
- Zeebra – vocals (#4, #13)

Visuals and imagery

- Mamoru Furumoto – stage set design
- Shinichi Mita – stylist
- Akemi Nakano – hair, make-up
- Takuya Nakashiro – art direction, design
- Shoji Uchida – photographer

Technical and production

- D.O.I. – mixing (at Daimonion Recordings) (#1—3, #7—9, #11)
- DJ Ken-Bo – production (#13)
- Double – production (#11)
- Jermaine Dupri – production (#10)
- Jörgen Elofsson – production (#3)
- Chris Gahringer – mastering
- Kohei Hatakeyama – Namie Amuro vocals recording (#2—#3, #9)
- Daisuke Imai – production, programming (#6)
- Ryosuke Imai – production (#11, #13)
- Osamu "Shu" Imamoto – engineering (#4), mixing (#10), recording (#10)
- Jhett – arrangement, production, programming (#7)
- Hitomi Joko – recording (#1)
- Takefumi Kanaya – recording (#6)
- Shigeki Kashii – recording (#1)
- Hyuga Kashiwai – recording (#7)
- Ryosuke Kataoka – recording (#1, #4, #8, #10)
- Gonta Kawamoto – mixing (#6)
- Kim Min Hee – After School vocals recording (#3)
- Erik Lidbom – production (#3)
- Major Dude – production (#10)
- Michico – production, vocal production and direction (#7)
- Rie Mimoto – Kaname Kawabata vocal recording (#9)
- Chieko Nakayama – Kaname Kawabata vocal direction (#9)
- Nao'ymt – production (#2)
- Paul NZA – production, recording (#1)
- Supa Okuda – Ai vocals recording (#8)
- Shinichi Osawa – mixing (at Tomigaya Lounge) (#4), production (#4)
- Marek Pompetzki – production, recording (#1)
- Chris Rojas – production (#9)
- Taku Takahashi – production (#4, #12), sound programming (#12)
- Take-C for T.O.P – recording, mixing (#5, #13)
- Teturo Takeuchi – Tomohisa Yamashita vocals recording (#2)
- Tomoyuki Tanaka – production (#4)
- Tiger – vocal direction (#1, #3, #8—9)
- Masaya Wada – vocal direction (#10)
- UTA – production (#8, #11)
- Verbal – production (#6, #10, #12), sound programming (#12)
- Zeebra – production (#5, #13)

== Charts ==
=== Weekly charts ===
Chart (2011)	Peak position
Japanese Albums (Oricon)	1
South Korean Albums (Gaon)	29
South Korean Overseas Albums (Gaon)	5
Taiwanese Albums (G-Music)	6
Taiwanese International Albums (G-Music)	1

=== Monthly charts ===
Chart (2011)	Peak position
Japanese Albums (Oricon)	1

=== Year-end charts ===
Chart (2011)	Position
Japanese Albums (Oricon)	6

== Sales and certifications ==
Region	Certification	Certified units/sales
Japan (RIAJ)	2× Platinum	495,719

== Release history ==
Region	Date	Format	Distributing Label
Japan	April 27, 2011	CD, CD+DVD, digital download	Avex Trax
Taiwan	April 29, 2011	CD, CD+DVD	Avex Taiwan
South Korea	May 4, 2011	CD+DVD	S.M. Entertainment
Hong Kong	May 6, 2011	CD, CD+DVD	Avex Asia
Japan	May 14, 2011	Rental CD	Avex Trax
Thailand	December 23, 2011	CD	GMM Grammy
Japan	June 27, 2012	Playbutton	Avex Trax
Japan	September 16, 2012	CD (low price edition)	Avex Trax
