= Namie Amuro 5 Major Domes Tour =

2012-13 concert tour by Namie Amuro

5 Major Domes Tour 2012 ~20th Anniversary Best~
- Tour by Namie Amuro
- DVD artwork
- Associated album: Uncontrolled
- Start date: November 24, 2012
- End date: March 16, 2013
- Legs: 2
- No. of shows: 11

Namie Amuro concert chronology
- Live Style 2011 (2011); 5 Major Domes Tour 2012 (2012–13); Feel Tour (2013)

Namie Amuro 5 Major Domes Tour was a concert tour by Japanese recording artist Namie Amuro, held in support of her album Uncontrolled (2012), as well as a celebration of the 20th anniversary of her debut with the Super Monkey's. It spanned eight shows at five domes across Japan from November to December 2012, and attracted around 340,000 people.

The Asian leg of the tour, promoted as "20th Anniversary Namie Amuro Asia Tour 2013", was held in February and March 2013 in Taipei and Hong Kong. The concerts attracted around 30,000 people. A concert at the Singapore Indoor Stadium was scheduled for April 26, but was cancelled due to issues with the local promoter.

== Background ==
Before the beginning of the tour, Amuro planned her "Namie Amuro 20th Anniversary Live in Okinawa" concert in her home prefecture of Okinawa for mid-September 2012, but this was cancelled due to Typhoon Sanba affecting Okinawa at the time. An 8-day dome tour across Japan, titled "5 Major Domes Tour ~20th Anniversary Best~", was held in November and December 2012, featuring performances in Fukuoka, Osaka, Sapporo, Nagoya and Tokyo. On July 24, after all of the concert dates had sold out, an extra concert was added in Nagoya.

=== Asian leg ===
The Asian leg of the tour, promoted as "Namie Amuro Asia Tour 2013", was conducted early the following year. Originally, a show was scheduled in Singapore at the Singapore Indoor Stadium on April 26, 2013; this would have been Amuro's first concert in Singapore. However, the tour's website announced that the concert would be cancelled, citing "issues concerning the local promoter", which was later changed to "local technical reasons". Some speculated that the cancellation may have actually been related to poor ticket sales.

== Commercial performance ==
The 2012 dome tour attracted a total of 340,000 people in Japan, while the 2013 Asia tour attracted 20,000 people in Taipei and 10,000 people in Hong Kong. China Times reported that the Taipei concerts generated about NT$60 million (US$2,022,000) in total revenue from ticket sales, as well as an additional NT$50 million ($1,685,000) in tourism revenue from overseas fans traveling to Taiwan to attend the concerts.

== Set list ==
1. "Body Feels Exit"
2. "How to Be a Girl"
3. "Hot Girls"
4. "Naked"
5. "Sit! Stay! Wait! Down!"
6. "Get Myself Back"
7. "Girl Talk"
8. "New Look"
9. "Go Round"
10. "In the Spotlight (Tokyo)"
11. "Fight Together"
12. "You're My Sunshine"
13. "Don't Wanna Cry"
14. "Respect the Power of Love"
15. "Never End"
16. "A Walk in the Park"
17. "Sweet 19 Blues"
18. "Love Story"
19. "Damage"
20. "Break It"
21. "Yeah-Oh"
22. "Chase the Chance"
23. "Let's Go"

Encore

1. "Try Me (Watashi o Shinjite)"
2. "Taiyou no Season"
3. "Aishite Muscat"
4. "Baby Don't Cry"
5. "Can You Celebrate?"
6. "Only You"
7. "Say the Word"

== Tour dates ==
5 Major Domes Tour 2012
| Date (2012) | City | Country | Venue | Attendance |
|---|---|---|---|---|
| November 24 | Fukuoka | Japan | Fukuoka Yahoo! Japan Dome | 340,000 |
| December 1 | Osaka | Japan | Kyocera Dome Osaka | 340,000 |
| December 2 | Osaka | Japan | Kyocera Dome Osaka | 340,000 |
| December 8 | Sapporo | Japan | Sapporo Dome | 340,000 |
| December 15 | Nagoya | Japan | Nagoya Dome | 340,000 |
| December 16 | Nagoya | Japan | Nagoya Dome | 340,000 |
| December 20 | Tokyo | Japan | Tokyo Dome | 340,000 |
| December 21 | Tokyo | Japan | Tokyo Dome | 340,000 |
| Total | | | | 340,000 |

Namie Amuro Asia Tour 2013
| Date (2013) | City | Country | Venue | Attendance |
|---|---|---|---|---|
| February 23 | Taipei | Taiwan | Taipei Arena | 20,000 |
| February 24 | Taipei | Taiwan | Taipei Arena | 20,000 |
| March 16 | Hong Kong | | AsiaWorld–Arena | 10,000 |
| Total | | | | 30,000 |

=== Cancelled shows ===
| Date (2013) | City | Venue | Reason |
|---|---|---|---|
| April 26 | Singapore | Singapore Indoor Stadium | "Breach of agreement" |

== DVD release ==
5 Major Domes Tour 2012 ~20th Anniversary Best~

Video by Namie Amuro
- Released: February 27, 2013
- Recorded: 2012
- Label: Avex Trax

Namie Amuro chronology
| Namie Amuro Live Style 2011 (2011) | 5 Major Domes Tour 2012 ~20th Anniversary Best~ (2013) | Namie Amuro Feel Tour 2013 (2013) |

The live music video of the tour, titled Namie Amuro 5 Major Domes Tour 2012 ~20th Anniversary Best~, was released on February 27, 2013. It peaked at number one on the Oricon DVD and blu-ray charts, as well as number two on the G-Music audio/video chart in Taiwan.

The DVD received a platinum certification from the Recording Industry Association of Japan (RIAJ) in April 2013 for shipments of over 250,000 copies. It won Best Music Video in the Japanese music section at the 28th Japan Gold Disc Awards in 2014.

=== Charts ===
| Chart (2013) | Peak position |
|---|---|
| Japanese DVD Chart (Oricon) | 1 |
| Japanese Blu-ray Chart (Oricon) | 1 |
| Taiwanese Audio/Video Chart (G-Music) | 2 |

=== Certifications ===
| Region | Certification | Certified units/sales |
|---|---|---|
| Japan (RIAJ) | Platinum | 250,000^{^} |
^{^} Shipments figures based on certification alone.
