= Visionair (album) =

Studio album by Verbal
- Released: March 16, 2011
- Recorded: 2010–2011
- Genre: Hip hop; electro
- Length: 47:48
- Language: Japanese; English
- Label: Rhythm Zone
- Producer: M-Flo; Jermaine Dupri

Singles from Visionair
- 1. "Fall Out" Released: December 1, 2010; 2. "Change Change" Released: March 2, 2011; 3. "Black Out" Released: 2011 (cancelled)

Visionair is the debut album of Japanese rapper Verbal, from the group M-Flo. It was released on March 16, 2011, one and a half years after M-Flo's 10th anniversary greatest hits album, MF10: 10th Anniversary Best. Due to the effects of the 2011 Tōhoku earthquake and tsunami which occurred five days beforehand, promotions for the album were cancelled, including a music video for the song "Black Out."

== Background ==
M-Flo released their last studio album of their Loves… artist collaboration era, Cosmicolor in 2007, followed by two compilation albums, Award Supernova: Loves Best (2008) and MF10: 10th Anniversary Best (2009). In 2009, an M-Flo tribute album was released, Tribute: Maison de M-Flo, which featured songs from new artists who had not been featured on a loves album.

On September 17, 2010, Verbal released his first solo song. He covered "Cherry Bomb" by The Runaways with his wife Yoon on vocals, for the 50 Years of Dr. Martens project, which was released as a compilation album in October 2010.

At the same time as Verbal was working on his solo debut, band member Taku Takahashi was working on a solo dance music project, The Suitboys. He released the mix-tape After 5 Vol. 1 a month after the album's release, on April 20, 2011.

== Promotion ==
The first song announced on the album was "Fall Out," which was used as the opening theme of the drama Perfect Report in October 2010. The song featured Shunya, a member of Senme, an a cappella group that won first place on the Fuji TV show Seishun A Cappella Kōshien: Zenkoku Hamonep League 2010 Haru. Verbal met Shunya at a school event at his previous school, St. Mary's International School, and was impressed by his vocal abilities. It was released in December 2010. Shunya later covered M-Flo's song "LOT (Love or Truth)" on Tribute: Stitch the Future and Past, the successor to Tribute: Maison de M-Flo, which was released on April 20, 2011.

"Black Out" was released as a ringtone at Recochoku on March 2, 2011. A music video was produced for the song, but never officially released by Verbal.

The album was released for pre-order to iTunes on March 2, 2011, with the song "Change Change" featuring Nicki Minaj included as a preceding download. If the album was preordered, the song "Some Other Place" featuring Drake was included as a bonus.

Later in 2011 and 2012, the album was toured with the Angree Yung Robotz Tour alongside Mademoiselle Yulia.

== Conception and writing ==
Verbal had planned on a solo project for many years while in M-Flo and Teriyaki Boyz, after often being asked by producers such as Jermaine Dupri and Pharrell why he did not have one. The project came to life in 2010. While creating songs, Verbal made several that did not fit with the sounds of M-Flo or Teriyaki Boyz. Eventually, there were enough of these songs that Verbal decided to make a solo album.

Verbal named the album Visionair, because of how he turned ideas in the production time into reality, and decided which he thought were "real" sounding or "fake" sounding.

The album features collaborations with R&B musicians from America as well as Japan. American rappers Lil Wayne and Nicki Minaj are featured on the album, as well as Canadian R&B singer Drake. American producer Jermaine Dupri produced the song "Black Out." He and Verbal had been sending emails to each other for a while. At one point, Dupri told Verbal that rapper Lil Wayne was working in the studio next to his. Verbal asked if they could collaborate, and he agreed. The recording of "Black Out" became the beginning of the solo project.

Another American producer who worked on the album was Swizz Beatz, who made the song "Ball n Bounce." He and Teriyaki Boyz had wanted to collaborate, but due to timing issues they had not. Instead, Swizz Beats worked with Verbal's solo project. Many other songs were created with overseas producers for the album, but since they did not fit the album, they were not included.

Four Japanese vocalists are featured on the album. Namie Amuro, who has worked with Verbal since the 2001 single "Lovin' It" is on the song "Black Out." She later featured the song on her collaborations best album, Checkmate!, in April 2011. "Fall Out" features Shunya, an unsigned singer who Verbal met at an event at his former high school. Mademoiselle Yulia, a singer who is produced by Verbal, was featured on the song "Liar." The pair have collaborated four times since 2008: on the Dexpistols song "Saturdays," on the Teriyaki Boyz song "After 5 (A.M.)," on the Towa Tei song "YOR," and on Mademoiselle Yulia's song "What Now?" which was featured on M-Flo Inside: Works Best III. She later released her Verbal-produced debut album Mademoworld on September 21, 2011. Minami from the band CREAM is featured on the song "Hey Mister," and also wrote the lyrics to "Black Out." Minami first collaborated with Verbal on the songwriting for BoA's single "Bump Bump!" in 2009, and was later featured on the Teriyaki Boyz on the song "Even More."

Japanese DJ Shinichi Osawa produced the songs "Dope Boy Fresh" and "Nothing" for the album. Osawa worked in 2009 with Verbal on the song "Rock U" featuring Namie Amuro, for the Ravex DJ project. They worked again in 2011 on Amuro's song "Naked." Three Tokyo-based DJs under Verbal's production agency [www.kozm-agency.tv Kozm] were featured on the album: Lucas Valentine on "I Can't Help Myself" and "I Want It All," Suguru Yamamoto on "Hey Mister," "You Are…" and "I See You," and Major Dude on "Vision in the Air," "Black Out," "Hey Mister," "Change Change," "Stomp Dem Roach" and "Liar." New York-based producer John Fontein, who is associated with Kozm, made the songs "Fall Out" and "Change Change" for the album.

Originally a CD+DVD version of the album was planned (RZCD-46833/B), however it was scrapped.

== Track listing ==
No.	Title	Length
1.	"Vision in the Air"	1:15
2.	"Black Out" (featuring Lil Wayne and Namie Amuro)	3:45
3.	"I Can't Help Myself"	3:39
4.	"Ball n Bounce"	3:23
5.	"Dope Boy Fresh"	4:17
6.	"Fall Out" (featuring Shunya)	3:12
7.	"Hey Mister" (featuring Minami of CREAM)	3:18
8.	"I Want It All"	3:05
9.	"Change Change" (featuring Nicki Minaj)	3:49
10.	"Stomp Dem Roach"	3:44
11.	"Liar" (featuring Mademoiselle Yulia)	2:40
12.	"You Are…"	3:36
13.	"I See You"	1:41
14.	"Nothing"	3:46
15.	"Take You Far (Percapella Ver.)" (CD hidden track, performed by M-Flo)	2:32
Total length:		47:48

iTunes pre-order bonus track
No.	Title	Writer(s)	Length
15.	"Some Other Place" (featuring Drake)	Verbal	3:55
Total length:			49:11

== Charts ==
Chart (2011)	Peak position
Oricon weekly albums	35

=== Reported sales ===
Chart	Amount
Oricon physical sales	6,100

== Release history ==
Region	Date	Format	Distributing Label
Japan	March 16, 2011	CD, digital download	Rhythm Zone
Japan	April 2, 2011	Rental CD	Rhythm Zone
