= Uncontrolled (album) =

- CD only cover

Studio album by Namie Amuro
- Released: June 27, 2012
- Recorded: 2010–2012
- Studios: Prime Sound Studio Form (Meguro, Tokyo); Azabu O Studio (Nishi-Azabu, Minato, Tokyo); Avex Studio (Azabu, Tokyo); Bunkamura Studio (Shibuya, Tokyo); Record Plant (Los Angeles, California); Sound City (Azabudai, Minato, Tokyo)
- Genres: Electropop; dance-pop
- Length: 50:17
- Languages: Japanese; English
- Label: Avex Trax
- Producers: Hisahiko Iida; Shintaro Higuchi; Daisuke Shimokawa

Namie Amuro chronology
Checkmate! (2011)	Uncontrolled (2012)	Feel (2013)

Alternative cover
- CD+DVD edition

Singles from Uncontrolled
- 1. "Break It" / "Get Myself Back" Released: July 28, 2010; 2. "Naked" / "Fight Together" / "Tempest" Released: July 27, 2011; 3. "Sit! Stay! Wait! Down!" / "Love Story" Released: December 7, 2011; 4. "Go Round" / "Yeah-Oh!" Released: March 21, 2012

Uncontrolled is the tenth studio album by Japanese singer Namie Amuro, released on June 27, 2012. It is Amuro's first original album since Past<Future (2009) and her first original album for her 20th anniversary of her debut. It was released in three formats: CD+DVD, CD and Playbutton (limited edition). Uncontrolled consists mostly of songs performed in Japanese, but was also Amuro's first album to feature several songs sung entirely in English, including "Go Round", "Yeah-Oh", "In The Spotlight (Tokyo)," "Hot Girls", and "Only You".

Uncontrolled was met with mostly positive reviews from music critics and was shortlisted at the Asia Association Music Prize Awards. The album became a commercial success and spent three weeks at number one on Oricon Albums Chart, becoming Amuro's second album to achieve this after Best Fiction (2008) spent six weeks at number one. The album was certified double platinum by the Recording Industry Association of Japan. This was her fifth consecutive number one album since 2007, and her sixth consecutive double platinum album since 2005. Amuro promoted the album by embarking on the Namie Amuro 5 Major Domes Tour across Asia between 2012 and 2013.

== Background and development ==
Uncontrolled is Amuro's first original studio album since 2009's Past < Future, and follows her collaboration compilation album Checkmate!, released in 2011. Unlike Past < Future, which was released after only one physical single, Uncontrolled is a compilation of nine songs from singles released between 2010 and 2012, as well as four new songs. Amuro revealed later in an interview that an idea for the album was conceived in early 2012. The album was created as a collection of songs that Amuro wanted to sing, in contrast to a concept or theme-based album.

Of the nine tracks released as singles before the album, four achieved digital sales high enough to receive certifications from the Recording Industry Association of Japan (RIAJ): "Fight Together", "Get Myself Back", and "Sit! Stay! Wait! Down!" were all certified gold for full-length cellphone downloads, and "Love Story" was certified triple platinum for ringtones and double platinum for full-length cellphone downloads. It was Amuro's highest certified song in four years, since 2008's "New Look."

Most of the songs were recorded in Tokyo, at Prime Sound Studio Form, with additional recording at Azabu O Studio, Avex Studio, and Bunkamura Studio. The exception was "Let's Go", which was recorded at Record Plant in Los Angeles, where Amuro had previously recorded in the 1990s for her albums Sweet 19 Blues (1996), Concentration 20 (1997), and Genius 2000 (2000).

== Writing and production ==
Five songs on the album are performed entirely in English – three new tracks "In the Spotlight (Tokyo)," "Hot Girls" and "Only You," as well as English versions of the songs from Amuro's preceding single "Go Round / Yeah-Oh!", which are included under the titles "Go Round ('N Round 'N Round)" and "Singing "Yeah-Oh!"" respectively. In an interview with Billboard Japan, Amuro stated that the English tracks were not made with an overseas audience in mind, and that she chose to sing them in English because she thought they would sound better in that language.

The album's songs featured seven different sound producers, with longtime collaborator Nao'ymt and new collaborator T-SK producing four songs each. Nao'ymt, who had worked with Amuro since 2005 on songs such as "Baby Don't Cry" and "Hide and Seek," worked on four tracks, "Break It," "Get Myself Back," "Fight Together" and "Tempest." T-SK, who began working with Amuro in 2011, produced "Go Round," "Let's Go," "Love Story" and "Yeah-Oh" — all songs written by Australian band The Nervo Twins. In addition to the songs with the Nervo Twins, Amuro worked on three additional songs with the Nervo Twins' music publishing company, the Sweden based Razor Boy Music Publishing. "In the Spotlight (Tokyo)," "Hot Girls" and "Only You" were produced by Henrik Nordenback, Michael Smith and Peter Mansson respectively. Of the seven songs featuring Razor Boy Music Publishing artists, five were sung entirely in English. Of these songs, Tiger wrote Japanese lyrics for "Let's Go" "Love Story," and the Japanese versions of "Go Round / Yeah-Oh!" that appear on the single were written by Aili and Double respectively.

The remaining two producers are also previous collaborators of Amuro's: T. Kura ("Funky Town" (2007), "New Look" (2008)) worked with Michico on the track "Sit! Stay! Wait! Down!," while Japanese DJ Shinichi Osawa ("What a Feeling" (2008)) produced "Naked" with M-Flo member Verbal writing the lyrics.

== Promotion and release ==
"Love Story" (2011)
The most commercially successful single of the era, "Love Story" is a medium tempo ballad used as the theme song for the drama The Reason I Can't Find My Love.

"Fight Together" (2011)
The pop song "Fight Together" was Amuro's first Japanese anime collaboration in eight years.

"Naked" (2011)
The Shinichi Osawa produced dance track "Naked" was used in a nationwide KOSÉ campaign.

Songs from Uncontrolled were featured in two major commercial campaigns featuring Amuro as their spokeswoman. "Break It" was used for the Coca-Cola Zero "Wild Heart" campaign in 2010, a tie-in that also featured her songs "Wild" (2009) and "Wonder Woman" (2011). Japanese cosmetic firm KOSÉ used "Naked" and "Go Round" in campaigns for their Esprique line of eye-make up. "Hot Girls" was also used in a commercial campaign. Amuro had previously worked with Kosé in 2001, in a lipstick campaign featuring "Say the Word."

Of the single tracks, four were used in prime-time television shows as their theme songs. "Fight Together" was used as the third theme song for the anime One Piece's 14th season. This was the first time in eight years since Amuro had a song associated with a popular anime, the last being "Come" and "Four Seasons" from her 2003 album Style. "Tempest" was the eponymous theme song of the television drama Tempest (2010), based on Okinawan novelist Eiichi Ikegami's 2008 novel. "Sit! Stay! Wait! Down!" and "Love Story" were used as the theme songs for the ensemble drama The Reason I Can't Find My Love (2011), starring actresses Karina, Yuriko Yoshitaka and AKB48 member Yuko Oshima. Amuro made a cameo performance on the December 12, 2011, episode of the drama, performing the theme song.

"Only You," an album track, was used as the theme song for the WOWOW TV broadcast of the UEFA Euro 2012 soccer tournament. WOWOW also broadcast three TV specials about Amuro for her anniversary. Namie Amuro 20th Anniversary Special: Live History & Document of Namie Amuro, broadcast on June 2, 2012, featured behind the scenes footage of the "Only You" video, as well as archive footage of Amuro's lives, music videos and an interview. On November 3 and 4, 2012, Namie Amuro 20th Anniversary Special #2: Live Future & Document of Namie Amuro was released, followed the next day by live footage from her September 16 performance Namie Amuro 0th Anniversary Live in Okinawa. The preceding documentary featured rehearsal footage for the live, interviews with collaborators who participated in the concert, and footage of Amuro's promotional tour across Asia.

In May 2012, a smartphone application was released to Apple's App Store and Google Play, in promotion for the album, Amuro's 2012 tour, and her 20th anniversary. In late May 2012 outside of Shinjuku Station in Tokyo, an 8m high billboard painting of the album cover was created over two days, revealing the album cover for the first time. The background of the cover features the annular solar eclipse of May 21, 2012, which was seen as a total eclipse in Tokyo. Amuro made appearances at radio stations in Fukuoka, Sapporo, Nagoya, Osaka and Kyoto. In Sapporo Station, a temporary Namie Amuro exhibit was erected at the Paseo department store.

For promotion of the album, Amuro was featured in many fashion magazines, including Blenda, Gisele, Glamorous, Mina, S Cawaii!, Spring, Sweet and Vivi. Namie Amuro travelled to Taiwan, Hong Kong and Singapore in late June and early July 2012 to promote the album. During the stop, Amuro held several press conferences, and a series of club dance events called Amuro Night were held. While Amuro herself did not dance at the events, she attended the event at Singapore's St James Power Station.

=== Promotional singles ===
The four new songs from the album received a gradual ringtone release before the album. The first of these, "Only You," was released as a digital download to cellphones on the day of the album's release. Prior to the album's release, "Only You" received enough radio airplay to chart at number 7 on Billboard's Japan Hot 100 chart. on RIAJ's cellphone download chart, "Only You" charted at number five for two consecutive weeks. "In the Spotlight (Tokyo)" was released on July 4, 2012, as a full-length cellphone download. The song received enough radio airplay prior to the album's release to chart on the Japan Hot 100 at number 46. The song reached number 15 on RIAJ's download chart. "Let's Go" was released in full on July 11, 2012, and "Hot Girls" was released later on July 25. "Let's Go" reached number 29 on RIAJ.

== Music videos ==
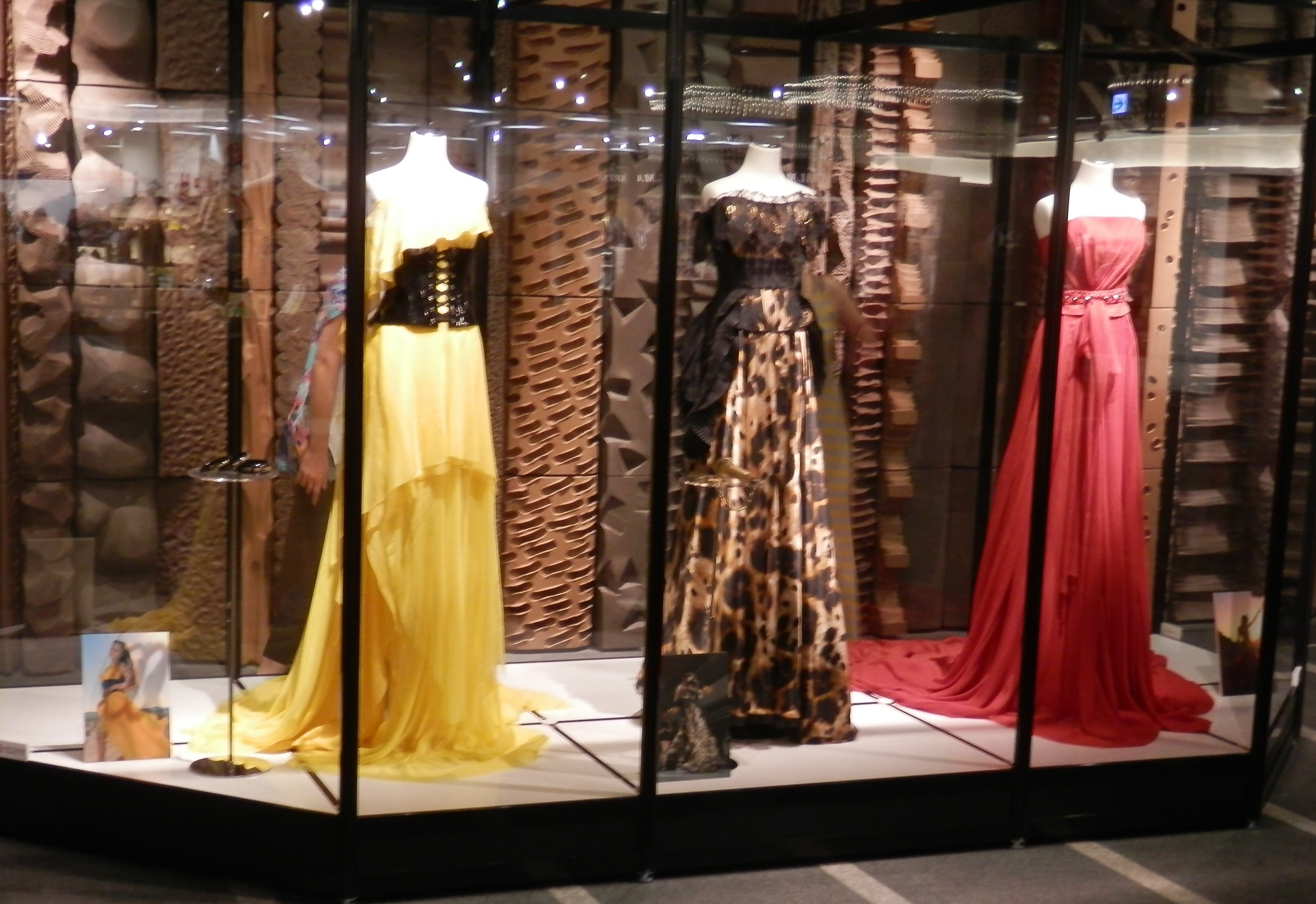
Two dresses from "Only You" and one from "Hot Girls" on exhibit.

Uncontrolled features the largest number of MVs in Amuro's career: seven MVs from singles, and the remaining four of the new tracks. "Get Myself Back" was shot at her birthplace, Okinawa, and was the first video of hers to be shot there. The location was chosen to express the sentiment of the song. "Only You" was directed by American director Thomas Kloss. The music video for "Only You" was shot overseas, in a desert near Los Angeles. "In the Spotlight (Tokyo)"'s music video was shot with the concept of "making Tokyo a gigantic dance floor," with scenes of the Shuto Expressway, the pedestrian scrambles in Shibuya, Tokyo Skytree and Tokyo Tower featured in the video. "Let's Go" features scenes shot with a high-speed camera that revolved about Amuro while she was performing the song.

At the 2012 MTV Video Music Awards Japan, "Love Story" won the Best Female Video award, while "Naked" received a nomination for Best Pop Video. At the previous year's 2011 MTV Video Music Aid Japan awards, "Break It" was nominated for the video of the year. For the upcoming is nominated for the Best Female Video award, and "Naked" is nominated for the Best Pop Video award. On June 23, 2012, Space Shower music video channel aired a special compilation of Amuro's music videos. Amuro was chosen as the "artist of the month" at MTV Japan for July 2012.

== Critical reception ==
Professional ratings
Review scores
Source	Rating
Hot Express	(favorable)
Listen Japan	(favorable)
Rolling Stone Japan	3/5 stars

Uncontrolled received generally positive reviews. Yoshiki Aoyuki of Listen Japan agreed with the album's title, finding that the music sounded unrestrained. He was impressed with the variety of songs even though many of them were dance tunes. He likened the "euro-disco" sound of "Only You" to the sound of Kylie Minogue. Tetsu Hiraga of Hot Express was extremely impressed with the album, in particular "In the Spotlight (Tokyo)," calling it "the best kind of electro pop." He felt that every song had a similar impressive impact. He described the first single, "Break It," as "Amuro's voice dancing over a tricky guitar and bass." He found her "aggressively shouted singing" very exciting. He enjoyed the mis-match in the song "Sit! Stay! Wait! Down!" between the music, a "thick track with deep vocals" and the "girly in-love lyrics." Hiraga felt that "Yeah-Oh" had a "densely Western sound" that was not seen in any other Japanese musicians.

Hiraga believed in all the reviews of her singles that Amuro was "aiming for the highest quality music." Rolling Stone Japan author Kazumi Namba felt the album was "consistent and unshaking," and called the album "approximately Western" and noted how it followed current global trends in global pop music. He called the English recordings "ambitious," and was surprised at how different the work was to her roots in 1990s J-pop. He rated the album three out of five.

== Commercial performance ==
Uncontrolled was Amuro's 10th album to debut at number one on physical data provider Oricon's weekly albums chart, with 292,098 copies. The album stayed at number one for three weeks, and was the second album in her career to achieve this after Best Fiction. Much like her previous album Checkmate! 105,000 copies of the album were sold on the first day. In its first week, it outsold the second place album, Greeeen's Uta..., by 200,000 copies. The album after one week's sales became the top selling album by a soloist released by that point in 2012 – surpassing Ayaka's The Beginning's total sales by 84,000 copies. It has since been topped by Keisuke Kuwata's I Love You: Now & Forever. The CD+DVD version of the album outsold the CD Only edition by more than eight times in the first week, according to physical data tracker SoundScan Japan. The first week total was better than Amuro's previous album, the collaboration compilation Checkmate!, which had sold 252,000 copies. However, Amuro's previous studio album, Past<Future, outsold Uncontrolled's first week by 39,000 copies. In Taiwan, Uncontrolled debuted at number five, underneath Yoga Lin, Big Bang, Nick Chou and Christine Fan. In its second week, it fell to number 15. In South Korea, the album reached number 36 on the Gaon albums charts, and in its second week fell out of the top 100.

== Live performances ==
Amuro had planned to hold a special live concert in her birthplace of Okinawa on September 16, 2012, the 20th anniversary of her debut as a member of the Super Monkey's. The live was set to feature guest appearances by Ai, Chemistry's Kaname Kawabata, Mummy-D (of Rhymester), Anna Tsuchiya, Verbal (of M-Flo) and Zeebra. However, due to the approach of Typhoon Samba, the concert was cancelled the day before the show. Because of the nature of the concert, Amuro's management announced that the concert would not be rescheduled.

In November, Amuro embarked on a dome tour in Japan tiled Namie Amuro 5 Major Domes Tour, featuring performances in Fukuoka, Osaka, Sapporo, Nagoya and Tokyo. The Asian leg of the tour, promoted as Namie Amuro Asia Tour 2013, was held in February and March 2013.

Some songs featured on the album were previously performed in Amuro's past tours. "Break It" and "Get Myself Back" were performed on Amuro's Past<Future Tour 2010 tour, and "Break It," "Fight Together," "Get Myself Back," "Naked" and "Tempest" were performed at Live Style 2011. "Love Story" was performed at later dates on Live Style 2011; however, it was not included in the performance DVD.

== Track listing ==
The finalised track list was first released on Amuro's official YouTube channel on June 8, 2012.

CD
No.	Title	Lyrics	Music	Length
1.	"In the Spotlight (Tokyo)"	Henrik Nordenback, Christian Fast	H. Nordenback, C. Fast	3:58
2.	"Naked"	Verbal	Shinichi Osawa	4:22
3.	"Go Round ('N Round 'N Round)"	Liv Nervo, Mim Nervo	T-SK, Kim Tesung, L. Nervo, M. Nervo	3:21
4.	"Sit! Stay! Wait! Down!"	Michico	T. Kura, Michico	3:14
5.	"Hot Girls"	L. Nervo, M. Nervo, Michael Dennis Smith, Stefanie Ridel	L. Nervo, M. Nervo, M. Smith, S. Ridel	2:59
6.	"Break It (Al Ver.)"	Nao'ymt	Nao'ymt	3:22
7.	"Get Myself Back"	Nao'ymt	Nao'ymt	4:32
8.	"Love Story"	Tiger	T-SK, T. Kim, L. Nervo, M. Nervo	4:44
9.	"Let's Go"	Tiger, L. Nervo, M. Nervo	T-SK, T. Kim, L. Nervo, M. Nervo	3:11
10.	"Singing "Yeah-Oh!""	L. Nervo, M. Nervo	T-SK, T. Kim, L. Nervo, M. Nervo,	3:23
11.	"Fight Together"	Nao'ymt	Nao'ymt	4:17
12.	"Only You"	Didrik Thott, C. Fast, Peter Mansson, Sharon Vaughn	D. Thott, C. Fast, P. Mansson, S. Vaughn	4:14
13.	"Tempest"	Nao'ymt	Nao'ymt	4:35
Total length:				50:17

DVD
No.	Title	Director(s)	Length
1.	"In the Spotlight (Tokyo)"	Shigeaki Kubo
2.	"Naked"	Kosai Sekine
3.	"Go Round"	S. Kubo
4.	"Hot Girls"	Kazuaki Seki
5.	"Break It"	S. Kubo
6.	"Get Myself Back"	S. Kubo
7.	"Love Story"	Kensuke Kawamura
8.	"Let's Go"	K. Kawamura
9.	"Yeah-Oh"	Masaki Takehisa
10.	"Only You"	Thomas Kloss
11.	"Tempest"	K. Sekine

== Personnel ==
Personnel details were sourced from Uncontrolled's liner notes booklet.

Managerial

- Hiromi Amano – A&R
- Shinji Hayashi – executive producer
- Shintaro Higuchi – producer
- Hisahiko Iida – producer
- Toru Ishitsuka – orchestra coordinator (#13)
- Takashi Kasuga – executive producer
- Koji Makuuchi – musician coordinator (#13)
- Masato "Max" Matsuura – executive supervisor
- Kazutaka Naya – musician coordinator (#13)
- Hiromi Owada – A&R desk
- Michiharu Sato – A&R supervisor
- Ryosuke Sekii – A&R
- Daisuke Shimokawa – producer
- Tetsuo Taira – executive supervisor
- Rie Wada – artist management
- Kazumi Yanagi – A&R chief

Performance credits

- Namie Amuro – vocals, background vocals
- Tomoyuki Asakawa – harp (#13)
- Kenshow Hagiwara – horn (#13)
- Masaaki Kawamura – oboe (#13)
- Mari Ishida – piano (#13)
- Tsutomu Isohata – horn (#13)
- Yoichi Murata – trombone (#13)
- Mim Nervo – background vocals (#5)
- Liv Nervo – background vocals (#5)
- Shin Ohmura – guitars (#6)
- Koh Okumura – trombone (#13)
- Masahiko Sugasaka – trumpet (#13)
- Hideyo Takakuwa – flute (#13)
- Tokunaga Tomomi Strings – string section (#13)
- Junko Wakamitsu – flute (#13)
- Kimio Yamane – clarinet (#13)
- Hitoshi Yokoyama – trumpet (#13)

Visuals and imagery

- Takeshi Hanzawa – photographer
- Taku Hatao – photographic operation
- Akemi Nakano – hair, make-up
- Akira Noda – stylist
- Through. – art direction, design

Technical and production

- Tom Coyne – mastering (at Sterling Sound)
- D.O.I. – mixing (at Daimonion Recordings) (#1, #3—13)
- Kohei Hatakeyama – recording (#8)
- Susumu Isa – vocal direction (#8)
- Ryosuke Kataoka – recording (#1—13)
- Chifumi Karasawa – orchestra recording (at Sound City) (#13)
- HiDE Kawada – music direction (#3, #8—10)
- Neeraj Khajanchi – recording (#10)
- Peter Mansson – production (#12)
- Michico – vocal production (#4)
- Tatsuya Murayama – orchestra arrangement (#13)
- Nao'ymt – production (#6—7, #11, #13)
- Henrik Nordenback – production (#1)
- Shinichi Osawa – arrangement, mixing, production (#2)
- Kenji Sano – vocal direction (#1, #3, #5, #9, #12)
- Michael "Smidi" Smith – production (#5)
- Tiger – chorus arrangement (#2), vocal direction (#2, #8, #10)
- T. Kura – production (#4)
- T-SK – production (#3, #8—10)

== Charts ==
=== Weekly charts ===
Chart (2012)	Peak position
Japanese Albums (Oricon)	1
Japanese Top Albums (Billboard)	1
South Korean Albums (Gaon)	36
South Korean Overseas Albums (Gaon)	5
Taiwanese Albums (G-Music)	5
Taiwanese East Asian Albums (G-Music)	1

=== Monthly charts ===
Chart (2012)	Peak position
Japanese Albums (Oricon)	1

=== Year-end charts ===
Chart (2012)	Position
Japanese Albums (Oricon)	11

== Certification and sales ==
Region	Certification	Certified units/sales
Japan (RIAJ)	Platinum	542,296

== Release history ==
Region	Date	Format	Distributing Label	Catalogue codes
Japan	June 27, 2012	CD, CD+DVD, playbutton	Avex Trax	AVCD-38523, AVCD-38522, AQZD-50725
Hong Kong	June 29, 2012	CD, CD+DVD	Avex Asia	AAJCD20103, AAJCD20102D
Taiwan	June 29, 2012	CD, CD+DVD	Avex Taiwan	AVJCD10510, AVJCD10510/A
South Korea	July 5, 2012	CD+DVD	S.M. Entertainment/KMP Holdings	SMKJT0189B
Japan	July 11, 2012	Digital download	Avex Trax	
Japan	July 14, 2012	Rental CD	Avex Trax	
Singapore	August 3, 2012	CD, CD+DVD	Universal Music	AAJCD20103, AAJCD20102D
Philippines	October 20, 2012	CD, CD+DVD	Universal Records (Philippines)	AAJCD20103, AAJCD20102D
