= Sit! Stay! Wait! Down!/Love Story =

"Sit! Stay! Wait! Down! / Love Story"
- CD only edition

Single by Namie Amuro

from the album Uncontrolled
- Released: December 7, 2011
- Genre: Pop; R&B; hip-pop; dance-pop; electropop
- Length: 29:08
- Label: Avex Trax
- Producers: Michico; T. Kura; Miriam Nervo; Olivia Nervo; T-SK; Tesung Kim; Nao'ymt

Namie Amuro singles chronology
"Naked/Fight Together/Tempest" (2011)	"Sit! Stay! Wait! Down! / Love Story" (2011)	"Go Round" (2012)

Alternative cover
- CD+DVD

"Sit! Stay! Wait! Down! / Love Story" is an extended play (marketed as a single) by Japanese recording artist Namie Amuro from her tenth studio album and debut bilingual album Uncontrolled (2012). The EP contains the songs "Sit! Stay! Wait! Down!" and "Love Story" from the parent album and two new tracks "Higher" and "Arigatou". The EP was produced by Michico, T. Kura, Miriam Nervo, Olivia Nervo, T-SK, Tesung Kim, and Nao'ymt, and is divided into two dance-pop songs and two pop ballads.

"Sit! Stay! Wait! Down!/Love Story" was released on December 7, 2011, through Avex Trax and received positive reviews from most music critics; many highlighted Amuro's vocals and the B-side "Higher", while some felt the rest of the songs were boring and outdated. Charted as a single on the Oricon Singles Chart, it reached number three and was certified gold by the Recording Industry Association of Japan (RIAJ). "Sit! Stay! Wait! Down!" and "Love Story" were released as the two lead singles and charted on the Japan Hot 100 at three and two, respectively.

== Background ==
"Love Story"
"Love Story is a power ballad with lyrics containing themes of love and heartbreak.

"Sit! Stay! Wait! Down!"
"Sit! Stay! Wait! Down!" is an upbeat R&B song that relates Amuro's lover to a dog.

This single was released approximately four months after Amuro's previous single "NAKED/Fight Together/Tempest". In addition to the two title tracks, two new songs were included as B-side tracks, making it her first single with four songs. This is also the first time since her 33rd single "Funky Town," released on April 4, 2007, that B-side songs have been included in one of her singles.

"Sit! Stay! Wait! Down!" and "Arigatou" were written by Michico and co-produced by T.kura, "Love Story" was written by Tiger and produced by T-SK, Tesung Kim and Nervo, and Japanese record producer Nao'ymt produced and wrote "Higher". "Love Story" was used as a theme song for the dorama The Reason I Can't Find My Love. "Arigatou" was used as the jingle for Kosé's Esprique TV commercial. On the release date of this song, a free download was also made available on Amuro's own official Facebook page for a limited time until April 2, 2012. "Higher" was performed on her Namie Amuro Live Style 2011 Japan arena tour. It was also broadcast in some areas as the commercial jingle for Coca-Cola Japan's Coca-Cola Zero.

"Sit! Stay! Wait! Down!" is a fast-paced R&B number with a jack-in-the-box structure; the song lyrically relates a significant other to a dog. "Love Story" is a power ballad with lyrics that express gratitude to someone you loved but broke up with. "Higher" is a techno-infused number with a tense electronic sound and powerful vocals. "Arigatou" is a mellow ballad with ethereal string sounds and a soft melody; it expresses gratitude to those who helped with reconstruction efforts after the 2011 Tōhoku earthquake and tsunami.

== Critical reception ==
"Sit! Stay! Wait! Down!/Love Story" received positive reviews from most music critics. David Cirone from J-Generation labelled the first single "sexy" and "tongue-in-cheek", while he commented on the latter single ""Love Story" are great ballads, featuring flawless and sincere vocals, just as memorable as some of the greats on Best Fiction." Cirone highlighted "Love Story" as a stand out from Uncontrolled. CDJournal.com praised the first two singles for its composition, calling "Sit! Stay! Wait! Down!" full of tension and "humorous" and liking Amuro's painful and sad vocals on "Love Story". The website also commended the latter two tracks, labelling "Higher" "full of tension" and a "thrilling electropop song" while calling "Arigatou" "beautiful".

However, Michael McCarthy from Otakudx.com had overall criticized the album's musical direction and lyrical content, but criticized the lyrics of "Sit! Stay! Wait! Down!" for its sexual innuendos and references to doggy style; he deemed it "ridiculous" and said "if a guy sang this song, talking to a girl like she was a dog, people would be outraged. But since Namie is a female we're supposed to take it as some brilliant role reversal or otherwise be turned on by it? Sorry, I just found it slightly disturbing and extremely boring." Random J from his online blog commended the first single's title for sounding "ridiculously cool and straight to the point." However, he pointed out the song's composition by stating "It sounds like shit we've all heard before and the chorus just sounds like a droned out mess until "Sit! Stay! Wait! Down!" gets chanted." He also praised the track "Higher" for its "high energy" and having a "stronger melody", but criticized "Love Story" and "Arigatou" for being boring. He awarded three stars out of ten, highlighting "Higher" as the best song but said the EP was one of her weakest singles in her career.

== Commercial response ==
"Sit! Stay! Wait! Down!/Love Story" charted as a single on the Oricon Singles Chart and peaked at number three, selling 77,758 copies in its first week. It dropped to number four the next week, selling 28,384 copies. The single stayed in the top ten one last week, ranking at number five and selling 21,110 copies. "Sit! Stay! Wait! Down!/Love Story" stayed in the singles charts for twenty weeks, becoming Amuro's longest charting single since "60s 70s 80s" in 2008 with twenty weeks. (Note: Although "Sit! Stay! Wait! Down!/Love Story" is recognized as an extended play with over four original songs and three additional instrumental tracks, it is registered as a single by Oricon.) The single sold over 162,000 units in Japan, her highest selling single since "60s 70s 80s" and remains her highest inside the 2010s. (Note: Sales provided by Oricon database and are rounded to the nearest thousand copies.) "Sit! Stay! Wait! Down!/Love Story" was certified gold by the Recording Industry Association of Japan (RIAJ) for exceeding 100,000 shipments in Japan.

"Love Story" was made available as a ringtone on November 2, 2011, and together with "Sit! Stay! Wait! Down!," it was the first song in the history of Recochoku to top the charts for two consecutive weeks, and it was ranked first place in the single download charts for the following year. It also ranked first for the year in the ringtone song and ringtone movie categories. "Love Story" was ranked number one for three consecutive months from December 2011 to February 2012 in the "LISMO Award Music Playback Ranking," which recognizes the most played songs on LISMO-compatible au mobile phones and smartphones that month. Amuro is the third to top the charts for three consecutive months in the history of the LISMO Award Music Playback Ranking. "Love Story" is the biggest-selling song she has released in the 2010s.

Both "Sit! Stay! Wait! Down!" and "Love Story" charted individually on the Japan Hot 100 and the RIAJ Digital Track Chart. "Sit! Stay! Wait! Down!" peaked at number three on the Japan Hot 100 chart and sixteen on the Japan Hot Airplay Chart, while "Love Story" reached number two and seven respectively. Both songs peaked at number one on the RIAJ Digital Track Chart, making Amuro the first artist to have both double a-side singles reach the top spot. "Sit! Stay! Wait! Down!" was certified platinum by RIAJ for digital sales of 250,000 units. "Love Story" was certified million for cell phone ringtone and digital shipments of one million units; this tallied to total sales of 3.6 million units including the physical shipment. "Love Story" became Amuro's first million-selling single since her 2007 single "Baby Don't Cry". (Note: "Love Story" was certified million for both ringtone and digital downloads; her last singles to reach million status for each format was "Baby Don't Cry" (ringtone), "How to Be a Girl" (physical) and "Love Story" being her first single to sell over one million digital units.)

== Accolades ==
"Love Story" received many forms of recognition: LISMO, an online music player provided by the cell phone company au, selected "Love Story" as the winner of LISMO Award; the karaoke company Daiichi Kosho announced that the song is the most popular Valentine's Day song for a female artist, along with Exile's "Lovers Again", while the song won "Song of the Year by Download" and second place for the Top 5 Downloaded songs at the annual 27th Japan Gold Disc Awards. On June 23, 2012, the video for "Love Story" won the "Best Female Video" award at the 2012 MTV Video Music Awards Japan; Amuro also won the "Best Collaboration Video" award for "Make It Happen" (a song from the best collaboration album Checkmate!).

== Music video ==
"Love Story" received a music video and was directed by Kensuke Kawamura. The video was shot in London and features scenes of Amuro walking down a street, sitting outside a café and inside a café. A teaser video was uploaded on Amuro's YouTube channel on March 18, 2012. The music video was featured on the DVD version of the single.

== Track listing ==
No.	Title	Lyrics	Music	Length
1.	"Sit! Stay! Wait! Down!"	Michico	T.kura, Michico	3:16
2.	"Love Story"	Tiger	T-SK, Tesung Kim, Olivia Nervo, Miriam Nervo	4:45
3.	"Higher"	Nao'ymt	Nao'ymt	4:29
4.	"Arigatou" (thank the world for LOVE... gift song for 2011)	Michico	T.kura, Michico	4:14
5.	"Sit! Stay! Wait! Down!" (Instrumental)		T.kura, Michico	3:15
6.	"Love Story" (Instrumental)		T-SK, Tesung Kim, Olivia Nervo, Miriam Nervo	4:45
7.	"Higher" (Instrumental)		Nao'ymt	4:27
Total length:				29:08

DVD
No.	Title	Length
1.	"Love Story" (Music video)

== Charts ==
=== Weekly charts ===
Weekly chart performance for "Sit!Stay!Wait!Down!/Love Story"
Chart (2011)	Peak position
Japan Singles (Oricon)	3
Japan Hot Singles Sales (Billboard)	2

Weekly chart performance for "Sit! Stay! Wait! Down!"
Chart (2011)	Peak position
Japan Hot 100 (Billboard)	3
Japan Airplay Chart	16

Weekly chart performance for "Love Story"
Chart (2011)	Peak position
Japan (Japan Hot 100)	2
Japan Airplay Chart	7
RIAJ Digital Track Chart	1

=== Year-end charts ===
Year-end chart performance for "Sit! Stay! Wait! Down!/Love Story"
Chart (2011)	Position
Japan Singles (Oricon)	99

Year-end chart performance for "Love Story"
Chart (2012)	Position
Japan Hot 100 (Billboard)	14

== Certification ==
Region	Certification	Certified units/sales
Japan (RIAJ) CD version.	Gold	100,000^{^}
Japan (RIAJ) Sit! Stay! Wait! Down! (digital)	Platinum	250,000^{*}
Japan (RIAJ) Love Story (digital)	Million	1,000,000^{*}
Japan (RIAJ) Love Story (ringtone)	Million	1,000,000^{*}
^{*} Sales figures based on certification alone.^{^} Shipments figures based on certification alone.
