= Héctor Muelas =

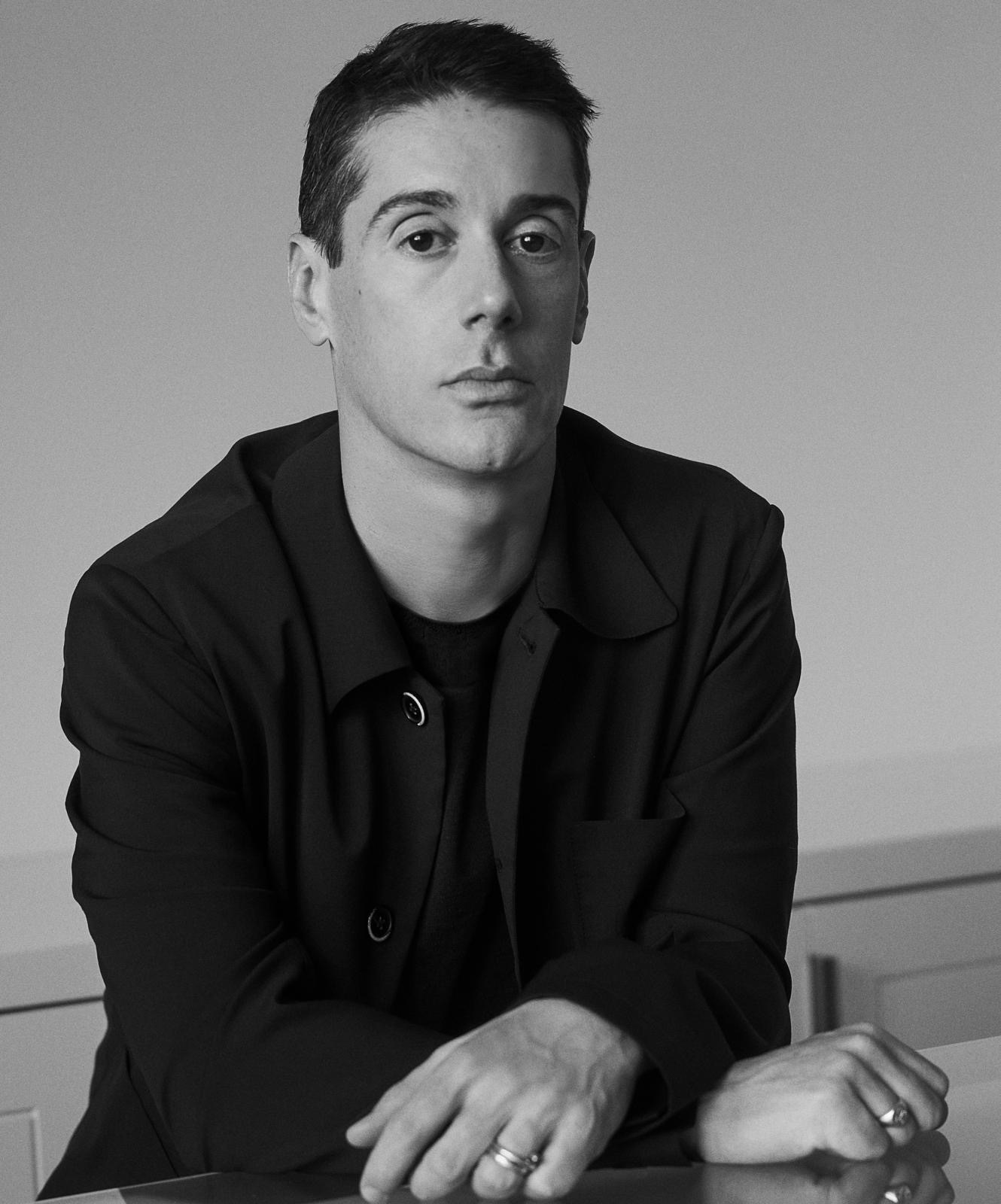
- Born: c. 1980; Barcelona, Spain
- Education: Universitat Pompeu Fabra
- Occupations: Creative executive, brand strategist
- Known for: Rebranding of Rimowa

Héctor Muelas (born c. 1980, Barcelona, Spain) is a Spanish creative executive and brand strategist. He has held senior creative and marketing roles in the technology, luxury, and travel industries, including at Apple Inc., LVMH, Expedia Group and Tiffany & Co. He led the rebranding of the luggage maker Rimowa after its acquisition by LVMH.

== Early life and education ==
Muelas was born and raised in Barcelona, Spain. He left Spain at the age of 20 to pursue his career internationally. He holds a Master's Degree in Audiovisual Communication from the Universitat Pompeu Fabra, Barcelona.

== Career ==
In 2002, Muelas began his professional life as a journalist. For approximately four years, he served as Editor-in-Chief and Creative Director of VICE Media in Germany, Austria, and Switzerland.

From 2007 to 2010, Muelas worked in advertising as a creative at Wieden+Kennedy's Amsterdam office, where he was part of teams whose work for Nike received industry awards.

In 2010, he held a creative executive position at CAA. From 2012 to 2015, Muelas was Creative Director of Worldwide Marketing and Communications at Apple, working on global advertising for the Apple Watch and the iPhone. He later returned to Apple as Group Global Creative Director, leaving in July 2021 to join Expedia Group.

Between 2015 and 2017, Muelas was Vice President of Content and Digital Creative at LVMH, where he worked across the group's brands, including on digital content for Céline under then-creative director Phoebe Philo.

In June 2017, Muelas was appointed Chief Brand Officer of Rimowa, following LVMH's 2016 acquisition of an 80% stake in the company for €640 million. In this role he oversaw a rebranding of Rimowa, including a new visual identity developed with the Munich-based design studio Bureau Borsche and the London-based consultancy Commission Studio.

In 2018, Rimowa marked its 120th anniversary with a campaign featuring Roger Federer, Nobu Matsuhisa, Virgil Abloh, designer Yoon Ahn, and model and activist Adwoa Aboah, who appeared in a series of short films on the theme of travel. During his tenure the company also produced collaborations with the streetwear label Supreme and with Virgil Abloh's Off-White.

In July 2021, Muelas joined Expedia Group as Senior Vice President of Global Marketing and Creative. In early 2022, Expedia Group made its first Super Bowl advertising appearance, with a spot for Vrbo produced with Wieden+Kennedy and an Expedia spot produced with Anomaly. In 2022, Muelas was named to the Adweek 50 list.

In 2023, Muelas joined Tiffany & Co., the American luxury jeweller owned by LVMH since 2021, as Chief Brand Creative Officer. During his tenure, Tiffany & Co. campaigns received industry awards, including at the Cannes Lions, the One Show, the D&AD Awards and the Webby Awards.

In 2025, Muelas was honoured at the Otis College of Art and Design's annual Atelier event. He has also served as a juror in the Luxury category at the Cannes Lions International Festival of Creativity.
