= Cream (Japanese group) =

Japanese hip hop group

- Genres: hip hop; pop; EDM
- Years active: 2010–present
- Label: Avex Trax
- Members: Minami, Staxx T
- Website: creamofficial.com

Cream is a Japanese hip hop group consisting of singer-songwriter Minami and rapper/track-maker Staxx T. Their musical style is influenced by hip-hop, pop, rock, and electronic dance music (EDM) -- which they collectively refer to as "new jpop." The group takes its name from a fusion of the words "creative" and "team". The group creates their music by having Minami compose a song's lyrics in English, after which point Staxx T translates it into Japanese.

== Biography ==
In 2010, they released "DJ Deckstream presents ICEKREAM SOUNDZ Vol. 1" which became #1 on iTunes Hip Hop Charts for four consecutive weeks. Since then, they have been releasing original content on their YouTube channel CREAM VISION. Their first album, DREAMIN' was released through Avex Group on January 23, 2013, with the lead single "Shooting Star" which ranked #1 on USEN HIT JPOP. The album was ranked #1 on iTunes Japan Top Song Chart and the duo performed a release tour with 29 performances in 24 cities.

In addition to their own work, both Minami and Staxx T actively compose lyrics and music for various artists. These artists include M-Flo, Namie Amuro, BoA, ICONIQ, V6 (band), and MADEMOISELLE YULIA.

=== Minami ===
Born in Hong Kong on February 9, 1989, but raised in Kobe, Japan, Minami Minami decided early that she wanted her career to center on her hobbies of either music or movies. She is bilingual in Japanese and English and sought every opportunity to sing and write songs. She was eventually discovered by M-flo's Verbal who has become her mentor. She continued to develop with Verbal's help and has written songs for a variety of artists.

=== Staxx T (Rapper) / T'Z BEETZ' (Track-maker) ===
Born and raised in Osaka Japan, Takuma Kitahashi (Staxx T) was interested in music from a young age. After being introduced to hip hop music at the age of 15, he performed live for the first time at the age of 17 when he discovered his passion as a musician. He soon began producing his own music and was featured in the hip hop magazine TIGHT. Aside from music, he also modeled for the hip hop fashion magazines including 411. In 2005 he entered a live battle contest hosted by DJ MASTERKEY and sponsored by Coca-Cola where he won first place in the MC/Vocal Department. His talent as a lyricist garnered him more attention as he began writing for a variety of other artists.

== Cream Vision ==
Beginning in 2011, the two began uploading videos onto their YouTube channel CREAM VISION weekly for two years and became one of Japan’s first artist to come out of YOUTUBE. Uploads include original songs, behind the scenes footage, live performances and cover songs remixed in Japanese. Their channel has garnered over 233,722,046 views and 263,000 subscribers and continues to grow.

== Discography ==
=== Albums ===
==== Dreamin' ====
Cream's debut album Dreamin' was released on January 23, 2013.

All tracks are written by Staxx T, Minami, John Fontein.

No.	Title	Writer(s)	Length
1.	"Intro"	John Fontein
2.	"Once In A Lifetime"	Staxx T, Minami
3.	"Kissing (flip side)"	Minami, John Fontein
4.	"Shooting Star"	Minami, John Fontein
5.	"Without You"	Minami, John Fontein
6.	"Nightmare"	Minami, John Fontein
7.	"Whatever feat. WISE & Tarantula"	Minami, John Fontein
8.	"Dreamin' (interlude)"	Gustav Holst
9.	"Dreamin'"	Staxx T, Minami, John Fontein
10.	"Me Cho Creamy"	Staxx T, Minami, John Fontein
11.	"Money Money Money"	Staxx T, Minami
12.	"Fireworks"	Minami, John Fontein
13.	"Runaway"	Minami, Major Dude, John Fontein
14.	"Goodbye"	Staxx T, Minami, John Fontein
15.	"Wait Your Turn"	Staxx T, Minami

==== #nofilter ====
Cream's second studio album #nofilter was released April 30, 2014.

No.	Title	Length
1.	"#nofilter"
2.	"Nobody"
3.	"Party Chakka-Men"
4.	"Just Like You"
5.	"Hobokano"
6.	"Beautiful"
7.	"Winner"
8.	"You Never Know"
9.	"Forever Young"
10.	"Wonderland"
11.	"Hurry Up"
12.	"Far Away"
13.	"See the Light"

==== Summer Mix 2014 ====
The Summer Mix was released on September 17, 2014.

No.	Title	Length
1.	"Stay"
2.	"Shooting Star"
3.	"Wonderland"
4.	"Whatever feat. WISE & Tarantula (Spontania)"
5.	"Me Cho Creamy"
6.	"Hurry Up"
7.	"Beautiful (TJO & YUSUKE from BLUSWING Remix)"
8.	"Forever Young"
9.	"#nofilter"
10.	"Hobokano (Bonus Track)"
