= Break It/Get Myself Back =

"Break It"
- "Break It" cover

Single by Namie Amuro

from the album Uncontrolled
- Released: July 28, 2010
- Recorded: 2010
- Genre: Pop
- Label: Avex Trax
- Songwriter: Nao'ymt
- Producer: Nao'ymt

Namie Amuro singles chronology
"Fake" (2010)	"Break It" (2010)	"Wonder Woman" (2011)

Alternative cover
- "Get Myself Back" cover

"Break It/Get Myself Back" is a double A-side single released by Japanese recording artist Namie Amuro. It was released on July 28, 2010, through Avex Trax. Break It was used in a Coca-Cola Zero commercial. The song reached number three on Oricon's weekly chart. The single has been certified Gold for shipment of 100,000 copies, as well as "Get Myself Back" being certified as a gold download to cellphones., it serves two lead singles for her tenth studio album Uncontrolled.

== Music video ==
The music video for "Get Myself Back" features Amuro in several different locations. She first appears on a beach standing ankle-deep in the water. Another location includes standing next to tree, and also in a large grassy field.

The music video for "Break It" consists of Amuro and back-up dancers in a techno-style building, and in parts of it, Amuro standing beside a motorbike.

== Track listing ==
All lyrics are written by Nao'ymt; all music is composed by Nao'ymt.

CD single / digital download
No.	Title	Length
1.	"Break It"	3:19
2.	"Get Myself Back"	4:31
3.	"Break It" (Instrumental)	3:19
4.	"Get Myself Back" (Instrumental)	4:32
Total length:		15:40

DVD
No.	Title	Length
1.	"Break It" (Music video)
2.	"Get Myself Back" (Music video)
3.	"Break It" (making of music video)
4.	"Get Myself Back" (making of music video)

== Charts ==
=== Weekly charts ===
Chart (2010)	Peak position
Japan (Japan Hot 100) "Get Myself Back"	2
Japan (Japan Hot 100) "Break It"	16
Japan (Oricon)	3
Taiwan (G-Music)	11
Taiwan East Asia (G-Music)	3

=== Year-end charts ===
Chart (2010)	Position
Japan (Oricon)	80

== Sales and certifications ==
Region	Certification	Certified units/sales
Japan (RIAJ) CD single	Gold	100,000^{^}
Japan (RIAJ) "Get Myself Back" ringtone	Gold	100,000^{*}
Japan (RIAJ) "Break It" digital download	Gold	100,000^{*}
^{*} Sales figures based on certification alone.^{^} Shipments figures based on certification alone.

== Credits ==
- Produced by Nao'ymt
- Written by Namie Amuro
- Mixed by D.O.I.
- Mastered by Tom Coyne
- Recorded by Ryousuke Kataoka
- Guitar by Shinji Omura (Tr. 1 & 3)
