= Crystal (Double album) =

Studio album by Double
- Released: June 2, 1999
- Recorded: 1998–1999
- Genres: J-pop, R&B
- Length: 54:20
- Label: For Life Music Entertainment

Double chronology
Crystal (1999)	Double (2000)

Singles from Crystal
- 1. "For Me" Released: February 4, 1998; 2. "Desire" Released: May 21, 1998; 3. "Bed" Released: October 21, 1998; 4. "Shake" Released: March 7, 1999

Crystal is the debut album by Japanese sister duo Double, released on June 2, 1999 by For Life Music Entertainment. The first press edition of the album came with the CD case with a clear background, and a back insert with the duo posing with the track names on the left side. Inside the case comes with a photobook with different pages consisting of red, orange, yellow, green, blue, and pink spelling Double letter by letter. The RIAJ has certified it 2× platinum, recognizing over 600,000+ shipments throughout Japan. On the Oricon charts, the album's peak position was number two.

== History ==
Double had previously released two singles without much success. Their debut single, "For Me" was a commercial failure, and their follow-up single, "Desire" failed to make a big impression with sales.

Their third single "Bed" gained some recognition in Japan and their fourth single "Shake" was their first successful single selling over 100,000 copies, becoming the only single to sell more than 100,000 copies. It would be their final single as a sister duo before Sachiko's death two months after the single's release.

On May 21, 1999, Sachiko suddenly died from a subarachnoid hemorrhage at the age of 25 just two weeks before their debut album was released. Takako was devastated by the loss of her sister and took a break from her music career.

== Track listing ==
All lyrics are written by Sachiko.

No.	Title	Music	Arranger(s)	Length
1.	"Intro ~ Crystal Clear"	Tatsuya.N		0:52
2.	"Free Style"	Ryosuke Imai	Takako, Sachiko	5:09
3.	"Little Things You Do"	Jett-Edwards	Aaron G, Sachiko	5:25
4.	"Make Me Happy (More Mix)"	Takako, Sachiko	Taku	5:43
5.	"Desire (Cool Groove Mix)"	福富幸宏	Sachiko	4:53
6.	"Interlude (If My Sister's In Trouble ~ Joy)"	David Barratt	William Cliff, Double	0:20
7.	"Shake (Original)"	Ryosuke Imai	Ryu, Double	5:31
8.	"Sweet Time"	Ryosuke Imai	Takako, Sachiko	5:12
9.	"For Me (Live Style Mix)"	福富幸宏	Sachiko	5:36
10.	"Bed"	Maestro-T	K. Matsuo, Double	5:17
11.	"Shake (Another Squall Mix)"	Zeebra For T.O.P	Ryosuke Imai	5:01
12.	"Bed (Doubles)"	Maestro-T	D. Sakama	5:21
Total length:				54:20

== Personnel ==
- Double – lead vocals, lyrics
- Sachiko Hirasawa – bass, chorus
- Ryosuke Imai – chorus
- Takako Hirasawa – vocal direction

=== Production ===
- Produced by Ryosuke Imai, Ryosuke Imai for For Life Music Entertainment
- Co-produced by Takako
- Executive Production by Maestro-T

== Charts ==
Oricon Sales Chart (Japan)

Release	Chart	Peak position	Sales total
June 2, 1999	Oricon Daily Albums Chart	2	
June 2, 1999	Oricon Weekly Albums Chart	2	636,440
