= Go Round (song) =

- "Go Round" DVD only cover.

Single by Namie Amuro

from the album Uncontrolled
- A-side: "Yeah-Oh"
- Released: March 21, 2012
- Recorded: 2012
- Genre: Electropop; dance-pop
- Length: 3:31
- Label: Avex Trax
- Songwriters: Aili, Tesung Kim, Nervo
- Producer: T-Sk

Namie Amuro singles chronology
"Sit! Stay! Wait! Down!/Love Story" (2011)	"Go Round" (2012)	"Damage" (2012)

"Go Round" (released with "Yeah-Oh" as "Go Round/Yeah-Oh") is a song by Japanese recording artist Namie Amuro from her tenth studio album Uncontrolled (2012). It was released as a double a-side single with another album track "Yeah-Oh" and was served as the fourth single on March 21, 2012 by Avex Trax. "Go Round" was written by Aili, produced by T-Sk and co-composed by Tesung Kim and Australian duo Nervo. With a cover sleeve, photographed by Takaki Kumada, showing Amuro in front of a blurry window pane, "Go Round" was recorded both in English and Japanese language and is a dance-pop song.

"Go Round" received mixed reviews from music critics, many of whom highlighted it from the Uncontrolled album and commended the composition while some felt the production and lyrics were generic and regressive. Charting in conjunction with "Yeah-Oh", the double a-side reached number four on the Japanese Oricon Singles Chart and was certified gold by the Recording Industry Association of Japan (RIAJ). Both songs charted on the Japan Hot 100 and the Taiwanese Singles Chart respectively, and were both certified gold for digital sales. For promotion, an accompanying music video was shot for the single and has been performed on two concert tours by Amuro.

== Background and release ==
"Go Round" was written by Aili, produced by T-Sk and co-composed by Tesung Kim and Australian duo Nervo. The song was recorded in early-2012 at Avex Studios in Tokyo, Japan by Ryosuke Kataoka. Both "Go Round" and "Yeah-Oh" are Amuro's first collaborations with Nervo, who later went on to compose "Hot Girls", "Love Story" and "Let's Go" from the album Uncontrolled (2012). Amuro recorded an English version of the track that featured on the parent album and was written by Nervo, while the Bilingual version was used as the single version. Musically, "Go Round" is an "uplifting" dance-pop and 80s electropop song.

"Go Round" was released as a double-aside with another album track "Yeah-Oh" on March 21, 2012 in CD, DVD and digital format by Avex Trax, as the fourth and final single for the singer's tenth studio album Uncontrolled. The cover sleeve features two shots of Amuro in front of a blurry window pane; the first for "Go Round" with her wearing a white dress, and the second being for "Yeah-Oh" with a black skirt and white sleeve T-shirt on. The digital EP uses the "Go Round" DVD cover, featuring the instrumental edits of both songs on all three formats, and the DVD version includes the music videos to both songs.

== Critical reception ==
"Go Round" received mixed reviews from most music critics. Tetsuo Hiraga was positive towards the track, commending the "thick violent beat" and her softer vocals. He later labelled the track "cool and sweet". As a double a-side single, he concluded that her vocals and sound were "monumental". David Cirone from J-Generation commended the composition, but criticized the English versions by explaining, "The album’s one disappointing move is the re-recording (re-English-ing) of the double-A-single 'Go Round/Yeah-Oh'. Both songs contained a beautiful blend of English/Japanese in their original release a few months prior, but on the 'album version' they’ve gone full-English, and it’s a step backwards. Amuro’s delivery is solid enough to keep it together, but the re-worked lyrics bring the song down to junior-high level."

Toz from Selective Hearing was mixed in his review, stating "Go Round" is the song with the lesser amount of electro-pop. While it’s not my favourite Namie song, she sounds much more comfortable on this electro-pop bed than previously heard. But, it does sound a bit too lackluster, which could lose a few people." However, Michael McCarthy was critical towards the lyrics and composition, labelling them "bland" and found the composition "random dance pop" and not "impressive".

== Commercial performance ==
Charting in conjunction with "Yeah-Oh", "Go Round/Yeah-Oh" entered and peaked at number four on the Japanese Oricon Singles Chart, her lowest charting single since 2005 single "White Light/Violet Sauce" at seven. The a-side single stayed in the charts for nine weeks, becoming her shortest spanning single in the charts since her 2007 single "Funky Town" with seven weeks. The single sold over 65,000 units in Japan, becoming her lowest selling single since "Funky Town" but were both surpassed by her 2012 single "Big Boys Cry/Beautiful" with 32,000 units sold in Japan. (Note: Sales provided by Oricon database and are rounded to the nearest thousand copies.) "Go Round/Yeah-Oh" was certified gold by the Recording Industry Association of Japan (RIAJ) for shipments of 100,000 units in Japan. Both "Go Round" and "Yeah-Oh" charted individually on the Japan Hot 100 chart at two and thirty-four respectively; "Go Round" was certified gold by the RIAJ for digital sales of 100,000 units.

== Promotion and other usage ==
Shigeaki Kubo directed the accompanying music video, which featured Amuro in a black and white tuxedo and in a white dress, inside of a diary locket and a cubic maze. The music video was included on the DVD version of both the A-side format and Uncontrolled. Amuro uploaded a teaser video of "Go Round" on her YouTube channel on March 15, 2012, alongside two additional television commercials promoting both "Go Round" and "Yeah-Oh".

"Go Round" was used as the TV commercial theme song for Japanese cosmetic company Kosee for their launch of Esprique lipstick. "Go Round" has been included in two of Amuro's live Japanese tours concert: 5 Major Domes Tour 2012 - 20th Anniversary Best and Namie Amuro Feel Tour 2013.

== Formats and track listings ==
These are the formats and track listings of major single releases of "Go Round/Yeah-Oh".

- "CD Single and digital download"
1. "Go Round" — 3:31
2. "Yeah-Oh" — 3:26
3. "Go Round" (Instrumental) — 3:31
4. "Yeah-Oh" (Instrumental) — 3:26
- "CD and DVD bundle"
1. "Go Round" — 3:31
2. "Yeah-Oh" — 3:26
3. "Go Round" (Instrumental) — 3:31
4. "Yeah-Oh" (Instrumental) — 3:26
5. "Go Round" (music video)
6. "Yeah-Oh" (music video)

== Personnel ==
- Namie Amuro – vocals
- T-Sk – composition, production
- Tesung Kim – composition
- Olivia Nervo – composition
- Miriam Nervo – composition
- Aili – songwriting
- Hide Kawada – music direction
- Susumu Isa – vocal direction
- Recorded by Ryosuke Kataoka at Avex Studio, Tokyo, Japan

Credits adapted from the promotional CD single.

== Charts, peaks and positions ==
=== Charts ===
Chart (2012)	Peak position
Japan Daily Chart (Oricon)	2
Japan Weekly Chart (Oricon)	4
Japan Hot 100 (Billboard)	2
Taiwanese Eastern Asian Weekly Chart (G-Music)	5

=== Certification ===
Region	Certification	Certified units/sales
Japan (RIAJ) CD/DVD version	Gold	100,000^{^}
Japan (RIAJ) Go Round (digital)	Gold	100,000^{*}
^{*} Sales figures based on certification alone.^{^} Shipments figures based on certification alone.
