= Vision (Double album) =

Studio album by Double
- Released: October 9, 2002
- Recorded: 2001
- Genres: R&B; J-pop
- Length: 54:50
- Label: For Life

Double chronology
Double (2000)	Vision (2002)	Re:Vision (2002)

Singles from Vision
- 1. "Driving All Night" / "You Got To" Released: June 5, 2002; 2. "Who's That Girl" Released: September 4, 2002

Vision (stylized VISION) is the third studio album by Japanese singer Double. It was released on October 9, 2002, under For Life Music. It peaked at number three on Oricon and charted for sixteen weeks.

== Overview ==
Vision was her first original album in two years. While her previous self-titled album, Double, featured international producers, Vision's production was handled by Japanese producers. The album features collaborations from Heartsdales, Hiro from Full Of Harmony, and S-WORD.

A review from CDJournal praised the album's sound, calling it "cool" and complementing the mix of languages.

== Singles ==
Two singles were released off the album, with "Driving All Night/You Got To" charting at number 6, and "Who's That Girl" peaking at number 9.

== Track listing ==
All music is composed by Takako Hirasawa.

No.	Title	Writer(s)	Length
1.	"Double" (Intro)	Pisces	1:13
2.	"Don't Rush"	Takako Hirasawa	3:53
3.	"Should Have Tried" (featuring Heartsdales)	Heartsdales, Hirasawa, DJ Watarai	4:42
4.	"Party Time"	Markee, RYU, Hirasawa	4:10
5.	"Just Who's That" (Interlude)		0:22
6.	"Who's That Girl"	Markee, Hirasawa	4:32
7.	"Strange Things"	Audrey Martells, Vini Miranda, Hirasawa, Warren J. McRae	4:50
8.	"ABC"	Ryosuke Imai, Hirasawa	4:18
9.	"Love" (Interlude)		1:31
10.	"You Got To"	DJ Watarai, Hirasawa	4:39
11.	"Let's Get Together" (duet with Hiro from Full Of Harmony)	Hiro, Angela Johnson, Hirasawa	4:41
12.	"Kissing You"	Johnson, Hirasawa	3:43
13.	"Midnight All Alone" (Interlude)		0:20
14.	"Driving All Night"	Imai, Hirasawa, Janice Marie Johnson, Perry L. Kibble	4:41
15.	"Going On" (Outro)		2:16
16.	"You Got To (Part 2)" (featuring S-WORD)	DJ Watarai, S-Word, Hirasawa	4:59
Total length:			54:50

Notes

- "Double (Intro)" is stylized as "D.O.U.B.L.E ~ intro"
- "Just Who's That (Interlude)" is stylized as "Just Who's That ~ interlude"
- "Love (Interlude)" is stylized as "Love ~ interlude"
- "Midnight All Alone (Interlude)" is stylized as "Midnight All Alone ~ interlude"
- "Going On (Outro)" is stylized as "Going On ~ outro"
- "You Got To (Part 2)" is stylized as "You Got To PART 2"
- "Driving All Night" contains a sample of "Boogie Oogie Oogie" by A Taste of Honey.

== Charts ==
Chart performance for Vision
Chart (2002)	Peak position
Japanese Albums (Oricon)	3

== Certifications ==
Region	Certification	Certified units/sales
Japan (RIAJ)	Platinum	250,000

== Release history ==
Date	Edition(s)	Format(s)	Label	Ref
October 9, 2002	Standard	CD	For Life Music Entertainment	
May 24, 2015	Standard	Digital Download	For Life Music Entertainment	

== Personnel ==
Adapted from liner notes booklet.

- Mastering: Tetsuya Yamamoto
- Recording: Haruna Takahashi
- Background Vocals: Keith R. Haines (Tracks 1, 15)
- Hair & Makeup: Akemi Ono
- Art Direction: Daisuke Suzuki
- Photography: Shinsuke Ohtsubo
- Styling: WAKANA
- A&R: Kazuhiro Imanari
- Executive Producers: Yutaka Goto, Masayuki Yanagisawa, Masaji Asakawa
