= Mademoiselle Yulia =

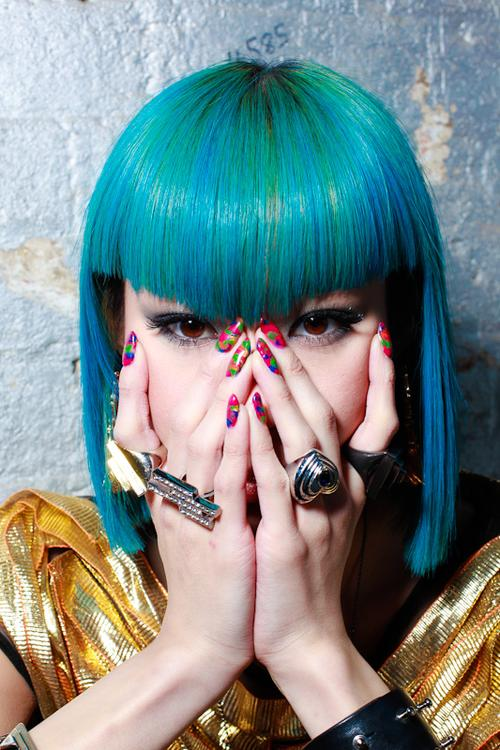

Background information
- Also known as: Mlle Yulia
- Born
- Origin: Tokyo, Japan
- Genres: Dance; electropop; pop rap
- Occupations: Disc jockey; singer; columnist; designer; socialite
- Years active: 2008–present
- Label: EMI Music Japan
- Website: mademoiselleyulia.com

Mademoiselle Yulia (マドモアゼル・ユリア, Mademoazeru Yuria) (born in Tokyo, stylized as MADEMOISELLE YULIA) is a Japanese DJ and musician, associated with Tokyo electro scene. She debuted in 2008 as a DJ, and in 2011 as a singer, with her debut album Mademoworld.

== Biography ==
Mademoiselle Yulia was born in Tokyo. In high school, she began her musical career as the lead vocalist and guitarist for six years. The four member band performed punk, technopop and garage covers, taking inspiration from The Clash and Kraftwerk.

Yulia began organising parties in her second year at high school, in 2005. She was inspired to create her own electro DJ event in Tokyo called Neon Spread, after attending a similar DJ night in England. In 2008 she was signed to EMI Music Japan and released her debut mix-tape of the electro music featured in the events, Neon Spread. Mademoiselle Yulia began regularly attending DJ events and parties 2008, and met M-Flo rapper Verbal as they would often attend the same events. In late 2008 and 2009 she began to be featured on many albums as a collaborating artist, with many of these releases featuring Verbal. These songs included appearances on Teriyaki Boyz' second album Serious Japanese, Towa Tei's album Big Fun, and a solo track of hers produced by Verbal, "What Now?," featured on M-Flo's third outside collaborations album M-Flo Inside: Works Best III.

Mademoiselle Yulia was the featured vocalist for the come-back tour of 1970s/1980s Japanese techno band Plastics, on their May 2010 tour. She was listed as the number two "to watch" talent in Tokyo by CNNGo in 2010.

In mid-2011, preparations for her debut album Mademoworld began, beginning a worldwide tour Angee Yung Robotz in April with Verbal to promote the album, as well as Verbal's solo album Visionair. Verbal is the executive producer of her album, and the first single "Gimme Gimme" was released digitally on August 3, 2011. The album was released digitally on iTunes on September 21, followed by a CD release on October 5.

Mademoiselle Yulia will collaborate with M-Flo on their comeback song "Run," which is being used for sports shoe brand Reebok's Reethem & Lite campaign in Japan. The trio first performed the song at the launch party for the campaign, on September 15, 2011.

She has performed in concerts and DJ events with artists such as Towa Tei, M.I.A., Dexpistols, Shinichi Osawa and Boys Noize. Outside of music, she writes as a columnist in fashion magazine Nylon's Japanese edition, designed jewellery for accessory brand Giza and briefly hosted a show on music channel Space Shower, Mademoworld.

== Discography ==
=== Studio albums ===
Year	Album Information	Oricon albums charts	Sales
2011	Mademoworld: Released: September 21, 2011; Label: EMI Music Japan (TOCT-28014)	142	1,200
2013	Whatever Harajuku: Released: September 18, 2013; Label: Universal Japan (TOCT-29188)	-	-

=== Mix tapes ===
Year	Album Information	Oricon albums charts	Sales
2008	Neon Spread: Released: August 27, 2008; Label: EMI Music Japan (TOCP-64363)	200	2,200
2009	Neon Spread 2: Released: August 26, 2009; Label: EMI (TOCP-64377)	106	2,800
2012	Neon Spread 3: Released: April 25, 2012; Label: EMI Music Japan	-	-

=== Singles ===
Release	Title	Notes	Chart positions		Album
Release	Title	Notes	Billboard Japan Hot 100	RIAJ digital tracks	Album
2011	"Gimme Gimme"	Digital download	40	TBA	Mademoworld
2011	"Bam Me"	Digital download	—	TBA	Mademoworld

=== Other appearances ===
Release	Artist	Title	Notes	Album
2008	Dexpistols featuring Verbal & Mademoiselle Yulia	"Saturdays"	De La Soul cover	Rock Trax presents Lesson.05 "Saturdays"
2009	Teriyaki Boyz feat. Mademoiselle Yulia	"After 5 (A.M.)"		Serious Japanese
2009	Towa Tei feat. Mademoiselle Yulia & Verbal	"Y.O.R."		Big Fun
2009	Mademoiselle Yulia feat. Verbal	"What Now?"		M-Flo Inside: Works Best III
2009	Krazy Baldhead feat. Big-O & Yulia	"Katana Powa"		Sweet Night
2010	Uffie feat. Mademoiselle Yulia	"MCs Can Kiss" (DSL Remix)		
2011	Verbal feat. Mademoiselle Yulia	"Liar"		Visionair
2012	will.i.am feat. Mademoiselle Yulia	"Blow Your Mind"	Part of the Ultrabook Project	
2013	CL of 2NE1	"The Baddest Female"	Appearance in music video	"The Baddest Female" (Digital Single)
2014	Basement Jaxx feat. Mademoiselle Yulia	"Oh Dear, I'm Falling in Love with You"		Junto
