= Mademoworld =

Studio album by Mademoiselle Yulia
- Released: September 21, 2011
- Genre: Electronica; J-pop
- Length: 45:06 Minutes
- Label: EMI Music Japan (TOCT-28014)
- Producer: Mademoiselle Yulia; VERBAL; John Fontein

Singles from Mademoworld
- 1. "Gimme Gimme" Released: July 29, 2011; 2. "Bam Me" Released: September 14, 2011

Mademoworld is the debut studio album by Japanese DJ and musician Mademoiselle Yulia, first released digitally on September 21, 2011. In mid-2011, preparations for the album began; beginning a world wide tour Angee Yung Robotz in April with VERBAL to promote the album, as well as VERBAL's solo album Visionair. The first single "Gimme Gimme" was released digitally on July 29, 2011 and the second, "Bam Me", was released on September 14. The album was released digitally on iTunes on September 21, followed by a physical CD release on October 5, 2011.

== Track listing ==
No.	Title	Length
1.	"Gimme Gimme"	3:47
2.	"Bam Me"	2:22
3.	"Luxury Of You"	3:14
4.	"Wao (feat. VERBAL)"	4:11
5.	"Down Down"	3:34
6.	"Zodiac Gold"	3:55
7.	"Replay"	3:02
8.	"You Can't Have Me That Way"	4:14
9.	"Chronic"	4:07
10.	"Midnight Express"	4:47
11.	"Don't Stop The Music"	4:14
12.	"Touch Me"	4:14

== Personnel ==
- Mademoiselle Yulia – main artist, vocals
- VERBAL – lyrics, production
- John Fontein – mastering, production, music producer

== Charts ==
Oricon Albums Chart	Sales
142	1,200

=== Singles ===
Release	Title	Notes	Chart positions	Album
Release	Title	Notes	Billboard Japan Hot 100	Album
2011	"Gimme Gimme"	Digital download	40	Mademoworld
2011	"Bam Me"	Digital download	—	Mademoworld
