= Yoon Ahn =

American businesswomen and fashion designer

- Education: Boston University
- Occupations: Businesswoman; fashion designer
- Years active: 2006–present
- Labels: Ambush; Nike Women's Global Curator; Dior Men (2018-2022)
- Spouse: Ryu Yeong-gi (m. 2004)

Yoon Ahn is an American businesswoman and fashion designer. She studied graphic design at Boston University and graduated in 2000. She is known as the creative director of her brand Ambush and as Dior Men's jewelry design director. Ahn is currently based in Tokyo, Japan.

== Biography ==
In 2002, Ahn co-founded the Ambush Design Company, a creative design organization where she created original album covers for her co-founder, Verbal, and other performing artists. In 2003, Ahn moved to Tokyo. In 2006, Ahn co-founded jewelry brand Antonio Murphy & Astro. She designed couture jewelry and accessory pieces for hip-hop contemporaries under the Antonio Murphy & Astro line.

Ahn started to gain recognition within the fashion industry as mainstream celebrities such Kanye West donned her AMBUSH 'POW!' pendant. Through such connections, Ahn was introduced to other designers including Virgil Abloh and Kim Jones. In 2012, Ahn and Verbal officially launched their joint high fashion jewelry label Ambush. In 2018, Ahn was appointed as the new Dior Men jewelry line director by then Dior creative director Kim Jones. She made her official debut at the Spring/Summer Paris men's fashion week.

Ahn has stated that she does not have a unique fashion genre that she adheres to. Her fascination with pop art references can be seen throughout her designs for both Ambush and Dior Men. Bold, gold, and/or metal jewelry mixed with themes referencing American and Tokyo hip-hop fashion styles remain consistent within her avant-garde designs.

== Background ==
Ahn's father was in the military and her family moved often within the United States and abroad. She spent most of her childhood in Seattle. Ahn first became fascinated with the fashion industry while perusing mainstream fashion magazines while working part-time at her local public library. She became interested in the New York downtown fashion scene through these magazines before later deciding to commit to a graphic design major. Despite having no traditional training in fashion design, Ahn rose in the ranks of the fashion world through her design background and the experiences garnered through high-profile connections and friendships. While working on Ambush with her co-founder, Verbal, in Japan, Ahn handled the PR side of the business for the label Billionaire Boys Club, a streetwear brand founded by Pharrell Williams and Nigo. During that time (2008–2011), she worked with Williams and Kim Jones while executing her Ambush collaboration with Louis Vuitton in the making of Playbutton, Ahn designed a wearable music player. In addition to acting as creative director of Ambush, Ahn continues to operate as a member of her creative consultancy alongside her co-founder, having partnered up and collaborated in the past with brands and e-commence businesses like Beats by Dre.

== Ambush ==
Ambush, before officially debuting in 2012, gained initial international attention from the famous Ambush "Pow!" pendant. Ambush became an immediate success soon after its official launch. Jewelry designs often include heavy and bold motifs as seen in the brand's collection of gold chainmail accessories and line of earrings re-inspired from everyday objects. A year after its initial launch, Ahn's Ambush began partnering with brands such as A Bathing Ape and later with Reebok. After launching in 2008, Ambush collaborated with A Bathing Ape in creating the Kaiju "Strange Beast" Collection. The collection featured a line of clothing, accessories, and footwear that featured Japanese-inspired designs of the classic A Bathing Ape half-shark, half-alligator prints along with Ahn and Verbal's experimental fashion influences. As creative director, Ahn often designs new pieces to fit within Ambush seasonal themes, as seen in their "Nomad" collection. Starting in 2012, Ambush collaborated with international brand Reebok where the brand released two special designs of the classic Reebok Pump Fury HLS sneakers. While the brand initially started as a couture jewelry line, Ambush expanded its couture offerings to encompass unisex high-fashion streetwear that complemented the line's jewelry in 2015. In that same year, the brand premiered its autumn/winter 2015 collection internationally for the first time in Hong Kong and Paris. In 2015, Ahn and Verbal simultaneously debuted on the Business of Fashion's list for the Top 500 People Influencing the Fashion Industry for 4 more years following their initial ranking in 2015. In the following year, Ambush debuted its first flagship store in Tokyo. In 2017, Ambush was one of the final top 8 contestants in the competition for the LVMH Prize. In 2018, Ambush made a runway debut at Amazon Fashion Week Tokyo.

Ambush collaborated with a number of brands, such as Gentle Monster, Bulgari, Sacai, and Converse.

Ambush brand operates 5 stores, all located in Japan.

== Dior Men (2018-2022) ==
Ahn was appointed as the Dior Men jewelry director in 2018 by Kim Jones, who served as Dior's creative director at the time. Her initial jewelry design showcases for Dior were at the pre-Fall show in 2018 and the Spring/Summer 2019 show. When speaking about the themes of the pre-Fall show premiering in Tokyo, Ahn stated "It will be very Japanese, but very Dior and very futuristic." At the SS19 Dior Men show in Paris, Ahn walked the Dior x Kaws-inspired runway with Jones where they both made their Dior debuts.

== Collaborations ==
Yoon Ahn, under her brand Ambush, has collaborated with multiple brands, including A Bathing Ape, Nike, Off-White, Louis Vuitton, Dr. Martens, Sacai, and Colette. In 2015, Ahn made an appearance in ASAP Rocky's "L$D" music video.

Following a number of Ambush x Nike Dunk High colorways, the partnership continued with an iterations of the Air Adjust Force "White/Black." Apart from design duties, in 2023 she appeared in a Nike campaign alongside Feng Chen Wang, Megan Thee Stallion and Parris Goebel.

In June 2022, Ambush and Zellerfeld have united to fashion a brand new 3D-printed 100S Clog that is being released both in physical form as well as an NFT.

In 2026, Ambush co-founders Yoon Ahn and Verbal collaborated with Swiss watchmaker Audemars Piguet on a limited-edition Royal Oak Concept watch.

== Awards and honors ==
- Ambush's Verbal & Yoon on the Hypebeast 100 — 2014–2017
- Ambush's Verbal & Yoon Ahn on Business of Fashion 500 — October 2016 -2023
- Yoon Ahn listed Vogue Japan's Rising Star of 2017
- Yoon and Verbal listed on Vogue Forces of Fashion
