= Naked/Fight Together/Tempest =

"Naked / Fight Together / Tempest"

Single by Namie Amuro

from the album Uncontrolled
- Released: July 27, 2011
- Length: 4:23 ("Naked"); 04:19 ("Fight Together"); 04:38 ("Tempest")
- Label: Avex Trax
- Songwriter(s): Shinichi Osawa; Verbal; Nao'ymt
- Producer(s): Shinichi Osawa; Nao'ymt

Namie Amuro singles chronology
"Make It Happen" (2011)	"Naked / Fight Together / Tempest" (2011)	"Sit! Stay! Wait! Down! / Love Story" (2011)

Alternative cover

"Naked / Fight Together / Tempest" is a triple A-side single by Japanese recording artist, Namie Amuro. It was released on July 24, 2011, through Avex Trax. The single peaked at number 2 on the Oricon charts.

== Track listing ==
CD
No.	Title	Lyrics	Music	Arranger(s)	Length
1.	"Naked"	Verbal	Shinichi Osawa	Shinichi Osawa	4:23
2.	"Fight Together"	Nao'ymt	Nao'ymt	Nao'ymt	4:19
3.	"Tempest"	Nao'ymt	Nao'ymt	Nao'ymt	4:38
4.	"Naked" (Extended instrumental)
5.	"Fight Together" (Instrumental)
6.	"Tempest" (Instrumental)

DVD: Music videos
No.	Title	Length
1.	"Naked"
2.	"Tempest" (Music video)

== Charts ==
Chart (2011)	Peak position
Japanese Singles Chart	2

=== "Naked" ===
Chart (2011)	Peak position
Billboard Japan Hot 100	2
RIAJ Digital Track Chart	11

=== "Fight Together" ===
Chart (2011)	Peak position
Billboard Japan Hot 100	16
RIAJ Digital Track Chart	1

=== "Tempest" ===
Chart (2011)	Peak position
RIAJ Digital Track Chart	76
