= The Reason I Can't Find My Love =

- Genre: Romantic comedy
- Starring: Karina Nose; Yuriko Yoshitaka; Yuko Oshima; Izumi Inamori
- Country of origin: Japan
- Original language: Japanese

Original release
- Network: Fuji TV
- Release: October 17 – December 19, 2011

The Reason I Can't Find My Love (私が恋愛できない理由, Watashi ga Ren'ai Dekinai Riyū) is a Japanese romantic comedy television drama series that aired from 17 October to 19 December 2011. It was broadcast at 21:00 every Monday on Fuji TV (CX). The Chinese name is "我不能戀愛的理由" (Wǒ bù néng liàn ài de lǐ yóu).

== Cast ==
- Karina Nose as Emi Fujii
- Yuriko Yoshitaka as Saki Ogura
- Yuko Oshima (AKB48) as Mako Hanzawa
- Izumi Inamori
- Kei Tanaka
- Kana Kurashina
- Akiyoshi Nakao
- Seira Kagami
- Ryū Nakamura
- Ayame Goriki
- Masanobu Katsumura
- Masato Hagiwara

== Introduction ==
Over half of women in their twenties and thirties say that they do not have a boyfriend. Nowadays, women are faced with issues such as men, work, sex, family, etc. That is an ice age of love. The Reason I Can't Find My Love highlights the romances of three different women.

Emi is a lighting technician in a lighting company. Because she is always working with men, she comes to behave like a boy. She is not interested in fashion or other things that girls usually care about. She does not fall in love with someone because she thinks love is tiresome. But she actually still loves her ex-boyfriend who is her colleague in the same company.

Mako is an earnest office worker. She is rather clumsy and afraid of falling in love with someone. She didn't have sex with any boy before she fell in love with one colleague.

Saki is a beautiful and prideful girl. She hopes to be a journalist but she does not realize her dream. So she has to be a hostess in a bar to help support her family. She tells her family members that she was working in a large publisher house and earned a lot of money every month. She has met a kind and helpful man who is married and fallen in love with him.

== Audience ratings ==
Episode	Date	ratings
01	Oct. 17	17.0%
02	Oct. 24	15.7%
03	Oct. 31	14.8%
04	Nov. 7	16.1%
05	Nov. 14	14.8%
06	Nov. 21	15.4%
07	Nov. 28	15.6%
08	Dec. 5	14.8%
09	Dec. 12	15.3%
10	Dec. 19	?%

== Theme songs ==
- Love Story <Amuro Namie (安室奈美惠)
- Sit! Stay! Wait! Down! (Amuro Namie 安室奈美惠)
