= Double (singer) =

Japanese R&B singer (born 1975)

- Also known as: DJ Lilly
- Born: Takako Hirasawa (平澤貴子); March 14, 1975 (age 51)
- Origin: Niigata, Japan
- Genres: Contemporary R&B; hip-hop; pop
- Occupations: Singer-songwriter; music producer; deejay
- Years active: 1995–present
- Label: For Life Music Entertainment
- Past members: Sachiko Hirasawa (平澤幸子, Hirasawa Sachiko)
- Website: DOUBLE GROOVE SITE

Double is the stage name for Japanese R&B singer Takako Hirasawa (平澤貴子, Hirasawa Takako) (born March 14, 1975). Double used to be the name for the two member R&B group consisting of Takako and her sister Sachiko (1973 - 1999). After the death of Sachiko, Takako started her solo career adopting Double as her stage name. Double has been titled as the "Queen of R&B" and is considered to be a pioneer for being the first artist to bring American-style R&B to Japan.

== History ==
=== Early life and musical interest ===
Takako Hirasawa was born in Niigata, Japan. After her older sister Sachiko came back from a trip to America, she introduced Takako to R&B. Inspired by the 1992 video to Real Love, the two sisters decided to enter the music business as R&B artists. The duo began by performing at the US Yokota Air Base in Fussa, Tokyo.

=== Music career ===
On February 4, 1998, Double made their debut as a duo. They released the single, "For Me", which debuted on the Oricon chart at #89. They released three more singles, "Desire", "Bed" (both 1998) and "Shake" (1999). "Shake" was the duo's highest charting single, peaking at #21.

Before the release of their debut album Crystal, Sachiko died suddenly from a brain hemorrhage in May 1999. In June, Crystal was released and made its debut at #2. One of the first major successes for modern R&B in Japan it is considered a major influence paving the way for later acts such as Crystal Kay, Ai and a re-styled Namie Amuro.

After the death of her sister, Double went on a hiatus and returned to the music industry in June 2000. Retaining the stage name, Double released her first solo single, "U", which came in at #29 and had a video produced by Brian Alexander Morgan (Usher, Mariah Carey). She released one more single, "Angel", before releasing her eponymous debut solo album, Double, which peaked #13. Double later released an English version of the album, Double (Eng Ver.), which debuted at #30.

In 2004 Double completed a personal ambition to record a Jazz album, titled "Life is Beautiful" in which she teamed up with leading Japanese producers m-flo.

In 2007 for her album "Reflex", Double teamed up with US Hip-Hop trio De La Soul for "Say I Gotta Believe," and with American rapper Ak'Sent for "We International."

Throughout her career Double has shown a strong sexuality through her image, cover art and videos, something not usually associated with Japanese artists. She has put this down to her influence from Madonna and has stated that she feels natural to present herself as sexy even if music buyers feel shy to pick up her CDs.

Double has also made a point to avoid appearing on TV shows and remain out of the limelight, performing live only sporadically. She has confessed to being nervous about performing live due to being a perfectionist that can't undo things on stage, thus preferring the studio.

To commemorate her tenth anniversary, Double released her first greatest hits album, 10 Years Best We R&B, which debuted at #2. Double also released her first collaboration album, The Best Collaborations, which like her previous album debuted at #2, selling 63,413 in its first week. The album featured a new song, "Black Diamond", with the "Queen of Hip-Pop" Namie Amuro and the two performed the track at the finale of Double's 2008 live tour at Tokyo's Studio Coast, whilst also appearing together at the 2008 MTV Video Music Awards Japan.

In 2024, the track "Strange Things" from her 2002 album "Vision" has gone viral on social media, gaining attention in western countries like the USA, Canada, and Brazil.

== Trivia ==
Double originally thought her career would be in the beauty industry as a makeup artist or hairdresser, if she did not pursue a career as a singer.

== Discography ==
=== Studio albums ===
- Crystal (1999)
- Double (2000)
- Vision (2002)
- Wonderful (2003)
- Life is Beautiful (2004)
- Reflex (2007)
- Woman (2011)
