= Verbal (rapper) =

Zainichi Korean rapper (born 1975)

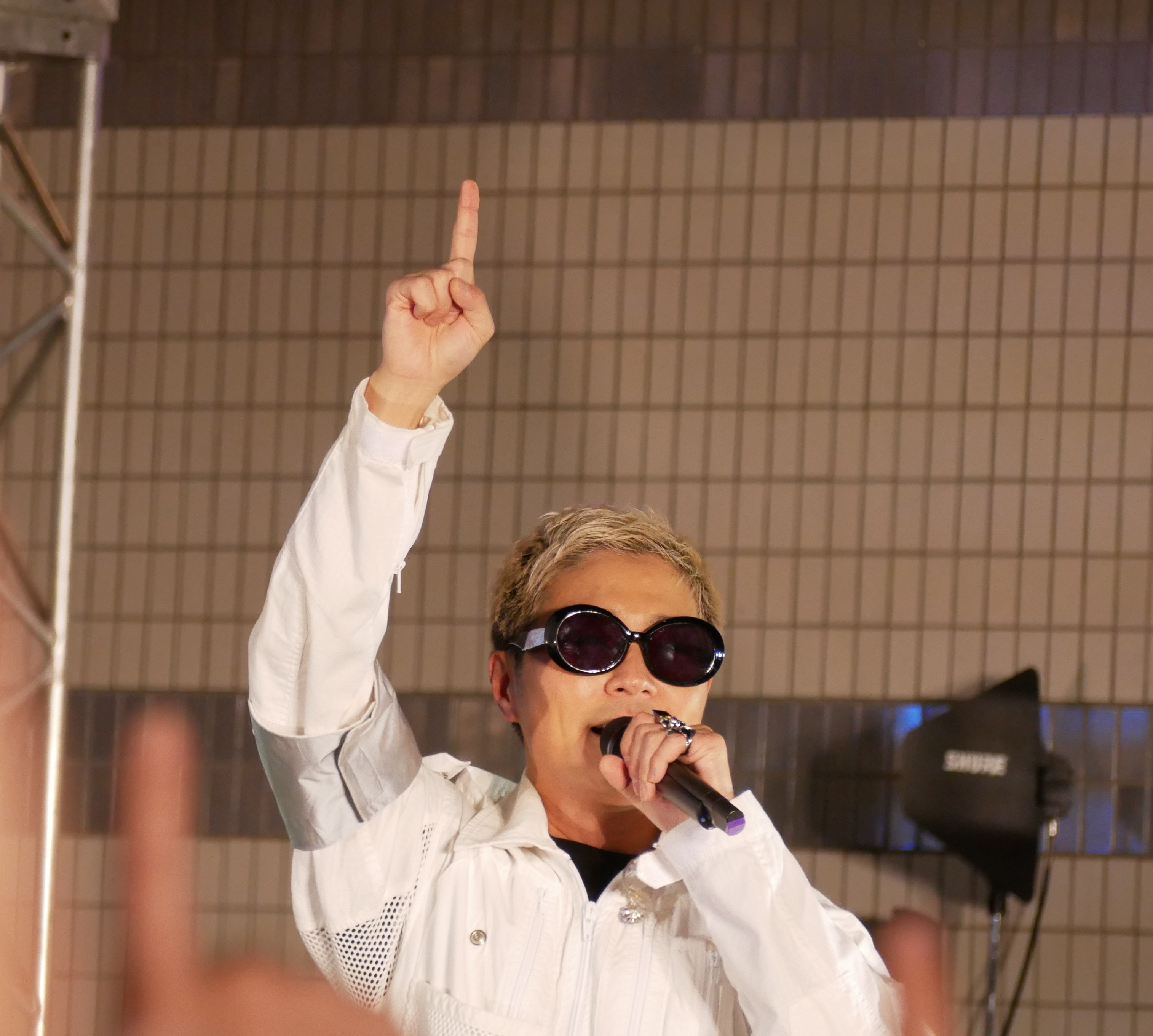
- Verbal in Tokyo, 2019

Background information
- Also known as: L Universe
- Born: Ryu Yeong-gi (류영기); 21 August 1975 (age 51); Tokyo, Japan
- Genre: Hip hop
- Occupations: Rapper; songwriter; music video director; record producer
- Instruments: Vocals; acoustic guitar
- Years active: 1998–present
- Labels: Rhythm Zone; Espionage; Kozm Agency
- Member of: M-Flo; Mic Banditz; PKCZ®; Teriyaki Boyz; Honest Boyz
- Spouse: Yoon Ahn (m. 2004)

- Verbal
- Hangul: 류영기
- Hanja: 柳榮起
- RR: Ryu Yeonggi
- MR: Ryu Yŏnggi

Verbal (born August 21, 1975) is a Japanese rapper, music video director and record producer who debuted in 1998 as a member of the hip hop group M-Flo. He is a third generation Zainichi Korean and a notable representative of Zainichi Korean music in Japan.

M-Flo's hits in the early 2000s, such as "How You Like Me Now?" and "Come Again" led to Verbal rapping and producing a wide range of acts in Japan such as Crystal Kay, BoA, Kumi Koda and Namie Amuro. Verbal considers his role in the group as a "host" than a rapper or producer, though their success and critical acclaim established them as an iconic and influential hip hop production team throughout Asia.

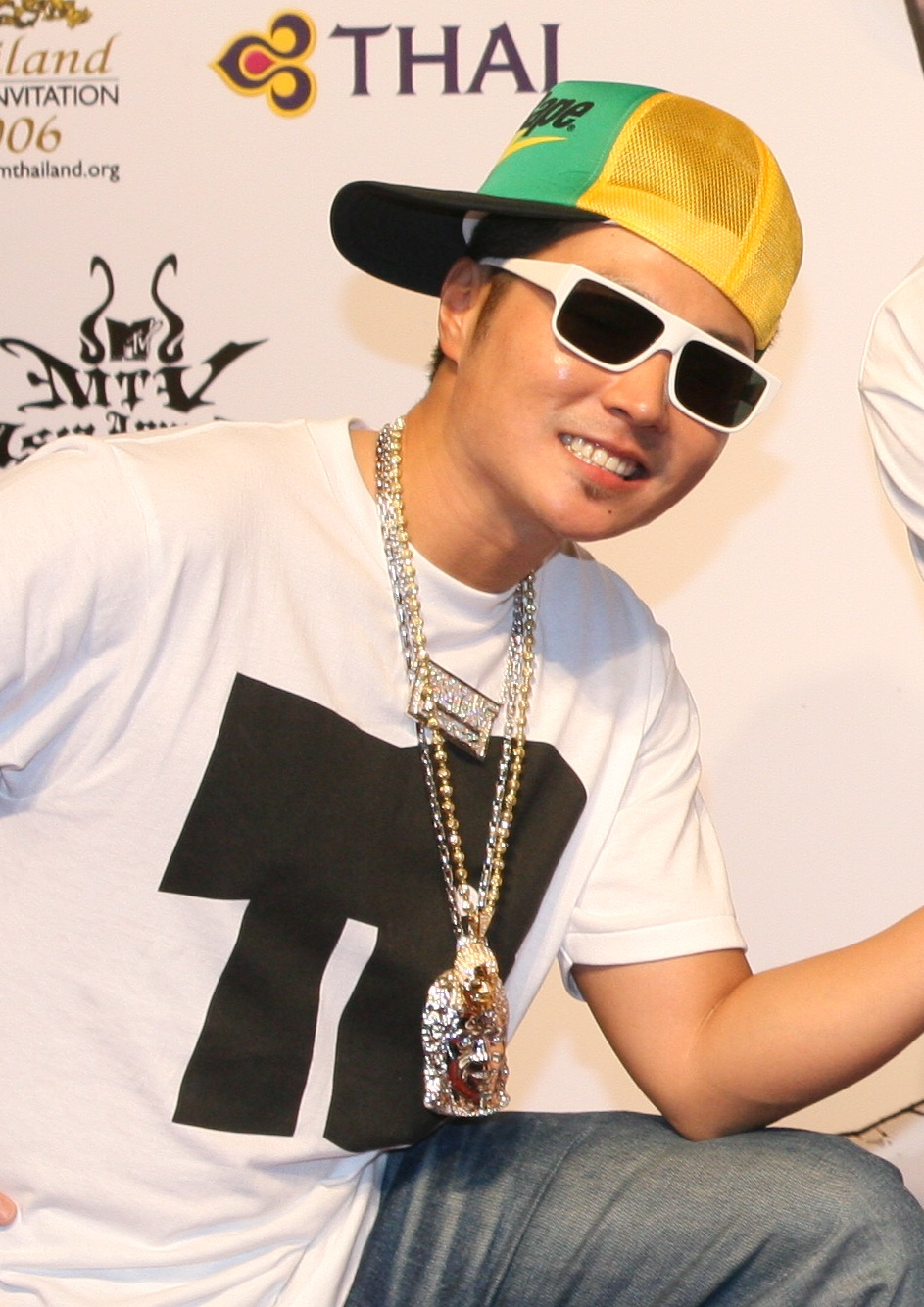
Verbal in Bangkok, Thailand, 2006

Verbal is also a member of other hip hop groups such as Mic Banditz and Teriyaki Boyz and has worked with Kanye West, Pharrell and Kylie Minogue amongst many others.

Verbal is also the chairman of music label Espionage Records (an imprint of Rhythm Zone under Avex Group), production agency Kozm and has a fashion brand called Ambush, co-founded with his wife Yoon Ahn.

He launched his solo career in March 2011 with the debut album Visionair.

== Biography ==
Verbal was born in 1975 in Tokyo of Korean background. In 1985, his parents moved to Boston in the United States for work. When at a YMCA summer camp, Verbal was first exposed to hip hop music, in the form of Run–D.M.C.'s "It's Tricky" when the other children sung the song on the bus for the camp. He was impressed and influenced by the hip hop culture of New York City and at 14 years old he started writing lyrics in English. His parents moved back to Tokyo and Verbal attended St. Mary's International School. He met Taku Takahashi there and the pair formed a rap rock band called N.M.D. in 1992. The band received many offers from major record labels after their live performances, however as Verbal did not see being a rapper as a practical career, he turned down these offers.

Verbal returned to the United States, to study philosophy and marketing at Boston College. In his first year of university, he abandoned these plans after a great romantic disappointment, converting to Protestantism and deciding to study for a masters in divinity at Gordon–Conwell Theological Seminary to become a pastor.

Verbal has said that his influences began with gangster rap groups like N.W.A. After he mistakenly purchased a Gang Starr album, he became interested in East coast hip hop including De La Soul and Pete Rock & CL Smooth.

=== M-Flo ===
In 1998, Verbal returned for winter break to Japan. During this time, he recorded a rap for a cover of Barbra Streisand's "The Way We Were" that Takahashi was producing. Masaji Asakawa from the DJ group GTS, a contact of Takahashi's, believed the song was very high quality. M-Flo was then officially formed, with Verbal and Takahashi recording many songs together. Asakawa believed one of these songs, "Been So Long," featuring vocals from a mutual friend of both Verbal and Takahashi, Lisa, was high enough quality for him to try to convince Verbal to become a full-time musician. He was convinced and the group debuted as a three-person group (with vocalist Lisa) in 1999 with "The Tripod E.P.," which debuted in the top 10 on the Japanese singles chart.

The group achieved great success in 2000 and 2001 with the songs "How You Like Me Now?" and "Come Again," with the former selling more than 220,000 copies and the latter approximately 390,000 copies. The band's second album, Expo Expo, debuted at #4 on the charts. During the group's first two albums, Verbal was travelling back and forth between Japan and America to finish his studies. During these initial years, Verbal had collaborated with a great number of Japanese artists already, including producing the female rap unit Heartsdales.

In 2002, Lisa left M-Flo following a disagreement to pursue a solo career. During this time, Verbal and Takahashi's solo works intensified, with Verbal taking a major part in two different hip hop supergroups, Mic Banditz and Suite Chic.

In 2003, M-Flo returned from hiatus, but instead of using a new full-time vocalist, the band featured a different famous musician on each of their songs.

=== Mic Banditz ===
In 2002, Verbal formed the Japanese hip hop supergroup Mic Banditz on his Espionage Records label imprint. The group comprised rappers Verbal, Arkitec, 51-Goichi-, Coyass, and Clench and Mr. Blistah of the duo Clench & Blistah. The group represented a more traditional hip-hop sound in contrast to M-Flo's pop-influenced sound. They released two full-length albums of majority Japanese-language rap, 2003's Sixth Sense and 2004's Johnny Astro & the Diamond Crooks and collaborated with Japanese R&B singer Emi Hinouchi, who was at the time signed to fellow M-Flo member Taku Takahashi's Tachytelic Records imprint. The group have been on hiatus since 2005.

=== Teriyaki Boyz ===
In 2005, Verbal became a member of another hip hop supergroup, Teriyaki Boyz. The group has collaborated with many famous Western hip hop musicians, such as The Neptunes, the Beastie Boys, Kanye West and Pharrell Williams. The group came to the most prominence in the West with the eponymous theme song for the film The Fast and the Furious: Tokyo Drift in 2006.

In 2007, M-Flo released their final album featuring different vocalists, Cosmicolor. After this point, the group have released sporadically, with a succession of different compilation albums. Verbal has consistently been working with other artists since then, producing songs for such artists as BoA and Halcali. Some of his biggest collaborations since then have been a cover of Godiego's song "The Galaxy Express 999" with Exile, which has been certified as double platinum for cellphone downloads by the RIAJ and a collaboration with Kana Nishino, "Kimi no Koe o," which has been certified gold for cellphone downloads. In 2010, Verbal directed his first music video, Minmi's "Pa to Hanasaku," which also features Verbal.

=== Solo activities ===
In September 2004, Verbal married his college sweetheart, Korean American Yoon Ahn. Together they started jewelry label Ambush, with the initial aim of custom-making jewelry for Verbal. They have since produced several lines of jewelry, collaborating with brands including A Bathing Ape and selling custom pieces to celebrities including Teriyaki Boyz collaborator Kanye West.

On March 16, 2011, Verbal released his debut solo album Visionair, though the March 11 Tōhoku earthquake and tsunami overshadowed the release, causing cancellation of its promotion.

Verbal appeared as the opening act for the tour of Kylie Minogue to Japan in April and the two recorded a charity song titled "We Are One" to raise awareness and encourage donations to UNICEF.

Visionair featured collaborations with international acts Nicki Minaj, Jermaine Dupri, Swizz Beatz and Lil' Wayne, as well as Japan's Namie Amuro.

The first single from the album, "Fall Out" featuring Shunya, is the opening theme song for the drama Perfect Report and was released digitally in December.

May 2011 saw Verbal take Visionair out on the road with the "Angree Yung Robotz" tour alongside electro DJ Mademoiselle Yulia.

== Discography ==
- Visionair (2011)
