= Past Future =

Past<Future
- Original standard edition

Studio album by Namie Amuro
- Released: December 16, 2009
- Recorded: 2008–2009
- Studio: Studio Form: Bunkamura Studio (Tokyo); Azabu-O-Studio (Tokyo); Avex Honolulu Studios (Honolulu); Avex Studio T$UYO$HI; DCH Studio (Tokyo)
- Genre: Pop; electronica; R&B
- Length: 49:07
- Label: Avex Trax
- Producer: Anthony Anderson; Dsign Music; Hiro; Hugo Lira; Ian-Paolo Lira; Jeff Miyahara; Nao'ymt; Steve Smith; T.Kura; Thomas Gustafsson; U-Key Zone

Namie Amuro chronology
Best Fiction (2008)	Past<Future (2009)	Checkmate! (2011)

Alternative cover
- CD+DVD edition and digital download artwork

Singles from Past<Future
- 1. "Wild/Dr." Released: March 18, 2009

Past<Future is the ninth studio album by Japanese pop singer Namie Amuro. It was released on December 16, 2009, through Avex Trax. This was her first original album to be released in two and a half years. The record came after the release of her blockbuster greatest hits album Best Fiction (2008), which sold over a million copies. Unlike her previous studio albums, Queen of Hip-Pop (2005) and Play (2007), Past<Future features a more electropop and synth-pop sound that was prevalent in the Western music charts at the time.

Past<Future received positive reviews from music critics, with praise being directed towards its production value and sounds. Commercially, the album was a success in Japan, hitting the top spot on the Oricon Albums Chart, and has since been certified double platinum by the Recording Industry Association of Japan (RIAJ) for over 500,000 copies sold nationwide. The album reached number one on Taiwan's G-Music's J-pop Chart. It also reached number one on South Korea's Hanteo weekly and monthly albums charts. Past<Future was Amuro's best-selling original album since Genius 2000 (2000), which sold over 800,000 copies.

The only physical single to be released from the album is the double A-side single "Wild/Dr." The single was a commercial success, becoming Amuro's eleventh chart-topper on the Oricon Singles Chart, as well as "Wild" being her second chart-topper on the Billboard Japan Hot 100. The album additionally features the promotional singles "Fast Car," "My Love" and "Copy That," with the latter two appearing in "Premium Vidal Sassoon" commercials that starred Amuro herself. Amuro promoted Past<Future by embarking on the Past<Future hall tour, which ran from April to December 2010.

== Background and development ==
In July 2008, Amuro released the greatest hits album Best Fiction. The album was extremely successful, selling 681,187 copies in the first week and debuting at number one on the Oricon Albums Chart. Within its third week, Best Fiction sold over one million units, making her the first artist to have a million-selling album in three consecutive life generations (Sweet 19 Blues at age 18, 181920 at age 20 and Best Fiction at age 30). Best Fiction spent six consecutive weeks at the number-one position, becoming the first album to do so in more than 14 years since Dreams Come True's 1993 album Magic. By the end of 2008, Best Fiction became the year's second best-selling album right behind Exile's Exile Love. In addition, it became the second best-selling digital-format album by a Japanese artist behind Hikaru Utada's Heart Station. Best Fiction was awarded the Album of the Year award at the 50th Japan Record Awards (analogous to Album of the Year from the Grammy Awards).

To promote the album, Amuro embarked on the Best Fiction Tour, which ran from October 25, 2008, to July 12, 2009. It was estimated that she played to an audience as high as 500,000, potentially the largest audience of her career to that point. The Live DVD and Blu-ray of the tour were released on September 9, 2009.

Amuro first revealed in the March 2009 issue of S Cawaii that she was preparing a new album which she would begin recording during her Best Fiction Tour. In the interview, she also confirmed that the direction of the album would be different from her previous album. Confirmation of the impending release of Amuro's ninth studio album occurred several months later when media outlets began to report new commercials with new songs by the singer would appear not in a new single, but a new album in the near future.

On October 22, 2009, it was announced that Amuro would have a new album coming out by the end of the year, with its title being undecided at the time. On November 26, 2009, the album title was revealed along with its cover art. Amuro stated that she saw Past<Future as a "fresh start" following the highly successful Best Fiction.

== Composition ==
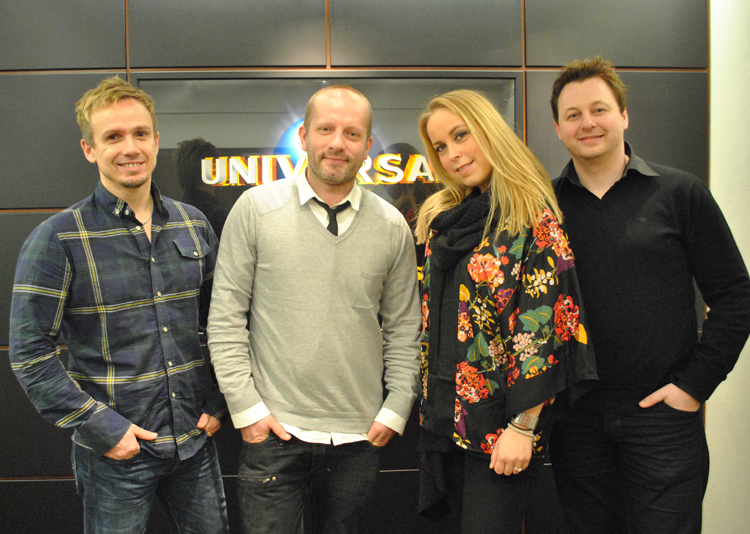
Dsign Music, one of Amuro's collaborators on the album

Unlike Play (2007), which was produced solely by Michico and T.Kura of Giant Swing Productions and Nao'ymt, Amuro sought other writers and producers for this project. Dsign Music, a Scandinavian production team, was the first to reveal that they had written new material for Amuro on their official website on June 12, 2009. In a blog entry, songwriter/producer, Hiro, who has written for other artists including Kumi Koda and J Soul Brothers, confirmed that he produced "My Love." The lyrics to "Love Game" were written by R&B artist Double, who Amuro previously collaborated with on the song "Black Diamond" a year prior. "Steal My Night" was written by urban-pop producer Jeff Miyahara.

The album begins with R&B track "Fast Car." "Copy That" is an upbeat song that features a "James Bond theme"-style intro. "Love Game" is a dance-pop song with lyrics comparing love to boxing. The song "Bad Habit" is a club track with a heavy bassline. "Steal my Night" is a song with a reggaeton beat that was also used in 2005's "Want Me, Want Me." "First Timer" is a techno-pop song that includes a rap feature from Doberman Inc.

"Wild" is an up-tempo electropop song that incorporates synthesizers and keyboards. Although the sound was created with a dance-oriented rhythm, Michico and T. Kura revealed that the lyrics had a deeper meaning that reflected Japan's freefalling childbirth rate. As a result, they desired to write lyrics that conveyed an important social message while also attempting to "have fun" and "get wild." "Dr." is an R&B and opera-inspired dance-pop song which samples an orchestral section from "Boléro", composed by French conductor Maurice Ravel. "Shut Up" is a song with rock elements, which is further enhanced by the vocal effects. "My Love" is a US-style R&B song that uses synth sounds and autotune. "The Meaning Of Us" is a piano-driven pop ballad. The album's closing number, "Defend Love," is a futuristic club track.

== Release and formats ==
Past<Future was released on December 16, 2009, her ninth studio album overall. It was released in two versions: a CD+DVD edition and a CD only edition. The first press of both versions came housed in a digipak, and pre-orders came with an original poster. The album contains 12 songs totaling nearly 50 minutes in length. Six music videos were included on the CD+DVD format: "Fast Car," "Love Game," "Wild," "The Meaning of Us," "Dr." and "Defend Love." Shoji Uchida shot the album artwork and photoshoot, with both editions depicting Amuro ripping up the cover of Best Fiction. The album's art direction was handled by Kazoo Sato and Katsuhiro Shimizu, creative direction handled by Sato and its booklet was designed by Shimizu.

== Promotion ==
Amuro appeared as a secret guest at the 1st anniversary event of the fashion magazine Ginger held in Tokyo on March 27, 2010; other celebrities such as Yamada Yu, Karina Nose, Maki Nishiyama, Hiromi Go and Hitomi also appeared at the event. In May 2010, Amuro became the first Asian female artist to appear at the world's largest music festival, World Music Awards, held in the Principality of Monaco. She also became the second Japanese act to perform at the event, 17 years after Chage and Aska did so in 1993. In June 2010, Tatsunoko Productions designed Amuro as a Tatsunoko-style character under the title "Amuro Meets Tatsunoko"; Coca-Cola Zero cans and cookies with illustrations were sold at her tour venues and on the Vision Factory website.

=== Singles and other songs ===
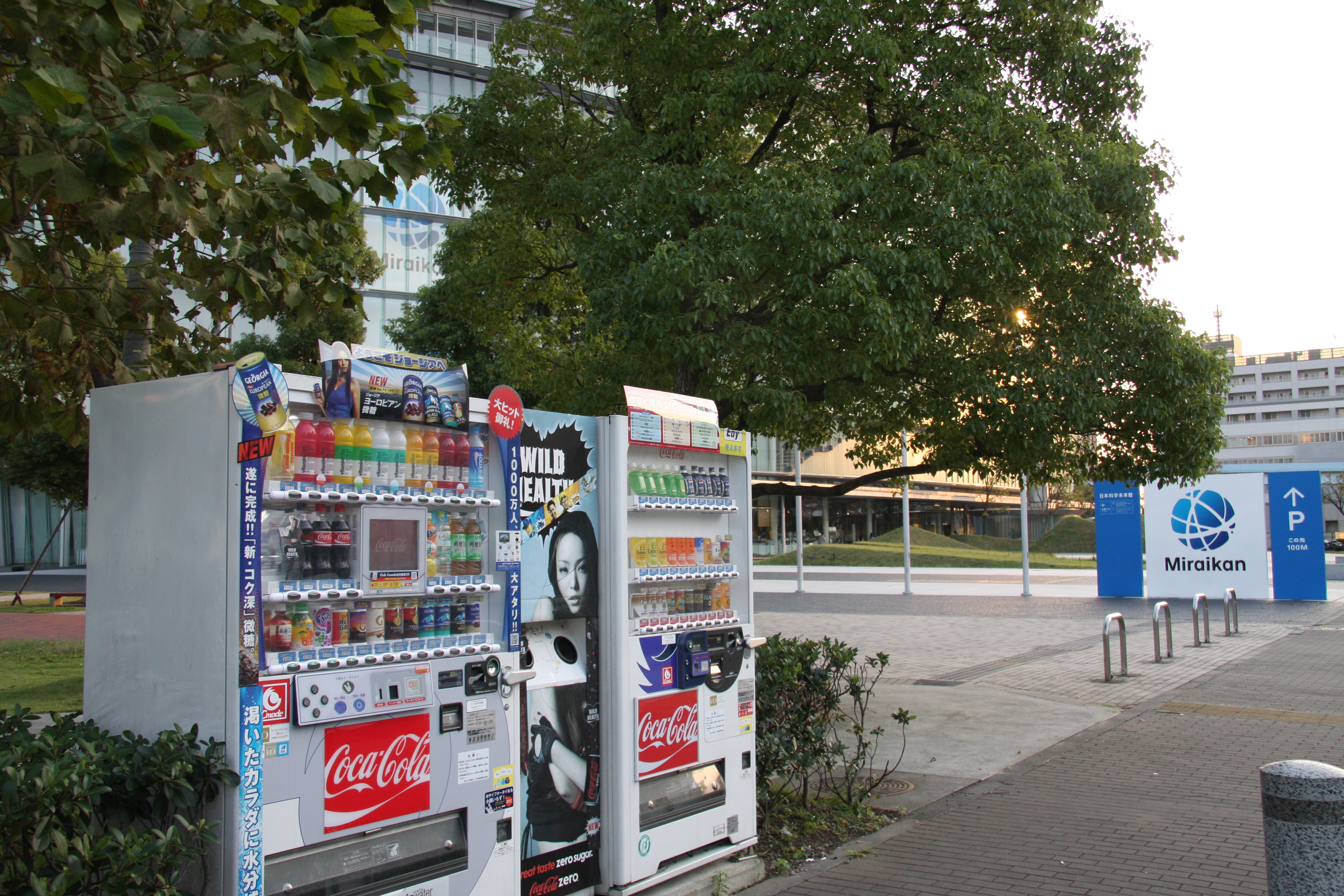
Amuro's image promoting her song Wild on a Coca-Cola vending machine in October 2009

The only physical single to be released from this album is the double A-side single "Wild/Dr." The single was a success, becoming her eleventh number one on the Oricon Singles Chart. "Wild" became her second number one on the Japan Hot 100, according to Billboard Japan. The single sold over 119,000 units in Japan, her seventh highest-selling single in the 2000s decade, and was certified gold by the Recording Industry Association of Japan for exceeding shipments of 100,000 units. Both "Wild" and "Dr." served as advertising jingles for Coca-Cola Zero and Vidal Sassoon respectively. After the release of the single "Wild/Dr.," the first songs to be promoted from the album were "My Love" and "Copy That," which appeared in new commercials for Vidal Sassoon. They premiered on the web first and later on television in October 2009. "My Love" would later make its radio premiere on J-Wave's Groove Line on October 27. Both "My Love" and "Copy That" were released as ringtones online on November 18. Two more songs from the album, "Fast Car" and "The Meaning Of Us" also made their radio premieres on November 23 and 24.

=== Music videos ===
The music video for "Fast Car" was directed by Shigeaki Kubo. It has an Elizabethan theme, but is primarily a dance video. The "Fast Car" video won two awards at the Space Shower Music Awards: the grand prize for the best work of the year, "Best Video of the Year," and the "Best Art Direction Video." The music video for "Love Game" was also directed by Shigeaki Kubo; it depicts Amuro and her dancers having various dance battles on digital stages, with the teams distinguished by the color of their outfits (black or white). The music video for "Wild" was directed by Caviar, which features a futuristic space theme and costumes.

The music video for "The Meaning Of Us," which was directed by Shigeaki Kubo, features Amuro alone in a house during several timelines and the video alternates between these scenes. The music video for "Dr." is entirely animated and is Amuro's first fully animated music video. It was animated by Kamikaze Douga, and directed by Mizusaki Junpei. Tanakazoo directed the music video for "Defend Love." The "Defend Love" music video was a collaboration with Sunrise Animation, featuring Namie Amuro as an animated character interacting with Amuro Ray of Mobile Suit Gundam. Part of the video re-creates the encounter between Amuro Ray and Lalah Sune in the Ghost of Solomon event, with Namie Amuro in place of Lalah piloting a pink Elmeth.

=== Past<Future Tour ===
Past<Future Tour
- Tour by Namie Amuro
- Associated album: Past<Future
- Start date: April 3, 2010
- End date: December 15, 2010
- Legs: 1
- No. of shows: 85

Namie Amuro concert chronology
- Best Fiction Tour (2008-2009); Past<Future Tour (2010); Live Style 2011 (2011)

To promote the album, Amuro embarked on a hall tour, billed Past<Future Tour 2010. The tour began on April 3, 2010 at the Ichihara Civic Hall in the Chiba Prefecture, and was originally scheduled to conclude on November 21 at the Okinawa Convention Center. Additional dates were later added in Tokyo, Osaka and Nagoya, extending the tour to December 15. In total, Amuro performed 85 concerts across Japan, making it her longest spanning concert tour up to that point, exceeding her previous tour, the Best Fiction Tour (2008-2009). The December 1 and 7 dates at the Tokyo International Forum, Hall A were originally scheduled for October 14 and October 15, 2010, but due to inflammation of the vocal cords, these dates were postponed and later added with additional performances at that venue. The concert tour lasted for 8 months and drew in about 210,000 spectators.

The Tokyo performances were recorded and released on DVD and Blu-ray on December 15, 2010, coinciding with the final date of the tour. Both physical formats were re-released on September 16, 2012, as part of Amuro's 20th career anniversary, with the original content but at a lower retail price. The live release also topped the music DVD rankings for the second consecutive year and the fourth time in total.

Past<Future Tour set list
1. "Fast Car"
2. "Rock Steady"
3. "Copy That"
4. "Sexy Girl"
5. "Funky Town"
6. "Can't Sleep, Can't Eat, I'm Sick"
7. "First Timer"
8. "Want Me, Want Me"
9. "Bad Habit"
10. "Wild"
11. "Dr."
12. "Steal My Night"
13. "Think of Me"
14. "The Meaning of Us"
15. "Baby Don't Cry"
16. "Do Me More"
17. "Black Diamond"
18. "Love Game"
19. "Rock U"
20. "Break It"
21. "What a Feeling"
22. "Shut Up"
23. "Defend Love"

Encore

24. "Copy That" (reprise; includes band and dancers introduction)
25. "Get Myself Back"
26. "My Love"

Notes

- Starting with the Nagoya concert on May 8, "Get Myself Back" was added to the setlist.
- Starting with the Chiba concert on June 29, "Break It" was added to the setlist.
- Prior to the August concerts, "Break It" was originally performed during the encore.
- After the Osaka concert on September 19, "Think of Me" was removed from the setlist.

== Critical reception ==
Professional ratings
Review scores
Source	Rating
Rolling Stone Japan	4.5/5 stars
CD Journal	(positive)

Past<Future received positive responses from music critics. Takurō Ueno rated the album four and a half out of five stars on Rolling Stone Japan. The review praised the album’s bold, attention‑grabbing opening, noting that the brassy, banjo‑like sound and unexpected swing feel are completely new for Amuro and immediately pull the listener in. The critic highlights how her vocals blend seamlessly with a wide range of styles—from futuristic pop to rock‑influenced tracks like “First Timer” and “Wild/Dr.” Ueno described the album as an ambitious, confident work that shows Amuro at the height of her powers, with no rivals in sight.

A mini-review from CD Journal was concise but appreciative, highlighting the album as a strong comeback after two and a half years. The critic notes that most tracks pit Amuro’s delicate vocals against heavy, beat‑driven production, creating an exciting tension that defines the album’s sound. Because of this contrast, the ballad “The Meaning of Us” stands out prominently. The reviewer also mentions the inclusion of a substantial 24‑page booklet, adding a tactile bonus to the release.

== Chart performance ==
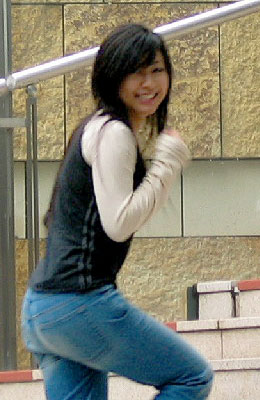
Past<Future became the first album by a female soloist to top the first half of the year ranking since 2004, having previously been set by Utada Hikaru Single Collection Vol. 1 by Hikaru Utada (pictured).

Past<Future debuted at number one on the daily Oricon Albums Chart, with a first day sales tally of around 112,000 copies. At the end of its first week of release, the album went on to top the weekly albums chart, selling 330,742 copies. With the number one position of this album, she became the first solo artist to have an original album top the charts in each age group from her debut as a teenager through her 20s and into her 30s. Past<Future also topped the charts in five Asian countries and regions, with Japan included, thus becoming the first Japanese female artist in history to achieve this record. The album dropped to number three on the chart on its second week, logging sales of 87,210 copies. It stayed at number three on its third week, shifting 79,187 copies. Past<Future stayed in the top ten one last week on its fourth week, ranking at number nine and selling 15,488 copies.

The album stayed in the top 300 chart for a total of forty-two weeks. Past<Future was certified double platinum by the Recording Industry Association of Japan (RIAJ) in December 2009 for selling over 500,000 copies. According to Oricon, Amuro's album Past<Future was the number one album of 2010 for the first six months of the fiscal year, making it the first time since her debut in 1992 that she topped the first half-year album ranking. This was also the first time in six years since Hikaru Utada's Utada Hikaru Single Collection Vol. 1 in 2004 that a female soloist topped the first half of the year ranking with an album.

In December 2010, Past<Future was named the sixth best-selling album of 2010 in Japan with 574,525 copies sold, and was also the year's second best-selling album by a female soloist behind Kana Nishino's To Love. According to Oricon Style, Past<Future is Amuro's eighth best-selling album overall.

== Track listing ==
CD
No.	Title	Lyrics	Music	Producer(s)	Length
1.	"Fast Car"	Tiger	Anne Judith Wik, Ronny Svendsen, Robin Jenssen, Nermin Harambasic, Chris Young	Dsign Music	3:20
2.	"Copy That"	Michico	T.Kura, Michico	T.Kura for Giant Swing Productions	4:25
3.	"Love Game"	Double	Anthony Anderson, Joleen Belle, Jaden Michaels, Steve Smith	Anthony Anderson & Steve Smith for SA TrackWorks Productions	3:39
4.	"Bad Habit"	Tiger	Hugo Lira, Thomas Gustafsson, Negin, lan-Paolo Lira	H.Lira, T.Gustafsson, I–P Lira for Random Music	3:10
5.	"Steal My Night"	Jeff Miyahara, Kanata Okajima	Jeff Miyahara	Jeff Miyahara	3:32
6.	"First Timer" (featuring Doberman Inc)	Michico, Doberman Inc	T.Kura, Michico, Doberman Inc	T.Kura for Giant Swing Productions	5:24
7.	"Wild"	Michico	T.Kura, Michico	T.Kura for Giant Swing Productions	3:18
8.	"Dr."	Nao'ymt	Nao'ymt	Nao'ymt	5:41
9.	"Shut Up"	Nao'ymt	Nao'ymt	Nao'ymt	4:08
10.	"My Love"	Hiro	Hiro	Hiro for Digz, Inc.	4:04
11.	"The Meaning of Us"	Momo "Mocha" N.	Momo "Mocha" N., U-key Zone	U-Key Zone	4:28
12.	"Defend Love"	Nao'ymt	Nao'ymt	Nao'ymt	4:03
Total length:					49:07

DVD
No.	Title	Director(s)	Length
1.	"Fast Car" (Music video)	Shigeaki Kubo	3:25
2.	"Love Game" (Music video)	Shigeaki Kubo	3:56
3.	"Wild" (Music video)	Caviar	3:22
4.	"The Meaning of Us" (Music video)	Shigeaki Kubo	4:35
5.	"Dr." (Music video)	Junpei Mizusaki (Kamikaze Douga), Shuichi Sato, Yasuhiko Shimizu	5:54
6.	"Defend Love" (Music video)	Tanakazoo & Yusuke Tanaka	4:26

== Charts ==
=== Weekly charts ===
Chart (2009–2010)	Peak position
Japanese Albums (Oricon)	1
Taiwanese Albums (G-Music)	7
Taiwanese J-pop Albums (G-Music)	1

=== Monthly charts ===
Chart (2009)	Peak position
Japanese Albums (Oricon)	3

=== Year-end charts ===
Chart (2010)	Position
Japanese Albums (Oricon)	6

== Sales and certifications ==
Region	Certification	Certified units/sales
Japan (RIAJ)	2× Platinum	575,763
