= Best Fiction Tour =

2008–09 concert tour by Namie Amuro

- Tour by Namie Amuro
- Associated album: Best Fiction
- Start date: October 25, 2008
- End date: July 12, 2009
- Legs: 3
- No. of shows: 60 in Japan; 2 in Taiwan; 2 in China; 64 Total

Namie Amuro concert chronology
- Play Tour (2007-2008); Best Fiction Tour (2008); Past<Future Tour (2010)

The Best Fiction Tour was the tenth concert tour by Japanese recording artist Namie Amuro in support of her greatest hits album, Best Fiction (2008). The tour began on October 25, 2008 at Makuhari Messe Event Hall in Chiba, Japan and ended on July 12, 2009 at the Shanghai Grand Stage in Shanghai, China. The tour broke attendance records for Japanese solo female artists, playing to almost 500,000 fans across Japan, China and Taiwan.

== Itinerary ==
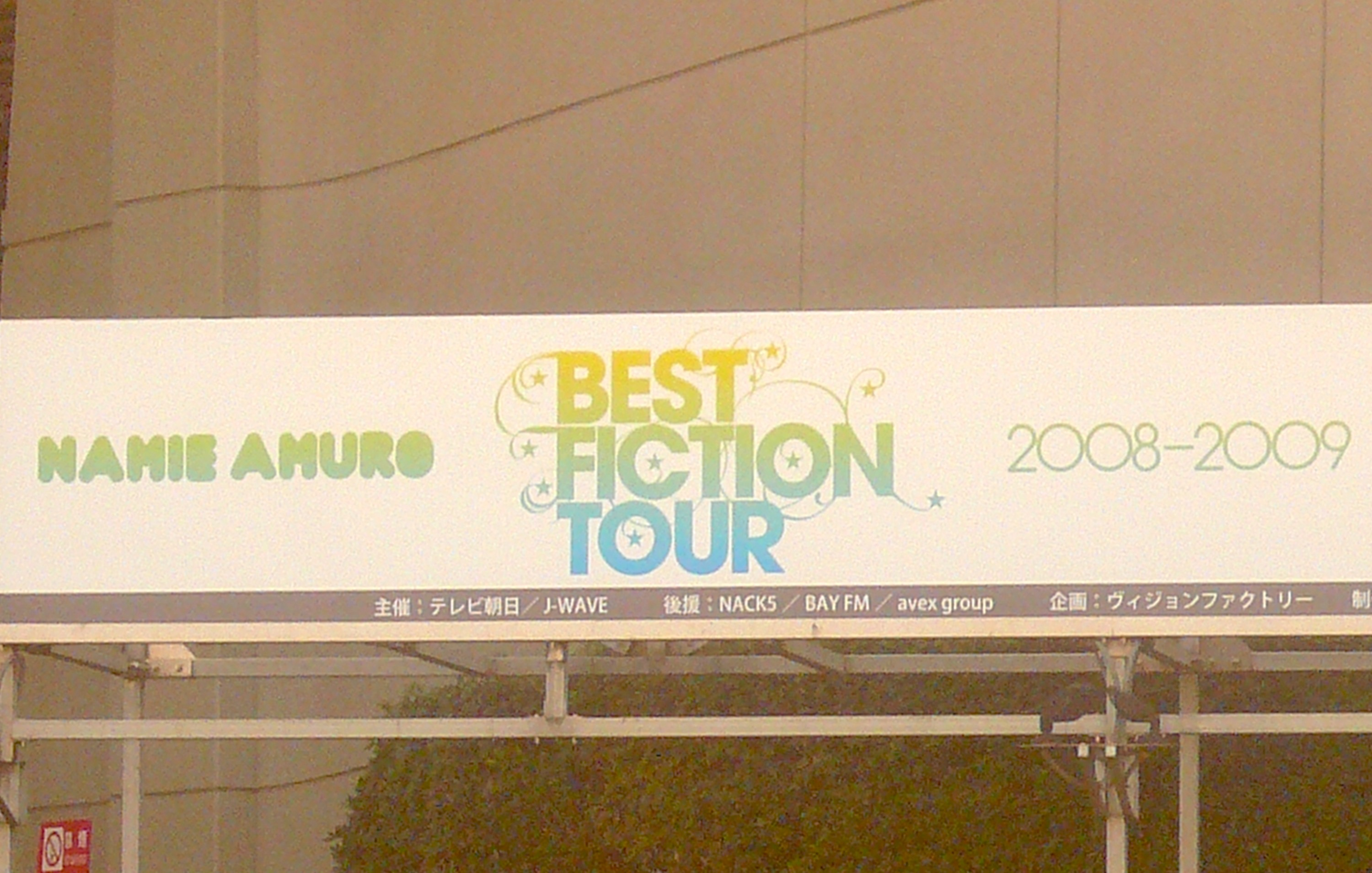
A billboard at the Yoyogi National Gymnasium in Tokyo displaying the tour logo

The initial tour dates were announced on May 27, 2008 with 25 stops in 15 cities across Japan. An additional 15 dates and an additional city were added on August 18, 2008 before the start of the tour.

On October 25, 2008, the tour began in Chiba, Japan at the Makuhari Messe Event Hall and continued through December 21, 2008 at Aoi-mori Arena in Aomori, Japan. Another round of 20 additional dates were added on December 29, 2008, bringing the total amount of dates in Japan to 60. The second leg of the tour began on January 14, 2009 at Sendai Hot House Arena in Miyagi, Japan and played its final show in on 31 May at the Morioka Ice Arena in Iwate, Japan.

On March 22, 2009, it was announced that the tour would be headed towards the Asian continent with four additional shows in Taiwan and China set respectively in June and July. Overall, the tour spanned a total of 10 months, 64 dates, 3 countries, with a total attendance of an estimated 500,000 people.

== Set list ==
The set list for the Best Fiction Tour includes 16 of the 17 songs included on Best Fiction, with "All for You" being the only exception. Several album tracks from her two most recent studio albums, Queen of Hip-Pop (2005) and Play (2007), were also included. "Luvotomy" and "Black Diamond", originally released as collaborations with other artists, were performed as solo versions. "Say the Word", released in 2001, is the oldest song included on the set list. This is her first tour to not include any of her songs produced by Tetsuya Komuro.

When the tour began on October 25, 2008, Amuro performed 28 songs. "Wild" and "Dr." were added to the set list starting with the Nagoya concert on March 4, 2009.

1. "Do Me More"
2. "Violet Sauce"
3. "Alarm"
4. "So Crazy"
5. "New Look"
6. "Hello"
7. "Girl Talk"
8. "Shine More"
9. "Full Moon"
10. "Luvotomy"
11. "Put 'Em Up"
12. "It's All About You"
13. "Wishing on the Same Star"
14. "Rock Steady"
15. "Funky Town"
16. "No"
17. "Say the Word"
18. "Dr."
19. "Wild"
20. "White Light"
21. "Hide & Seek"
22. "Queen of Hip-Pop"
23. "Sexy Girl"
24. "Want Me, Want Me"
25. "Top Secret"
26. "Black Diamond"
27. "What a Feeling"

Encore

28. "WoWa"
29. "Can't Sleep, Can't Eat, I'm Sick"
30. "Baby Don't Cry"

== Tour dates ==
Date	City	Country	Venue	Attendance
October 25, 2008	Chiba	Japan	Makuhari Messe Event Hall	450,000
October 26, 2008	Chiba	Japan	Makuhari Messe Event Hall	450,000
November 1, 2008	Sapporo	Japan	Hokkaido Prefectural Sports Center	450,000
November 2, 2008	Sapporo	Japan	Hokkaido Prefectural Sports Center	450,000
November 8, 2008	Fukui	Japan	Sun Dome Fukui	450,000
November 9, 2008	Fukui	Japan	Sun Dome Fukui	450,000
November 15, 2008	Fukuroi	Japan	Shizuoka Ecopa Arena	450,000
November 16, 2008	Fukuroi	Japan	Shizuoka Ecopa Arena	450,000
November 22, 2008	Hiroshima	Japan	Hiroshima Green Arena	450,000
November 23, 2008	Hiroshima	Japan	Hiroshima Green Arena	450,000
November 29, 2008	Fukuoka	Japan	Marine Messe Fukuoka	450,000
November 30, 2008	Fukuoka	Japan	Marine Messe Fukuoka	450,000
December 6, 2008	Saitama	Japan	Saitama Super Arena	450,000
December 7, 2008	Saitama	Japan	Saitama Super Arena	450,000
December 13, 2008	Sendai	Japan	Sendai Hot House Super Arena	450,000
December 14, 2008	Sendai	Japan	Sendai Hot House Super Arena	450,000
December 20, 2008	Aomori	Japan	Aomori Arena	450,000
December 21, 2008	Aomori	Japan	Aomori Arena	450,000
January 14, 2009	Nagoya	Japan	Nippon Gaishi Hall	450,000
January 15, 2009	Nagoya	Japan	Nippon Gaishi Hall	450,000
January 20, 2009	Osaka	Japan	Osaka-jō Hall	450,000
January 21, 2009	Osaka	Japan	Osaka-jō Hall	450,000
January 24, 2009	Kagoshima	Japan	Kagoshima Arena	450,000
January 25, 2009	Kagoshima	Japan	Kagoshima Arena	450,000
January 31, 2009	Niigata	Japan	Niigata Sangyou Shinkou Center	450,000
February 1, 2009	Niigata	Japan	Niigata Sangyou Shinkou Center	450,000
February 10, 2009	Tokyo	Japan	Yoyogi National Gymnasium	450,000
February 11, 2009	Tokyo	Japan	Yoyogi National Gymnasium	450,000
February 13, 2009	Tokyo	Japan	Yoyogi National Gymnasium	450,000
February 14, 2009	Tokyo	Japan	Yoyogi National Gymnasium	450,000
February 21, 2009	Tokyo	Japan	Yoyogi National Gymnasium	450,000
February 22, 2009	Tokyo	Japan	Yoyogi National Gymnasium	450,000
February 26, 2009	Osaka	Japan	Osaka-jō Hall	450,000
February 27, 2009	Osaka	Japan	Osaka-jō Hall	450,000
March 3, 2009	Nagoya	Japan	Nippon Gaishi Hall	450,000
March 4, 2009	Nagoya	Japan	Nippon Gaishi Hall	450,000
March 7, 2009	Yokohama	Japan	Yokohama Arena	450,000
March 8, 2009	Yokohama	Japan	Yokohama Arena	450,000
March 14, 2009	Kobe	Japan	World Memorial Hall	450,000
March 15, 2009	Kobe	Japan	World Memorial Hall	450,000
March 20, 2009	Okinawa	Japan	Okinawa Convention Center	450,000
March 21, 2009	Okinawa	Japan	Okinawa Convention Center	450,000
April 4, 2009	Nagano	Japan	Nagano M-Wave	450,000
April 5, 2009	Nagano	Japan	Nagano M-Wave	450,000
April 10, 2009	Okayama	Japan	Okayama City Cultural Gymnasium	450,000
April 11, 2009	Okayama	Japan	Okayama City Cultural Gymnasium	450,000
April 18, 2009	Mie	Japan	Mie Sun Arena	450,000
April 19, 2009	Mie	Japan	Mie Sun Arena	450,000
April 28, 2009	Tokyo	Japan	Yoyogi National Gymnasium	450,000
April 29, 2009	Tokyo	Japan	Yoyogi National Gymnasium	450,000
May 2, 2009	Tokyo	Japan	Yoyogi National Gymnasium	450,000
May 3, 2009	Tokyo	Japan	Yoyogi National Gymnasium	450,000
May 9, 2009	Maebashi	Japan	Green Dome Maebashi	450,000
May 10, 2009	Maebashi	Japan	Green Dome Maebashi	450,000
May 16, 2009	Oita	Japan	Beppu Beacon Plaza Convention Hall	450,000
May 17, 2009	Oita	Japan	Beppu Beacon Plaza Convention Hall	450,000
May 23, 2009	Nagoya	Japan	Nippon Gaishi Hall	450,000
May 24, 2009	Nagoya	Japan	Nippon Gaishi Hall	450,000
May 30, 2009	Morioka	Japan	Morioka Ice Arena	450,000
May 31, 2009	Morioka	Japan	Morioka Ice Arena	450,000
June 20, 2009	Taipei	Taiwan	Taipei Arena	20,000
June 21, 2009	Taipei	Taiwan	Taipei Arena	20,000
July 11, 2009	Shanghai	China	Shanghai Indoor Stadium	20,000
July 12, 2009	Shanghai	China	Shanghai Indoor Stadium	20,000
Total				490,000

== DVD ==
Namie Amuro Best Fiction Tour 2008–2009

Video by Namie Amuro
- Released: September 9, 2009
- Recorded: June 20–21, 2009
- Label: Avex Trax

Namie Amuro chronology
Play Tour 2007 (2007)	Namie Amuro Best Fiction Tour 2008–2009 (2009)

The live music video of the tour was released on September 9, 2009. The video captures her dates in June at the Taipei Arena in Taiwan. It was her first overseas concert to have been filmed for commercial release. In the first week of the release, the live video sold about 155,000 copies on DVD format and 14,000 copies on Blu-ray format, making her the first artist to top both charts at the same time in Japanese Oricon charts history. As of 2010 it has sold about 260,510 copies on DVD format.

It was released as a DVD and Blu-ray on September 9, 2009. The DVD version is a limited edition and is exclusively packaged in a digipak with a slipcover. It will be sold until September 30, 2009. It is currently not known if a regular edition of the DVD will be printed afterward.

=== Personnel ===
- Executive producer: Takashi Kasuga, Masato "Max" Matsumoto, Shinji Hayashi, Katsuro Ohshita, Hajime Tanguchi
- Staging producer: Izumi Matsuzawa
- Staging director: Fuyuki Yamamoto
- Sound production: Nao'ymt
- Art director: Hidekazu "Kazoo" Sato
- Public relations: Yukio Takemura, Akira Kobayashi, Masahiro Tashiro, Shintaro Higuchi, Tatsuya Ikeda, Yu Koiguchi
- A&R: Hiromi Amano
- Artist management: Rika Yasumoto
- Dancer management: Yumiko Ochiai
- Merchandising: Kazuo Ueno

=== Band ===
- Bass: Tsuyoshi Ishikawa
- Drums: Mitsuru Kurauchi
- Guitar: Shinji Ohmura
- Keyboards: Shigeo Komori
- Dancers: Tetsuharu, Hide, Yusuke, Hossy, Mittan, Nao, Natsumi, Asuka, Hiromi, Manami

=== Crew ===
==== Staging ====
- Stage set designer: Kazutomo Yamamura
- Stage set coordinator: Naoto Hori
- Chief carpenter: Tadahiro Nakamurara
- Carpenters: Yasushi Shimazaki, Taiki Takeyama, Yasushi Oomori, Katsutoshi Miyazi, Hiroshi Hasegawa, Kentaro Minami, Ryosuke Fukushima, Tetsuya Sunahra, Yoshio Hayashi, Yoshito Amano, Rikiya Nakada, Tatsunori Kazikawa, Ryoutaro Komatsu
- P.A. crew: Keiji Shigeta, Maso Toba, Hideo Sato, Hiroki Kamehama, Nanae Ito, Marie Adachi, Syouji Yuzawa, Kana Doi
- Lighting designer: Hideki Maki
- Lighting coordinator: Osamu Yamaguchi
- Lighting operator: Satoshi Hatakenaka, Minoru Otaki, Hiroko Toya, Takeshi Ogihara, Seiichirou Kishi
- Illumination coordinator: Akihiko Hayashi
- Illumination operator: Nao Kuremura, Nozomi Ito
- Visual art planner & operator: Takeshi Yoshimoto
- Visual operator: Satoru Terao, Hiroyuki Ono, Eiko Iijiri, Keisuke Dohi, Makoto Kurosawa, Yuu Sasaki, Shigemi Todoroki
- Manipulator: Akihisa Murakami
- Manipulator assistant: Yasuo Kitahara, Tatsuya Nagatake
- Instrument coordinator: Shigemi Otake
- Instrument tech: Kenichi Saito, Hideki Nagaoka, Hideki Nagaoka, Kazuya Takahashi
- Special effect coordinator: Takayuki Komine
- Special effect operator: Akiko Mitasaki, Hiroyuki Mochizuki

==== Costuming ====
- Hair & Make-up: Satomi Kurihara, Eriko Ishida
- Stylist: Shinichi Mita
- Wardrobe: Rie Yamazaki, Yuri Yamaguchi

==== Video ====
- Creative director & planner: Hidekasu "Kazoo" Sato
- Director: Yasuhiko Shimizu, Yuchi Kodama, Yoshiya Okoyama, Sachi Sawada
- Producer: Kentaro Kinoshita
- Production manager: Hideki Harada
- Coordinator: Go Kato
- Camera: Takeshi Hanzawa
- Art: Mamoru Furumoto
- Costume Designer: Hiroko Sogawa
- Hair & Make-up: Asami Nemoto
- Make-up creator: Shoichiro Matsuoka
- Model: Amber Thompson

=== Certifications ===
Region	Certification	Certified units/sales
Japan (RIAJ)	Gold	100,000^{^}
^{^} Shipments figures based on certification alone.

== Extras ==
- Best Non Fiction (Off shot)
