= Wild (Namie Amuro song) =

- CD, digital and streaming cover

Single by Namie Amuro

from the album Past<Future
- A-side: "Dr."
- Released: March 18, 2009
- Recorded: 2008
- Studio: Azabu-O (Tokyo)
- Genre: Electro-pop; dance
- Length: 3:20
- Label: Avex Trax
- Songwriter(s): Michico; T. Kura; Nao'ymt
- Producer(s): Michico; T. Kura; Nao'ymt

Namie Amuro singles chronology
"60s 70s 80s" (2008)	"Wild" / "Dr." (2009)	"Fake" (2010)

"Wild" is a song by Japanese singer Namie Amuro. It was released by Avex Trax on March 16, 2009, and serves as the lead single for her ninth studio album, Past<Future (2009). Furthermore, all physical and digital formats included the A-side titled "Dr.," which appears on the parent album. Amuro intended to depart from her previous releases with "Wild" and "Dr.", her first forays into new material. Michico, T. Kura, and Nao'ymt created and produced "Wild," which was recorded at Tokyo's Azabu-O-Studio with Ryosuke Kataoka's assistance.

Musically, "Wild" represents a departure from her previous work, shifting from R&B to uptempo club and electronic music. Music critics applauded the song's production quality, instrumentation, sound, and Amuro's vocal abilities, with some citing it as a standout among Amuro's musical discography. Commercially, the single was a success in Japan, peaking at number one on the Oricon Singles Chart and being certified gold twice by the Recording Industry Association of Japan (RIAJ) for exceeding 100,000 digital and physical sales combined.

Cavier directed the music video for the single, which depicts Amuro and backup dancers in a futuristic setting. The visual was included with the parent album's DVD release. It also appeared on the set lists of two Amuro concerts and subsequent live albums. "Wild" was used as a commercial theme for Coke Zero's Japanese distribution, as well as other Avex Trax and Music.JP campaigns.

== Background ==
Following her commercial resurgence with her studio album Play (2007) and greatest hits collection Best Fiction (2008), Amuro went on a nationwide tour in Japan. She later expanded it, performing in China, Hong Kong, and Taiwan. Subsequent live releases were widely distributed in Japan and were commercially successful. While on tour, Amuro started working on new music with long-time collaborators Michico, T. Kura, and Nao'ymt, as well as international producers such as Dsign Music.

Amuro announced new music in early 2009, stating that future singles would be linked to commercial endorsements. In February, she announced a collaboration with Vidal Sassoon, a hairstyling and haircare company, as well as her involvement in Coke Zero distribution in Japan. Amuro released two singles, "Wild" and "Dr.", as double A-side singles, and shared a preview of their music videos.

== Development and composition ==
"Wild"
A sample of "Wild", an upbeat number that incorporates "aggressive" and "cool" club and electro-pop sounds

Amuro intended to depart from her previous releases with "Wild" and "Dr.", which served as the first forays into new material. When Amuro and her team were approached to take part in the Coke Zero campaign, they asked Michico and T. Kura to write a song for them. Although the sound was created with a dance-oriented rhythm, Michico and T. Kura revealed that the lyrics had a deeper meaning that reflected Japan's declining childbirth rate. As a result, they desired to write lyrics that conveyed an important social message while also attempting to "have fun" and "get wild."

Michico, T. Kura, and Nao'ymt worked together to write and produce the final product. Ryosuke Kataoka helped record the song at Azabu-O-Studio in Tokyo, where D.O.I. mixed it and Tom Coyne mastered it. Musically, "Wild" differs from her previous work, shifting from R&B to an upbeat "aggressive" and "cool" club and electro-pop sounds. Bradley Stern of MuuMuse described it as a "squealing, pulsating electro-infused uptempo number". Japanese magazine CDJournal described the song's "aggressive" sound as "grandiose orchestration" featuring heartbeat rhythms.

== Release and promotional activity ==
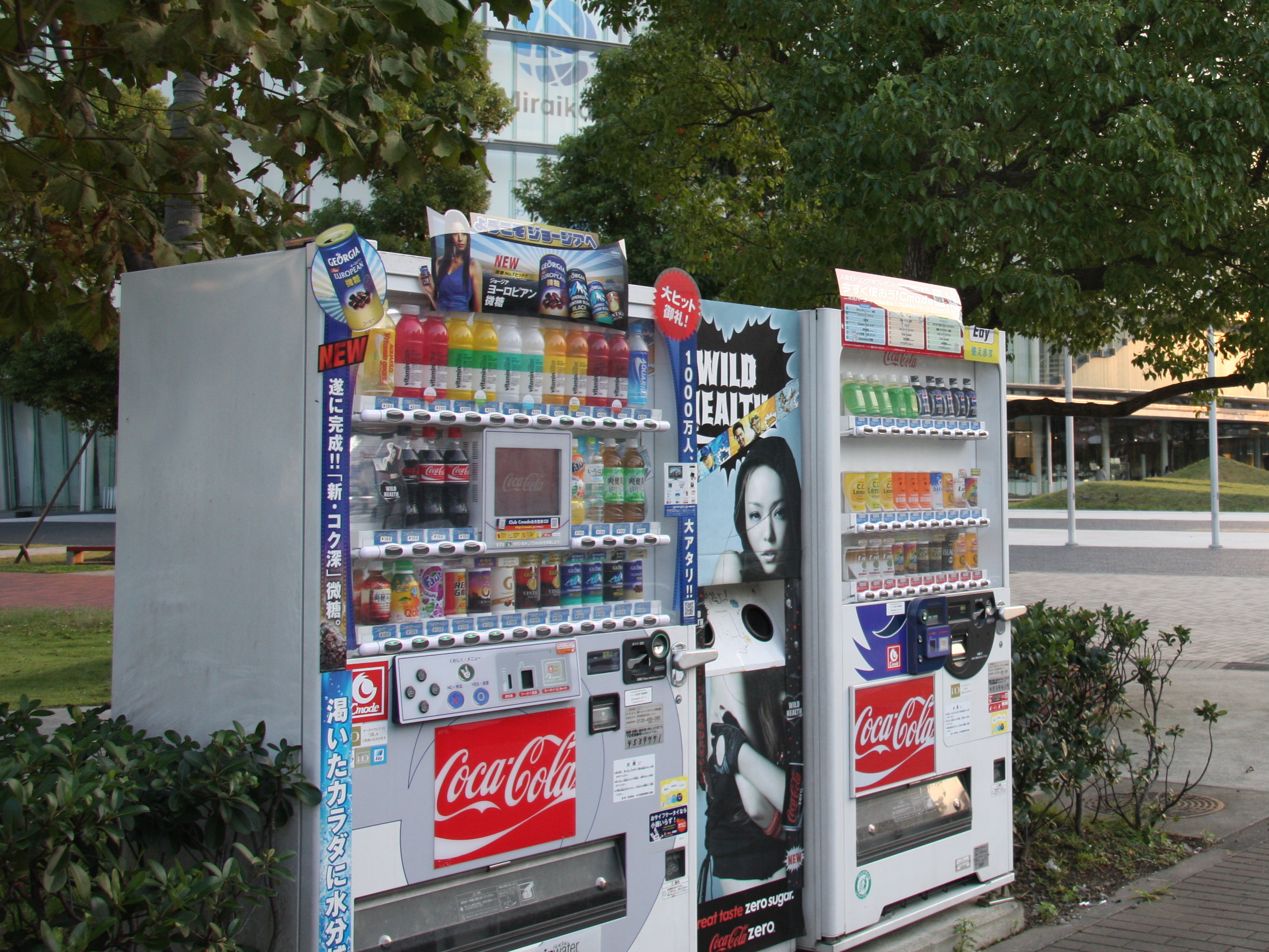
Vending machines in Japan promoting an image of Amuro taken from her "Wild" Coke Zero campaign.

Before the single was widely distributed, snippets of the song and music video were made available. In Japan, an early promotional disc featuring "Dr." was released, as well as another containing "Wild" and instrumental versions. On March 16, 2009, Avex Trax released "Wild" and "Dr." as the lead single from her ninth studio album, Past<Future (2009). The standard format contains both songs and their instrumental versions, while the DVD version includes music videos for both singles. The DVD version was later made available in China and Hong Kong the same month. The singles were available in both digital and streaming formats.

Cavier directed the music video for the single, which features Amuro and backup dancers in a futuristic environment. (Note: Video description taken from footage on the DVD version of Past<Future.) According to Amuro, the majority of the choreography and filming for the video was completed during her Best Fiction Tour, with rehearsal and shooting time being "tight". Stern compared the music video to the visuals for "Feedback" by American singer Janet Jackson, who inspired Amuro's career. The visual was featured on the set lists of two of Amuro concerts and live albums: the Best Fiction Tour and the Past Future Tour, as well as the parent album's DVD release.

"Wild" served as a commercial theme for Avex Trax promotions and the Music.JP website. Prior to their initial release, "Wild" and "Dr." were confirmed as commercial themes for Coke Zero and Vidal Sassoon, respectively, with Amuro featured in both campaigns. For "Wild", Amuro appeared in the commercial in front of a computer-generated speaker, dancing to the song and drinking a bottle of Coke Zero.

== Reception ==
Music critics gave "Wild" positive reviews. Victoria Goldenberg of Purple Sky chose "Wild" and "Dr." as Amuro's best tracks from the parent album and her career, stating, "The shifting song structure and Bolero samples in "Dr." push the boundaries of the brief pop song, while the succinct, irresistibly punchy rhythms of "Wild" embrace them." Bradley Stern of MuuMuse wrote, "Namie’s newest is a sweat-worthy stomper with a gloss of dizzying future sounds and manic vocals. In a word: Delicious." Tower Records called the song an "exciting dance number" and praised its eclectic mix of sounds and genres. CDJournal praised the song's arrangement and Amuro's vocal delivery, calling it "powerful". Tetsuo Hiraga of Hot Express praised the song's mix of genres, which was also reflected in the song's parent album.

Commercially, the single was a success in Japan. "Wild" and "Dr." debuted at number one on both daily and weekly Oricon Singles Chart, selling 75,456 units in its first week. As a result, she broke her own record of having all of her singles debut in the top ten (on the Daily Singles Chart) over the previous 15 years. It charted for 17 weeks and was the 45th best-selling single of the year, selling 119,352 copies. "Wild" became her second number one on the Japan Hot 100, according to Billboard Japan. Since its release, "Wild" has received two gold certifications from the Recording Industry Association of Japan (RIAJ) for exceeding 100,000 physical and ringtone sales. The single also peaked at number three on Taiwan's East Asian Singles Chart. (Note: Week references for G-Music: "Wild"/"Dr." 2009 week 12.)

== Formats and track listing ==
CD / streaming formats

1. "Wild" – 3:19
2. "Dr." – 5:39
3. "Wild" (Instrumental) – 3:19
4. "Dr." (Instrumental) – 5:39

Digital formats

1. "Wild" – 3:19
2. "Dr." – 5:39

DVD

1. "Wild" (music video)
2. "Dr." (music video)

== Credits and personnel ==
Credits adapted from the liner notes of Past<Future.

Locations

- Recorded at Azabu-O-Studio in Tokyo.

Personnel

- Namie Amuro – vocals
- T. Kura – arranger, composer, instrumentation, producer, songwriter
- Michio – arranger, composer, instrumentation, producer, songwriter
- Nao'ymt – arranger, composer, instrumentation, producer, songwriter
- D.O.I. – mixing
- Hidekazu Sato – creative director
- Katsuhiro Shimizu – art director
- Shoji Uchida – photographer
- Akemi Nakano – make-up artist
- Shinichi Mita – stylist

== Charts ==
=== Weekly charts ===
Chart (2009)	Peak position
Japan Hot 100 (Billboard Japan)	1
Japan Singles (Oricon)	1
Taiwan (G-Music)	3

=== Year-end charts ===
Chart (2009)	Position
Japan Hot 100 (Billboard Japan)	49
Japan Singles (Oricon)	45
Taiwan (Yearly Singles Top 100)	50

== Certifications ==
Region	Certification	Certified units/sales
Japan (RIAJ) CD version.	Gold	100,000^{^}
Japan (RIAJ) "Wild" Ringtone.	Gold	100,000^{^}
^{^} Shipments figures based on certification alone.

== Release history ==
"Wild"/"Dr." release history
Region	Date	Format	Label	Ref(s).
Japan	March 18, 2009	CD single; DVD	Avex Trax	
China	March 18, 2009	CD single; DVD	Avex Trax	
Hong Kong	March 18, 2009	CD single; DVD	Avex Trax	
Various	N/A	Digital download; streaming	Avex Trax	
