= Live Style 2006 =

2006 concert tour by Namie Amuro

- Tour by Namie Amuro
- DVD artwork
- Start date: August 13, 2006
- End date: November 23, 2006
- Legs: 1
- No. of shows: 23

Namie Amuro concert chronology
- Space of Hip-Pop (2005); Live Style 2006 (2006); Play Tour (2007-2008)

Live Style 2006 (billed as Namie Amuro Best Tour "Live Style 2006") was the seventh concert tour by Japanese recording artist Namie Amuro. It was the first in Amuro's series of Live Style concerts, which would be held several times throughout her career. The tour began on August 13, 2006 at the Saitama Super Arena, and concluded on November 23, 2006 at the Okinawa Convention Center, in Amuro's hometown of Okinawa Prefecture. It marked Amuro's first national arena tour since the Break the Rules Tour in 2001, and achieved the highest attendance ratings for any of her tours up to that point.

== Background ==
In 2005, Amuro released her seventh studio album, Queen of Hip-Pop. The album was commercially successful in Japan and marked the beginning of her comeback, and its promotional hall tour had additional shows added due to high demand. Following the announcement of her double A-side single, "Can't Sleep, Can't Eat, I'm Sick/Ningyo", which was released in May 2006, it was announced that Amuro would begin a new national arena tour in August 2006. The tour dates were first announced on the March 2006 issue of Amuro's fan club magazine, Fan Space.

Unlike Amuro's previous concert tours, Live Style 2006 was not associated with any album or single. The tour was held in celebration of the 15th anniversary of her debut with the Super Monkey's. Former members Anna Makino, Hisako Arakaki and Minako Ameku attended one of the concerts and reunited with Amuro.

== Set list ==
The set list for the Live Style 2006 tour notably included many songs that Amuro had never performed live before, including B-sides and tracks from her Suite Chic project. Additionally, she performed her then-new single "Can't Sleep, Can't Eat, I'm Sick", in both original and remixed versions, and several songs from her recent albums.

1. "Violet Sauce"
2. "Handle Me"
3. "Without Me"
4. "Fish"
5. "A Walk in the Park"
6. "Say the Word"
7. "Put 'Em Up"
8. "Alarm"
9. "No More Tears"
10. "Strobe"
11. "Exist for You"
12. "Four Seasons"
13. "Ningyo"
14. "Lovin' It"
15. "Drive"
16. "Girl Talk"
17. "Can't Sleep, Can't Eat, I'm Sick"
18. "Do or Die"
19. "Uh Uh,,,,,,"
20. "How to Be a Girl"
21. "Want Me, Want Me"
22. "Shine More"
23. "The Speed Star"

Encore

24. "Body Feels Exit"
25. "Chase the Chance"
26. "Can't Sleep, Can't Eat, I'm Sick" (remix)

Notes

- During the Yamagata concert on August 27, the Nagoya concerts on September 2 and 3, and the Tokyo concert on September 18, Amuro performed "You're My Sunshine" during the encore.
- During the Osaka concert on November 5 and the Okinawa concert on November 23, Amuro performed "Never End" during the encore.
- Additionally, during the final concert in Okinawa on November 23, "Go! Go! (Yume no Hayasade)" and "Can You Celebrate?" were also performed.

== Tour dates ==
Tour dates
Date (2006)	City	Venue	Attendance
August 13	Saitama	Saitama Super Arena	—
August 19	Chiba	Makuhari Messe Event Hall	—
August 20	Chiba	Makuhari Messe Event Hall	—
August 26	Yamagata	Yamagata Prefectural General Sports Park Gymnasium	—
August 27	Yamagata	Yamagata Prefectural General Sports Park Gymnasium	—
September 2	Nagoya	Nagoya Rainbow Hall	—
September 3	Nagoya	Nagoya Rainbow Hall	—
September 9	Sendai	Kamei Arena Sendai	—
September 10	Sendai	Kamei Arena Sendai	—
September 17	Tokyo	Yoyogi National Stadium First Gymnasium	20,000
September 18	Tokyo	Yoyogi National Stadium First Gymnasium	20,000
September 23	Hiroshima	Hiroshima Sun Plaza Hall	—
September 24	Hiroshima	Hiroshima Sun Plaza Hall	—
September 30	Sapporo	Makomanai Ice Arena	—
October 7	Tokyo	Yoyogi National Stadium First Gymnasium	20,000
October 8	Tokyo	Yoyogi National Stadium First Gymnasium	20,000
October 14	Fukuroi	Ecopa Arena	—
October 21	Fukuoka	Marine Messe Fukuoka	—
October 28	Osaka	Osaka-jō Hall	—
October 29	Osaka	Osaka-jō Hall	—
November 4	Osaka	Osaka-jō Hall	—
November 5	Osaka	Osaka-jō Hall	—
November 23	Ginowan	Okinawa Convention Center	—

== Live recordings ==
Namie Amuro Best Tour "Live Style 2006"

Video by Namie Amuro
- Released: February 21, 2007
- Recorded: September-October 2006
- Venue: Yoyogi National Stadium First Gymnasium, Tokyo
- Genre: Pop; R&B
- Label: Avex Trax

Namie Amuro chronology
Space of Hip-Pop: Namie Amuro Tour 2005 (2006)	Namie Amuro Best Tour "Live Style 2006" (2007)	Namie Amuro Play Tour 2007 (2008)

The concert was released as a live DVD titled Namie Amuro Best Tour "Live Style 2006" on February 21, 2007. The footage included on the DVD was recorded during the Tokyo concerts at the Yoyogi National Stadium First Gymnasium. It also includes an interview filmed in Okinawa as bonus content. The release was commercially successful, peaking at number 2 on the Oricon DVD chart and remaining on the charts for 46 weeks.

Additionally, the performances of "Go! Go! (Yume no Hayasade)", "Can You Celebrate?" and "Never End" from the Okinawa concert on November 23, 2006, which were not included on the DVD, were made available for streaming for free on Yahoo! Video for a limited period of time from February 21 to March 20, 2007.

=== Charts ===
Chart (2007)	Peak position
Japan Weekly DVD Chart (Oricon)	2
Japan Year-End DVD Chart (Oricon)	12
