= Dr. (song) =

- Cover art for digital and CD/DVD bundle

Single by Namie Amuro

from the album Past<Future
- A-side: "Wild"
- Released: March 18, 2009
- Recorded: 2008
- Studio: Azabu-O (Tokyo)
- Genre: Dance
- Length: 5:39
- Label: Avex Trax
- Songwriter(s): Nao'ymt
- Producer(s): Nao'ymt

Namie Amuro singles chronology
"60s 70s 80s" (2008)	"Wild" / "Dr." (2009)	"Fake" (2010)

"Dr." is a song by Japanese recording artist Namie Amuro, taken as the only A-side single from her ninth studio album Past<Future (2009). The track was written, composed, arranged and produced entirely by long-time collaborator Nao'ymt, and recorded at Azabu-O Studios in Minato, Tokyo. Musically, "Dr." is a dance number that is influenced by modern club music, and also samples an orchestral section from the musical piece "Boléro", composed by French conductor Maurice Ravel. Lyrically, it is a love song that uses the titular term to metaphorically describe Amuro's lover.

The single premiered on March 18, 2009 with Amuro's recording "Wild". Critical responses of "Dr." were divided; some music critics appreciated it as a single, whilst some criticized the production and composition. Commercially, it was a success in Japan, peaking at number one on the Oricon Singles Chart. Additionally, the track by itself reached number 39 on the Japan Hot 100 chart, provided by Billboard. The song was certified in two different categories by the Recording Industry Association of Japan (RIAJ) for equal sales of 100,000 copies.

An accompanying music video for the single was directed by Junpei Mizusaki from Kamikaze Douga, alongside assistant directors Shuichi Sato Yasuhiko Shimizu. Served as an anime-styled visual, it depicts Amuro as a fictional heroine trying to restore vegetation and life back to a post-apocalyptic landscape, straight after a warzone. She has performed "Dr." on her Best Fiction tour (2008–09), the Past<Future Tour (2010), and its most recent appearance on her Livegenic Tour in 2015. Additionally, a re-worked version was created for her final greatest hits album Finally (2017).

== Background and release ==
After releasing her third greatest hits album Best Fiction (2008), Amuro conducted a concert tour throughout Japan and different parts of Asia to support its material. While on tour, the singer revealed two new tracks: "Wild" and "Dr.", and subsequently added them to the setlist. In early January 2009, Amuro appeared on a Vidal Sassoon commercial that promoted its Japanese products, and a snippet of "Dr." was televised. "Dr." was written, composed, arranged and produced entirely by long-time collaborator Nao'ymt, and recorded at Azabu-O Studios in Minato, Tokyo during the end of 2008. Amuro felt that the release of this new record was a fresh start for her career. Additionally, several publications reported the track to be a mixture of "opera, electro, techno and R&B" music, something influenced throughout the parent album.

The singer's record label, Avex Trax, confirmed that "Wild" and "Dr." would be released as a double A-side single. The single premiered on March 18, 2009 with Amuro's recording "Wild". It was distributed in two physical formats in Japan and Hong Kong; a standard CD that included the singles and their instrumental tracks, and a second bundle that included the same track list on one disc, and the music videos to each recording on a second DVD disc. The recorded versions were published for digital consumption on March 25, 2009. The cover art was photographed by Shoji Uchida, featuring Amuro in a black hooded vest, with chains tangled around her wrists.

== Composition ==
Musically, "Dr." is a mid-tempo dance number that is influenced by modern club music, and also samples an orchestral section from the musical piece "Boléro" through its pre-chorus sections, composed by French conductor Maurice Ravel. According to Tetsuo Hiraga from Hot Express, he compared the "dance" sound to many contemporary artists in the Western market. The song opens with a "futuristic" generic robotic vocal stating "Access... please press enter after input your wish," and features the sound of a heartbeat in the background to carry the song's pace. The Ravel sample includes various orchestral arrangements for 11 seconds in each pre-chorus, and leads straight back to the song's original dance sound. Bradley Stern from MuuMuse noted the tracks "mash" of several song styles, and pointed out R&B and opera being some of them. Similarly, online catalogue Selective Hearing described it as "all-over-the-place", and said that the pre-chorus "breaks off into some sort of weird stacatto, marching band type stuff...". Lyrically, it is a love song that talks about "erasing the wounds from the past", and embracing the future as lovers. Additionally, the song uses the titular term to metaphorically describe Amuro's lover.

== Reception ==
"Dr." received mixed reviews from most music critics. On a positive note, Japanese magazine CD Journal commended the tracks arrangement, Amuro's vocal deliveries, and its status as being a single. As part of the album, the magazine complimented the tracks lyrical content and Nao'ymt's "futuristic" production. An editorial review from Billboard Japan describe the song as "gorgeous", where as Takuro Ueno from Rolling Stone Japan called it "fantastic" and highlighted it as one of the album highlights. Tetsuo Hiraga from Hot Express heavily lauded the track, describing it as her own "Bohemian Rhapsody". He also complimented the tracks sense of prosperous, in terms of genre development with her future music. Western website Selective Hearing gave it an average remark, labelling it "alright". The blog complimented the tracks "nice start", until they criticized the "strange" orchestral sample and felt it "wrecked the flow of the song". Additionally, they concluded, "If that part were taken out or revised I would have thought better of it." MuuMuse editor Bradley Stern was critical towards the tracks leaked demo, saying "it appears to be one, massive hot mess of song." However, as part of Past<Future, he felt it was a highlight to the album.

Commercially, "Dr." was a success in Japan. Charting with "Wild", the single debuted at number one on the Oricon Singles Chart, selling 75,456 copies in its first week. This resulted in being her eleventh overall number-one single, her second consecutive number-one, and essentially her first single to debut atop of the Oricon charts since her 1998 single "I Have Never Seen". Additionally, "Wild" and "Dr." are her last singles to reach number one in Japan. The following week, the single fell to number eight, selling 17,996 units. Overall, the singles ranked in the charts for 17 weeks, and sold a total of 119,352 copies in the region. It was ranked at number 45 on Oricon's yearly chart. As a stand-alone track, "Dr." debuted at number 64 on the Japan Hot 100 chart, provided by Billboard, and peaked at 39. The song was certified in two different categories—physical sales and ringtone purchases—by the Recording Industry Association of Japan (RIAJ) for separate sales of 100,000 copies.

== Promotion and live performances ==
"Dr." has been performed on three concert tours in Asia. Its first appearance was on her 2008-2009 Best Fiction Tour, which was placed during the concert's fourth segment. A television-aired performance was recorded at Yokohama Arena on March 8, 2009, and an essential live recording was recorded at Yoyogi National Gymnasium between April 28 and April 29. A year later, Amuro added the song onto her Past<Future Tour, placed as the 11th track. A live release was published throughout Asia on December 15, 2010. The song's most recent appearance was on her Livegenic Tour, which featured the singer tour throughout Asia between 2015 and 2016. It was placed during the third segment, and was added onto the live releases for 2016.

Furthermore, the track was used as the commercial track for the Vidal Sassoon commercial that promoted its Japanese products, as mentioned above. The commercial, which featured Amuro, featured her in an "elegant" bath inside a medieval European palace. The song has been re-recorded once for one of her compilation albums. This was for her last greatest hits album Finally (2014), which featured new arrangement by Nao'ymt once again.

== Track list and formats ==
CD single

1. "Wild" — 3:20
2. "Dr." — 5:41
3. "Wild" (Instrumental) — 3:20
4. "Dr." (Instrumental) — 5:37

DVD single

1. "Wild" — 3:20
2. "Dr." — 5:41
3. "Wild" (Instrumental) — 3:20
4. "Dr." (Instrumental) — 5:37
  1. "Wild" (music video)
  2. "Dr." (music video)

Digital download

1. "Wild" — 3:20
2. "Dr." — 5:41

== Personnel ==
Credits adapted from the singles's liner notes.

Song credits

- Namie Amuro – vocals
- D.O.I. – mixing
- Recorded by Ryosuke Kataoka at Daimonion Recordings, Tokyo, Japan
- Nao'ymt – producer, composer, instrumentation, arrangement, song writing

Visual and video credits

- Hidekazu Sato – creative direction
- Katsuhiro Shimizu – art direction
- Shoji Uchida – photographer
- Akemi Nakano – make-up
- Shinichi Mita – stylist
- Junpei Mizusaki – video director
- Hidekazu Satō
- Yasuhiko Shimizu

== Charts ==
=== Daily and weekly positions ===
Chart (2009)	Peak position
Japan Daily Singles Chart (Oricon)	1
Japan Weekly Singles Chart (Oricon)	1
Japan Hot 100 Chart (Billboard)	39

=== Yearly positions ===
Chart (2009)	Peak position
Japan Singles Chart (Oricon)	45

== Certification and sales ==
Region	Certification	Certified units/sales
Japan (RIAJ) WILD／Dr. (Physical)	Gold	100,000^{^}
Japan (RIAJ) Full-length Ringtone	Gold	100,000^{*}
^{*} Sales figures based on certification alone.^{^} Shipments figures based on certification alone.

== Release history ==
Region	Date	Format	Label
Japan	March 18, 2009	CD single; DVD	Avex Trax
Hong Kong	March 18, 2009	CD single; DVD	Avex Trax
Japan	March 25, 2009	Digital download	Avex Trax
Australia	March 25, 2009	Digital download	Avex Trax
New Zealand	March 25, 2009	Digital download	Avex Trax
United Kingdom	March 25, 2009	Digital download	Avex Trax
Germany	March 25, 2009	Digital download	Avex Trax
Ireland	March 25, 2009	Digital download	Avex Trax
France	March 25, 2009	Digital download	Avex Trax
Spain	March 25, 2009	Digital download	Avex Trax
Taiwan	March 25, 2009	Digital download	Avex Trax
United States	March 25, 2009	Digital download	Avex Trax
Canada	March 25, 2009	Digital download	Avex Trax
