= Fast Car (Namie Amuro song) =

Promotional single by Namie Amuro

from the album Past<Future
- Released: December 16, 2009
- Recorded: 2009
- Genre: Pop
- Length: 3:20
- Label: Avex Trax
- Songwriters: Tiger; Anne Judith Wik; Ronny Svendsen; Robin Jensen; Nermin Harambasic; Chris Young
- Producer: Dsign Music

"Fast Car" is a song by Namie Amuro. It was released as the main promotional track from her 9th album, Past<Future, in November 2009. Amuro finds the song indicative of her sound on Past<Future. The album puts more emphasis on songs with "bright melodies/coolness," instead of the R&B/hip-hop beats of Play and previous albums.

== Composition ==
The song is an upbeat pop song with a retro, with influences of "cabaret" jazz. The lyrics use a 'fast car' as a metaphor for how the song's protagonist sees her lover. She wants him to "speed it up," and states that "nobody else can ride (him)" (誰にも 乗らせない, dare ni mo norasenai.) Amuro describes the lyrics as being a "playful adult love song," where a woman is teasing a boy by saying that he is hers. Amuro chose the song for her album after listening to a demo from pop music production team Dsign Music. She liked it for its "analog atmosphere," and said it reminded her of the Sofia Coppola film Marie Antoinette. The song was composed and its English lyrics written by the Dsign Music team, while female Japanese rapper Tiger wrote the song's lyrics, who had previously worked with Amuro in 2003 single "So Crazy."

== Release ==
The song was first released to radio on November 24, when it was played on the J-Wave "Groove Line" radio show. It was released as a ringtone download on December 2. The song charted on the Billboard Japan Hot 100 in early December, and peaked at #5 on the December 28 chart. The song also charted on the RIAJ Digital Track Chart Top 100 at #24 (though only after the album has been released, due to the song not being released for full chaku-uta (cellphone download) or digital download).

== Music video ==
Bourgeois theme in the music video for "Fast Car."

The music video was shot by director Shigeaki Kubo, and was shot over two days. The video has a "gorgeous bourgeois world" theme, and was given the concept after Amuro's first impressions of listening to a demo of the song., The video made its TV Premiere November 26, 2009.

The video centers around scenes shot in four different Palace of Versailles-inspired rooms: a bedroom, a hallway, a main hall, and a more contemporary striped alcove. In the bedroom, she performs a dance with hand-held fans, with four female dancers on a four poster bed. In the hallway scene, she walks in from the door at the end and performs a contemporary style dance with four male dancers in a bourgeois/cabaret-inspired outfit. The main hall dance begins in a contemporary style with all eight dancers, and transitions to a ballroom style. In the red alcove, she poses in a black dress and leather stilettos without dancing, instead mouthing the song's lyrics and making small posture changes. The majority of scenes in the last minute focus on the main hall dance.

Amuro found the video the most difficult music to create in her 17-year music career, due to the clothing and choreography. She calls the video the highlight of the Past Future session videos.

The video won the award for Best Female Video at the 2010 MTV World Stage VMAJ, as well as the Best Video of the Year award and Best Art Direction Video award at the 14th Space Shower Music Video Awards.

== Charts ==
Weekly chart performance for "Fast Car"
Chart	Peak position
Billboard Japan Hot 100	5
RIAJ Digital Track Chart Top 100	24

Annual chart chart rankings for "Fast Car"
Chart (2010)	Rank
Japan Adult Contemporary (Billboard)	64
