= My Love (Namie Amuro song) =

Promotional single by Namie Amuro

from the album Past<Future
- Released: December 16, 2009
- Recorded: 2009
- Genre: R&B
- Length: 4:04
- Label: Avex Trax
- Songwriter: Hiro
- Producer: Hiro

"My Love" is a song by Namie Amuro. It was released as a radio single from her 9th album "Past<Future" in October 2009, after being chosen as one of two commercial songs simultaneously used in Vidal Sassoon hair product campaigns.

== Writing ==
The song is a mid-tempo contemporary R&B track, described as a "sweet love song" by Amuro. The lyrics describe the things that a lover makes them feel, such as feeling that "everything (you do) is so special" (全てがSo Specialで, subete ga so special de) or that they are the only one who they miss.

Producer Hiro considered it a great honour to work with Amuro.

== Release ==
The song was first released to radio on October 27, when it was played on the J-Wave "Groove Line" radio show. It was released as a ringtone download on November 18.

The song charted on the Billboard Japan Hot 100 in November and December, charting lowly (generally around #60). it reached its highest week on the November 30 charts, in which is reached #42. The song also peaked on the Billboard Japan Hot Top Airplay/Adult Contemporary Airplay charts at its highest in this week, with #38 and #14 respectively.

== Promotion ==
Amuro in the "Reborn" Vidal Sassoon commercial.

"My Love" was used in the "Reborn" (リボーン, Ribōn) Vidal Sassoon hair product campaign, one of two simultaneous promotional campaigns featuring Amuro. It was the fourth in the series of Vidal Sassoon commercial campaigns that Amuro had undergone with the company, featuring a collaboration between her, American stylist Patricia Field and Cuban hair stylist Orlando Pita. The commercials begun airing from October 1 onwards (14 days earlier than the "Amuroad" campaign featuring the song "Copy That").

The commercial has an outer space theme. It centres around three different scenes: one in which Amuro removes a jewelled space helmet, one in which she floats off into space, and one in which she touches down onto earth, near a Stonehenge-style stone circle monument.

A reference to the theme is found in the song's lyrics: "When you touch me tenderly // it's like I'm in outer space."

== Charts ==
Chart	Peak position
Billboard Japan Hot 100	42
Billboard Adult Contemporary Airplay	14
RIAJ Digital Track Chart Top 100	47
