= Best Fiction =

- Standard edition and digital cover.

Greatest hits album by Namie Amuro
- Released: July 30, 2008
- Recorded: 2002–2008
- Genre: Dance-pop; R&B
- Length: 73:53
- Label: Avex Trax
- Producer: Dallas Austin; Giant Swing; Nao'ymt; Tiny Voice; T.Kura; Michico

Namie Amuro chronology
Play (2007)	Best Fiction (2008)	Past<Future (2009)

Alternative cover
- CD+DVD cover

Singles from Best Fiction
- 1. "60s 70s 80s" Released: March 12, 2008

Best Fiction is the third greatest hits album by Japanese singer Namie Amuro. It was released on July 30, 2008, by Avex Trax and features seventeen singles released between 2002 and 2008, which included five new songs, three of which were released as a triple A-side single called "60s 70s 80s." Furthermore, the album tracks "Do Me More" and "Sexy Girl" were released as digital singles.

Music critics praised Best Fiction for featuring prominent songs from Amuro's music catalogue, as well as her evolution from a Japanese idol performer. However, some publications dismissed certain material for its lasting impression. Despite minor criticism, Best Fiction and its content have received numerous awards and recognition. The album was a major commercial success in Japan, debuting at number one on the Oricon Albums Chart and becoming her first album to sell a million copies since 181920 (1998). To promote the album, Amuro embarked on her Best Fiction Tour that traveled across Japan, China, and Taiwan, which received a home media release the following year.

== Background and content ==
In June 2007, Amuro released her seventh studio album, Play. The album was a critical and commercial success in Japan, peaking at number one on the charts and selling over 500,000 copies. Its commercial success, combined with a string of successful singles, relaunched Amuro's career, which had stalled during the early 2000s. In 2007, Amuro wrapped up her Play promotion with a tour throughout Japan and Taiwan. After finishing her Play Tour, it was announced in early July 2008 that she would release a greatest hits album titled Best Fiction.

Best Fiction is her third compilation album, after Love Enhanced Single Collection (2002) and 181920 (1998). The album features twelve singles released between "Wishing on the Same Star" and her most recent release, "60s 70s 80s" in 2008. "Do Me More," "New Look," "Rock Steady," "What a Feeling," and "Sexy Girl" are among the five new songs on the album. "New Look," "Rock Steady" and "What a Feeling" are influenced by the music decades of the 1960s, 1970s, and 1980s, and sample tracks from each era, those being The Supremes's "Baby Love" (1964), Aretha Franklin's "Rock Steady" (1971) and Irene Cara's "Flashdance... What a Feeling" (1983), respectively.

== Promotion ==
Avex Trax promoted the album with "60s 70s 80s" on March 12, 2008. It is a triple A-side featuring the album tracks "New Look," "Rock Steady," and "What a Feeling," with instrumental versions and music videos included on the physical release. Additionally, the songs were featured in TV commercials promoting Vidal Sassoon products across Japan. The single received positive reviews from music critics and peaked at number one on the Oricon Singles Chart, becoming her first chart-topper in nine years and three months since "I Have Never Seen." The Recording Industry Association of Japan (RIAJ) certified it platinum for shipping over 250,000 units.

The album tracks "Do Me More" and "Sexy Girl" were released as promotional singles in Japan. Both songs received music videos, which were included on the album's DVD formats. "Sexy Girl" was the theme song for the NHK Japanese television drama series Otome no Punch, which aired on June 19, while "Do Me More" was used as a campaigned track to Vidal Sassoon promotions in the country. Only "Do Me More" had chart success in Japan, peaking at 14 on the Billboard Japan Hot 100. However, both songs received RIAJ certifications: "Do Me More" was certified double platinum for ringtone downloads exceeding 500,000 units, as well as platinum for digital sales, whereas "Sexy Girl" was certified gold for more than 100,000 music downloads.

On July 26, 2008, Amuro participated at the 2008 A-nation music concert in front of 25,000 spectators. This was the first time she performed at A-Nation in the concert's history. In the scorching heat of over 30 °C, Amuro appeared as the opening act, performing four songs including her new song "Sexy Girl" and her 1995 song "Chase the Chance." On October 25, 2008, Amuro began her Best Fiction Tour, which traveled through Japan, China, and Taiwan for 60 dates. The tour ended on July 12, 2009, and broke attendance records for a female Japanese singer, with nearly 500,000 spectators between three countries. On September 9, 2009, a live DVD and blu-ray were released to chronicle the tour. It was a commercial success, selling 155,000 copies in its first week, becoming the fastest-selling DVD from a Japanese female soloist. It shifted more than 250,000 units in the country and earned a platinum certification by the RIAJ. After the success of the tour's parent album, NHK invited Amuro to perform at the 59th NHK Kōhaku Uta Gassen, but Amuro declined.

== Release and critical reception ==
Professional ratings
Review scores
Source	Rating
Allmusic	3.5/5 stars
CDJournal	(positive)

Avex Trax released Best Fiction on July 30, 2008. The album artworks were revealed on Oricon, and both covers feature Amuro heavily airbrushed. In Japan, the album was released on CD, with a bonus DVD containing all of the music videos from the parent album. Avex Trax later released both versions of the album in various Asian markets, including Hong Kong, Taiwan, and South Korea. In 2012, Avex Trax reissued the album in two formats: a second limited edition CD commemorating Amuro's 20th career anniversary, and a memory stick packaged in a small box.

Music critics gave Best Fiction positive feedback, with Adam Greenberg of AllMusic rating the album three and a half stars. He praised Amuro's versatility on several tracks, including her energy ("Do Me More"), vocals ("Wishing on the Same Star"), and diverse sound ("Alarm," "Want Me, Want Me"). Although he thought the album was "covered in full detail," he was disappointed with the rest of the material, writing, "There's some standard fare along the way -- items that are sure to hit the charts but leave less lasting impressions." Nonetheless, he concluded that "there's a lot of range covered here, and it all performed quite well." The Japanese magazine CDJournal praised the album's overall sound, citing "Do Me More" and "Sexy Girl" as standouts.

Best Fiction and its content received numerous awards and nominations. At the MTV Video Music Awards Japan, "New Look" was nominated for Video of the Year but won Best Female Video. Additionally, "Sexy Girl" won Best R&B Video. Best Fiction was named one of the top ten albums of 2008 by the Japan Gold Disc Awards, and it also received the Excellence Award. At the 50th Japan Record Awards, Best Fiction won Best Album.

== Commercial performance ==
Commercially, Best Fiction was extremely successful in Japan. The album debuted atop the Oricon Albums Chart, selling 681,187 copies in its first week, becoming her second number-one compilation after 181920. These astounding sales made it have the highest first and second week album sales in 2008 to that point, which was later surpassed by Exile Ballad Best from boy band Exile. In its third week, Best Fiction accumulated sales of 1.092 million copies, making Amuro the only artist to have at least one million-selling album in their teens, twenties, and thirties. Best Fiction eventually spent six consecutive weeks at number one, becoming the first album to do so in over 14 years, dating back to Dreams Come True's 1993 release Magic.

By the end of 2008, it ranked second on Oricon's annual albums chart with 1,447,149 units sold, trailing behind Exile Love by Exile, and had spent 94 weeks on the chart overall. In addition, it was the second best-selling digital album by a Japanese artist on the iTunes Japan's year-end charts behind Hikaru Utada's Heart Station. Best Fiction sold an additional 92,939 copies in 2009, becoming the 95th best-selling album of that year. The Recording Industry Association of Japan (RIAJ) certified the album million for sales exceeding one million units, with Oricon reporting a total of 1,554,654 copies sold in the region. Since Oricon began tracking digital downloads in November 2016, Best Fiction peaked at number two on the Digital Albums chart. According to Oricon Style, Best Fiction is Amuro's sixth best-selling album overall.

== Track listing ==
Track list
No.	Title	Original album	Length
1.	"Do Me More"	New song
2.	"Wishing on the Same Star"	Style
3.	"Shine More"	Style
4.	"Put 'Em Up"	Style
5.	"So Crazy"	Style
6.	"Alarm"	Queen of Hip-Pop
7.	"All for You"	Queen of Hip-Pop
8.	"Girl Talk"	Queen of Hip-Pop
9.	"Want Me, Want Me"	Queen of Hip-Pop
10.	"White Light"	Single
11.	"Can't Sleep, Can't Eat, I'm Sick"	Play
12.	"Baby Don't Cry"	Play
13.	"Funky Town"	Play
14.	"New Look"	New song
15.	"Rock Steady"	New song
16.	"What a Feeling"	New song
17.	"Sexy Girl"	New song

DVD track list
No.	Title	Director(s)	Length
1.	"Do Me More"	Yusuke Tanaka
2.	"Wishing on the Same Star"	Masashi Muto
3.	"Shine More"	Ugichin
4.	"Put 'Em Up"	Ugichin
5.	"So Crazy"	Muto
6.	"Alarm"	Ugichin
7.	"All for You"	Muto
8.	"Girl Talk"	Ugichin
9.	"Want Me, Want Me"	Muto
10.	"White Light"	Muto
11.	"Can't Sleep, Can't Eat, I'm Sick"	Muto
12.	"Baby Don't Cry"	Muto
13.	"Funky Town"	Hidekazu Sato
14.	"New Look"	Yuichi Kodama
15.	"Rock Steady"	Tanaka
16.	"What a Feeling"	Hidekazu Sato
17.	"Sexy Girl"	Kensuke Kawamura

== Charts ==
=== Weekly chart ===
Chart (2008)	Peak position
Japanese Albums (Oricon)	1
Japanese Top Albums (Billboard)	1
Taiwanese Albums (G-Music)	2
Taiwanese J-pop Albums (G-Music)	1

=== Monthly charts ===
Chart (2008)	Peak position
Japanese Albums (Oricon)	1

=== Yearly chart ===
Chart (2008)	Position
Japanese Albums (Oricon)	2
Worldwide Albums (IFPI)	38

2008 year-end charts for Best Fiction
Chart (2009)	Position
Japanese Albums (Oricon)	95

=== Decade-end charts ===
Chart (2000–2009)	Position
Japanese Albums (Oricon)	41

=== All-time chart ===
Chart	Position
Japanese Albums (Oricon)	132

== Certification and sales ==
Region	Certification	Certified units/sales
Japan (RIAJ)	Million	1,554,654

== Release history ==
Region	Date	Format(s)	Label	Ref.
Japan	July 30, 2008	CD; DVD	Avex Trax	
Hong Kong	2008	CD; DVD	Avex Trax	
South Korea	2008	CD; DVD	Avex Trax	
Taiwan	2008	CD; DVD	Avex Trax	
Japan	2012	CD; memory stick	Avex Trax	
Various	N/A	Digital download; streaming	Avex Trax	

== See also ==
- List of best-selling albums in Japan
- List of Oricon number-one albums of 2008

Preceded by Ketsunopolis 4 (Ketsumeishi)	Japan Record Award for the Best Album; 2008	Succeeded by Shio, Koshō (Greeeen)
