= Hide and Seek (Namie Amuro song) =

Promotional single by Namie Amuro

from the album Play
- Released: June 27, 2007
- Recorded: 2007
- Length: 4:34
- Label: Avex Trax
- Songwriter(s): Nao'ymt

"Hide & Seek" is a song by Japanese singer Namie Amuro from her eighth studio album, Play (2007). It was released as a promotional single from the album on June 27, 2007. It is one of the two new songs (the other being "Hello") to have a music video and is being used to promote the album. It has dance, hip hop, and R&B tones and has a synthesized voice in the verses. Amuro stated in an interview that "Hide & Seek" was the perfect song to open the album because of its "marching band" feel at the beginning of the song. Amuro won the "Best R&B Video" prize for the song at the MTV Video Music Awards Japan 2008.

== Music video ==
The video's theme is featured on the cover of Namie Amuro's album Play. The video features Namie Amuro and six male dancers doing choreography amid cranes. Also, there are small television screens displaying her image upon them while singing. Namie is also seen dancing behind police caution tape, and other times plainly against a blinding white background wearing a sleeveless shirt. At one point during the bridge, she is singing on a motorcycle with the dancers playing trumpets.

== Certifications ==
Certifications for "Hide＆Seek"
Region	Certification	Certified units/sales
Japan (RIAJ) Digital single	Gold	100,000^{*}
Japan (RIAJ) Ringtone	2× Platinum	500,000^{*}
^{*} Sales figures based on certification alone.
