= 60s 70s 80s =

2008 single by Namie Amuro

- CD only cover

Single by Namie Amuro

from the album Best Fiction
- A-side: "New Look" "Rock Steady" "What a Feeling"
- Released: March 12, 2008
- Recorded: 2007
- Studio: Giant Swing Studio Tokyo
- Genre: J-pop
- Length: 22:28
- Label: Avex Trax
- Producers: T.Kura ("New Look"); Muro ("Rock Steady"); Shinichi Osawa ("What a Feeling")

Namie Amuro singles chronology
"Funky Town" (2007)	"60s 70s 80s" (2008)	"Wild / Dr." (2009)

Alternative cover
- CD+DVD cover

"60s 70s 80s" is a triple A-side single by Japanese singer Namie Amuro from her third greatest hits album, Best Fiction (2008). It was released on March 12, 2008, through Avex Trax and consists of the songs "New Look," "Rock Steady" and "What a Feeling," each sampling from a specific decade in music, hence the title.

"New Look" samples the 1964 single "Baby Love" by the Supremes; "Rock Steady" samples the 1971 single "Rock Steady" by Aretha Franklin; and "What a Feeling" samples the 1983 single "Flashdance... What a Feeling" by Irene Cara.

All three songs on "60s 70s 80s" were part of a Vidal Sassoon campaign for its line of hair care products. Patricia Field and Orlando Pita were brought on as creatives for the hair and makeup, respectively, and the music videos from "60s 70s 80s" were re-cut and aired as TV commercials.

The single solidified her comeback following the success of her eighth studio album, Play (2007). "60s 70s 80s" became her first number-one single in over nine years on the Oricon Singles Chart, and her tenth overall. Individually, "New Look" peaked at number-one on the then-newly established Billboard Japan Hot 100, while "What a Feeling" peaked at number 28.

== Background and composition ==
Amuro was thrilled at the chance to reinterpret classic hits, commenting that though her ideas in general weren't always fruitful, the end product of "60s 70s 80s" was as "new and unprecedented" as she had expected. Amuro found the production process difficult as she and her team struggled to find the middle ground in how much of the original composition to sample, seeking the best method to reinterpret these "masterpieces."

"New Look"
"New Look" represents the 1960s with a sample of The Supremes' "Baby Love," one of Amuro's favorite songs.

"Rock Steady"
"Rock Steady" represents the 1970s with a sample of "Rock Steady" by the "Queen of Soul", Aretha Franklin.

"What a Feeling"
"What a Feeling" is a deep house song that draws inspiration from music of the 1980s.

Amuro brought on three producers who each worked on a single song, with Michico receiving co-writing credits on all three. Michico is the sole lyricist on the release, apart from sample credits. "New Look" was produced by T.Kura, and features a sample of "Baby Love" by the Supremes from 1964; Holland–Dozier–Holland received writing credits as a result. The song "Baby Love" is reportedly a prior favorite of Amuro's. Other contenders for sampling included music by the Beatles and Deep Purple. "New Look" references prominent English model Twiggy and the styles popularized during the swinging 60s. Amuro stated that the finished product of "New Look" was just as she had envisioned.

"Rock Steady," produced by Muro, features a sample of the similarly-titled "Rock Steady" by Aretha Franklin from 1971; Franklin received writing credits as a result. Amuro previously worked with Muro when they were both a part of the collective project Suite Chic back in 2002. Amuro sings about an elopement: "I think the '70s was a time when women were becoming stronger, and it was interesting to see how Michico's take on that would be "kakeochi" (駆け落) (laughs). I thought it was unexpectedly bold and cool." The final track, "What a Feeling," is a deep house production by Shinichi Osawa, and features a sample of "Flashdance... What a Feeling" by Irene Cara from 1983; Cara and Keith Forsey received lyrical credits and Giorgio Moroder received compositional credits as a result. It utilizes a military cadence-styled call-and-response in its bridge. Amuro found the melodies to songs from the 1980s to be particularly nostalgic, and thought that its lyrics would resonate with people who dance.

== Release and promotion ==
The single was announced in January 2008. "60s 70s 80s" was billed as a collaboration single between Amuro and the hair care segment of Vidal Sassoon, under an advertising campaign titled "Fashion, Music, Vidal Sassoon". Patricia Field and Orlando Pita were brought on to create period-inspired looks for Amuro; the single's music videos were presented as "collaboration films" with title cards "billing" all three in their respective roles. The videos were re-cut into commercials that began airing that same month.

The music video for "New Look" was directed by Yuichi Kodama, and is a dream sequence where Amuro receives a makeover in mod and space-age inspired fashion with store mannequins coming to life. Patricia Field makes a cameo appearance. "Rock Steady" was directed by Yusuke Tanaka and follows Amuro as a rising star; it was filmed in Los Angeles. "What a Feeling" was directed by Takeshi Nakamura and sees Amuro in a dance battle against a troupe of robots—the most choreography-focused of the three videos from the single.

A launch event was held on January 17, 2008, where Amuro performed a medley of "New Look" and "Rock Steady" in Minato, Tokyo. For the week of January 28 to February 3, 2008, a poster installation featuring 84 life-sized iterations of Amuro was displayed in the Shinjuku underground. It measured 56 meters in length and contained a mechanism where a passerby could hold their mobile phone to the installation and be directed to a website previewing "New Look". "What a Feeling" was the first song to premiere from "60s 70s 80s", being broadcast on J-Wave's Groove Line radio program on February 25, 2008.

The physical single for "60s 70s 80s" was made available in two formats: a CD-only edition containing six tracks (three being instrumentals), and a CD+DVD edition containing three music videos. Different artwork was issued for each format, both photographed by Shoji Uchida. Amuro is depicted covering her chest with a shawl of black feathers in one, and is enveloped in a fur jacket in the other.

== Reception ==
=== Critical reception ===
A writer for CD Journal gave "60s 70s 80s" a favorable review, hailing it as a "feat of artistry" while complimenting Amuro's presence on the tracks. In its track-by-track commentary of the single's parent album, Best Fiction (2008), the website praised "New Look" in being able to modernize its 1960s references, and found Muro's work on "Rock Steady" to be "innovative" in "retaining Aretha's power while emphasizing Amuro's cool beauty side." "Rock Steady" is highlighted as a track pick by AllMusic in their listing for Best Fiction.

=== Commercial performance ===
"60s 70s 80s" debuted at number two on the Oricon Weekly Singles chart, moving 114,719 copies, becoming Amuro's best first-week sales since 2000's "Never End." It ascended to the top of the charts in its second week with 38,162 copies sold, making it her first number-one single after 9 years and 3 months since 1998's "I Have Never Seen" peaked at number-one on January 11, 1999. The single reached number two in its third week, being out sold by 20th Century's "Ore ja Nakya, Kimi ja Nakya" by only 1,686 copies. In December 2008, "60s 70s 80s" was listed as Japan's 18th best-selling CD single of the year. "60s 70s 80s" is ranked as Amuro's seventeenth highest-selling single according to Oricon Style, spending a total of 21 weeks on the charts, and has since shipped approximately 293,097 copies.

"60s 70s 80s" as a whole was certified platinum by the Recording Industry Association of Japan for shipping 250,000 copies nationwide. Individually, "New Look" proved to be the most successful song from the set, receiving a triple platinum certification for ringtone sales in October 2008 and a double platinum certification in digital downloads in January 2014. "What a Feeling" and "Rock Steady" were certified platinum and gold in digital downloads, respectively, in January and July 2014.

"New Look" debuted at number 69 on the then newly-established Billboard Japan Hot 100, during the week of March 5, 2008. It jumped to number 29 the next week, and reached the summit during the week of April 2, 2008. It spent 14 weeks in total on the Hot 100 and ranked at number 12 on the year-end chart. "What a Feeling" debuted and peaked at number 28 during the week of March 19, 2008.

== Live performances ==
"What a Feeling" was initially the only song from "60s 70s 80s" to receive promotion. Amuro performed it for the first time during the March 10, 2008, broadcast of the music program Hey! Hey! Hey! Music Champ, prior to the single release. It was performed on subsequent Music Fighter, CDTV and Utaban appearances throughout March; "New Look" and "Rock Steady" made their televised debut on the April 5, 2008, episode of Music Fair.

All the songs were performed in a concert setting for the first time during the Taiwanese leg of her Play tour on April 12 and 13, 2008. Her record label held an annual shareholder meeting at the Saitama Super Arena on June 22, 2008, where she performed "New Look," "What a Feeling" and "Chase the Chance" to an audience of nearly 9,000. Additionally, "What a Feeling" was a part of her set list at A-Nation, a summer concert series exclusive to her labelmates, in July and August 2008. It was Amuro's first and only appearance in the event's history.

Amuro has performed the three songs on several of her Japan and greater East Asia-based tours, with "What a Feeling" making the most appearances:

- Namie Amuro Play More!! in Taipei (all tracks)
- Namie Amuro Best Fiction Tour 2008-2009 (all tracks)
- Namie Amuro Past<Future Tour 2010 ("Rock Steady" and "What a Feeling")
- Namie Amuro Live Style 2011 ("Rock Steady" and "What a Feeling")
- Namie Amuro 5 Major Domes Tour 2012: 20th Anniversary Best ("New Look")
- Namie Amuro Live Style 2014 ("What a Feeling")
- Namie Amuro Final Tour 2018: Finally ("New Look" and "What a Feeling")

== Track listing ==
Disc 1: CD
No.	Title	Lyrics	Music	Arranger(s)	Length
1.	"New Look" (sample: The Supremes' "Baby Love" from 1964)	Michico, Lamont Dozier, Brian Holland, Eddie Holland	T.Kura, Michico, Lamont Dozier, Brian Holland, Eddie Holland	T.Kura for Giant Swing Productions	3:58
2.	"Rock Steady" (sample: Aretha Franklin's "Rock Steady" from 1971)	Michico, Aretha Franklin	Muro, Michico, Aretha Franklin	Muro (King of Diggin' Production)	3:29
3.	"What a Feeling" (sample: Irene Cara's "Flashdance... What a Feeling" from 1983)	Michico, Keith Forsey, Irene Cara	Shinichi Osawa, Michico, Giorgio Moroder	Shinichi Osawa (Mondo Grosso)	3:49
4.	"New Look" (instrumental)				4:00
5.	"Rock Steady" (instrumental)				3:31
6.	"What a Feeling" (instrumental)				3:47

Disc 2: DVD
No.	Title	Director(s)	Length
1.	"New Look" (music video)	Yuichi Kodama
2.	"Rock Steady" (music video)	Yusuke Tanaka
3.	"What a Feeling" (music video)	Takeshi Nakamura

== Personnel ==
- "New Look"
  - Namie Amuro – vocals
  - Namie Amuro, Tiger, Michico – background vocals
  - T.Kura – all instruments
- "Rock Steady"
  - Namie Amuro – vocals
  - SUI – programming & keys
- "What a Feeling"
  - Namie Amuro – vocals
  - Shinichi Osawa – all instruments

== Production ==
- "New Look"
  - Producer – T.Kura
  - Vocal Producer – Michico
  - Director – Yuichi Kodama
  - Choreographer – Moritsune Morita, Nami Segawa, & Raymond Johnson
- "Rock Steady"
  - Producer – Muro
  - Vocal Producer – Michico
  - Director – Yusuke Tanaka
  - Choreographer – Shun
- "What a Feeling"
  - Producer – Shinichi Osawa
  - Vocal Producer – Michico
  - Director – Takeshi Nakamura
  - Choreographer – Tetsuharu

== Release history ==
Region	Date
Japan	March 12, 2008
South Korea	March 19, 2008

== Charts ==
=== Weekly charts ===
Weekly chart performance for "60s 70s 80s"
Chart (2008)	Peak position
Japan Singles (Oricon)	1
Japan Hot Singles Sales (Billboard)	1

Weekly chart performance for "New Look"
Chart (2008)	Peak position
Japan (Japan Hot 100)	1

Weekly chart performance for "What a Feeling"
Chart (2008)	Peak position
Japan (Japan Hot 100)	28

=== Monthly charts ===
Chart (2008)	Peak position
Japan Singles (Oricon)	6

=== Year-end charts ===
Year-end chart performance for "60s 70s 80s"
Chart (2008)	Position
Japan Singles (Oricon)	18

Year-end chart performance for "New Look"
Chart (2008)	Position
Japan (Japan Hot 100)	12

== Certifications ==
Certifications and sales for "60s 70s 80s"
Region	Certification	Certified units/sales
Japan (RIAJ) Physical	Platinum	293,097

Certifications for "New Look"
Region	Certification	Certified units/sales
Japan (RIAJ) Digital	2× Platinum	500,000^{*}
Japan (RIAJ) Ringtone	3× Platinum	750,000^{*}
^{*} Sales figures based on certification alone.

Certifications for "Rock Steady"
Region	Certification	Certified units/sales
Japan (RIAJ) Digital	Gold	100,000^{*}
^{*} Sales figures based on certification alone.

Certifications for "What a Feeling"
Region	Certification	Certified units/sales
Japan (RIAJ) Digital	Platinum	250,000^{*}
^{*} Sales figures based on certification alone.

== MiSaMo version ==
"New Look"

Single by MiSaMo

from the EP Haute Couture
- Language: Japanese
- Released: October 9, 2024
- Genre: J-pop, doo-wop
- Length: 3:16
- Label: Warner Japan
- Composers: Eddie Holland; Brian Holland; Lamont Herbert Dozier; T.Kura; Michico
- Lyricists: Eddie Holland; Brian Holland; Lamont Herbert Dozier; Michico

MiSaMo singles chronology
"Do Not Touch" (2023)	"New Look" (2024)	"Identity" (2024)

Music video
- "New Look" on YouTube

Japanese sub-unit MiSaMo, composed of Twice's members Mina, Momo, and Sana, recorded a cover of "New Look". It was released on October 9, 2024, through Warner Music Japan, as a pre-release single from the group's second EP Haute Couture, released on November 6, 2024. The remake marks the group's first release since their debut EP Masterpiece in 2023. The song combines pop and retro elements, blending nostalgic aesthetics with contemporary visuals in its music video. MiSaMo's version of "New Look" was nominated for Best of Listeners' Choice: Japanese Song at the 2025 Music Awards Japan.

=== Charts ===
Chart performance for "New Look"
Chart (2024)	Peak position
Japan (Japan Hot 100)	8
Japan Combined Singles (Oricon)	10

=== Certifications ===
Certifications for "New Look"
Region	Certification	Certified units/sales
Streaming
Japan (RIAJ)	Platinum	100,000,000^{†}
^{†} Streaming-only figures based on certification alone.
