= Can't Sleep, Can't Eat, I'm Sick =

Single by Namie Amuro

from the album Play
- A-side: "Ningyo"
- Released: May 17, 2006
- Recorded: 2006
- Genre: Dance-pop
- Length: 3:49
- Label: Avex Trax
- Songwriter: Michico
- Producers: T.Kura; Michico

Namie Amuro singles chronology
"White Light/Violet Sauce" (2005)	"Can't Sleep, Can't Eat, I'm Sick" (2006)	"Baby Don't Cry" (2007)

"Can't Sleep, Can't Eat, I'm Sick" (stylized in all caps) is a song by Japanese singer Namie Amuro. It was released by Avex Trax in Japan alongside "Ningyo" on May 17, 2006, as a double A-single. "Can't Sleep, Can't Eat, I'm Sick" served as the second single from Amuro's eighth studio album Play (2007), but "Ningyo" was excluded from the track list. "Can't Sleep, Can't Eat, I'm Sick" was produced by her two most frequent collaborators at the time: T.Kura and Michico for Giant Swing Productions. Musically, it is an upbeat urban contemporary and dance pop song that features a hefty amount of saxophones. Lyrically, it speaks of a lovesick person who cannot get anything done when he or she thinks about their lover.

Music critics praised the production on "Can't Sleep, Can't Eat, I'm Sick" and compared it heavily to the work of American singer Jennifer Lopez. Commercially, the single performed well in Japan, peaking at number two on the Oricon Singles Chart. The physical format was certified gold by the Recording Industry Association of Japan (RIAJ) for selling over 100,000 units.

To promote "Can't Sleep, Can't Eat, I'm Sick" a music video directed by Masashi Mutō was filmed, which focuses solely on a dance routine. The choreography was done by Shawnette Heard, who choreographed for a number of western singers such as Janet Jackson. Since its release, "Can't Sleep, Can't Eat, I'm Sick" has appeared on several of Amuro's concert tours and subsequent live releases, as well as her greatest hits album Best Fiction (2008), and was re-recorded for her final compilation album Finally (2017).

== Background and composition ==
Following the commercial success of Queen of Hip-Pop (2005), Amuro began working on new music with previous collaborators T.Kura, Michico and Nao'ymt for her eighth studio album, Play (2007). "Can't Sleep, Can't Eat, I'm Sick" reunites her with producers T.Kura and Michico, who crafted many of her early R&B hits since 2003.

The lyrics were written by Michico, who was informed that Amuro was into shoujo manga at the time, and Michico commented that the lyrics reflect the world of high school romance. Amuro recorded the song with Ryosuke Kataoka at On Air Azabu Studio, with T.Kura mixing at Giant Swing Studio. The final project was mastered by Tom Coyne at Sterling Sound in New York City. Musically, the song is an upbeat urban contemporary and dance pop song that features heavy saxophones accents. It has been described as a funky summer dance tune that speaks of lovesickness.

== Release and promotion ==
On May 17, 2006, Avex Trax released "Can't Sleep, Can't Eat, I'm Sick" as a double A-side with "Ningyo" as the second single from Amuro's eighth studio album, Play. "Can't Sleep, Can't Eat, I'm Sick" was used as the commercial song for Dwango's “Iromero Mix DX” and Avex's music distribution site Mu-Mo. "Ningyo" was also used in commercials for Mu-Mo.

For the production of the music video for "Can't Sleep, Can't Eat, I'm Sick," Amuro teamed up with American choreographer Shawnette Heard. Shawnette Heard has danced and choreographed routines for many of the world's biggest musical artists including Madonna, Janet Jackson, Beyonce, Prince, P!nk, Michael Jackson and many more. The promotional video for "Can't Sleep, Can't Eat, I'm Sick" debuted on music channel, VMC on May 1, 2006. Directed by longtime collaborator, Masashi Muto, the video focuses entirely on a dance routine. It is also reminiscent of Kylie Minogue's "Can't Get You Out of My Head" (2001) as a majority of it is filmed in a dark room entirely adorned in lights. It was also filmed on top of a skyscraper roof engulfed in lights from the skyscrapers in the background. The video was named VMC's "Video of the Month" for May and was played in heavy rotation on the channel.

== Live performances ==
The single has been performed on several concert tours conducted by Amuro. "Can't Sleep, Can't Eat, I'm Sick" was performed live on her tour entitled Live Style 2006. The live DVD for that tour was released on February 21, 2007. It was included on Amuro's 2007-2008 Play Tour; it was performed as the sixteenth song from the setlist. The live DVD was released on February 27, 2008. It was included on Amuro's 2008-2009 Best Fiction Tour; the live DVD for the Best Fiction Tour was released on September 9, 2009. The track appeared on her Past<Future concert tour in 2010, and was included on the live release on December 12, 2010. The song also made an appearance at her Live Style concert tour (2014), where it was included on as the last track from the setlist; the live DVD was released on February 11, 2015.

== Reception ==
"Can't Sleep, Can't Eat, I'm Sick" was warmly received by music critics. CDJournal called the song a powerful dance song with the dignity of a Japanese diva that will have everyone on their feet on the floor. Tetsuo Hiraga of Hot Express gave the song a glowing review, stating: "It's a great tune that will make your summer even more exciting and dazzling. It is a number that is truly befitting of the 'Queen of Hip-Pop,' as she has become." Adam Greenberg of AllMusic favourably compared the song's composition to the works of American recording artist, Jennifer Lopez.

Commercially, the single fared well in Japan. "Can't Sleep, Can't Eat, I'm Sick" debuted at number two on the Oricon Singles Chart, with first week sales of 43,548 copies. It dropped to number thirteen the next week, selling 14,327 copies. The single stayed in the top twenty one last week, ranking at number nineteen and selling 8,583 copies. "Can't Sleep, Can't Eat, I'm Sick" ranked in the top 200 for a total of ten weeks. This is her highest charting single from the Play era. Because it sold 79,525 copies in 2006, it became the 125th best-selling single of the year.

== Track listing ==
CD version
No.	Title	Lyrics	Music	Arranger(s)	Length
1.	"Can't Sleep, Can't Eat, I'm Sick"	Michico	T.Kura, Michico	T.Kura	3:46
2.	"Ningyo"	Nokko	Kyohei Tsutsumi	Nao'ymt	3:35
3.	"Can't Sleep, Can't Eat, I'm Sick" (Remix)	Michico	T.Kura, Michico	T.Kura	3:16
4.	"Can't Sleep, Can't Eat, I'm Sick" (Instrumental)	Michico	T.Kura, Michico	T.Kura	3:46
5.	"Ningyo" (Instrumental)	Nokko	Kyohei Tsutsumi	Nao'ymt	3:35
Total length:					17:58

CD/DVD version
No.	Title	Length
1.	"Can't Sleep, Can't Eat, I'm Sick" (Music video)
2.	"Ningyo" (Music video)

== Personnel ==
=== "Can't Sleep, Can't Eat, I'm Sick" ===
- Namie Amuro – vocals
- Michico – background vocals
- Producers – T.Kura & Michico
- Arranger – T.Kura
- Choreographer – Shawnette Heard
- Director – Masashi Muto

=== "Ningyo" ===
- Namie Amuro – vocals
- Nao'ymt – background vocals
- Producers – Nao'ymt
- Arranger – Nao'ymt
- Director – Masashi Muto

== Live performances ==
- Can't Sleep, Can't Eat, I'm Sick
  - May 11, 2006 – Utaban
  - May 15, 2006 – Hey! Hey! Hey!
  - May 19, 2006 – Music Station
  - May 20, 2006 – CDTV
  - May 26, 2006 – Music Fighter
  - May 28, 2006 – MTV VMAJ 2006 Red Carpet Show
  - June 5, 2006 – SMAPxSMAP
  - September 25, 2006 – Hey! Hey! Hey! 13th Year Special

== Charts ==
=== Weekly charts ===
Chart (2006)	Peak position
Japan Singles (Oricon)	2

=== Monthly charts ===
Chart (2006)	Peak position
Japan Singles (Oricon)	15

=== Year-end charts ===
Chart (2006)	Position
Japan Singles (Oricon)	125

== Certifications ==
Region	Certification	Certified units/sales
Japan (RIAJ)	Gold	79,525
