= White Light (Namie Amuro song) =

Single by Namie Amuro

from the album Play
- A-side: "Violet Sauce"
- B-side: "Violet Sauce" (Anotha Recipe)
- Released: November 16, 2005
- Recorded: 2005
- Genre: Christmas
- Length: 5:18
- Label: Avex Trax
- Composer: Nao'ymt
- Lyricist: Nao'ymt
- Producer: Nao'ymt

Namie Amuro singles chronology
"Want Me, Want Me" (2005)	"White Light" (2005)	"Can't Sleep, Can't Eat, I'm Sick" (2006)

"White Light" is a song by Japanese singer Namie Amuro. It was released by Avex Trax in Japan on November 16, 2005, as a double A-single with "Violet Sauce". "White Light" was originally planned to promote Amuro's eighth studio album Play (2007), but it was scrapped from the final track list. Instead, an alternative version of "Violet Sauce" was released. A demo version of the song was sent to Amuro, who decided it needed a warmer tone and reworked it as a Christmas song. It was modified by Nao'ymt, the song's sole composer, producer, and writer. Musically, it is a midtempo Christmas song with lyrics about love and holiday festivities.

Music critics praised Amuro's interpretation of Christmas music with "White Light", noting her vocals and the chorus sections as highlights of the song. Commercially, it performed moderately in Japan, peaking at number seven on the Oricon Singles Chart. The physical format was certified gold by the Recording Industry Association of Japan (RIAJ) for exceeding 100,000 units, while the digital version of "White Light" was certified gold for selling more than 100,000 copies in the region.

A music video was filmed by Masashi Muto and features Amuro in a "romantic world", as noted by the singer, and was visually inspired by the Christmas season. It also served as the commercial theme for the Japanese ringtone service Dwango Iromelo Mix. Since its release, "White Light" has appeared on Amuro's greatest hits album Best Fiction and her ballad-inspired compilation album Ballada (album) (2014). It was also included on three of Amuro's concert tours and subsequent live albums.

== Background and composition ==
Following the commercial success of Queen of Hip-Pop (2005), Amuro began working on new music with previous collaborators T.Kura, Michico, and Nao'ymt for her eighth studio album, Play (2007). In mid-September 2005, Japanese publications reported Amuro's involvement in the Japanese release of the 2005 American neo-noir crime anthology film Sin City, for which she provided the theme song. Amuro confirmed this on her website in early October, announcing that "Violet Sauce" would serve as the film's theme song in Japan and would initially be released as a single. However, "Violet Sauce" was announced as a double A-side with "White Light", along with its release date and formats.

The original demo sent to Amuro differed from the final product. To give the track a "warm[er]" vibe, she changed the tone to a Christmas song. She enlisted Nao'ymt, who rewrote some of the lyrics to give it a Christmas feel while also arranging, composing, and producing the entire track. During the recording sessions, Amuro had to record the chorus multiple times to ensure her vocals overlapped in the final recording. Tsutomu Toyama eventually mixed the song, which Yasuji Maeda mastered. Musically, it is a midtempo Christmas song with R&B and pop influences, and the lyrics address themes of love and holiday festivities.

== Release ==
"White Light" was first announced in early October 2005, a month after "Violet Sauce" was confirmed, and both songs were planned by Avex Trax to be the first single to Play. Prior to its release, a promotional disc was released in Japan, which included full-length and short-length versions of "White Light" as well as the original edit of "Violet Sauce". On November 16, 2005, the label released it in both physical and digital formats. Each format contains both tracks, an alternate version of "Violet Sauce" called Anotha Recipe, and instrumental versions of the original tracks.

That same month, the CD single was released in China and Hong Kong. The artwork features Amuro in a coat sitting in the centre of a gold wreath. A similar photograph was used on the cover of Amuro's video album Filmography 2001-2005 (2005). When Amuro's album Play was announced, a remixed version of "Violet Sauce" titled Spicy was included on the track list instead of "White Light". A song called "Nobody" was supposed to appear on the single as a B-side and sequel to "White Light". However, the idea was dropped and it later appeared as a B-side to Amuro's single "Baby Don't Cry".

== Reception ==
Music critics gave “White Light” positive reviews. The Japanese magazine CDJournal reviewed the single's standalone release as well as its appearance on Amuro's greatest hits album Best Fiction (2008) and her ballad-inspired compilation album Ballada (album) (2014). The single was praised for its "heartwarming" qualities and "profound chorus", and it was described as "suitable for the winter season". Its appearance on Best Fiction was praised for Amuro's "warm" singing abilities, whereas its inclusion on Ballada was praised for its "stylish" and "attractive" qualities. When reviewing its inclusion on Ballada, FanPlus contributor Kanako Hayakawa praised the songs R&B influences, but described it as a "typical ballad".

Commercially, it was a moderate success in Japan. "White Light" and "Violet Sauce" debuted at number seven on the Oricon Singles Chart and sold 31,325 units in their first week. It was her lowest-charting position since 2003, when "Put 'Em Up" peaked at the same spot. It stayed on the charts for 10 weeks and sold 72,652 copies in the country. The Recording Industry Association of Japan (RIAJ) certified the physical version gold for exceeding 100,000 sales in Japan, while "White Light" received gold for more than 100,000 digital downloads.

== Promotion ==
Still from the music video showing Amuro in a room full of candles.

The music video for “White Light” was directed by Masashi Muto, and showcases Amuro in a "romantic world" inspired by Christmas. Shots filmed for the video include Amuro standing outside a balcony window with a Christmas tree inside, sitting in a room with several lit candles placed on the floor, singing the song in an alleyway, and singing the song in a coat on a rooftop. (Note: "White Light" video description taken from its appearance on the DVD version of Best Fiction (2008)) During the scene with Amuro in the room with candles, filming had to temporarily halt as one of the cameras melted due to the exposure of the heat from the candle light. The video was included on the DVD version of Best Fiction and Filmography 2001-2005.

To promote “White Light”, it was used as a commercial theme for the Japanese ringtone service Dwango Iromelo Mix. Amuro’s song “Nobody” uses similar composition and lyrics from “White Light”, which was also composed, produced and written by Nao’ymt, and was added as a B-side to “Baby Don’t Cry”. The song was added to Best Fiction, while both the song and music video were also included on Ballada. Since its release, “White Light” has appeared on three of Amuro's concert tours and subsequent live releases. Amuro released a follow-up Christmas song titled "Christmas Wish" in 2016, which appeared on her final compilation album Finally (2017).

== Formats and track listing ==
CD / digital / streaming formats

1. "White Light" – 5:17
2. "Violet Sauce" – 4:03
3. "Violet Sauce" (Anotha Recipe) - 3:25
4. "White Light" (Instrumental) – 5:17
5. "Violet Sauce" (Instrumental) – 4:03

== Credits and personnel ==
Credits adapted from the liner notes of "White Light"/"Violet Sauce".

Locations

- Mixed at Sony Music Studios and Daimonion Recordings (Tokyo, Japan).

Personnel

- Namie Amuro – vocals, background vocals
- Nao’ymt - arranger, composer, songwriter, producer
- Ryuichi Shirota - art director, designer
- Katsunori Ishibashi - designer
- Keiko Miyazawa - stylist
- Mihoko Tanaka - stylist
- Akemi Nakano - hairstylist, makeup artist
- Eriko Ishida - hairstylist, makeup artist
- Shoji Uchida - photographer
- Yasuji Maeda - audio master
- Tsutomu Toyama - audio mixer

== Charts ==
=== Weekly charts ===
Chart (2005)	Peak position
Japan Singles (Oricon)	7

=== Monthly charts ===
Chart (2005)	Peak position
Japan Singles (Oricon)	18

== Certifications ==
Region	Certification	Certified units/sales
Japan (RIAJ) CD version.	Gold	72,652
Japan (RIAJ) White Light (digital)	Gold	100,000^{*}
^{*} Sales figures based on certification alone.

== Release history ==
"White Light"/"Violet Sauce" release history
Region	Date	Format	Label	Ref(s).
Japan	November 16, 2005	CD single; digital download	Avex Trax	
China	November 16, 2005	CD single; digital download	Avex Trax	
Hong Kong	November 16, 2005	CD single; digital download	Avex Trax	
Various	N/A	Digital download; streaming	Avex Trax; Dimension Point	
