= Baby Don't Cry (Namie Amuro song) =

- CD only cover

Single by Namie Amuro

from the album Play
- B-side: "Nobody"
- Released: January 24, 2007
- Recorded: 2006; On Air Azabu Studio (Minato-ku, Tokyo)
- Genre: Sunshine pop; R&B
- Length: 5:22
- Label: Avex Trax
- Songwriter: Nao'ymt
- Producer: Nao'ymt

Namie Amuro singles chronology
"Can't Sleep, Can't Eat, I'm Sick/Ningyo" (2006)	"Baby Don't Cry" (2007)	"Funky Town" (2007)

Alternative cover
- CD+DVD cover

"Baby Don't Cry" is a song by Japanese recording artist Namie Amuro. It was released as the third single from her eighth studio album, Play (2007). It was written, composed, arranged, and produced by Japanese musician Naoaki Yamato, under the alias Nao'ymt. The single also included the B-side track "Nobody," a reworked version of her 2005 song "White Light." "Baby Don't Cry" premiered on January 24, 2007. It was also released worldwide on February 21, 2007, through Avex Inc. Musically, "Baby Don't Cry" is an mid-tempo sunshine pop song influenced by R&B music.

Upon its release, the track garnered generally favorable reviews from music critics, who highlighted the song as one of Amuro's best singles, and commended the production and her vocals. It achieved success in Japan, peaking at number three on the Oricon Singles Chart. The single has been certified within three different categories by the Recording Industry Association of Japan (RIAJ): triple platinum for digital sales, million in chaku-uta (ringtone) and gold in physical shipments. An accompanying music video was shot by long-time music video director Masashi Muto, which features Amuro walking and singing around a city during wintertime. With additional promotion through Japanese commercials and television shows, the song has been performed on several concert tours by Amuro, including her 2007 Play tour, the 2008 Best Fiction Tour and her final tour Namie Amuro Final Tour 2018 ~Finally~ (2017–2018).

== Background and release ==
"Baby Don't Cry"
A sample of "Baby Don't Cry," which is a sunshine pop number that draws influences from R&B music

On December 28, 2006, Japanese magazine CD Journal confirmed the release of a new single, entitled "Baby Don't Cry." It was written, composed, arranged, and produced by Japanese musician Naoaki Yamato, under the alias Nao'ymt. The song was recorded in 2006 at On Air Azabu Studio, Minato-ku, Tokyo by Toshihiro Wako. The song contains backing vocals by Japanese vocalist Hiromi. The single also included the B-side track "Nobody," a reworked version of "White Light." It was intended to appear on Amuro's eighth studio album, Play, as the original version was omitted. However, the re-recorded version did not end up on the final track list for unknown reasons. It premiered on January 24, 2007, as the third single from the album in Japan. It was also released worldwide on February 21, 2007, through Avex Inc.

The CD single contains both "Baby Don't Cry" and "Nobody," plus shortened versions of the tracks. These versions were used for various Japanese television commercials. The CD artwork features a close-up shot of Amuro's face, whilst the DVD single has a close up with her eyes closed. The DVD single includes the music video to "Baby Don't Cry." Both formats features an extra lyric booklet, printed on plain white paper. Musically, "Baby Don't Cry" is an mid-tempo sunshine pop song influenced by R&B music. Japanese music editor Random J compared the composition to the works of American recording artist, Janet Jackson. CD Journal staff member's felt the song's composition was "simplistic," and described the lyrical content as "painful."

== Critical response ==
Upon its release, "Baby Don't Cry" received positive reviews from most music critics. Staff members from Amazon were positive in their review, labeling the song and Amuro's vocal delivery as "impressive." They also complimented Nao'ymt's "perfect" collaboration with Amuro. An editor writing from CD Journal praised the song's mixture of R&B and pop genres. They also felt it was a "classic representation" of Amuro's music inside of the 21st century. AllMusic's editor Adam Greenberg commended the song's departure from the album's electronic music, saying "'Baby Don't Cry' finally gives a peek at Amuro's vocals with less electronic additions...." AllMusic staff selected the single as one of Amuro's best songs in her discography.

== Commercial performance ==
Commercially, "Baby Don't Cry" was successful in Japan. It debuted at number three on the Oricon Daily Singles Chart, and stayed there for four days. This resulted in a debut position of number three on the weekly Oricon Singles Chart, two positions behind entries by Mr. Children and Masafumi Akikawa; it sold 52,168 units within its first week of sales. This became Amuro's first single in six years to sell over 50,000 units in its first week since "Say the Word." With this release, Amuro accomplished 13 consecutive years in the top 10 of the Oricon Singles Chart, a record that had stood since her solo debut single “Taiyou no Season” (1995), thus surpassing the record of 12 consecutive years held by Kyoko Koizumi and Shizuka Kudo. The following week, "Baby Don't Cry" fell to number four with 24,643 units sold within its second week of sales. It slipped again to number seven with 18,663 units sold in its third week of sales, and had its last top ten appearance the following week at number nine; it sold 13,088 units. It lasted 15 weeks in the Top 200 chart, and sold 144,081 units by the end of 2007; it ranked at number 48 on Oricon's Annual Singles Chart. This became Amuro's highest selling single since "Say the Word" (with 184,000 units sold). The CD single for "Baby Don't Cry" was certified gold by the Recording Industry Association of Japan (RIAJ) for shipments of 100,000 units.

The single was certified million in May 2007 by the RIAJ for ringtone sales of one million units in Japan, making this is her first single to be certified million by the RIAJ since her 1997 single "How to Be a Girl" a decade prior, and her sixth overall. By March 2017, it was certified triple platinum by the RIAJ for full-length downloads of 750,000 units. "Baby Don't Cry" was Amuro's best-selling song digitally, until it was surpassed in 2011 when "Love Story" was certified million for ringtone and full-length downloads of one million units each. On September 19, 2018, hot on the heels of her retirement, "Baby Don't Cry" peaked at number 24 on the Billboard Japan Hot 100.

== Live performances and music video ==
A scene from the music video for "Baby Don't Cry" features Namie Amuro walking around the city.

The single has been performed on several concert tours conducted by Amuro, and has appeared on Japanese commercials and television series. "Baby Don't Cry" made its debut live performance on her Play Tour 2007, which was in support of the album with the same title. The live DVD was released on February 27, 2008. It was included on Amuro's 2008-2009 Best Fiction Tour; it was performed as the final song from the setlist. The live DVD was released on September 9, 2009. The track appeared on her Past<Future concert tour in 2010, and was included on the live release on December 12, 2010. In celebration of Amuro's 20th music career anniversary, the single was included on her 5 Major Dome concert tour in Japan; the song was performed as an encore track. The live DVD was released on February 27, 2013. The song also made an appearance at her Live Style concert tour (2014), where it was included on as the last track from the setlist. The live DVD was released on February 11, 2015. "Baby Don't Cry" was included in the setlist for her tour LIVEGENIC 2015–2016; the live DVD and Blu-ray of LIVEGENIC 2015–2016 were released on March 2, 2016. Before the singer's official retirement in 2018, the song made an appearance on her final tour called Namie Amuro Final Tour 2018 Finally; the live DVD and Blu-ray for the tour were released on August 29, 2018.

"Baby Don't Cry" was used as the theme song for the Fuji TV television series, Secret Garden(dorama Himitsu no Hanazono)(2007). Alongside this, it was included in Japanese commercials: the Avex Trax "Myu-Umo" music commercial, the Pokemero Joysound commercial. An accompanying music video for "Baby Don't Cry" was directed by Masashi Muto. It opens with Amuro running on outdoor steps, and walking along a pavement bridge. As the chorus starts, intercut scenes of trees are shown, as she walks through the city. The second verse has her walking through a park, with yellow-ish leaves on the ground. She witnessed two small children on a park bench, holding the chain to a dog. The third chorus then has her walking through a city square, and ends with her standing on a beach front at sunset. A short version of the video was uploaded on Amuro's YouTube page on November 16, 2011, whilst a full version was uploaded one month later.

== Track listings and formats ==
- Japanese CD single
1. "Baby Don't Cry" – 5:22
2. "Nobody" – 4:46
3. "Baby Don't Cry" (TV Mix) – 5:22
4. "Nobody" (TV Mix) – 4:46
- Japanese DVD single
1. "Baby Don't Cry" – 5:22
2. "Nobody" – 4:46
3. "Baby Don't Cry" (TV Mix) – 5:22
4. "Nobody" (TV Mix) – 4:46
5. "Baby Don't Cry" (Music video) – 5:25
- Digital download
1. "Baby Don't Cry" – 5:22
2. "Nobody" – 4:46

== Credits and personnel ==
Credits adapted from the liner notes of the Play album.

Recording

- Recorded at On Air Azabu Studio, Minato-ku, Tokyo (2006).

Personnel

- Namie Amuro – vocals, background vocals
- Naoaki "Nao'ymt" Yamato – songwriting, composition, producing, arranging
- Toshihiro Wako – recording
- Yoshiaki Onishi – mixing
- Hiromi – background vocals
- Vision Factory – management
- Masashi Muto – video director

== Charts ==
=== Weekly charts ===
Chart (2007)	Peak position
Japan Singles (Oricon)	3

Chart (2018)	Peak position
Billboard Japan Hot 100	24

=== Year-end charts ===
Chart (2007)	Position
Japan Singles (Oricon)	48

== Certifications ==
Region	Certification	Certified units/sales
Japan (RIAJ) Physical	Gold	144,081
Japan (RIAJ) Digital	3× Platinum	750,000^{*}
Japan (RIAJ) Ringtone	Million	1,000,000^{*}
^{*} Sales figures based on certification alone.

== Release history ==
Region	Date	Format	Label
Japan	January 24, 2007	CD single; DVD single; digital download	Avex Trax; Avex Entertainment Inc.
United States	February 21, 2007	Digital download	Avex Entertainment
Australia	February 21, 2007	Digital download	Avex Entertainment
New Zealand	February 21, 2007	Digital download	Avex Entertainment
Canada	February 21, 2007	Digital download	Avex Entertainment
United Kingdom	February 21, 2007	Digital download	Avex Entertainment
Germany	February 21, 2007	Digital download	Avex Entertainment
Ireland	February 21, 2007	Digital download	Avex Entertainment
France	February 21, 2007	Digital download	Avex Entertainment
Spain	February 21, 2007	Digital download	Avex Entertainment
Taiwan	February 21, 2007	Digital download	Avex Entertainment

== See also ==
- "White Light" – Corresponding song that relates to B-side track, "Nobody."
