= Funky Town (Namie Amuro song) =

- CD only cover

Single by Namie Amuro

from the album Play
- B-side: "Darling"
- Released: April 4, 2007
- Length: 17:38
- Label: Avex Trax
- Songwriter(s): T.Kura, L.L. Brothers, Michico
- Producer(s): T.Kura & Michico, L.L. Brothers

Namie Amuro singles chronology
"Baby Don't Cry" (2007)	"Funky Town" (2007)	"60s 70s 80s" (2008)

Alternative cover
- CD+DVD cover

"Funky Town" is Namie Amuro's 32nd solo single under the Avex Trax label. It was released in CD and CD&DVD formats on April 4, 2007, three months after the release of her previous single "Baby Don't Cry".

"Funky Town" was ranked #44 on Recochoko's Download Chart and the video was ranked #4 on the PV Download Chart.

== Overview ==
For the release of "Funky Town", Amuro returned to work with frequent married producers Michico and T. Kura. The song is described as being a dancey new number, produced by frequent collaborators T. Kura and Michico along with the L.L. Brothers. The b-side, entitled "Darling," is said to be an adult and stylish dance tune produced by Coldfeet. Also, uncommon for Amuro, first pressing editions of the "Funky Town" single came with a disco ball keychain - the CD&DVD version came with a gold disco ball keychain, and the CD only came with a silver disco ball keychain.

== Commercial endorsements ==
"Funky Town" was used in a new commercial campaign for a redesigned version of the lemon tea Lipton Limone. The new commercial featured Amuro herself and began broadcast on March 20, 2007.

== Music video ==
The promotional video for "Funky Town" found Namie working with director Masāki Uchino (內野政明), instead of long-time director Muto Masashi (武藤真志).

The video begins with the words "Funky Town" on the screen, in the same font seen on the single's cover. The video featured scenes of Namie performing choreography with a group of dancers all wearing black in a black room in featuring a car; dancing against a large screen featuring footage of her face on it; and towards the end singing amid a pile of golden disco balls.

== Track listing ==
CD
No.	Title	Lyrics	Music	Arranger(s)	Length
1.	"Funky Town"	Michico	T.Kura, L.L. Brothers, Michico	T.Kura	3:47
2.	"Darling"	H.U.B.	Lori Fine	Coldfeet	5:03
3.	"Funky Town" (Instrumental)	Michico	T.Kura, L.L. Brothers, Michico	T.Kura	3:47
4.	"Darling" (Instrumental)	H.U.B.	Lori Fine	Coldfeet	4:55
Total length:					17:38

DVD
No.	Title	Director(s)	Length
1.	"Funky Town" (Music video)	Masaaki Uchino

== Personnel ==
- "Funky Town"
  - Namie Amuro – vocals
  - L.L. Brothers, Warner, Michico - additional vocals
  - Giantswing Production (T. Kura, Michico, L.L. Brothers) - productions
- "Darling"
  - Namie Amuro – vocals
  - Coldfeet - productions
  - Lori Fine - keyboards
  - Watusi - programming & instruments
  - Terrassy - guitars

== Production ==
- "Funky Town"
  - Producers – T.Kura, Michico, L.L. Brothers
  - Choreographer - Hirotsugu Kurosu
  - Director - Masaaki Uchino
- "Darling"
  - Producer - Coldfeet

== TV performances ==
- March 16, 2007 - PopJam Reprise
- April 5, 2007 - Sakigake! Ongaku Banzuke SP
- April 6, 2007 - Music Fighter
- April 7, 2007 - CDTV

== Charts ==
Oricon Sales Chart (Japan)

Release	Chart	Peak position	First week sales	Sales total
April 4, 2007	Oricon Daily Singles Chart	2		
April 4, 2007	Oricon Weekly Singles Chart	3	34,292	54,030*
April 4, 2007	Oricon Monthly Singles Chart	14		

== RIAJ certification ==
"Funky Town" has been certified gold for shipments of over 100,000 by the Recording Industry Association of Japan. In 2011 as a ringtone, it has received a double platinum certification, for being downloaded more than 500,000 times.
