= Play (Namie Amuro album) =

Studio album by Namie Amuro
- Released: June 27, 2007
- Recorded: On Air Azabu Studios (Tokyo); Prime Sound Studios (Tokyo); Giant Swing Studios (Tokyo); Tamstar Studios (Tokyo)
- Genres: Pop; R&B; hip-hop
- Length: 50:45
- Label: Avex Trax
- Producers: Namie Amuro (executive); Nao'ymt; T. Kura

Namie Amuro chronology
Queen of Hip-Pop (2005)	Play (2007)	Best Fiction (2008)

Alternative cover
- CD/DVD cover

Singles from Play
- 1. "White Light/Violet Sauce" Released: November 16, 2005; 2. "Can't Sleep, Can't Eat, I'm Sick/Ningyo" Released: May 17, 2006; 3. "Baby Don't Cry" Released: January 24, 2007; 4. "Funky Town" Released: April 4, 2007

Play is the eighth studio album by Japanese recording artist Namie Amuro. It was released on June 27, 2007, by Avex Trax and was made available in both physical and digital formats. Following the success of her previous album, Queen of Hip-Pop (2005), Amuro enlisted long-time collaborators Nao'ymt and T. Kura to produce the album. Play, like its predecessor, is an urban contemporary record with elements of pop music, rock and dance-pop. Lyrically, the record explores themes of love, frustration, and relationships.

Play received positive reviews from music critics; the album was praised for its production standard and sound, while its dance-oriented content and overall energy received minor criticism. Play was a commercial success in Japan, debuting at number one on the Oricon Albums Chart and ranking in the top 20 of the year's album sales in the country. The album was also certified double platinum by the Recording Industry Association of Japan (RIAJ) for exceeding 500,000 unit shipments.

Play spawned four singles: the double A-side "White Light/Violet Sauce," "Can't Sleep, Can't Eat, I'm Sick/Ningyo," "Baby Don't Cry," and "Funky Town." Various tracks from the album were also promoted in commercial campaigns throughout Japan. Amuro promoted Play by embarking on her Play Tour 2007, which included dates in Japan and Taiwan; a live DVD and Blu-ray were released to chronicle the concert tour.

== Background and production ==
Following a period of declining sales, Japanese singer Namie Amuro released her seventh studio album Queen of Hip-Pop in summer 2005. Queen of Hip-Pop received positive feedback from music critics for introducing a more mature and transatlantic sound in contrast to her previous efforts, alongside Amuro's adaption to the R&B and Hip-Hop trend that became popular in Japan at the time. Commercially, it was a success in her home country, reaching number two on the Oricon Albums Chart and being certified double platinum for exceeding 500,000 unit shipments. Work on her follow-up began after she finished her Space of Hip-Pop concert tour throughout Japan.

Amuro and her label, Avex Trax, enlisted previous collaborators Nao'ymt and T. Kura to assist with the album. They were credited as the only main producers on the record, alongside Amuro, while additional collaborator Michico helped co-write many songs and produce Amuro's vocals on the album. The majority of the album's songwriting was overseen by Nao'ymt and Michico, with assistance from the L.L. Brothers and Angie Irons on two separate songs. Between 2005 and 2007, the album was recorded in various studios in Tokyo, Japan, and was mastered by Tom Coyne at Sterling Sound in New York City.

== Composition ==
Like its predecessor, Play is a R&B-influenced record with elements of pop music, rock, dance-pop, and hip-hop. According to AllMusic's Adam Greenberg, the album "was a windfall of basic R&B-flavored dance pop." "The fundamental difference between her previous albums and Play was Amuro's significant shift from being primarily a ballad singer to taking on more ambitious dance-pop," he added about Amuro's sonic transition. According to a CDJournal review, each track on the album was inspired by hip-hop.

The album begins with "Hide & Seek," a bouncy R&B number that includes synthesizers and marching band percussion. "Full Moon" is a dark, atmospheric number that features finger snapping and ambient sounds. "Can't Sleep, Can't Eat, I'm Sick" is an uptempo urban song that has been compared to the works of American singer Jennifer Lopez, while "It's All About You" is a rock-influenced track that lyrically touches on relationship frustrations.

"Funky Town" is a "groovy" J-pop number featuring Amuro's "smooth" vocal deliveries, whereas "Step With It" is an uptempo R&B song co-written and arranged by the L.L. Brothers. "Hello," an uptempo R&B number, is another track on the album that discusses relationship issues, using telecommunications as a metaphor to express their feelings. "Should I Love Him?" is the album's sole ballad, and it addresses the fear of love in a relationship. "Top Secret" and "Violet Sauce (Spicy)" both return to the uptempo sound that was featured throughout the first half of the album, but are followed by the midtempo pop number, "Baby Don't Cry." The album's closer, "Pink Key," is influenced by pop music and finishes the albums overall uptempo rhythm.

== Release and formats ==
Play was released on June 27, 2007, her seventh studio album overall. The album contains 12 songs totalling over 50 minutes in length. Five music videos were included on a DVD format: "Hide & Seek," "Can't Sleep, Can't Eat, I'm Sick," "Funky Town," "Hello" "Baby Don't Cry." In addition, a special movie video featuring Amuro was created in collaboration with the anime series The World of Golden Eggs. Play was released in various Asian countries in July 2007, with Avex Trax releasing it in Taiwan, Hong Kong, and Indonesia, and S.M. Entertainment releasing it in South Korea.

To commemorate Amuro's 20th career anniversary, the album was reissued in two formats in Japan in 2012: a standard CD with the original content but at a lower retail price, and a Playbutton format. Shoji Uchida shot the album artwork and photoshoot; the CD artwork depicts Amuro in a blue policewoman uniform holding a whip, while the bonus DVD artwork depicts Amuro in a black and white policewoman uniform holding the same whip. The art direction and the album's booklet was designed by Hidekazu Sato and Katsuhiro Shimizu, with creative direction handled by Sato.

== Promotion ==
Although Amuro's previous album did not promote TV performances, for this album, “Hide & Seek” and “Hello” were performed on various music programs, starting with Music Station, where the singer appeared for the first time in about a year. In addition, she was selected as MTV's “artist of the month” for June, and was featured in a special program on MTV. To celebrate the release of the album, she appear as a radio personality on Nippon Broadcasting System's All Night Nippon and invited 100 fans to an open recording session on June 16. The recording was broadcast on air as “Namie Amuro's All Night Nippon” on Monday, June 25 at 1:00 am. On July 1, the week of the album's release, a special hangar stage was set up at a heliport in Urayasu, Chiba Prefecture, and a secret live performance was held exclusively for those who purchased the album at Tsutaya. The location was chosen to match the album's concept of a near-future city and aggressive image; 300 pairs of 600 people were invited free of charge by lottery from among approximately 20,000 applications, and Amuro performed five songs from the album on a stage surrounded by three helicopters equipped with Play specifications. On July 14, Amuro appeared on FM North Wave's public live broadcast at Sapporo Factory, attracting a total of 3,000 people to the venue. Before the live broadcast, a Play wrapped bus carrying listeners was brought to greet her, and in the evening, a public recording took place at Sapporo Station's "Eki☆Sta." In addition, a Play wrapped bus was also used for the Play campaign from August 2, running in four cities across Japan (Sapporo, Nagoya, Osaka, and Fukuoka).

=== Singles and other songs ===
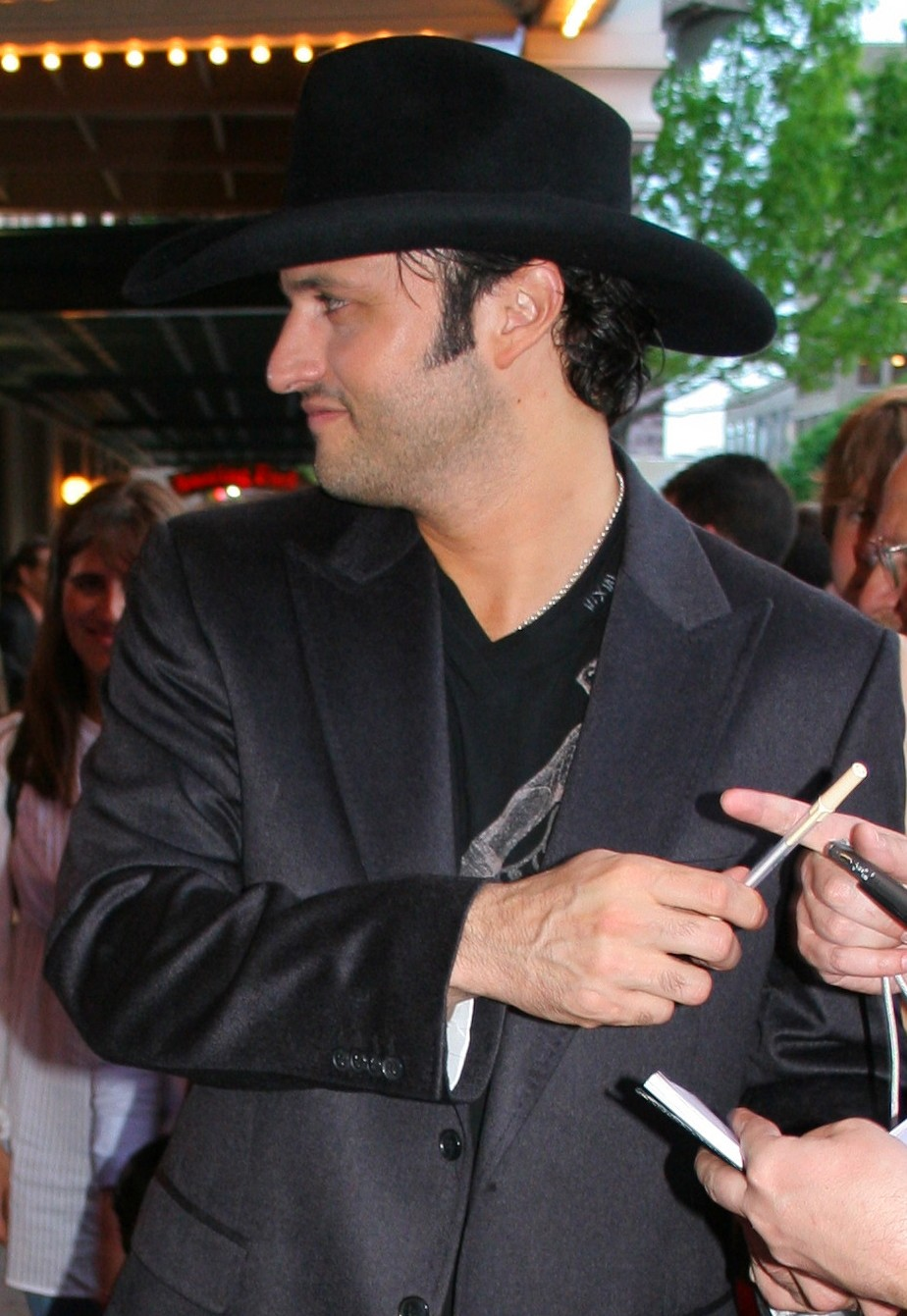
Amuro's song "Violet Sauce" was included in Robert Rodriguez's (pictured) 2005 film Sin City.

Four singles were released to promote Play. The double A-side single "White Light" was released as the album's lead single on November 16, 2005, through Avex Trax. Despite its commercial release, "White Light" did not appear on the track list for Play, and was later added to Amuro's greatest hits album Best Fiction (2008). The single peaked at number seven on the Oricon Singles Chart, and was certified gold by the Recording Industry Association of Japan (RIAJ) for exceeding 100,000 unit shipments. The albums second A-side singles, "Can't Sleep, Can't Eat, I'm Sick/Ningyo," was released on May 17, 2006, through Avex Trax. The latter track, like its predecessor, was not included on the Play track list. The single peaked at number two on the Oricon Singles Chart, and was certified gold in Japan.

"Baby Don't Cry" was released as the albums third single by Avex Trax on January 24, 2007. Commercially, the song peaked at number three on the Oricon Singles Chart, and number 26 on the Billboard Japan Hot 100. In Japan, the song received three certifications: gold for physical sales, triple platinum for exceeding 750,000 digital downloads, and million for exceeding one million ringtone downloads. "Funky Town" was released as the fourth and final single by Avex Trax on April 4, 2007. Physical and digital formats also included the B-side song "Darling," which did not appear on Play. "Funky Town" peaked at number three on the Oricon Singles Chart, and received three certifications in Japan; gold for physical sales, gold for exceeding over 100,000 digital downloads, and double platinum for exceeding over 500,000 ringtone downloads. "Hide & Seek" was not retailed as a single in Japan, but was certified in two categories: double platinum for exceeding 500,000 ringtone sales, and gold for selling over 100,000 digital downloads. The music video for "Hide & Seek" won the "Best Female Video" award at the Space Shower Music Awards 08 and the "Best R&B Video" award at the MTV Video Music Awards Japan 2008.

Several songs from the album were used in commercials and advertisements promoted in Japan. "Hide & Seek," "Can't Sleep, Can't Eat, I'm Sick" and "Hello" were used in commercials for the Japanese ringtone websites Mu-Mo and Iromelo Mix DX, while "Funky Town" and "Pink Key" were used as jingles in Japan to promote Lipton products. "Top Secret" was used as the theme song for the second season of Prison Break in Japan, while "Baby Don't Cry" is featuring as the ending theme song for the Fuji Television series, Himitsu no Hanazono. Additionally, the single release of "Violet Sauce" was featured as the theme song for the Japanese release of the 2005 American neo-noir crime anthology film Sin City. The movie's director, Robert Rodriguez, was impressed by the song and asked to be a part of it; he can be heard saying "Welcome to Sin City" towards the end of the song.

=== Play Tour 2007 ===
Play Tour
- Tour by Namie Amuro
- Associated album: Play
- Start date: August 18, 2007
- End date: April 13, 2008
- Legs: 3
- No. of shows: 67

Namie Amuro concert chronology
- Live Style 2006 (2006); Play Tour (2007-2008); Best Fiction Tour (2008-2009)

Amuro embarked on her Play Tour 2007 concert tour to promote the album. The tour began on August 18, 2007, at Ichihara Civic Hall in the Chiba Prefecture, and was originally scheduled to end on December 25, 2007, at the Okinawa Convention Theatre in Amuro's hometown of the Okinawa Prefecture. The tour was extended by 12 dates, beginning its second leg, titled Play More!!, at Nagoya Century Hall in Nagoya and concluding on February 27, 2008, at Kanagawa Kenmin Hall in Yokohama. In addition, Amuro added an international date in Taipei, Taiwan at the Taipei Arena on April 12 and 13, 2008. This became Amuro's longest spanning concert tour at that point.

The setlist included songs from Amuro's musical career, including every track from "Play." On February 27, 2008, Avex Trax released a live DVD in Japan, and a Blu-ray was released two years later on December 15, 2010. Both physical formats were re-released on September 16, 2012, as part of Amuro's 20th career anniversary, with the original content but at a lower retail price. Commercially, the DVD release was a success in Japan, peaking at number two on the Oricon DVD Chart, and lasted 65 weeks in total. The live release was certified gold by the Recording Industry Association of Japan (RIAJ) for exceeding 100,000 unit shipments.

Namie Amuro Play Tour 2007 DVD/Blu-ray track list
1. "Hide & Seek"
2. "Full Moon"
3. "It's All About You"
4. "Butterfly"
5. "Darling"
6. "Come"
7. "Luvotomy"
8. "Should I Love Him?"
9. "Girl Talk"
10. "Funky Town"
11. "Hello"
12. "Ningyo"
13. "Baby Don't Cry"
14. "Step With It"
15. "Chase the Chance"
16. The World of Golden Eggs Special Movie
17. "Can't Sleep, Can't Eat, I'm Sick"
18. "Want Me, Want Me"
19. "Violet Sauce (Spicy)"
20. "Top Secret"

Encore

21. "Pink Key"
22. "Can You Celebrate?"
23. "Say the Word" (Breeze House Mix)

== Reception ==
Professional ratings
Review scores
Source	Rating
AllMusic	3.5/5 stars
CD Journal	(neutral)
MTVChinese.com	4.5/5 stars

Play received positive reviews from music critics. Adam Greenberg from AllMusic awarded the album three-and-a-half stars. Greenberg praised the album's inclusion of R&B sounds and ballads, as well as Amuro's presence on tracks like "Baby Don't Cry," "Hello" and "Hide & Seek." He was critical of the album's dance-oriented content and faltering energy, citing songs such as "It's All About You," "Funky Town," "Top Secret," and "Violet Sauce" as examples. Labelling the effort as "ambitious," he concluded, "The dance tunes don't always hit as squarely as Amuro might hope, but it's a good effort and worth the time of her fans." A mini-review from CD Journal described most of the content on the album as "danceable." A reviewer from MTVChinese.com gave the album a positive analysis, commenting: "Amuro's comeback is just like the comeback of our youthful memories, only she is more mature and stable. This is the golden time for us to play with Namie Amuro." Amuro received the special "Respect Award" at the MTV Student Voice Awards 2007 ceremony in August 2007, which was held at the now-defunct Shinkiba Studio Coast.

Commercially, Play was a success. In Japan, Play debuted at the top of the daily and weekly Oricon Albums Chart, opening with sales of 250,619 copies, Amuro's highest first week sales since Genius 2000 (2000). Additionally, it became Amuro's first studio album to reach number one since Genius 2000, and her fourth overall. Play spent a second consecutive week atop the chart, selling 90,506 copies. In all, it stayed on the charts for 59 weeks. By the end of 2007, the album was named the 15th best-selling record in the country of the fiscal year, having sold 514,560 copies. The album was certified double platinum by the Recording Industry Association of Japan (RIAJ) for shipments of 500,000 units. According to Oricon Style, Play is Amuro's ninth best-selling album overall.

== Track listing ==
CD
No.	Title	Lyrics	Music	Producer(s)	Length
1.	"Hide & Seek"	Nao'ymt	Nao'ymt	Nao'ymt	4:36
2.	"Full Moon"	Nao'ymt	Nao'ymt	Nao'ymt	3:57
3.	"Can't Sleep, Can't Eat, I'm Sick"	Michico	T.Kura, Michico	T.Kura	3:46
4.	"It's All About You"	Michico	T.Kura, Michico	T.Kura	4:12
5.	"Funky Town"	Michico	T.Kura, Michico, L.L. Brothers	T.Kura	3:48
6.	"Step With It"	Michico, L.L. Brothers	T.Kura, Michico, L.L. Brothers	T.Kura	3:47
7.	"Hello"	Angie Irons, Michico	Angie Irons, T.Kura	T.Kura	3:42
8.	"Should I Love Him?"	Michico	T.Kura, Michico	T.Kura	4:25
9.	"Top Secret"	Nao'ymt	Nao'ymt	Nao'ymt	4:30
10.	"Violet Sauce (Spicy)"	Nao'ymt	Nao'ymt	Nao'ymt	4:01
11.	"Baby Don't Cry"	Nao'ymt	Nao'ymt	Nao'ymt	5:21
12.	"Pink Key"	Nao'ymt	Nao'ymt	Nao'ymt	4:40

DVD
No.	Title	Director(s)	Length
1.	"Hide & Seek" (Music video)	Kensuke Kawamura	4:36
2.	"Can't Sleep, Can't Eat, I'm Sick" (Music video)	Shinji Muto	3:49
3.	"Funky Town" (Music video)	Masaaki Uchino	3:44
4.	"Hello" (Music video)	Kensuke Kawamura	3:40
5.	"Baby Don't Cry" (Music video)	Shinji Muto	5:26

DVD: Special Movie
No.	Title	Length
6.	"Amuro Namie x The World of Golden Eggs Special Collaboration Movie" (Gushi-Ken Band feat. Namie Amuro)	7:18

== Personnel ==
Personnel details were sourced from Play's liner notes booklet.

Visuals and imagery

- Hidekazu Sato - Creative Direction, Art Direction
- Katsuhiro Shimizu - Art Direction
- Katsuhiro Shimizu - Design
- Shoji Uchida - Photography
- Noriko Goto - Stylist

Performers and musicians

- Namie Amuro - vocals, background vocals
- Hiromi - additional vocals
- Nao'ymt - additional vocals, multiple instruments
- Michico - additional vocals
- Sam Salter - additional vocals
- T.Kura - multiple instruments
- Orito - additional vocals
- Tiger - additional vocals
- LL Brothers - additional vocals
- Warner - additional vocals
- Jun - additional vocals
- Ring - additional vocals
- Tomoyasu Takeuchi - guitars

Technical and production

- Producers - Nao'ymt, T.Kura, Namie Amuro
- Vocal Producers - Michico, Angie Irons
- Mixing - D.O.I., T.Kura, Yoshiaki Onishi

== Charts ==
=== Weekly charts ===
Chart (2007)	Peak position
Japanese Albums (Oricon)	1

=== Monthly charts ===
Chart (2007)	Peak position
Japanese Albums (Oricon)	1

=== Year-end charts ===
Chart (2007)	Position
Japanese Albums (Oricon)	15

== Certification and sales ==
Region	Certification	Certified units/sales
Japan (RIAJ)	2× Platinum	542,725

== Release history ==
Region	Date	Format	Label
Japan	June 27, 2007	CD; DVD; Digital download	Avex Trax
Worldwide (Note: Play was released as a digital format on June 27, 2007. After Amuro's retirement in 2017, Dimension Point published all of her music on streaming services in mid-2019, including Play. However, in November 2023, Play, alongside the rest of Amuro's music releases, were removed from physical retailers, digital outlets, and streaming services due to unexplained reasons.)	June 27, 2007	Digital download	Avex Trax
Hong Kong	July 2007	CD; DVD	Avex Trax
Indonesia	July 2007	CD; DVD	Avex Trax
Taiwan	July 2007	CD; DVD	Avex Trax
South Korea	July 2007	CD; DVD	S.M. Entertainment
Japan	June 27, 2012	CD; Playbutton	Avex Trax

== See also ==
- List of Oricon number-one albums of 2007
