= All for You (Namie Amuro song) =

Single by Namie Amuro

from the album Queen of Hip-Pop
- B-side: "Butterfly"
- Released: July 22, 2004
- Recorded: 2004
- Studio: Plaza Studio
- Length: 6:00
- Label: Avex Trax
- Songwriters: Natsumi Watanabe, Ryoki Matsumoto
- Producer: Ryoki Matsumoto

Namie Amuro singles chronology
"Alarm" (2004)	"All for You" (2004)	"Girl Talk/The Speed Star" (2004)

"All for You" is a song by Japanese recording artist Namie Amuro. It was released on July 22, 2004, by Avex Trax, and serves as Amuro's second single from her seventh studio album Queen of Hip-Pop (2005). The lyrics were written by Natsumi Watanabe, who had translated "Stop the music" into Japanese for Amuro's 1995 single. The music was composed by Ryoki Matsumoto, known for composing other hit songs at the time such as Rui's "Tsuki no Shizuku" and Mika Nakashima's "Yuki no Hana." Musically, "All For You" is a synthesizer-heavy power ballad.

Music critics praised Amuro's vocals on "All For You," along with the song's melody and production. Commercially, it was a success in Japan, peaking at number six on the Oricon Singles Chart. The song was the first of three consecutive singles to sell over 100,000 copies and was certified gold by the Recording Industry Association of Japan (RIAJ) for sales exceeding 100,000 units. While the digital version of "All For You" was certified gold for selling more than 100,000 legal downloads in the region.

A music video for the song was filmed by Masashi Muto and features Amuro singing alone on a beach in Tateyama City, Chiba Prefecture. The title track was used as the theme song for the dorama Kimi ga Omoide ni Naru no Mai ni. Since its release, "All For You" has appeared on Amuro's greatest hits album Best Fiction and her ballad-inspired compilation album Ballada (2014). It has also been included on three of Amuro's concert tours and subsequent live albums.

== Background and composition ==
"All for You"
"All for You" is a power ballad with lyrics revolving around the theme of unconditional love.

After completing her So Crazy Tour tour, which was her first international tour, Amuro began work on her seventh studio album, Queen of Hip-Pop. Amuro collaborated on the album with Japanese producers and songwriters T.Kura, Michico, and Nao'ymt, as well as Tricky Stewart and Sugi-V. Amuro enlisted Michico to assist her with new music because they had previously collaborated; she was inspired by their work together on her album Style (2003), particularly her song "Namie's Style," and both of them wanted to continue working towards Amuro's transition from dance-oriented music to R&B and hip-hop influences.

"All For You" was written by Natsumi Watanabe, composed by Ryoki Matsumoto and arranged by Jun Abe. Amuro recorded the song with Toshihiro Wako and Eiji Kameda at Plaza Studio, with Junya Endo mixing at Sunrise Studio. The final project was mastered by Tom Coyne. Musically, the song is a power ballad featuring a hefty amount of synthesizers. Amuro stated that it had been a while since she sang a ballad, so she wanted to sing a ballad on the high road once more, so she released "All For You" as a single. Lyrically, the song speaks about unconditional love. Amuro stated that she thought the lyrics were wonderful and suited the ballad. The B-side "Butterfly" is a cheerful and energetic dance tune that uses steel drum echoes throughout the song, creating a tropical mood. The lyrics, which compare the colorful butterflies dancing in the air to a woman's shifting mind, create a bewitching atmosphere.

== Release and promotion ==
Still from the music video for "All For You," which was filmed in Tateyama City

Avex Trax released "All For You" in Japan on July 22, 2004, in digital and physical formats. It serves as the second single from Amuro's seventh studio album Queen of Hip-Pop (2005). The CD single and digital format include the title track and the B-side track "Butterfly," which was written, composed and arranged by Akira. "All For You" served as the theme song to the dorama Kimi ga Omoide ni Naru no Mai ni.

The music video for "All For You" was directed by Masashi Muto; it features Amuro singing alone on a beach in Tateyama City, Chiba Prefecture by a sunset. The song and video were included in Best Fiction, with the video appearing on her video album Filmography 2001-2005 (2005). On July 24 of the same year, she performed with AI at the 2004 MTV Buzz Asia Concert in Seoul, South Korea, representing Japan as a performing artist. She sang “Put 'Em Up,” “Alarm,” and “All For You,” as well as a duet with AI called “Uh Uh,,,,,,,” a collaboration number with AI from the musical project Suite Chic. Upon her arrival at Incheon International Airport the day before, she was greeted by 500 fans, including women dressed in "Amuro" fashion, by singing the chorus of “All For You” in unison. The song is rarely performed live, except at the events mentioned above, and as one of the daily songs on tours such as Space of Hip-Pop, and Namie Amuro Live Style 2014.

== Reception ==
Music critics gave "All For You" positive reviews. Japanese magazine CDJournal reviewed the single and its appearances on Queen of Hip-Pop and Best Fiction. CDJournal praised the single's release as being well-made, but still felt the "mediocre" finish may have backfired, and didn't feel the meaning of her singing. Its appearance on Queen of Hip-Pop was praised for its heart-tugging, tear-jerking melody that matches the theme song for a drama and cuts through the listener's heart like a pure breeze. For Best Fiction, the song was praised for its warm melody and Amuro's soothing vocals. Daniel Robson of Playlouder however dismissed the song as "crushingly dull."

Commercially, the single was a success in Japan. "All For You" debuted at number six on the weekly Oricon Singles Chart, selling 28,003 copies in its first week. It dropped to number eleven the next week, selling 17,511 copies. The single dropped to number fifteen on its third week, selling 11,885 copies. It spent the next two weeks at number eighteen, shifting 10,537 copies on its fourth week, as well as 9,715 copies on its fifth week. The single disappeared from the top twenty the following week. "All For You" remained on the chart for a total of 15 weeks, selling 112,558 units by the end of 2004, with Oricon ranking it as the 86th best-selling single of the year. The Recording Industry Association of Japan (RIAJ) certified the CD single gold in August 2004 for exceeding 100,000 sales in Japan. In January 2014, the digital single was certified gold for selling over 100,000 legal downloads in the country.

== Track listing ==
No.	Title	Writer(s)	Length
1.	"All for You"	Natsumi Watanabe; Ryoki Matsumoto	6:00
2.	"Butterfly"	Akira	4:00
3.	"All for You" (instrumental)	Matsumoto	6:00
4.	"Butterfly" (instrumental)	Akira	3:58

== TV performances ==
- July 7, 2004 – Music Station
- July 16, 2004 – Pop Jam
- July 16, 2004 – AX Music Factory
- July 27, 2004 – CDTV Special
- August 8, 2004 – MTV Buzz Asia Concert
- September 3, 2004 – Music Station
- September 6, 2004 – Hey! Hey! Hey!
- September 9, 2004 – AX Music Factory

== Charts ==
=== Weekly charts ===
Chart performance for "All For You"
Chart (2004)	Peak position
Japan Singles (Oricon)	6

=== Monthly charts ===
Chart (2004)	Peak position
Japan Singles (Oricon)	14

=== Year-end charts ===
Chart performance for "All For You"
Chart (2004)	Position
Japan Singles (Oricon)	86

== Certifications ==
Region	Certification	Certified units/sales
Japan (RIAJ) CD version.	Gold	112,558
Japan (RIAJ) digital	Gold	100,000^{*}
^{*} Sales figures based on certification alone.

== Personnel ==
- Namie Amuro – vocals
- Ryoki Matsumoto – chorus
- Jun Abe – keyboard, piano
- Kenji Suzuki – guitar
- Rush by Takashi Katou – Strings
