= Filmography 2001–2005 =

Video by Namie Amuro
- Released: December 7, 2005
- Recorded: 2001–2005
- Genres: Pop; R&B
- Length: 56 minutes
- Label: Avex Trax
- Directors: Masashi Muto; Ugichin

Namie Amuro chronology
So Crazy Tour Featuring Best Singles 2003–2004 (2004)	Filmography 2001–2005 (2005)	Space of Hip-Pop: Namie Amuro Tour 2005 (2006)

Filmography 2001–2005 is Namie Amuro's third original music video collection and collects most of her videos from "Say the Word" (2001) to "White Light" (2005).

== Track listing ==
1. "Say the Word" (Namie Amuro, Ronald Malmberg, Thomas Johansson) – 4:24
2. "I Will" (Namie Amuro, Hiroaki Hayama) – 6:42
3. "Wishing on the Same Star" (Diane Warren, kenko-p) – 4:53
4. "Shine More" (Scott Nickoley, Sandra Pires, Paul Taylor, H.U.B) – 3:55
5. "Put 'Em Up" (Dallas Austin, Jasper Cameron, Michico) – 4:03
6. "So Crazy" (Full Force, Jennifer "JJ" Johnson, Michico, Tiger) – 4:34
7. "Alarm" (Jusme, Monk) – 4:22
8. "All for You" (Natsumi Watanabe, Ryoki Matsumoto) – 5:58
9. "Girl Talk" (Michico, T.Kura) – 4:25
10. "Want Me, Want Me" (Michico, SUGI-V) – 3:12
11. "WoWa" (Nao'ymt) – 4:15
12. "White Light" (Nao'ymt) – 5:32

== Personnel ==
Numbers in parentheses following listed names corresponded to the track list

- Artist
  - Namie Amuro
- Choreographer
  - Chihiro (TRF) (9)
  - Etsu (TRF) (9)
  - Ken (Da Pump) (11)
  - Yumeko (1)
  - Warner (4,5,6,7,10)
- Dancer
  - Erika (10)
  - Gen (6,10)
  - George (5,10)
  - Hide (11)
  - Hiroko Ishikawa (1)
  - Iyo-P (1)
  - Ken (6)
  - Mako (4,5)
  - Maya (4)
  - Mayumi (6,7,9)
  - Megumi (10)
  - Misa (6)
  - Nazuki (10)
  - Shige (5,6,7)
  - Shinosuke (1)
  - Sonny (5,10)
  - Subaru (7)
  - Rika (4,5,7,9)
  - Ryo (7)
  - Yoshi-Zo (5)
  - Yumeko (1)

== Production ==
- Director:
  - Masahi Muto (1,2,3,6,8,10,11,12)
  - UGICHIN (4,5,7,9)
- Director of Photography:
  - Masashi Muto (1,3,11)
  - Shoji Ueda (2,6,8,10)
  - Takeshi Hanzawa (12)
  - Yuzuru Hashimoto (4,5,7,9)
- Producer:
  - DNA (2)
  - Hayato Murakoshi (4,5,7,9)
  - Hiroshi Yamanouchi (11,12)
  - Keiichi Toyomura (9)
  - Maya Nishimoto (11)
  - Shunsuke Nakamura (10)
  - Sumitaka Fushimizu (1,3,6,8)
  - Yoshiki Ishii (11)
- Lighting:
  - Akifumi Yonei (2,8,10,11)
  - Koji Furuyama (4,5,7,9)
  - Masayuki Ozawa (1,3)
  - Takahiro Tatara (6,12)
- CG:
  - Masami Tanji(11)
  - Takayuki Taketa (12)
  - Yoshiyuki Odajima (11)
- Colorist:
  - Yoshiro Kamei (4,5,7,9)
- Editing:
  - Kim Yung Tae (5,7,9)
  - Kazuhiro Baba (1,2,3,6,8)
  - Kazuya Kurihara (4)
  - Tomoya Sato (12)
  - Toyokazu Tanno (10,11)
- Hair & Make Up:
  - Akemi Nakano (2,3,4,5,10,11,12)
  - Satomi Kurihara (1,6,7,8,9)
- Stylist:
  - Keiko Miyazawa (9)
  - Noriko Goto (1,2,3,4,5,6,7,8,10,11)
  - Tsugumi Watari (12)

== Charts ==
Album - Oricon DVD Sales Chart (Japan)

Release	Chart	Peak position	Sales total
7 December 2005	Oricon Daily General DVD Chart	2	
7 December 2005	Oricon Weekly General DVD Chart	2	130,191
7 December 2005	Oricon Music DVD Chart	1	
7 December 2005	Oricon Weekly Music DVD Chart	1	109,315

== RIAJ certification ==
As of December, 2005 "Filmography 2001-2005" has been certified gold for shipments of over 100,000 by the Recording Industry Association of Japan.
