= Queen of Hip-Pop =

Studio album by Namie Amuro
- Released: July 13, 2005
- Recorded: 2004–2005
- Studios: On Air Azabu Studio; Baybridge Studio; Rojam Studio; Plaza Studio
- Genres: Hip hop; pop; R&B
- Length: 52:28
- Label: Avex Trax
- Producers: T.Kura; Michico; Nao'ymt; Tricky Stewart; Sugi-V

Namie Amuro chronology
Style (2003)	Queen of Hip-Pop (2005)	Play (2007)

Singles from Queen of Hip-Pop
- 1. "Alarm" Released: March 17, 2004; 2. "All for You" Released: July 22, 2004; 3. "Girl Talk/The Speed Star" Released: October 14, 2004; 4. "Want Me, Want Me" Released: April 6, 2005

Queen of Hip-Pop is the seventh studio album by Japanese recording artist Namie Amuro. It was released on July 13, 2005, by Avex Trax. The album's lyrical content, composing and arrangement was handled by multiple music collaborators, such as Nao'ymt, Sugi-V, Michico, Tricky Stewart, T.Kura, among many others. It is her second full-length urban contemporary record, and is made up of songs of various musical genres. Amuro uses the term "hip-pop" to describe the music on the album because it fuses pop music with other genres including R&B and hip-hop music. Three different formats were released to promote the album: a standalone CD, a limited edition Playbutton, and a digital download.

Upon its release, Queen of Hip-Pop received positive reviews from music critics. Commercially, the album was a success in Japan, hitting the second position on the Oricon Albums Chart, and has since been certified double platinum by the Recording Industry Association of Japan (RIAJ) for shipments of over 500,000 units nationwide. The album is considered Amuro's comeback album, being her best-selling record since Genius 2000 (2000), and was her most commercially successful effort in half a decade before Play (2007) was released.

Four singles were released from Queen of Hip-Pop: "Alarm," "All For You," "Girl Talk/The Speed Star" and "Want Me, Want Me." The latter two singles, "Girl Talk/The Speed Star" and "Want Me, Want Me," both peaked at number two on the Oricon Singles Chart. Meanwhile, "Alarm" and "All For You" peaked at number eleven and number six, respectively. Amuro promoted the album by embarking on the Space of Hip-Pop tour, which ran from September to December 2005.

== Background and composition ==
For Queen of Hip-Pop, Amuro's record label Avex Trax hired a wide array of musicians, such as Michico, T.Kura, Sugi-V, Nao'ymt, among many others to work on the album. Those producers are just some of whom worked with Amuro on her preceding album Style (2003). Amuro contributed as the main and background vocalist. While planning the album, Amuro decided she wanted to create music that would have its most profound effect live; the result is an album that is her most up-tempo containing eleven R&B/dance songs and only one ballad. When the album was completed, Amuro said that she had not been able to sing the songs very well yet.

The title track is a bouncy R&B number with a combination of hand claps and floating synths. The song "Want Me, Want Me" is a reggae-style dance tune with an addictive loop that incorporates Japanese elements like the koto that plays during the intro. Atypical for Amuro, the song contains sexually aggressive lyrics and even name-drops the condom brand Trojan. The song "WoWa" (pronounced "Ooh Wah") is an uptempo R&B and dance-pop number with an arrangement that mixes sounds made by real people, such as marching, hand claps, and flutes. "I Wanna Show You My Love" is a UK-style R&B number that serves as a love letter to Amuro's fans. "Girl Talk" is a dance pop and R&B tune that lyrically revolves around female camaraderie. "Free" is a mid-tempo Southern hip hop tune with a dark intro that develops into a bewitching, rhythmic synth sound. "My Darling" is a soulful Crunk&B number. "Ups & Downs" is a midtempo R&B number; it was originally planned to be sung solo, but after Amuro heard Nao'ymt singing the song exceptionally, Amuro told him, "I would love to sing it with you," and decided to make it a duet.

"I Love You" is a disco pop number with sparkling rhythmic bouncing sounds; the words 'I love you' are said four times during the chorus in four different languages (French, English, Spanish and Chinese). "All for You" is the album's sole ballad. "Alarm" is a pop and R&B song with a heavy bassline. "No" is a club tune with a bouncy sound; the middle eight, with its handclaps and synths, stirs up calls of "N-A-M-I-E." A hidden track known to fans as "No pt.II" is included shortly after "No"; it is a remixed slow-paced version of the song containing new vocals.

== Title and artwork ==
The album cover for Queen of Hip-Pop was photographed by Shoji-Uchida. The CD artwork has Amuro wearing a black sleeveless shirt, black hotpants and thigh high black boots. Her pose depicts her sitting with one hand gently touching her hair, and having a slightly sideways gaze. The background is a dark, glossy, almost liquid-looking black material which is textured and seems to be wrapped around her. Superimposed on the image in a large, bold, light-pink font are the words "Queen of Hip Pop." The booklet and photoshoot were designed by Aratame, while the booklet's illustrations were done by Jiro Fujii.

The album art theme is that of the Pink Panther. Amuro happened to be a big fan of the Pink Panther cartoon character and wanted to include its image. A licensing deal was struck with MGM studios allowing Amuro to freely use the character in her album artwork and promotion. A special character "Namie Panther" based on Amuro herself was also created as a counterpart to the Pink Panther. Because of the Pink Panther deal, all of the material released for the album has been pink. First pressing packaging of the album included Pink Panther stickers and a Pink Panther styled newspaper containing lyrics for the album.

During an interview with Bounce in July 2005, Amuro stated that the usage of the word "Hip-Pop" in the album title was to give the listener an easy-to-understand image of the record; she explained in full detail;

It was the same with "Style," but I wanted the album title to express the image of the work in a single word that would be easy to understand. And "Hip-Pop" may be a vague and half-baked word (laughs), but I thought it was the easiest to understand. I don't think I'm biased toward J-pop this time, nor toward hip-hop or R&B. Well, "Queen" is attached to it (laughs).

== Singles ==
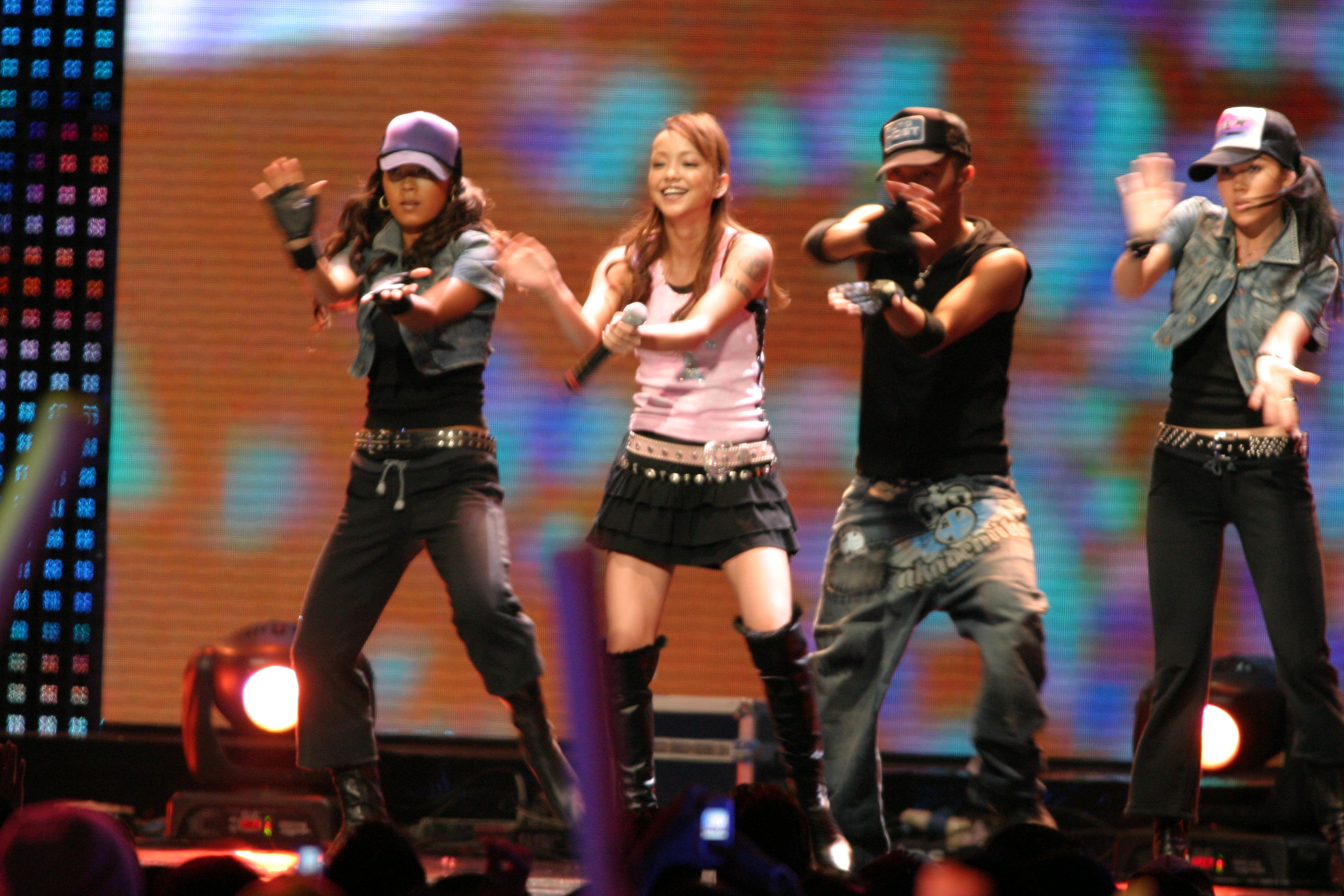
Namie Amuro performing "Girl Talk" at MTV Asia Aid 2005

Four singles were released to promote Queen of Hip-Pop. The first, "Alarm," released in March 2004, is her first (and to date, only) single to miss the top ten by peaking at number eleven on the Oricon Singles Chart. Despite the low sales, "Alarm" became a popular hit in Japan. She performed "Alarm" at the 2004 MTV Video Music Awards Japan held at Tokyo Bay NK Hall on May 23, 2004.

Four months later in July 2004 she released "All for You," her first original ballad since "I Will" in 2002. The single was a great success and became the first of three consecutive singles to sell over 100,000 copies. On July 24, 2004, she performed the song at the MTV Buzz Asia Concert held in Seoul, as a performing artist representing Japan. "All for You" has been certified gold for shipments of over 100,000 by the Recording Industry Association of Japan (RIAJ) and reached number six on the Oricon Singles Chart.

In October 2004, the double A-side single "Girl Talk/The Speed Star" was released. This was her first double A-side single since "So Crazy/Come" in 2003. Interestingly, when the album was released only "Girl Talk" was included in the tracklist while "The Speed Star" was omitted for unknown reasons. The single was a big hit for Amuro, debuting at number two on the Oricon Singles Chart, her first single to achieve this since "Wishing On The Same Star." The success of "Girl Talk/The Speed Star" earned Amuro an invite to perform at the 55th NHK Kohaku Utagassen, but she declined. This ended her nine year streak of performing at Kouhaku Uta Gassen. The following year, on February 3, 2005, she performed "Girl Talk" at MTV Asia Aid 2005, which was held in Bangkok. At the 2005 MTV Video Music Awards Japan held on May 9, 2005, the music video for "Girl Talk" won the prize for Best R&B Video.

The last single off the album, "Want Me, Want Me," was released in April 2005. In March 2005, a month before its official release, Amuro sung the song at Japan's largest fashion event, Kobe Collection. The performance surprised the approximately 2,000 audience members who had not been notified at all of her appearance. Amuro commented: "I was nervous as it was a special fashion show, but I enjoyed it a lot because the audience erupted when I appeared!" The song "Want Me, Want Me" was another hit for her and reached number two on the Oricon Singles Chart. It also provided her with her largest first week sales since "Say the Word." Two months later she performed the song at the 2005 MTV Video Music Awards Japan in front of an audience of 7,500 people, saying: "I hope people who like music will see it as it is, instead of getting worked up about it."

=== Music videos ===
The music video for "Alarm" was directed by Ugichin. The video was predominately filmed in black-and-white and depicts Amuro and her backup dancers dancing in a warehouse wearing biker fashion. There are also interspersed scenes throughout the video of a TV screen in a bar showing Amuro walking down a runway while wearing a yellow minidress. A drag queen called Margaret also makes a brief appearance. At the end of the video, a ring is chucked at the screen and picked up by a long-haired man whose look is reminiscent of Amuro’s ex-husband.

The music video for "All For You" was directed by Masashi Mutō and depicts Amuro singing emotionally all alone on a beach in Tateyama City, Chiba Prefecture in front of a sunset.

The music video for "Girl Talk" was directed by Ugichin. Filmed in a Spanish-style mansion, the video is plain and simple, depicting Amuro in a variety of rooms. The main scene of the video has Amuro in a pink cowboy hat while she's dancing with two female dancers. Another scene has her singing on top of a bed. The third scene had Amuro sitting in a living room with her two dancers chatting on a settee in the background.

The music video for "The Speed Star" was also directed by Ugichin; it features Amuro and five background dancers performing in front of a giant car motor. As they dance, runners try to sprint towards Amuro before being blown back by the fan of the motor. The video switches between this scene and two others. Another scene has Amuro and her dancers performing in pink boxes. The camera spans back and forth between each dancer as they freestyle. The last scene of the video involves Amuro pole dancing alone. This scene was presented in black and white with high contrast between the tones.

The music video for "Want Me Want Me" was directed by Masashi Mutō. Filmed in an undisclosed studio, it features Amuro and several dancers of various ethnic backgrounds dancing vehemently in a flooded room. The room switches between two colors, blue and beige.

Another track off the album, "WoWa," was released as a video and radio single but was not retailed. The music video for "WoWa" was directed by Masashi Mutō. The video featured Amuro on rollerskates dancing with cheerleaders by a pool. Animated scenes of the Pink Panther and Namie Panther were made specifically for the video.

== Promotion ==
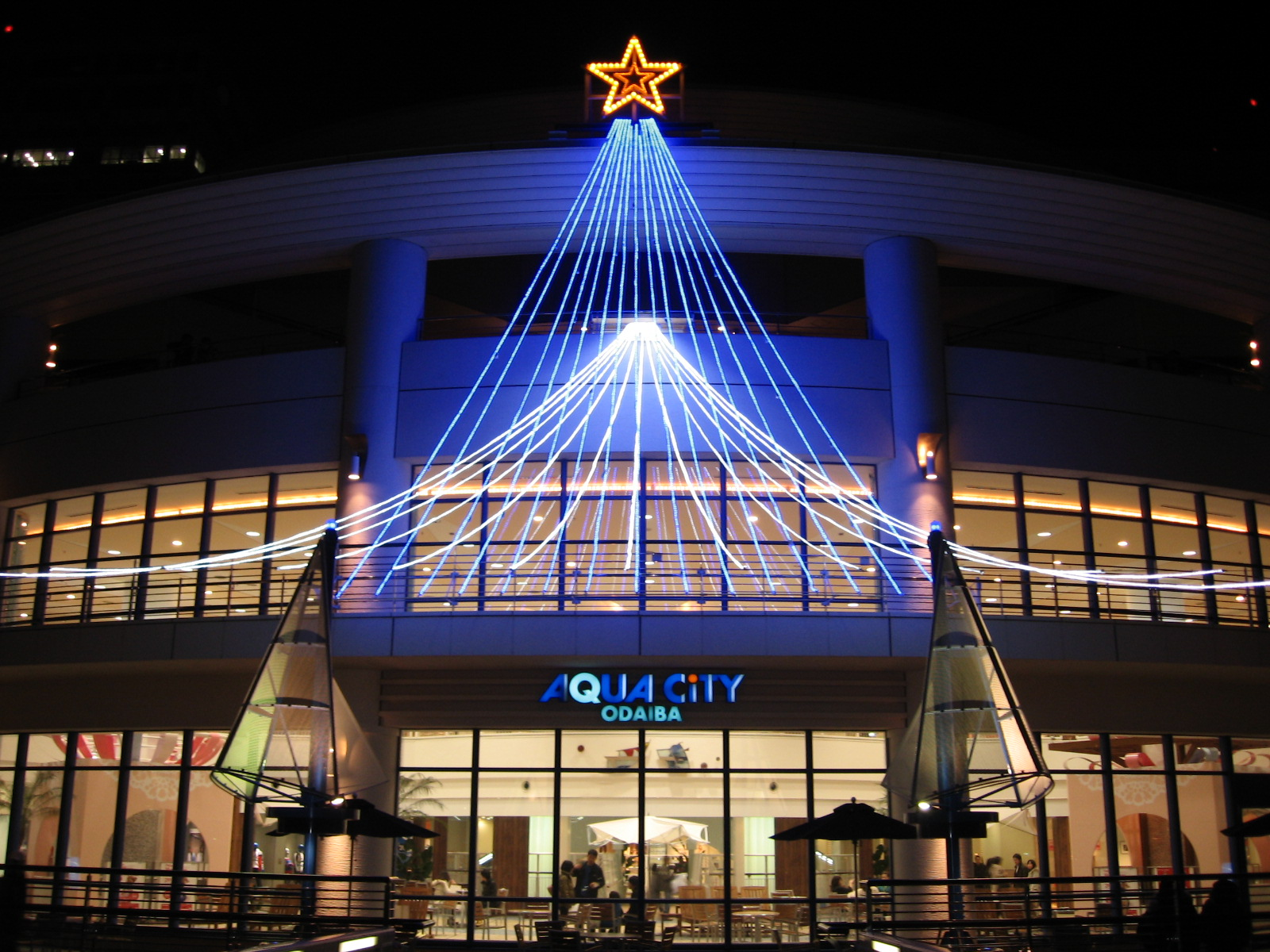
On July 18, 2005, Amuro promoted the album with a secret live concert held on the rooftop of Aqua City Odaiba (pictured)

To promote Queen of Hip-Pop, approximately 150 Namie Panther flags were displayed around Center Gai in Shibuya. Throughout the album's promotional campaign, Amuro promoted several songs off of it through various products and advertisements. Before the album was even announced, its title track was used as a commercial jingle for Chevrolet Suzuki Cruze automobiles. For the songs "Alarm," "Girl Talk" and "WoWa," Amuro appeared in three TV commercials for the Lucido-L hair products which featured each one of those three songs respectively. "All For You" served as the opening theme to the popular dorama Kimi Ga Omoide Ni Naru Mae Ni. This was her first single since 1998's "I Have Never Seen" to be used for a television drama. "No" was later used to promote the "Space of Hip-Pop" home video.

Five days after the release of Queen of Hip-Pop, a secret event titled “HMV 15th Anniversary Presents Namie Amuro "Queen of Hip-Pop"” was held on a special stage on the rooftop of Aqua City Odaiba, where she performed three songs from the album, including "WoWa," in the heat of over 30°C. On July 21, 2005, Amuro participated in the public recording of FM Osaka's Love Flap at the HMV Shinsaibashi Store in Chuo Ward, Osaka; approximately 300 people selected from program listeners and fan club members attended the venue.

=== Space of Hip-Pop ===
Space of Hip-Pop
- Tour by Namie Amuro
- Associated album: Queen of Hip-Pop
- Start date: September 1, 2005
- End date: December 24, 2005
- Legs: 1
- No. of shows: 35

Namie Amuro concert chronology
- So Crazy Tour (2003-2004); Space of Hip-Pop (2005); Live Style 2006 (2006)

To further promote the album, Amuro embarked on the Space of Hip-Pop tour. The tour began on September 1, 2005 at the Ichihara Civic Hall in the Chiba Prefecture, and was originally scheduled to run for 29 shows before concluding at the Sendai Sun Plaza Hall in Miyagi on December 22. Due to high demand, 6 additional shows were added, including the final concert at the Tokyo International Forum on December 24, 2005.

Amuro performed songs from Queen of Hip-Pop and her previous singles, including songs from Style, Genius 2000 and Sweet 19 Blues. Starting with the November 2, 2005 concert in Kobe, Amuro added her new singles, "White Light" and "Violet Sauce", to the show's setlist.

The tour was later released on DVD on March 15, 2006, and was later released in Blu-ray format four years later on December 15, 2010. Both physical formats were re-released on September 16, 2012, as part of Amuro's 20th career anniversary, with the original content but at a lower retail price. Commercially, the DVD release was successful in Japan, peaking at number two on the Oricon DVD Chart. The live performance of "No" from the concert was released as a music video to promote the tour's DVD release. In May 2007, the live release was certified gold by the Recording Industry Association of Japan (RIAJ) for exceeding shipments of 100,000 units.

Space of Hip-Pop tour set list
1. "Queen of Hip-Pop"
2. "Want Me, Want Me"
3. "WoWa"
4. "I Wanna Show You My Love"
5. "Girl Talk"
6. "The Speed Star"
7. "My Darling"
8. "Ups & Downs"
9. "Violet Sauce"
10. "All for You"
11. "Don't Wanna Cry"
12. "Alarm"
13. "Body Feels Exit"
14. "Shine More"
15. "So Crazy"
16. "Love 2000"
17. "You're My Sunshine"
18. "Chase the Chance"
19. "Say the Word"
20. "No"

Encore

21. "Put 'Em Up"
22. "Can You Celebrate?"
23. "White Light"
24. "I Love You"

== Critical reception ==
Professional ratings
Review scores
Source	Rating
Playlouder	4/5 stars
MTVChinese.com	4/5 stars
Hot Express	(favorable)
CD Journal	(neutral)

Queen of Hip-Pop was warmly received by critics. Daniel Robson of Playlouder awarded the album with four starts out of five. In the review he commended Amuro for her adaption to the R&B and hip-hop trend that became popular in Japan at the time. At the end of the review he stated: "Oh, but then there are bouncy beats, apocalyptic dance-me-ups and crazy stop-starts sprinkled all over the record, as well as a few Engrish lyrics to laugh at. And who could ever ask for more?" Yuzu of MTVChinese.com awarded the album four stars out of five, praising Queen of Hip‑Pop as a bold, genre‑blending album that cements Amuro's dominance in both hip‑hop and fashion; the reviewer highlighted her musical evolution, strong production, and star power while enthusiastically recommending nearly every track.

Tetsuo Hiraga of Hot Express was extremely positive on the album, feeling that, in his own words: "the songs are uncompromising and unreserved, and give the impression of the “real thing” that Namie Amuro wanted to make her own. It would be difficult to listen to such a comprehensive collection of songs, but I was truly amazed at the identity of Namie Amuro, who was able to make all of them into popular music and comfortable to listen to." A mini-review from CD Journal pointed out that the vibrant visuals are slightly out of step with the enthusiasm of the project, but claimed that the work is by no means bad.

== Commercial performance ==
In Japan, Queen of Hip-Pop debuted at the runner-up spot on the Oricon Albums Chart with 201,524 units sold in its first week, being blocked from number one by Ketsumeishi's Ketsunopolis 4. This became Amuro's highest first week sales for an album in five years. It descended to number three on the albums chart the following week, shifting 91,236 units. In total, Queen of Hip-Pop lasted four weeks in the top ten, eleven weeks in the top 100, and stayed in the top 300 chart for 25 weeks. Additionally, it was ranked the 27th best-selling album of 2005 with 450,359 copies sold by the end of the year. The record also peaked at number one on the Taiwanese J-Pop chart and number two on the Combo Chart. Queen of Hip-Pop was certified double platinum by the Recording Industry Association of Japan (RIAJ) for shipments of 500,000 units. In the second quarter of 2006, Avex reported that Queen of Hip-Pop sold approximately 494,000 copies in Japan. According to Oricon Style, Queen of Hip-Pop is Amuro's twelfth best-selling album overall.

== Track listing ==
CD
No.	Title	Lyrics	Music	Arranger(s)	Length
1.	"Queen of Hip-Pop"	Tiger	Nao'ymt	Nao'ymt	3:14
2.	"Want Me, Want Me"	Michico	Sugi-V	Sugi-V	3:10
3.	"WoWa"	Nao'ymt	Nao'ymt	Nao'ymt	4:08
4.	"I Wanna Show You My Love"	Michico	T.Kura, Michico	T.Kura	3:39
5.	"Girl Talk"	T.Kura, Michico	T.Kura, Michico	T.Kura	4:22
6.	"Free"	Namie Amuro	Nao’ymt	Nao'ymt	4:18
7.	"My Darling"	Michico	T. Kura, Michico	T.Kura	4:14
8.	"Ups & Downs" (duet with Nao'ymt)	Nao'ymt	Nao'ymt	Nao'ymt	3:46
9.	"I Love You"	Christopher Stewart, Tab, Traci Hale; Japanese lyrics: Shoko Fujibayashi	Christopher Stewart, Tab, Traci Hale		4:16
10.	"All for You"	Natsumi Watanabe	Ryoki Matsumoto	Jun Abe	5:47
11.	"Alarm"	Jusme	Monk	Monk	4:10
12.	"No"	Nao'ymt	Nao'ymt	Nao'ymt	7:07
Total length:					52:28

Secret Track
No.	Title	Lyrics	Music	Arranger(s)	Length
13.	"Yes" (-Secret Track-)	Nao'ymt	Nao'ymt	Nao'ymt	7:07

== Credits and personnel ==
1. Queen of Hip-Pop
  - Produced by Nao'ymt
  - All instruments performed by Nao'ymt
  - Mixed by D.O.I.
2. WANT ME, WANT ME
  - Produced by Sugi-V
  - Co-Produced by Michico
  - Vocal Produced by Michico
  - All instruments performed by Sugi-V
  - Mixed by D.O.I.
3. WoWa
  - Produced by Nao'ymt
  - All instruments performed by Nao'ymt
  - Mixed by D.O.I.
4. I Wanna Show You My Love
  - Produced by T.Kura
  - Vocal Produced by Michico
  - All instruments performed by T.Kura
  - Mixed by T.Kura
5. GIRL TALK
  - Produced by T.Kura
  - Vocal Produced by Michico
  - All instruments performed by T.Kura
  - Mixed by T.Kura
6. Free
  - Produced by Nao'ymt
  - All instruments performed by Nao'ymt
  - Mixed by Yoshiaki Onishi
7. My Darling
  - Produced by T.Kura
  - Vocal Produced by Michico
  - Additional Vocals by L.L.BROTHERS
  - All instruments performed by T.Kura
  - Mixed by T.Kura
8. Ups & Downs duet with Nao'ymt
  - Produced by Nao'ymt
  - All instruments performed by Nao'ymt
  - Mixed by Yoshiaki Onishi
9. I Love You
  - Produced by C."Tricky" Stewart
  - Japanese Lyrics by Shoko Fujibayashi
  - All instruments performed by C."Tricky" Stewart
  - Track Recorded by Brian"B-Luv"Thomas
  - Mixed by Carlton Lynn
10. ALL FOR YOU
  - Arranged by Jun Abe & Ryoki Matsumoto
  - Chorus arranged by Ryoki Matsumoto
  - Programmed by Jun Abe
  - Chorus: Ryoki Matsumoto
  - Piano & Keyboard: Jun Abe
  - Guitar: Kenji Suzuki
  - Strings: Rush by Takashi Katou
  - Mixed by Junya Endo
11. ALARM
  - All instruments performed by MONK
  - Mixed by Yoshiaki Onishi
12. No
  - Produced by Nao'ymt
  - All instruments performed by Nao'ymt
  - Mixed by D.O.I.
- Lead and Background Vocals directed by Nao'ymt(#1,8,12), Michico(#2,4,5,7), Daisuke Imai(#3,6,9), Kenji Sano(#11)
- Recorded by Toshihiro Wako, except #3 (by Yusuke Abe) and #10 (by Toshihiro Wako & Eiji Kameda)
- Mastered by Tom Coyne

== Production ==
- Producers – T.Kura, Michico, Nao'ymt, C. "Tricky" Stewart, Sugi-V
- Vocal Producers – Michico
- Vocal Direction – Daisuke Imai, Michico, Nao'ymt, Kenji Sano
- Chorus Arrangement – Ryoki Matsumoto
- Mixing – D.O.I, Junya Endo, T.Kura, Carlton Lynn, Yoshiaki Onishi
- Photography – Shoji Uchida
- Art Direction – Hidekazu Sato

== Charts ==
=== Weekly charts ===
Chart (2005)	Peak position
Japanese Albums (Oricon)	2
Taiwanese Albums (G-Music)	2
Taiwanese J-pop Albums (G-Music)	1

=== Monthly charts ===
Chart (2005)	Peak position
Japanese Albums (Oricon)	4

=== Year-end charts ===
Chart (2005)	Position
Japanese Albums (Oricon)	27

== Sales and certifications ==
Region	Certification	Certified units/sales
Japan (RIAJ)	2× Platinum	494,000
South Korea	—	3,700
