= Girl Talk (Namie Amuro song) =

- CD version (used to commercialize "Girl Talk")

Single by Namie Amuro

from the album Queen of Hip-Pop
- A-side: "The Speed Star"
- Released: October 14, 2004
- Recorded: 2004
- Studio: Rojam Studio
- Genre: Dance; pop; R&B
- Length: 4:24
- Label: Avex Trax
- Songwriters: T.Kura; Michico
- Producer: T.Kura

Namie Amuro singles chronology
"All for You" (2004)	"Girl Talk" (2004)	"Want Me, Want Me" (2005)

"Girl Talk" is a song by Japanese singer Namie Amuro. Avex Trax released it on digital and physical formats on October 14, 2004, and it is the third single from Amuro's seventh studio album, Queen of Hip-Pop (2005). It was also released as a double A-side with "The Speed Star", though the latter did not appear on the parent album. "Girl Talk" was written and produced by T.Kura and Michico, and is a dance song with R&B and pop influences that, like its parent album, transitions from Amuro's original dance sound to a more mature yet transatlantic sound.

Music critics praised "Girl Talk" for its sound and Amuro's vocal performance, describing the track as cute and smooth. Furthermore, some critics praised it as a highlight in Amuro's discography. Commercially, the double A-side format performed well in Japan, peaking at number two on the Oricon Singles Chart and being certified gold by the Recording Industry Association of Japan (RIAJ) for selling over 100,000 copies. Furthermore, "Girl Talk" was certified gold by the RIAJ after exceeding 100,000 digital downloads in the region.

To promote "Girl Talk," a music video for it was filmed in a Spanish-style mansion. The video won Best R&B Video and was nominated for Video of the Year at the 2005 MTV Video Music Awards Japan. Since its release, the song has appeared on several of Amuro's concert tours and subsequent live releases, as well as her greatest hits album Best Fiction (2008), and was re-recorded for her final compilation album Finally (2017).

== Background and composition ==
"Girl Talk"
"Girl Talk" is a dance and R&B number that draws inspiration from hip-hop. A female empowerment anthem, the song's lyrics contain themes of love.

From 2004 to 2005, Amuro worked on her seventh studio album, Queen of Hip-Pop (2005). Amuro collaborated on the album with Japanese producers and songwriters T.Kura, Michico, and Nao'ymt, as well as Tricky Stewart and Sugi-V. Amuro enlisted Michico to assist her with new music because they had previously collaborated; she was inspired by their work together on her album Style (2003), particularly her song "Namie's Style," and both of them wanted to continue working towards Amuro's transition from dance-oriented music to R&B and hip-hop influences.

T. Kura and Michico wrote and produced "Girl Talk," and T. Kura arranged the entire song's instrumentation. Amuro recorded the song with Toshihiro Wako at Rojam Studio, with T. Kura mixing and Tom Coyne mastering the final version. Musically, it is a dance song with R&B and pop influences that, like its parent album, develops into a more mature but transatlantic sound. Amuro expressed her satisfaction with the song's final completion and acknowledged Michico's contributions to the track. Lyrically, the song is a female empowerment anthem that touches on themes love and being in a relationship with the lyrics featuring words from the female-themed drama Sex and the City and the movie Thelma & Louise; Amuro shared that she hoped other women will relate to it.

== Release ==
Avex Trax released "Girl Talk" as a double A-side single along with "The Speed Star" in Japan on October 15, 2004. Both songs serve as the third single from Queen of Hip-Pop, and were released in digital and physical formats. The CD single and digital formats include both tracks and their instrumental versions, while the DVD versions include the music video for "The Speed Star". Furthermore, the CD and DVD versions have different artwork: the CD version shows Amuro sucking on a lollipop, whereas the DVD format shows Amuro sitting on a motorcycle. Both formats were released in Taiwan one day later, on October 16. Furthermore, Dimension Point made the song available worldwide through digital and streaming services.

== Reception ==
Music critics gave "Girl Talk" positive reviews. AllMusic had previously hailed the song as a standout from Amuro's discography. Daniel Robison of Playlouder praised the song's sound as "straight, smooth R&B". The Japanese magazine CDJournal reviewed the single's standalone release and appearance on Queen of Hip-Pop and Amuro's greatest hits album Best Fiction (2008). The single received praise for its production style and string arrangements, with "Girl Talk" and "The Speed Star" being described as "glossy" and "cool". The magazine described it as a "cute track" that was "fashionable" but "not too sweet" for its appearance on Queen of Hip-Pop, while its inclusion on Best Fiction was praised for its R&B influences and Amuro's vocals.

Commercially, the single was a success in Japan. "Girl Talk/The Speed Star" debuted at number one on the Oricon Daily Singles Chart, and eventually opened at number two on the Weekly Chart, selling 41,717 units in its first week. It remained on the chart for a total of 16 weeks, selling 98,047 units by the end of 2004, with Oricon ranking it as the 97th best-selling single of the year. The Recording Industry Association of Japan (RIAJ) certified the CD single gold for exceeding 100,000 sales in Japan, while "Girl Talk" received a gold certification for exceeding 100,000 digital downloads. "Girl Talk/The Speed Star" ranks as her 29th best-selling single in the country.

== Promotion ==
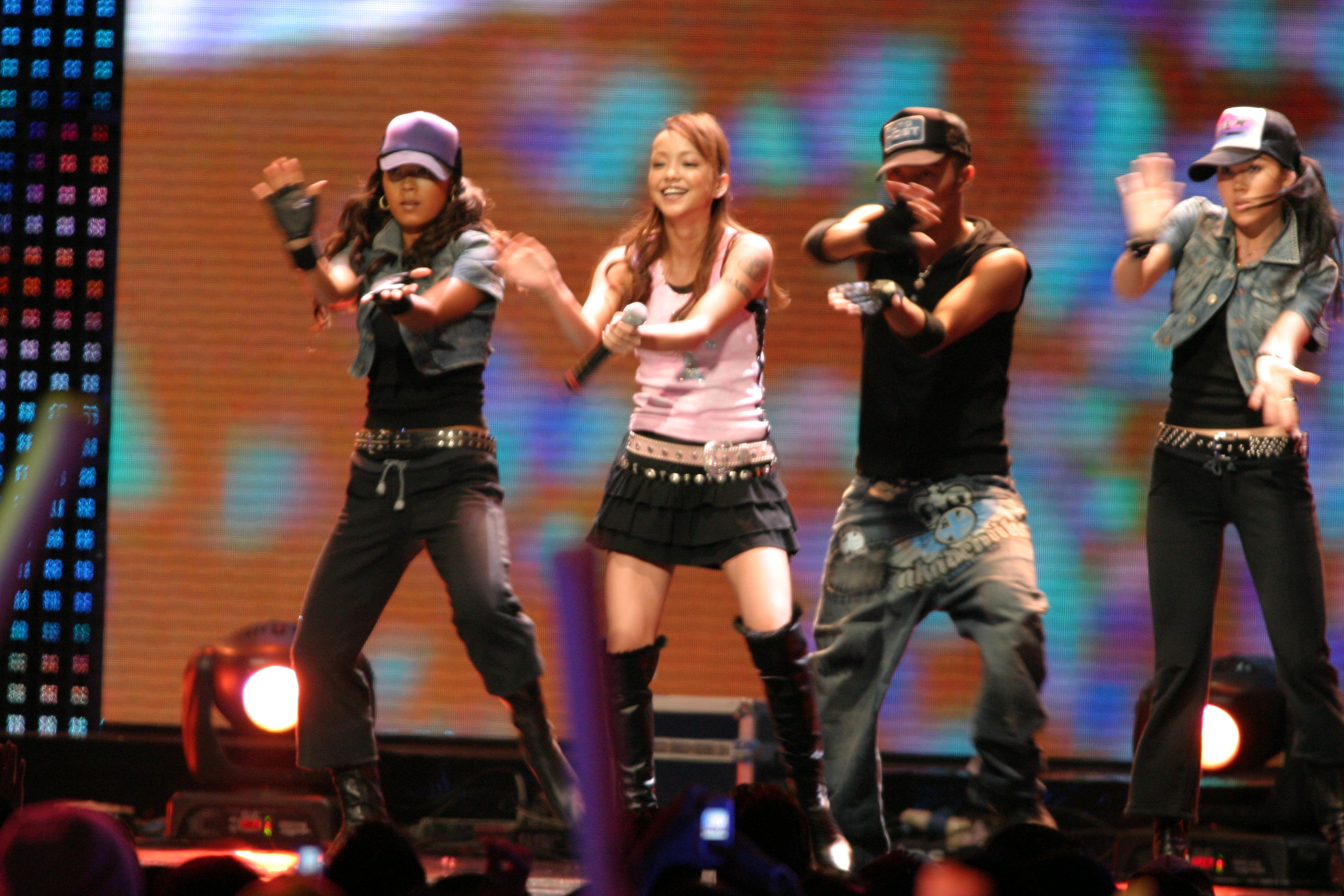
Amuro performing "Girl Talk" during MTV Asia Aid in Bangkok in February 2005.

Ugichin directed the music video for "Girl Talk," which features four major shots of Amuro in a large Spanish-style mansion: Amuro dancing in a room with two backup dancers, Amuro singing the song in front of a grey wall, Amuro sitting in a living room, and Amuro sitting on a bed. According to Amuro, she chose not to wear formal clothes and wanted the overall vibe to be "girly" in order to imitate the song's energy, so she dressed casually for the video. It was included on the DVD version of Best Fiction and her video album Filmography 2001-2005 (2005). The video won Best R&B Video and nominated for Video of the Year at the 2005 MTV Video Music Awards Japan.

Both "Girl Talk" and "The Speed Star" were used as commercial songs for the cosmetics company Lucido-L, for which Amuro had been the spokesperson for since 2003. Amuro was invited to promote "Girl Talk" and "The Speed Star" at Kōhaku Uta Gassen, but declined. This ended her nine-year streak of performing at the vital event. The following year, on February 3, 2005, she performed as Japan's representative performing artist at MTV Asia Aid, held in Bangkok, Thailand, for the purpose of supporting the reconstruction from the 2004 Indian Ocean earthquake and tsunami. Thirteen years after its release, Amuro re-recorded "Girl Talk" for her final greatest hits album, Finally (2017). Since its release, "Girl Talk" has appeared on six of Amuro's concert tours and subsequent live releases, including her final tour in 2018 to celebrate her retirement.

== Formats and track listing ==
CD / digital / streaming formats

1. "Girl Talk" – 4:24
2. "The Speed Star" – 4:19
3. "Girl Talk" (Instrumental) – 4:24
4. "The Speed Star" (Instrumental) – 4:19

Bonus DVD

1. "The Speed Star" (Music video)

== Credits and personnel ==
Credits adapted from the liner notes of Queen of Hip-Pop.

Locations

- Recorded at Giant Swing Studios and Studio Greenbird, Tokyo, Japan.

Personnel

- Namie Amuro – vocals, background vocals
- Michico – songwriter, background vocals, producer, vocal producer
- T.Kura – songwriter, composer, producer, instruments, audio mixer
- Monk – instruments
- Akira – vocal producer
- Toshihiro Wako - recording assistant
- Tom Coyne - audio master

== Charts ==
=== Weekly charts ===
Chart (2004–2005)	Peak position
Japan Singles (Oricon)	2

=== Monthly charts ===
Chart (2004)	Peak position
Japan Singles (Oricon)	14

=== Year-end charts ===
Chart (2004)	Position
Japan Singles (Oricon)	97

Chart (2005)	Position
Taiwan (Yearly Singles Top 100)	25

== Certification ==
Region	Certification	Certified units/sales
Japan (RIAJ) CD version.	Gold	100,000^{^}
Japan (RIAJ) Girl Talk (digital)	Gold	100,000^{*}
^{*} Sales figures based on certification alone.^{^} Shipments figures based on certification alone.

== Release history ==
"Girl Talk"/"The Speed Star" release history
Region	Date	Format	Label	Ref(s).
Japan	October 15, 2004	CD single; DVD; digital download	Avex Trax	
Hong Kong	October 16, 2004	CD single; DVD	Avex Trax	
Various	N/A	Digital download; streaming	Avex Trax; Dimension Point	
