= Alarm (Namie Amuro song) =

Single by Namie Amuro

from the album Queen of Hip-Pop
- B-side: "Strobe"
- Released: March 17, 2004
- Recorded: 2004
- Studio: Rojam Studio
- Length: 4:16
- Label: Avex Trax
- Songwriters: Jusme; Monk

Namie Amuro singles chronology
"So Crazy/Come" (2003)	"Alarm" (2004)	"All for You" (2004)

"Alarm" (stylized in all caps) is a song by Japanese recording artist Namie Amuro. It was released by Avex Trax on March 17, 2004, serving as the lead single to Amuro's seventh studio album Queen of Hip-Pop (2005). The song was written by Jusme and composed by Monk. The B-side "Strobe" was first planned as the main track of this single and when Amuro got the demo for "Alarm" the song was titled "Clock."

Musically, "Alarm" is a pop and R&B song with a heavy bassline and takes influences from the crunk music sound that was prevalent on the American music charts during the mid-2000s. The final product was recorded at Rojam Studio. "Alarm" was generally well-received by music critics, praising its melody and its production.

Commercially, the song was a disappointment in Japan. It became Amuro's first solo single, and only to date, to appear out of the top ten on the Oricon Singles Chart by peaking at only number eleven. The single was re-released on November 14, 2017 to try to enhance its original position, and to reach the top ten. The purchase campaign was both supported by music stores and "Alarm"'s songwriter, Monk. Since its release, "Alarm" has appeared on several of Amuro's concert tours, as well as her greatest hits album Best Fiction (2008).

== Background and composition ==
"Alarm"
"Aalrm" is an upbeat pop and Crunk&B number.

After completing her So Crazy Tour tour, which was her first international tour, Amuro began work on her seventh studio album, Queen of Hip-Pop. Amuro collaborated on the album with Japanese producers and songwriters T.Kura, Michico, and Nao'ymt, as well as Tricky Stewart and Sugi-V. Amuro enlisted Michico to assist her with new music because they had previously collaborated; she was inspired by their work together on her album Style (2003), particularly her song "Namie's Style," and both of them wanted to continue working towards Amuro's transition from dance-oriented music to R&B and hip-hop influences.

Both "Alarm" and the B-side "Strobe" was written by Jusme, while their music was composed and arrange by Monk. Amuro recorded the song with Toshihiro Wako at Rojam Studio, with Yoshiaki Onishi mixing at Studio Somewhere. The final project was mastered by Tom Coyne at Sterling Sound. Musically, the song is an upbeat pop and R&B song that features a heavy bassline. In an interview, Amuro stated that the singles she had released before “Alarm” were all rather R&B-oriented songs, so she was looking for a song with a slightly different nuance, an up-tempo song, and that's when she came across “Alarm." She believed it was a song that she could sing live and vent in various ways. The B-side, "Strobe," is an R&B song featuring dynamic drums and intertwining bubble sounds at the beginning of the song.

== Release and promotion ==
Still from the music video for "Alarm," which was predominately filmed in black and white

Avex Trax released "Alarm" in Japan on March 17, 2004, in digital and physical formats. It serves as the lead single from Amuro's seventh studio album Queen of Hip-Pop (2005). The CD single and digital format include the title track and the B-side track "Strobe." The song served as a commercial song for Mandom's “LUCIDO-L Prism Magic Hair Color” commercials.

The music video for "Alarm" was directed by Ugichin. The video was predominately filmed in black-and-white and depicts Amuro and her backup dancers dancing in a warehouse wearing biker fashion. There are also interspersed scenes throughout the video of a TV screen in a bar showing Amuro walking down a runway while wearing a yellow minidress. A drag queen named Margaret also makes a brief appearance. At the end of the video, a ring is chucked at the screen and picked up by a long-haired man whose look is reminiscent of Amuro’s ex-husband. The video was included on the DVD version of Best Fiction and her video album Filmography 2001-2005 (2005). On May 23, 2004, she performed “Alarm” as a performing artist at the MTV Video Music Awards Japan 2004 held at the Tokyo Bay NK Hall.

== Reception ==
Music critics gave "Alarm" positive reviews. Eri Kato of Hot Express was extremely positive on the single, feeling that it is "another single where you can fully enjoy her charm. You can feel her vision of the world in your mind. The powerful tracks and the layered vocals give you goosebumps! They are thrilling, but they do not overpower each other, and neither one stands out too much, and they assert themselves in just the right balance." Japanese magazine CDJournal reviewed the single and its appearances on Queen of Hip-Pop and Best Fiction. CDJournal praised the track for being simple, with as few notes as possible, and the sharpness of the music is being enhanced, bringing her vocals to the fore. Its appearance on Queen of Hip-Pop was praised for the matte and sexy singing voice combined with the heavy bass that makes the listener's heart pound with excitement. For Best Fiction, the song was praised for its cool, solid bass and a stoic development that doesn't miss a beat.

Commercially, "Alarm" underperformed in Japan upon release. It debuted at number eleven on the Oricon Singles Chart, selling 21,049 units in its first week. It dropped to number fifteen the next week, selling 8,403 copies. The single stayed in the top twenty one last week, ranking at number eighteen and selling 6,308 copies. "Alarm" sold 50,262 copies by the end of 2004, making it the 196th best-selling single of the year. It remained on the charts for fifteen weeks in total, selling 57,998 units by September 2018. "Alarm" is the only solo single by Amuro that did not chart on the Oricon Weekly top ten. As a consequence, when she announced her retirement in September 2017, Tower Records decided to launch a special campaign to push "Alarm" to the weekly top ten, so Amuro could achieve a new record. Unfortunately, the single only reached number fourteen with 6,808 copies sold.

== Track listing ==
1. "Alarm" (Jusme, Monk) – 4:16
2. "Strobe" (Jusme, Monk) – 4:41
3. "Alarm (Instrumental)" (Monk) – 4:16
4. "Strobe (Instrumental)" (Monk) – 4:37

== Personnel ==
- Namie Amuro – vocals

== TV performances ==
- March 18, 2004 – AX Music Factory
- April 2, 2004 – Pop Jam
- April 3, 2004 – CDTV
- April 5, 2004 – Hey! Hey! Hey!
- April 9, 2004 – Music Station
- May 23, 2004 – MTV Video Awards Japan 2004

== Charts ==
=== Weekly charts ===
Chart (2004)	Peak position
Japan Singles (Oricon)	11

=== Year-end charts ===
Chart (2004)	Position
Japan Singles (Oricon)	196

== Sales ==
Region	Certification	Certified units/sales
Japan	—	57,998
