= Want Me, Want Me =

- CD only cover

Single by Namie Amuro

from the album Queen of Hip-Pop
- B-side: "Handle Me"
- Released: April 6, 2005
- Studio: Baybridge Studio
- Genre: Reggae; dance
- Length: 3:13
- Label: Avex Trax
- Songwriter(s): Michico, Sugi-V
- Producer(s): Sugi-V, Michico

Namie Amuro singles chronology
"Girl Talk/The Speed Star" (2004)	"Want Me, Want Me" (2005)	"White Light/Violet Sauce" (2005)

Alternative cover
- CD+DVD

"Want Me, Want Me" is a song by Japanese recording artist Namie Amuro. It was released by Avex Trax on April 6, 2005, and was the last single from her seventh studio album, Queen of Hip-Pop (2005). "Want Me, Want Me" was initially supposed to be released as an album track of Queen of Hip-Pop or a coupling song, but Amuro thought it was so good she made it a single despite the opposition of her staff. The song's lyrics were written by Michico, while its music was composed by Sugi-V. Musically, "Want Me, Want Me" is an upbeat reggae-style tune with influences of reggaeton and bhangra music. Lyrically, the song is a provocative song that explores themes of desire, sexual agency, and the pursuit of pleasure.

Music critics praised "Want Me, Want Me" for its sound, which was unorthodox in mainstream Japanese music at the time, with some hailing the song as one of the highlights from her discography. Commercially, it was a success in Japan, peaking at the second position on the Oricon Singles Chart. The song was the third of three consecutive singles to sell over 100,000 copies and was certified gold by the Recording Industry Association of Japan (RIAJ) for sales exceeding 100,000 units. "Want Me, Want Me" also provided Amuro with her largest first-week sales in four years.

A music video directed by Masashi Muto was filmed in an undisclosed studio to promote "Want Me, Want Me." Since its release, "Want Me, Want Me" has appeared on several of Amuro's concert tours and subsequent live releases, as well as her greatest hits album Best Fiction (2008), and was re-recorded for her final compilation album Finally (2017).

== Background and composition ==
"Want Me, Want Me"
A sample of "Want Me, Want Me," which is a reggae-influenced number with sexually explicit lyrics.

After completing her So Crazy Tour tour, which was her first international tour, Amuro began work on her seventh studio album, Queen of Hip-Pop. Amuro collaborated on the album with Japanese producers and songwriters T.Kura, Michico, and Nao'ymt, as well as Tricky Stewart and Sugi-V. Amuro enlisted Michico to assist her with new music because they had previously collaborated; she was inspired by their work together on her album Style (2003), particularly her song "Namie's Style," and both of them wanted to continue working towards Amuro's transition from dance-oriented music to R&B and hip-hop influences.

Michico was chosen to write the lyrics for "Want Me, Want Me" and Sugi-V, a hip-hop/reggae beatmaker, was selected as the song's producer and composer. Amuro recorded "Want Me, Want Me" with Toshihiro Wako at Baybridge Studio, with D.O.I. mixing at Daimonion Recordings. The final project was mastered by Tom Coyne at Sterling Sound. "Want Me, Want Me" is best described as a fusion of bhangra and reggaeton music. Its arrangement and composition is most similar to reggaeton music, but it utilizes a sitar sample. The song's accompanying lyrics are explicitly sexual, with the chorus namechecking Trojan condoms.

Amuro explained in an interview that when she first heard the track alone, and just from the track alone she thought, “What's this?" She felt a sense of excitement and thrill that was very different from anything she had ever felt before. Amuro didn't want to ruin the image or coolness of the song, so she asked Michico to write the lyrics and melody. There were other candidates for a single, but Amuro decided to give "Want Me, Want Me" a wide release.

The single's B-side song "Handle Me" was written and composed Akira, while its music was arranged by Junya Endo. "Handle Me" is an upbeat song that features an exotic opening and lyrically describes a person who believes in the future and lives strongly.

== Release and promotion ==
The official video, depicting Amuro in a flooded room dancing with many background dancers.

Avex Trax released "Want Me, Want Me" in Japan on April 9, 2005, in digital formats, as well in a CD only or in a CD+DVD format. It serves as the final single from Amuro's seventh studio album Queen of Hip-Pop (2005). The CD single and digital format include the title track and the B-side track "Handle Me."

The video for "Want Me, Want Me" was shot in an undisclosed studio by director Masashi Muto. It involves Amuro and several dancers performing in a flooded room. The room changes between two colors, blue and beige. Extras of various ethnic backgrounds were used as background dancers throughout the video. It was included on the DVD version of Best Fiction and her video album Filmography 2001-2005 (2005). In March 2005, a month before its official release, Amuro sung "Want Me, Want Me" at Japan's largest fashion event, Kobe Collection. The performance surprised the approximately 2,000 audience members who had not been notified at all of her appearance. Amuro commented: "I was nervous as it was a special fashion show, but I enjoyed it a lot because the audience erupted when I appeared!" On May 29, 2005, she performed “Want Me, Want Me” as a performing artist at the 2005 MTV Video Music Awards Japan held at Tokyo Bay NK Hall. She won two awards that night: “Best R&B Video (award-winning work: GIRL TALK)” and “Most Impressive Performing Asian Artist.”

== Reception ==
Music critics gave "Want Me, Want Me" rave reviews. AllMusic cited the song as a standout from Amuro's discography. Japanese magazine CDJournal reviewed the single and its appearances on Queen of Hip-Pop and Best Fiction. CDJournal praised the single as impressive with its refrain of melodies reminiscent of Okinawan and Middle Eastern folk music. Its appearance on Queen of Hip-Pop was praised for being perfect for listening to on a summer night. For Best Fiction, the song was lauded as a wonderful lovemaking song with a fusion of inorganic beats and sensual ethnic sounds. Daniel Robison of Playlouder praised the song as "unabashed filth that fits perfectly with the grinding bass and stabbing beats." Tetsuo Hiraga of Hot Express praised the song, stating: "I can't believe that Japanese people can't handle authentic R&B; and hip-hop. Because it feels so good!" He also praised the song for completely breaking away from the framework of J-Pop.

Commercially, "Want Me, Want Me" was a success in Japan. The single debuted at number two on the weekly Oricon Singles Chart, selling 48,106 copies in its first week. This marked the largest sales figure for an Amuro single since 2001 with "Say the Word." It dropped to number nine the next week, selling 19,394 copies. The single stayed in the top twenty one last week, ranking at number fourteen and selling 12,278 copies. With sales of 102,733 copies by the end of the fiscal year, "Want Me, Want Me" ranked at number 100 on the year-end Oricon Singles Chart for 2005. The single charted in the top 100 for ten weeks and was eventually certified gold by the Recording Industry Association of Japan (RIAJ) in May 2005 for selling over 100,000 copies.

== Track listing ==
CD only format

CD
No.	Title	Lyrics	Music	Arranger(s)	Length
1.	"Want Me, Want Me"	Michico	Sugi-V		3:13
2.	"Handle Me"	Akira	Akira	Junya Endo	3:30
3.	"Want Me, Want Me" (Instrumental)	Michico	Sugi-V		3:13
4.	"Handle Me" (Instrumental)	Akira	Akira	Junya Endo	3:27
Total length:					13:25

CD and DVD

Disc1: CD
No.	Title	Lyrics	Music	Length
1.	"Want Me, Want Me"	Michico	Sugi-V	3:13
2.	"Want Me, Want Me" (Instrumental)	Michico	Sugi-V	3:13

Disc2: DVD
No.	Title	Length
1.	"Want Me, Want Me" (Music video)	3:20
Total length:		9:40

== Personnel ==
- Namie Amuro – vocals, background vocals
- Michico – background vocals
- Sugi-V – all instruments

== Production ==
- Producers – Sugi-V, Michico
- Vocal Production – Michico
- Mixing – D.O.I
- Music Video Director – Masashi Muto
- Hair & Make Up – Akemi Nakano
- Stylist – Noriko Goto
- Photography – Shoji Uchida
- Design: Aratame

== TV performances ==
- March 24, 2005 – Kobe Collection '05
- April 2, 2005 – CDTV
- April 9, 2005 – Music Fighter
- April 14, 2005 – Utaban
- April 22, 2005 – Music Station
- June 4, 2005 – MTV Video Awards Japan 2005

== Cover versions ==
- Shaan & Sunidhi Chauhan recorded an Indian version for the Bollywood film, Darling, titled 'Aa Khushi Se Khud Khushi Kar Le'. A remix of the song was also released.
- Rica Peralejo, a Filipino singer covered the song titled 'Gumalaw Na' in the album, Bollywood Fever (2006).
- Mina recorded a Korean version, titled 'Istanbul'.
- The sitar sample from the song was also featured in the background music to the cycle 8 premiere episode of America's Next Top Model.

== Charts ==
=== Weekly charts ===
Chart (2005)	Peak position
Japan Singles (Oricon)	2

=== Monthly charts ===
Chart (2005)	Peak position
Japan Singles (Oricon)	7

=== Year-end charts ===
Chart (2005)	Position
Japan Singles (Oricon)	100

== RIAJ certification ==
Region	Certification	Certified units/sales
Japan (RIAJ)	Gold	102,733
