= Shine More =

Single by Namie Amuro

from the album Style
- B-side: "Drive"
- Released: March 5, 2003
- Recorded: Baybridge Studio
- Length: 3:40
- Label: Avex Trax
- Songwriters: Paul Taylor, Scott Nickoley, Sandra Pires, H.U.B

Namie Amuro singles chronology
"Wishing on the Same Star" (2002)	"Shine More" (2003)	"Put 'Em Up" (2003)

"Shine More" (styled in lowercase letters) is a song by Japanese recording artist Namie Amuro. It was released on March 5, 2003, by Avex Trax and serves as the second single from her sixth studio album Style (2003). "Shine More" was originally written by Scott Nickoley, Sandra Pires and Paul Taylor, while the lyrics were translated into Japanese by H.U.B. Amuro called the song the first part of a dance number trilogy including "Put 'Em Up" and "So Crazy."

Musically, "Shine More" is an up-tempo R&B and dance-pop song with thick vocal work and rushing, minor-key strings. Its lyrics describe the protagonist still loving someone after a breakup, but deciding not to chase after them. The song was recorded in the now-defunct Baybridge Studio, which was located in Shibaura, Tokyo. "Shine More" was warmly received by music critics for its production value, with some lauding it as a highlight from her discography.

Commercially, "Shine More" performed moderately in Japan, peaking at number eight on the Oricon Singles Chart. The single was certified gold by the Recording Industry Association of Japan (RIAJ) for shipping over 100,000 units nationwide. The track was additionally used as the Mandom Lucido-L Prism Magic Hair Colour commercial song. Since its release, the song has appeared on several of Amuro's concert tours, as well as her greatest hits album Best Fiction (2008).

== Background and composition ==
Following her stint as a member of the collaborative project Suite Chic, she switched to R&B/hip-hop for the album Style. She commented on the songs, "I released an album in which I did everything I wanted to do in Suite Chic, and I was able to release this album in the good vein of that." Incidentally, one week before the release of "Shine More," she released the original album When Pop Hits the Fan under the Suite Chic umbrella. Amuro called "Shine More" the first part of a dance number trilogy including "Put 'Em Up" and "So Crazy."

The original demo of "Shine More" was recorded in English by Sandra Pires under the title "Catching Up On You." "Shine More" was written by Scott Nickoley, Sandra Pires and Paul Taylor, while H.U.B. translated the lyrics into Japanese. It was recorded at the now-defunct Baybridge Studio in Shibaura, Tokyo, mixed by David Z., and mastered by Yasuji Yasuman Maeda. Musically, "Shine More" is an up-tempo R&B and dance-pop song with thick vocal work and rushing, minor-key strings. It lyrically describes the protagonist still loving her estranged lover after a breakup, but deciding not to chase after them.

== Release and promotion ==
Still from the music video showing Amuro on a white painted Japanese-style stage set with additional backup dancers.

Avex Trax released "Shine More" in Japan on March 5, 2003, in digital and physical formats. It serves as the second single from Amuro's sixth studio album Style (2003). The CD single and digital format include the titular track along with the B-side "Drive," which is the fourth consecutive song written by Amuro herself, following the previous B-side song "Did U." When news of the new single was first announced, it was titled "Ride It". The title was changed to "Drive" and it was included as a B-side.

Ugichin directed the video for "Shine More." The shooting for the music video for "Shine More" took place in mid-February 2003 at a studio in the suburbs of Tokyo. The music video portrays Amuro and her backup dancers dancing on a Japanese-style stage set that is painted white. The song and video were included in Best Fiction, with the video appearing on her video album Filmography 2001-2005 (2005). Since its release, "Shine More" has appeared on four of Amuro's concert tours and subsequent live releases: So Crazy Best Singles, Space of Hip-Pop, Live Style 2006, and Best Fiction. To promote the song, “Shine More” was used in a television advertisement for Mandom's "Lucido-L Prism Magic Hair Color" in which she appears.

== Reception ==
Music critics gave "Shine More" positive reviews. AllMusic recognized it as one of Amuro's best songs. Japanese magazine CDJournal reviewed the single, as well as its appearances on Style and Amuro's greatest hits album Best Fiction (2008). CDJournal positively stated that Amuro's vocals have become more relaxed and have become more lustrous. Furthermore, its appearance on Style was praised for is combination of dark sensations and cool pop. In their Best Fiction review, the magazine stated that the song had "medium R&B with a European flavor" and praised Paul Tyler's and the rest of the overseas production team's contributions to the song.

Commercially, "Shine More" underperformed in Japan. It debuted at number eight on the Oricon Singles Chart, selling 27,938 copies in its first week. It dropped to number eighteen on its second week, logging sales of 11,020 copies, before dropping out of the top twenty entirely the following week. It remained on the charts for nine weeks in total, selling 52,268 copies by September 2018. Despite being viewed as a commercial disappointment, "Shine More" was still certified gold by the Recording Industry Association of Japan (RIAJ).

== Track listing ==
1. "Shine More" (Paul Taylor, Scott Nickoley, Sandra Pires, H.U.B) – 3:40
2. "Drive" (Cherokee, Brion James, Anthony Nance, Namie Amuro) – 4:24
3. "Shine More (Instrumental)" (Paul Taylor, Scott Nickoley, Sandra Pires) – 3:40
4. "Drive (Instrumental)" (Cherokee, Brion James, Anthony Nance) – 4:21

=== Digital download ===
1. "Shine More" (Paul Taylor, Scott Nickoley, Sandra Pires, H.U.B) – 3:40
2. "Drive" (Cherokee, Brion James, Anthony Nance, Namie Amuro) – 4:24

== Personnel ==
- Namie Amuro – vocals, background vocals

== Production ==
- Mixing – David Z.
- Mixing assistant – Sang Park
- Instrument programming – David L. Huff, Cobra Endo
- Vocal direction – Mayumi Harada
- Music video director – Ugichin
- Choreographer – Warner

== TV performances ==
- March 1, 2003 – PopJam
- March 1, 2003 – CDTV
- March 6, 2003 – AX Music Factory
- March 7, 2003 – Music Station
- March 10, 2003 – Hey! Hey! Hey! Music Champ
- April 2, 2003 – CDTV Special
- January 1, 2004 – CDTV Special Live 2003-2004

== Charts ==
Chart (2003)	Peak position
Japan Singles (Oricon)	8

== RIAJ certification ==
Region	Certification	Certified units/sales
Japan (RIAJ)	Gold	52,268
