= So Crazy =

Single by Namie Amuro

from the album Style
- A-side: "Come"
- Released: October 16, 2003
- Recorded: 2002–2003
- Studio: On Air Azabu Studios (Tokyo)
- Genre: R&B
- Length: 4:34
- Label: Avex Trax
- Songwriter(s): Full Force; Jennifer "JJ" Johnson; Michico; Tiger
- Producer(s): Cobra Endo

Namie Amuro singles chronology
"Put 'Em Up" (2003)	"So Crazy" (2003)	"Alarm" (2004)

"So Crazy" is a song by Japanese singer Namie Amuro. It was released on October 16, 2003, by Avex Trax, and serves as the fourth and final single from her sixth studio album, Style (2003). Furthermore, all physical and digital formats included an additional A-side titled "Come," which appears on the parent album. "So Crazy" was written by Full Force, Jennifer "JJ" Johnson, Michico, and Tiger, and produced by Cobra Endo.

"So Crazy" is a love song that incorporates elements of hip-hop and R&B music. Music critics praised "So Crazy" for its urban sound, drawing parallels with Western music and influences. To promote the song, Japanese cosmetics company Lucido-L used it as their commercial theme. However, the single performed moderately in Japan, reaching number eight on the Oricon Singles Chart, making it one of her lowest charting singles in the country.

Masashi Mutō directed the music video for the single, which appeared on her video albums Filmography 2001–2005 (2005). It was also included in the set lists of three Amuro concerts and subsequent live albums. "So Crazy" first appeared on Amuro's third greatest hits album, Best Fiction (2008), and was later reworked and re-recorded for her seventh greatest hits and final album, Finally (2017), before her retirement.

== Background and composition ==
"So Crazy"
A sample of "So Crazy", a hip-hop and R&B number that contains heavy influences from urban music

From 2002 to 2003, Amuro worked on new music with the Japanese project Suite Chic. Her work with them inspired her to invite more collaborators to showcase various aspects of herself through her music. She began working on new music, collaborating with artists such as Zeebra, Ai, and Verbal, among others. During the process, "So Crazy" was one of several demo recordings recommended to her and her team. Amuro said she enjoyed the demo and imagined herself performing the song, saying "I got an image of how it would be right away. I could imagine myself on stage, made up and in costume, singing and dancing to it."

"So Crazy" was written by Full Force and Jennifer "JJ" Johnson, with Japanese lyrics by Michico and a rap section written by Tiger. Amuro stated that she wanted to rap on the song, which Zeebra and Tiger encouraged her to do, with the latter suggesting she showcase her "naughty" side. Toshihiro Wako assisted with the recording at Tokyo's On Air Azabu Studios. Rob Chiarelli and Chandler Bridges mixed the final version, and Yasuji Maeda mastered it. "So Crazy" is a love song that incorporates elements of hip-hop and R&B music.

== Release and promotion ==
On October 13, 2003, Avex Trax released "So Crazy" as a double A-side with "Come" as the third single from Amuro's sixth studio album Style (2003). The CD format included three additional tracks, including instrumental versions of the singles. The single was eventually distributed in Hong Kong in November of that year. The song was used as the commercial theme for the Japanese cosmetics company Lucido-L.

Masashi Mutō directed a music video featuring Amuro and dancers in an underground parking scene, choreographed by Warner. (Note: Video description taken from footage on both Filmography 2001–2005.) The choreography took about ten days to complete, while the music video was finished in one session. The video was later featured on her video album Filmography 2001–2005 (2005). The music video solely revolves around Amuro and her background dancers dancing in an empty, dimly lit parking lot. "So Crazy" was later included on Amuro's setlists for three different tours: the So Crazy Tour, the Space of Hip-Pop Tour, and the Best Fiction Tour. "So Crazy" and its music video appeared on Amuro's third greatest hits album, Best Fiction (2008), while the song was reworked and re-recorded for her seventh greatest hits and final album, Finally (2017), prior to her retirement.

== Reception ==
Music critics gave "So Crazy" positive reviews. AllMusic cited the song as a standout from Amuro's discography. Japanese magazine CDJournal reviewed the single and its appearances on Style and Best Fiction. CDJournal praised the single's release for attempting to capture Western music influences, while its appearance on Style was praised for its hip-hop sound and Michico's contributions to the song. For Best Fiction, the song was praised for its lyrics, alongside its chorus and rap section.

Commercially, it performed moderately in Japan. "So Crazy" and "Come" debuted at number eight on the Oricon Singles Chart, selling 18,868 units in its first week. It became Amuro's lowest performing single at the time, alongside "Shine More", until it was surpassed by the follow-up single "Alarm", which peaked at number 11. The single spent 13 weeks on the chart, and has sold 48,969 units since its release, one of Amuro's poorest performance in the region.

== Formats and track listing ==
CD / digital / streaming formats

1. "So Crazy" – 4:33
2. "Come" – 4:35
3. "So Crazy" (Instrumental) – 4:33
4. "Come" (Instrumental) – 4:35

== Credits and personnel ==
Credits adapted from the liner notes of Style.

Locations

- Recorded at On Air Azabu Studios in Tokyo.

Personnel

- Namie Amuro – vocals
- Cobra Endo – arranger, producer, programmer, production manager, coordinator
- Michico – songwriter
- Tiger – songwriter
- Rob Chiarelli – audio mixer
- Chandler Bridges – audio mixing assistant
- Full Force – composer, songwriter
- Jennifer "JJ" Johnson – composer, songwriter
- Ron Harris – programmer
- Daisuke Imai – vocal director
- Yasuji Maeda – audio master
- Toshihiro Wako – recording assistant

== Weekly charts ==
Chart (2003)	Peak position
Japan (Oricon)	8

== Sales ==
Region	Certification	Certified units/sales
Japan	—	48,969

== Release history ==
"So Crazy"/"Come" release history
Region	Date	Format	Label	Ref(s).
Japan	October 16, 2003	CD single	Avex Trax	
Hong Kong	November 2003	CD single	Avex Trax	
Various	N/A	Digital download; streaming	Avex Trax	
