= Put 'Em Up =

Single by Namie Amuro

from the album Style
- B-side: "Exist for You"
- Released: July 16, 2003
- Recorded: 2003
- Studio: Baybridge Studio (Tokyo)
- Genre: Hip-hop; R&B
- Length: 4:03
- Label: Avex Trax
- Songwriter(s): Dallas Austin; Jasper Cameron; Michico
- Producer(s): Austin

Namie Amuro singles chronology
"Shine More" (2003)	"Put 'Em Up" (2003)	"So Crazy/Come" (2003)

"Put ‘Em Up" is the 24th single by Japanese singer Namie Amuro. It was released on digital and physical formats by Avex Trax on July 16, 2003, and serves as Amuro's third single from her sixth studio album Style (2003). It was originally written by Jasper Cameron and producer Dallas Austin, but portions of it were rewritten by Japanese songwriter Michico because Amuro felt the demo version was too harsh.

Musically, it is an uptempo Hip-hop-R&B hybrid that showcases a more aggressive and adventurous side to Amuro's music. The final product was recorded at Baybridge Studio in Tokyo, Japan. "Put 'Em Up" received favourable reviews from music critics for its production style, with some seeing it as a precursor to Amuro's move into R&B and hip-hop music. Furthermore, some critics hailed it as a standout among Amuro's discography.

Commercially, it was her lowest-performing single in Japan, peaking at number seven on the Oricon Singles Chart and selling over 40,000 copies, before being surpassed by "Big Boys Cry/Beautiful" in 2013. To promote the song, a music video was filmed featuring Amuro dancing in a construction site. Since its release, the song has appeared on several of Amuro's live tours, as well as her greatest hits album Best Fiction (2008).

== Background and composition ==
"Put 'Em Up"
A 21-second sample of "Put 'Em Up", which is a uptempo hip-hop and R&B number.

Amuro collaborated on new music with the Japanese project Suite Chic from 2002 to 2003. Amuro's collaboration with them inspired her to invite additional collaborators to showcase different aspects of herself through her music. In an interview with Viewsic (now Music On! TV), she revealed that she first heard an English demo of "Put 'Em Up" 2 or 3 years prior. She enjoyed the demo and imagined herself recording and dancing to it. However, she was dissatisfied with the lyrics, believing they were too harsh for her image and difficult to translate, and wanted it to be re-written.

Amuro enlisted Japanese songwriter Michico to rewrite the song in Japanese, whom previously worked with Amuro on Suite Chic. She believed that if Michico had not assisted with the song, its completion would have been postponed indefinitely. Michico contributed to the final product, which had English lyrics by Dallas Austin and Jasper Cameron. Austin also arranged, composed, and produced the song. It was recorded at Baybridge Studio in Tokyo, Japan, mixed by Kevin "KD" Davis, and mastered by Yasuji Yasuman Maeda. Musically, it's an uptempo hip-hop-R&B hybrid that showcases a more aggressive and adventurous side to Amuro's music.

== Release and promotion ==
Still from the music video showing Amuro in a construction site with additional backup dancers.

Avex Trax released "Put 'Em" Up" in Japan on July 16, 2003, in digital and physical formats. It serves as the third single from Amuro's sixth studio album Style (2003). The CD single and digital format include the single and B-side track "Exist for You," which was written by Michiko Ai and produced by Debra Killings, as well as each instrumental version. A promotional cassette tape was released the same month, and Avex Trax distributed a CD single to Hong Kong the following month. Furthermore, Dimension Point released the song worldwide via digital and streaming services.

A music video to "Put ‘Em Up" was directed by Ugichin, and was filmed at a construction site. Throughout the music video, Amuro dances with three male and three female dancers, with additional shots of her singing the track without participating in any dance sections; Amuro stated that she wanted to strongly incorporate her skills as a singer and a dancer in this video. The song and video were included in Best Fiction, with the video appearing on her video album Filmography 2001-2005 (2005). Additionally, the video won two categories at the 2004 MTV Video Music Awards Japan: Best R&B Video, and the Japan category for the Best Buzz Asia award. Since its release, "Put 'Em Up" has appeared on four of Amuro's concert tours and subsequent live releases: So Crazy Best Singles, Space of Hip-Pop, Live Style 2006, and Best Fiction.

== Reception ==
Music critics gave "Put 'Em Up" positive reviews. AllMusic recognised it as one of Amuro's best songs. Japanese magazine CDJournal reviewed the single, as well as its appearances on Style and Amuro's greatest hits album Best Fiction (2008). CDJournal praised the "physical" and "sexy" rhythm and string arrangements, describing it as "unquestionably cool." Furthermore, its appearance on Style was praised for its overall R&B and hip-hop-influenced sound. In their Best Fiction review, the magazine called it an "exciting dance tune" and praised writer Michiko Ai's vocal and songwriting contributions to the song.

Commercially, "Put 'Em Up" underperformed in Japan. It debuted at number seven on the Oricon Singles Chart, selling 21,725 units in its first week. It remained on the charts for six weeks in total, selling 41,149 units by September 2018. According to Oricon, it was Amuro's lowest-selling single at the time, but it was soon surpassed by her 2013 single "Big Boys Cry/Beautiful," which sold 32,000 copies in the country. In South Korea, "Put 'Em Up" peaked at number 77 on the Gaon International Digital Chart (now the Circle Digital Chart) in 2011.

== Formats and track listing ==
CD / digital / streaming formats

1. "Put 'Em Up" – 4:03
2. "Exist for You" – 4:19
3. "Put 'Em Up" (Instrumental) – 4:03
4. "Exist for You" (Instrumental) – 4:19

Cassette tape

1. "Put 'Em Up" – 4:03

== Credits and personnel ==
Credits adapted from the liner notes of Style.

Locations

- Recorded at Baybridge Studio, Tokyo, Japan

Personnel

- Namie Amuro – vocals
- Daisuke Imai - vocal director
- Dallas Austin - songwriter, arranger, composer, producer
- Jasper Cameron - songwriter
- Michico - songwriter
- Kevin "KD Davis - audio mixer
- Danny Zook - product manager, coordinator
- Jesse Oba - product manager, coordinator

== Charts ==
Chart performance for "Put 'Em Up"
Chart (2003)	Peak position
Japan (Oricon)	7

Chart (2011)	Peak position
South Korea International (Gaon)	77

== Sales ==
Region	Certification	Certified units/sales
Japan	—	41,149

== Release history ==
"Put 'Em Up" release history
Region	Date	Format	Label	Ref(s).
Japan	July 16, 2003	CD single; Cassette tape; digital download	Avex Trax	
Hong Kong	August 2003	CD single	Avex Trax	
Various	N/A	Digital download; streaming	Avex Trax; Dimension Point	
