= Style (Namie Amuro album) =

- The cover art includes their CD and regular cover edition replaced by old pressings.

Studio album by Namie Amuro
- Released: 10 December 2003
- Recorded: 2002–2003
- Studio: Baybridge Studio; Bazooka Studio; Bunkamura Studio; Maruni Studio; On Air Azabu Studio; Rojam Studio
- Genre: R&B; hip-pop
- Length: 53:07
- Label: Avex Trax
- Producer: Dallas Austin; Full Force; T.Kura; Michico; Teddy Riley

Namie Amuro chronology
Love Enhanced Single Collection (2002)	Style (2003)	Queen of Hip-Pop (2005)

Singles from Style
- 1. "Wishing on the Same Star" Released: 11 September 2002; 2. "Shine More" Released: 5 March 2003; 3. "Put 'Em Up" Released: 16 July 2003; 4. "So Crazy/Come" Released: 16 October 2003

Style is the sixth studio album by Japanese recording artist Namie Amuro. It was released on 10 December 2003, through Avex Trax. Her first studio album in nearly three years, Style follows her crossover into R&B and hip hop that began with the collaborative project Suite Chic in 2002. Although Amuro had dabbled with R&B beats in the past, this is her first original studio album to predominantly feature the actual genre. Style was her first album after the termination of her working relationship with longtime producer, Tetsuya Komuro, as well as her last collaboration with American record producer Dallas Austin to date.

Commercially, Style was a disappointment. It debuted at number four on the Oricon Albums Chart with first week sales of over 93,000 copies, the lowest of Amuro's career and her first not to sell over 100,000 during its first week. Despite being the lowest-selling album of her career, it was still certified Platinum for shipments of over 250,000 copies by the Recording Industry Association of Japan. The album spawned four top ten singles, "Wishing on the Same Star", "Shine More", "Put 'Em Up" and "So Crazy/Come". Amuro promoted Style by embarking on her first international concert tour titled the So Crazy Tour.

== Background and development ==
"This year I was also active as part of SUITE CHIC, and I wanted my solo work to link to that. This time I was able to choose what I wanted to do musically, and I feel like I was able to express quite a bit of what I like at the moment. In that sense, it's a really fitting title."

—Amuro talking about the title for Style.

In 2002, Amuro became a part of the collaborative R&B and hip hop project Suite Chic. Ryosuke Imai talked with the rapper Verbal about who was the Japanese Janet Jackson. They reached the conclusion that it was "Namie Amuro," who was struggling with a decline in popularity as a pop singer due to competition with younger stars such as Hikaru Utada and Ayumi Hamasaki. They produced demos without permission and proposed them to Amuro. The project featured up-and-coming DJs and hip-hop producers such as DJ Muro, Dabo and hip-hop singer Ai on the single "Uh Uh......," who would herself go on to find great success.

The album Style represents a major shift in Amuro's musical direction, and would set the tone for all of the singer's subsequent releases. It is also Amuro's first full-length urban contemporary record. She had previously recorded hip-hop music with Suite Chic, whose debut album When Pop Hits the Fan was released ten months earlier. Style is primarily made up of hip-hop and R&B influenced pop music and she would later coin the term "Hip-Pop." The song "Namie's Style" is her first work with her one of her future frequent collaborators T.Kura and Michico (she also translated the Dallas Austin-produced tracks "Put 'Em Up" and "So Crazy"). AllMusic described the album as "marginally more gritty", taking Amuro "closer in sound to her musical idol, Janet Jackson."

According to Amuro, there was no set theme, and she choose songs while imagining what she want to sing or dance to at a live show. Although the album is focused on R&B and hip-hop, it still features some pop songs; Amuro explained that certain styles of songs were included for variety. With this album, Amuro believed that she finally established her current "style" in a way that is easy to understand. In an interview she stated;

"Thanks to SUITE SHIC, I was able to do things my own way. I think I was able to become like this. Looking back, I think it was great that the people around me changed naturally without forcing me."

== Composition and content ==
"Namie's Style" is a hip-hop-inspired dance tune by T-Kura, with cool sprinkling of slang and boastful phrases such as "It's Namie's Style" over an oriental beat. "Indy Lady" features Teddy Riley's low-pitched, gritty hip-hop beat, and a rap reature from Zeebra. "Put 'Em Up" is a sharp and aggressive hip-hop tune. "So Crazy" is a hip-hop tune that naturally embodies "cool" yet "hot" emotions. "Don't Lie To Me" is a mellow love song with a gentle R&B rhythm. "Lovebite" is a medium tempo number with a melody provided by Takuro of the rock band Glay.

"Four Seasons" is a pop number with a smooth melody. "Fish" is a dance song with a Japanese-style arrangement and features Verbal from M-Flo and Arkitec from Mic Banditz. "Gimme More" is an R&B song with a heavy beat that is combined with a slightly Japanese-style arrangement. "As Good As" is a medium tempo number with a strong rock influence. "Shine More" is an R&B song with full-bodied vocals and urging minor-key strings. "Come" is a house-style number that features a euphoric, drowsy sound and vocals. "Wishing on the Same Star" is a power ballad written by Diane Warren. First editions of the album included two bonus tracks, the Mad Bear remix of "So Crazy" and the movie version of "Wishing on the Same Star". Several of the album's songs are covers: "Indy Lady" (a cover of "Independent Lady", originally by Toni Estes), "Come" (originally by Sophie Monk), "As Good As" (also recorded by WhatFor) and "Wishing on the Same Star" (originally by Keedy).

== Promotion ==
"Wishing on the Same Star" was used as the theme song of the 2002 film Inochi. "Shine More" and "So Crazy" were used as the Mandom "Lucido L Prism Magic Hair Color" commercial songs. "Four Seasons" was used as the theme song to the third InuYasha motion picture, Swords of an Honorable Ruler. The song "Come" has also been used as the 7th ending theme for InuYasha.

During this period, the number of people attending Amuro's live shows was decreasing; when her staff told her she couldn't fill the arena, she replied, "In that case we'll climb back up from scratch," and so began a hall tour. From November 2003 to April 2004, Amuro held a hall tour called the So Crazy Tour, which was a best-of album -like concert that mixed her own hits and Suite Chic songs. Media outlets reported that all of the concerts in Japan were sold-out immediately, therefore additional concerts were added. The So Crazy Tour was her first international concert tour, making stops at Taipei and Seoul. Rain joined her on stage on the final day of the Korean concert. A live DVD chronicling the tour titled Namie Amuro So Crazy Tour Featuring Best Singles 2003–2004 was released on September 23, 2004. It reached number ten on the Oricon DVD chart and sold about 71,000 copies.

== Reception ==
Commercially, Style underperformed in Japan. It debuted at number four on the Oricon Albums Chart, with 93,142 copies sold in its first week. This makes it Amuro's lowest first week sales for a studio set and her only to date not to debut in the top three. It dropped to number eleven the next week, selling 36,718 copies. The album stayed in the top twenty one last week, ranking at number seventeen and selling 45,379 copies. Style continued to rank for a total of 23 weeks. It sold 221,874 copies, becoming the 67th best-selling album of 2004. The album was certified platinum by the Recording Industry Association of Japan for selling 250,000 copies in February 2004.

== Track listing ==
No.	Title	Lyrics	Music	Arranger(s)	Length
1.	"Namie's Style"	T.Kura, Michico	T.Kura, Michico	T.Kura	4:03
2.	"Indy Lady" (featuring Zeebra)	Teddy Riley; Japanese lyrics Yuji Toriumi, Zeebra	Teddy Riley	Teddy Riley	5:19
3.	"Put 'Em Up"	Dallas Austin, Jasper Cameron; Japanese lyrics Michico	Dallas Austin	Dallas Austin	4:03
4.	"So Crazy"	Full Force, Jennifer "JJ" Johnson; Japanese lyrics Michico; Rap Tiger	Full Force, Jennifer "JJ" Johnson	Cobra Endo	4:34
5.	"Don't Lie to Me"	Jeff Lorber, Jeff Pescetto; Japanese lyrics Yuji Toriumi	Jeff Lorber, Jeff Pescetto	Jeff Lorber, Jeff Pescetto	3:42
6.	"Lovebite"	Takuro	Takuro	Akira	3:09
7.	"Four Seasons"	Jusme	Monk	Monk	3:47
8.	"Fish" (featuring Verbal & Arkitec)	Jusme, Verbal	Monk	Monk	4:27
9.	"Gimme More"	Ivan Johnson, Sylvia Bennett Smith; Japanese lyrics Namie Amuro	Ivan Johnson, Sylvia Bennett Smith	Cobra Endo	3:24
10.	"As Good As"	Nicolas Molinder, Joakim Persson, Pelle Anckarberg; Japanese lyrics Kenko-p	Nicolas Molinder, Joakim Persson, Pelle Anckarberg	Cobra Endo	3:28
11.	"Shine More"	Scott Nickoley, Sandra Pires, Paul Taylor; Japanese lyrics H.U.B.	Scott Nickoley, Sandra Pires, Paul Taylor	Cobra Endo	3:39
12.	"Come"	Kask, Mansson, Cunnah; Japanese lyrics Yuriko Mori	Kask, Mansson, Cunnah	Cobra Endo	4:34
13.	"Wishing on the Same Star"	Diane Warren; Japanese lyrics Kenko-p	Diane Warren	Masaki Iehara	4:58

Exclusive bonus tracks
No.	Title	Lyrics	Music	Length
14.	"So Crazy" (Mad Bear Mix)	Full Force, Jennifer "JJ" Johnson; Japanese lyrics Michico; Rap Tiger	Full Force, Jennifer "JJ" Johnson	4:26
15.	"Wishing on the Same Star" (Movie Version)	Diane Warren; Japanese lyrics Kenko-p	Diane Warren	3:12

== Personnel ==
- Namie Amuro – vocals, background vocals
- Arkitec – vocals
- Verbal – vocals
- Zeebra – vocals
- Mr. Blistah – additional vocals
- Clench – additional vocals
- Coyass – additional vocals
- Kareb James – background vocals
- L.L. Brothers – background vocals
- Yuko Kawai – background vocals
- Michico – background vocals
- Dave Cleveland – electric guitar
- Cobra Endo – multiple instruments
- Ron Harris – multiple instruments
- Jeff Lorber – keyboard, guitar
- Monk – multiple instruments
- Murayama-Kishiyama Strings – strings (bonus track: Wishing on the Same Star [Movie Version])
- Jeff Pescetto – guitar
- Yasuharu Nakanishi – piano (bonus track: Wishing on the Same Star [Movie Version])

== Production ==
- Producers – Full Force, Dallas Austin, T.Kura, Michico, Teddy Riley
- Arrangement – Akira, Dallas Austin, Cobra Endo, Masaki Iehara, T.Kura, Monk, Teddy Riley
- String Arrangement – Tatsuya Murayama
- Mixing – Rob Chiarelli, Kevin "KD" Davis, Junya Endo, T.Kura, Peter Mokran, Koji Morimoto, Yoshiaki Onishi, Teddy Riley, David Z.
- Vocal Direction – Akira, Mayumi Harada, Daisuke Imai, T.Kura, Michico, Kenji Sano
- Remixing – Mad Bear Sound System (bonus track: So Crazy[Mad Bear Mix])
- Photography – Kazunali Tajima
- Art Direction – Tyg

== Charts ==
=== Weekly charts ===
Chart (2003–2004)	Peak position
Japanese Albums (Oricon)	4

=== Year-end charts ===
Chart (2004)	Peak position
Japanese Albums (Oricon)	67

== Sales and certifications ==
Region	Certification	Certified units/sales
Japan (RIAJ)	Platinum	221,874
