= Playlouder =

UK-based online music magazine

- Editor: Jeremy Allen
- Categories: Music
- Founded: 2000
- First issue: 22 March 2000; 26 years ago
- Final issue: 2007; 19 years ago
- Company: PlayLouder Ltd
- Based in: United Kingdom
- Website: www.playlouder.com (defunct)

Playlouder was a British online music magazine based in London. It provided news, reviews, gig-listings, features, and other music-related content. The publisher later moved into providing music access, and claimed to be the world's first music service provider — an Internet service provider bundling access to music content along with broadband Internet access.

The magazine's publishing company presented the world's first virtual music festival in partnership with Glastonbury Festival in 2001, and was the online partner for Glastonbury Festival from 2000, webcasting full performances from bands including Gorillaz, Blur, Basement Jaxx, The White Stripes, Orbital, Coldplay, The Flaming Lips, Sigur Rós, Franz Ferdinand, Muse, and Bloc Party.

== History ==
Playlouder was founded in the UK in 2000 by Paul Hitchman and Jim Gottlieb, who ran the record labels Sugar and Candy in the 1990s. It started publication in March 2000. The site included music news, reviews, features and gig-listings.

In 2003 the publisher of Playlouder and the music company Thestate51Conspiracy formed an internet service provider, named Playlouder MSP. It offered broadband internet access combined with unlimited legal music downloading and other music applications for a monthly subscription fee. The service, touted as an alternative to unauthorized file-sharing services, licensed the right for its subscribers to legally share music and in return paid royalties to music rights owners. Dizzee Rascal, The White Stripes, and Stereophonics were early adopters, as well as labels such as Ninja Tune and Beggars Group.

Playlouder MSP was awarded the Popkomm IMEA award for innovation in 2004, later announcing deals with EMI and Sony BMG, as well as the UK indie label association AIM and the UK's leading collection society PRS for Music. Commercial launch of the service was scheduled for the summer of 2007.
