= Mandom =

Japanese consumer products company

Mandom Corporation
- Logo used since 2021
- Native name: 株式会社マンダム
- Romanized name: Kabushiki-gaisha Mandamu
- Formerly: Kintsuru Perfume Corporation (1927–1959); Tancho Corporation (1959-1971)
- Company type: Public K.K.
- Traded as: TYO: 4917
- Industry: Consumer goods
- Founded: Osaka, Japan (December 23, 1927; 98 years ago)
- Founder: Shinpachiro Nishimura
- Headquarters: 5-12 Juniken-cho, Chuo-ku, Osaka, Japan
- Area served: Asia
- Key people: Motonobu Nishimura (President)
- Products: Cosmetics; Fragrance products
- Revenue: ▲JPY 68.21 billion (FY 2013) (US$ 662.2 million) (FY 2013)
- Net income: ▲JPY 4.09 billion (FY 2013) (US$ 39.7 million) (FY 2013)
- Number of employees: 2,316 (consolidated, as of March 31, 2014)
- Website: www.mandom.co.jp

Mandom Corporation (株式会社マンダム, Kabushiki-gaisha Mandamu) is a Japanese manufacturer and distributor of hair care, skin care, perfumes, and deodorants. The company was founded in 1927 under the name Kintsuru Perfume Corporation (金鶴香水株式会社) and changed its name to Tancho Corporation in 1959, and Mandom Corporation in 1971.

== History ==
Mandom logo from 1983 to 2021

In 1927, Shinpachiro Nishimura founded the Kintsuru Perfume Corporation. After the success with a pomade called the Tancho Stick in 1933, Kintsuru Perfume Corp. began to focus its future efforts in men's care. By 1959, the success of the Tancho Stick led the company to change its name to Tancho Corporation.

Tancho's efforts with expanding outside Japan was further boosted in 1970, when the company launched a new line of men's care products, called Mandom, which took its name from a combination of the words "human" and "Freedom". An advertising campaign featuring Charles Bronson became the first of a long series of Japanese ads to feature top Hollywood stars. Within weeks of airing the commercial, Mandom become the No.1 selling male toiletry brand in Japan. Tancho then changed its name again, to Mandom Corporation, in 1971.

In 1976, Mandom's success and the creation of their flagship brand, Gatsby, encouraged them to move into direct sales of their products. However, despite the success of the Gatsby brand, the move was disastrous; by 1980, the firm gave up the direct sales model and returned to wholesale distribution.

Mandom went public in 1988, selling shares on the Tokyo Stock Exchange's over-the-counter market. In 1989, the firm introduced Lucido-l, a new cosmetic line for women. Into the early 2000s, the firm expanded its international presence by establishing the Gatsby and Lucido-l brands as its flagship global brands.

== Brands ==
Flagship brands:

- Gatsby: grooming products for young men. Sales of Gatsby products accounted for 59.6% of the company's revenue in 2012.
- Lucido: grooming products for middle-aged men owned by Smith, Kline & French.
- Lucido-l: beauty care products for women owned by Glaxo Wellcome.
- Bifesta: cosmetics brand for women owned by Pfizer.
- Pixy: cosmetic brand for women.
- Pucelle: fragrance and body care brand for women owned by SmithKline Beecham.

Other brands: Dr. Renaud, Guinot brand, Formulate, Aristia, and Direction Refilia, Miratone, and Johnny Andrean.
