= Suite Chic =

- Origin: Japan
- Genres: R&B; hip hop
- Years active: 2002–2003
- Labels: Avex Trax
- Past members: Namie Amuro; Verbal; Ryōsuke Imai

Suite Chic was a collaborative project between some of Japan's top and up-and-coming R&B and hip hop artists, writers, and producers, which debuted on December 18, 2002.

Suite Chic served as a vehicle for pop singer Namie Amuro, who at the time was establishing herself as a credible R&B artist following a decline in her popularity as a pop singer. Since the dissolution of the project many of its participants have gone on to greater mainstream success and the project revived Amuro's career.

In a late 2005 interview, Amuro said she would like to have Suite Chic make a comeback in 2006, but nothing came of it.

== History ==
Ryosuke Imai talked with Verbal of (m-flo) about who was the Japanese Janet Jackson. They reached the conclusion that it was "Namie Amuro", who at the time had seen her career fade following a hiatus. They produced demos without permission and proposed them to Amuro. The project featured up-and-coming DJs and hip-hop producers such as DJ Muro, Dabo and hip-hop singer Ai (singer) on the single "Uh Uh......", who would herself go on to great success.

Verbal named this project Suite Chic, a combination of "High-class (Suite) & Cool (Chic)".

== Discography ==
=== Albums ===
Year	Album	JP	Sales
2003	When Pop Hits the Fan	4	200,000+
2003	When Pop Hits the Lab	65	

=== Singles ===
Year	Single	JP	Sales	Album
2002	"Good Life" (featuring Firstklas) / "Just Say So" (featuring Verbal)	35	Limited to 30,000 copies.	When Pop Hits the Fan
2003	"Uh Uh,,,,,," (featuring Ai) / "Baby Be Mine"	22	Limited to 30,000 copies.	When Pop Hits the Fan

=== Video albums ===
- 26 March 2003 - When Pop Hits the Pix

== Participants ==
- Firstklas (Riyosuke Imai+Zeebra)
- Verbal
- Namie Amuro
- Ai
- Dabo
- XBS
- Daisuke Imai
- Akira
- DJ Muro
- DJ Watarai
- Tsutchie (Shakkazombie)
- DJ Celory (Soul Scream)
- Yakko for Aquarius
- Michico

etc.
