= Strictly East Coast Sneaky Flute Music =

Remix album by Swirlies
- Released: 1998
- Genre: Electronica; experimental music; indie rock
- Label: Taang!
- Producer: Rich Costey

Swirlies chronology
They Spent Their Wild Youthful Days in the Glittering World of the Salons (1996)	Strictly East Coast Sneaky Flute Music (1998)	Damon Andy Rob Ron: The Yes Girls (2000)

Professional ratings
Review scores
Source	Rating
AllMusic	4/5 stars

Strictly East Coast Sneaky Flute Music is the third full-length album by Boston indie rock band Swirlies. The album comprises remixes of songs from their previous album, They Spent Their Wild Youthful Days in the Glittering World of the Salons, along with soundbites and forays into experimental music. Taang! Records released Strictly East Coast Sneaky Flute Music in 1998 on CD, and also re-packaged most of it as the first disc of a double LP. with the bulk of Salons as the second.

== Background ==
Swirlies released their first dance remix following their first LP in 1993 and soon began incorporating more electronic instruments into their live set and in composing their next album. As band members' academic pursuits fueled line-up changes, the group found themselves drummerless for a spell and adopted a drum machine to fill out its rhythm section. Remaining guitarist Damon Tutunjian and bassist Andy Bernick took this as an opportunity to explore further possibilities for collaboration, and so invited several East Coast electronica artists to remix their songs. Guest DJs included Swirlies producer Rich Costey, trip-hop artist DJ Spooky, and Swirlies then-new drummer Adam Pierce from American shoegaze outfit Mice Parade.

== Songs ==
About half of the album's tracks are DJ remixes of previously released Swirlies songs. The others are experiments by individual band members, archival practice recordings of the band jamming, or field recordings like those that appear on other Swirlies records. The compact disc version of the album closes with a hidden track of Swirlies covering the song "Glue" by 1980s Boston hardcore punk band S.S. Decontrol. Performed live at a music festival, the song was a mainstay for Swirles' original line up, harkening back to the members' punk rock roots.

== Charts and reviews ==
The album charted on both CMJ's "Radio 200" and 1998 "Core Radio" lists.

== Track listing ==
Compact disc
1 "Untitled"
2. "Version. In Harmony Retrograde Transposition" (Remix: DJ Spooky)
3. "Sea Wolf Edit" (Remix: Sneaky Flute Orchestra)
4. "Sunn. Drunk In Your Sled Version" (Remix: Adam Pierce)
5. "Sterling Moss Slippy Mix" (Remix: Bob Brass)
6. "T. Fuzz Mix" (Remix: River Of Action)
7. "...Not Like A Geese, Like A Swan!"
8. "A Sneaky Flute Field Recording" (From The A. Bennick Sneaky Flute Archives)
9. "Version. France vs. Sebring" (Remix: N^{2}O)
10. "Version. San Cristobal De Las Casas" (Remix: Rich Costey)
11. "Excerpt. Boys, Protect Yourselves From Aliens" (Remix: Carlos Slinger)
12. "Who Was In Scituate on the Fourth of July? Mix" (Remix: Number One Dog vs. Mice Parade)

"Symphony of the Sneaky Flutes" (Damon Tuntunjian Conducts the Sneaky Flute Orchestra, Scituate, MA)br>

13. "Adagio Affettuaso Ed Appassionato"
14. "Scherzo Allegro"
15. "Andante"

16 "Torr's Empathy Jam"

Double LP

Tracks 1–4 and 6–8 comprised side A and tracks 9 and 11–15 made up side B of the album's vinyl release. Most of the group's previous album, They Spent Their Wild Youthful Days in the Glittering World of the Salons, appeared as sides C and D.

== Additional album credits ==
- Alan Douches: Mastering
- Rich Costey: Engineer, Mixing, Producer, Programming
- Rudi Reitberg: Design
- Wolfgang Amadeus Mozart: Composer
