= Saudade =

Emotional state

Saudade (1899), by Almeida Júnior

In Portuguese and Galician, saudade (Note: English: /saʊˈdɑːdə/; European Portuguese: [sɐwˈðaðɨ]; Brazilian Portuguese: [sawˈdadʒi], Northeast Brazil: [sawˈdadi]; Galician: [sawˈðaðɪ]; plural saudades.) is an emotional state of melancholic or profoundly nostalgic longing for a beloved yet absent someone-or-something. It derives from the Latin word for "solitude". It is often associated with a repressed understanding that one might never encounter the object of longing ever again. It is a recollection of feelings, experiences, places, or events, often elusive, that cause a sense of separation from the exciting, pleasant, or joyous sensations they once caused. Duarte Nunes Leão defines saudade as, "Memory of something with a desire for it". In Brazil, the day of saudade is officially celebrated on 30 January; it is not a widely acknowledged day in Portugal.

== History ==
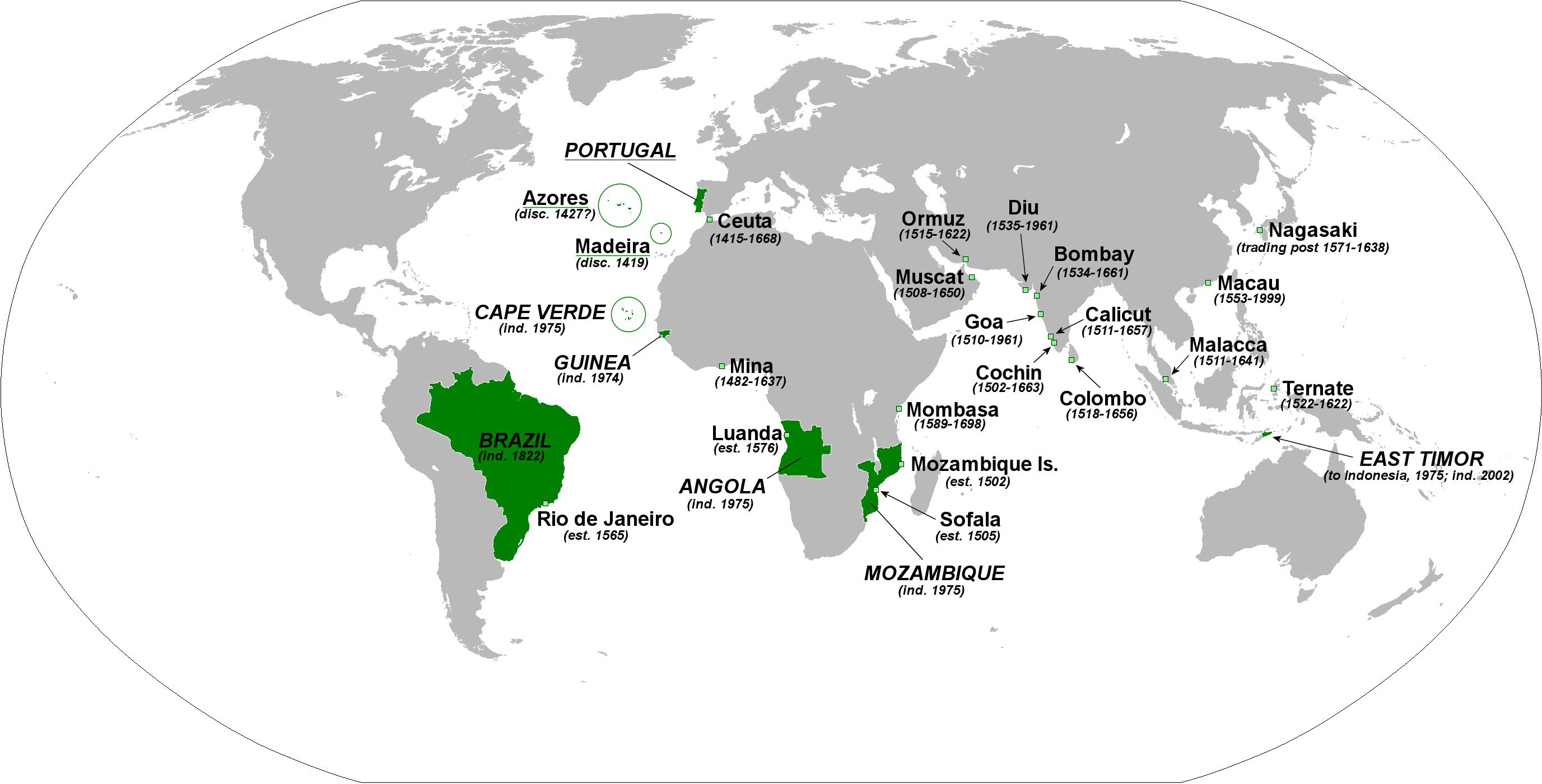
The distant lands of the Portuguese Empire made a special longing for the loved ones of explorers and sailors.

Saudade ultimately derives from the Latin solitās, solitātis, meaning "solitude". The word saudade was used in the Cancioneiro da Ajuda (13th century), in the Cancioneiro da Vaticana and by poets of the time of King Denis of Portugal (reigned 1279–1325). Some specialists argue that the word may have originated during the Great Portuguese Discoveries, expressing and giving meaning to the sadness felt about those who departed on journeys to unknown seas and often disappeared in shipwrecks, died in battle, or simply never returned. Those who stayed behind—mostly women and children—suffered deeply in their absence. However, Portuguese discoveries started in 1415 and the word has been found in earlier texts. The Reconquista may also offer a plausible genesis.

The state of mind has subsequently become a "Portuguese way of life": a constant feeling of absence, the sadness of something that's missing, wistful longing for completeness or wholeness and the yearning for the return of what is now gone, a desire for presence as opposed to absence—as it is said in Portuguese, a strong desire to matar as saudades (lit. 'to kill the saudades').

In the latter half of the 20th century, saudade became associated with the longing for one's homeland, as hundreds of thousands of Portuguese-speaking people left in search of better futures in South America, North America, and Western Europe. Besides the implications derived from a wave of emigration trend from the motherland, historically speaking saudade is the term associated with the decline of Portugal's role in world politics and trade. During the so-called "Golden Age", synonymous with the era of discovery, Portugal rose to the status of a world power, and its monarchy became the richest in Europe and one of the richest global empires in history. But with the competition from other European nations, the country went both colonially and economically into a prolonged period of decay. This period of decline and resignation from the world's culture coincides with the cultural rising of saudade in Portuguese society.

== Definition ==
The Dicionário Houaiss da Língua Portuguesa defines saudade (or saudades) as "A somewhat melancholic feeling of incompleteness. It is related to thinking back on situations of privation due to the absence of someone or something, to move away from a place or thing, or to the absence of a set of particular and desirable experiences and pleasures once lived."

The dictionary from the Royal Galician Academy, on the other hand, defines saudade as an "intimate feeling and mood caused by the longing for something absent that is being missed. This can take different aspects, from concrete realities (a loved one, a friend, the motherland, the homeland...) to the mysterious and transcendent. It is quite prevalent and characteristic of the Galician-Portuguese world, but it can also be found in other cultures."

=== Related words ===
Saudade is a word in Portuguese and Galician that claims no direct translation in English. However, a close translation in English would be "desiderium." Desiderium is defined as an ardent desire or longing, especially a feeling of loss or grief for something lost. Desiderium comes from the word desiderare, meaning to long for. Connections between desiderium and nostalgia have also been drawn; the former can be seen as expressing the latter for things that can't be experienced any more, or things that someone may have never experienced themselves.

In Portuguese, "Tenho saudades tuas" or "Estou com saudades de ti/você" translates as "I have (feel) saudade of you" meaning "I miss you", but carries a much stronger tone. In fact, one can have saudade of someone whom one is with, but have some feeling of loss towards the past or the future. For example, one can have "saudade" towards part of the relationship or emotions once experienced for/with someone, though the person in question is still part of one's life, as in "Tenho saudade do que fomos" (I feel "saudade" of the way we were). Another example can illustrate this use of the word saudade: "Que saudade!" indicating a general feeling of longing, whereby the object of longing can be a general and undefined entity/occasion/person/group/period etc. This feeling of longing can be accompanied or better described by an abstract will to be where the object of longing is.

Despite being hard to translate in full, saudade has equivalent words in other cultures, and is often related to music styles expressing this feeling such as the blues for African-Americans, añoranza in Spain, Sehnsucht in German, dor in Romania, Tizita in Ethiopia, Hiraeth in Welsh, or Assouf for the Tuareg people, appocundria in Neapolitan, or mall in Albanian. In Slovak, the word is clivota or cnenie, and in Czech, the word is stesk. In Turkish, the word Hasret meaning longing, yearning or nostalgia has similar connotations, as does the Polish “tęsknota”.

The similar melancholic music style is known in Bosnia-Herzegovina as sevdalinka (from Turkish sevda': infatuation, ultimately from Arabic سَوْدَاء sawdā': 'black [bile]', translation of the Greek μέλαινα χολή, mélaina cholē, from which the term melancholy is derived).

== Elements ==
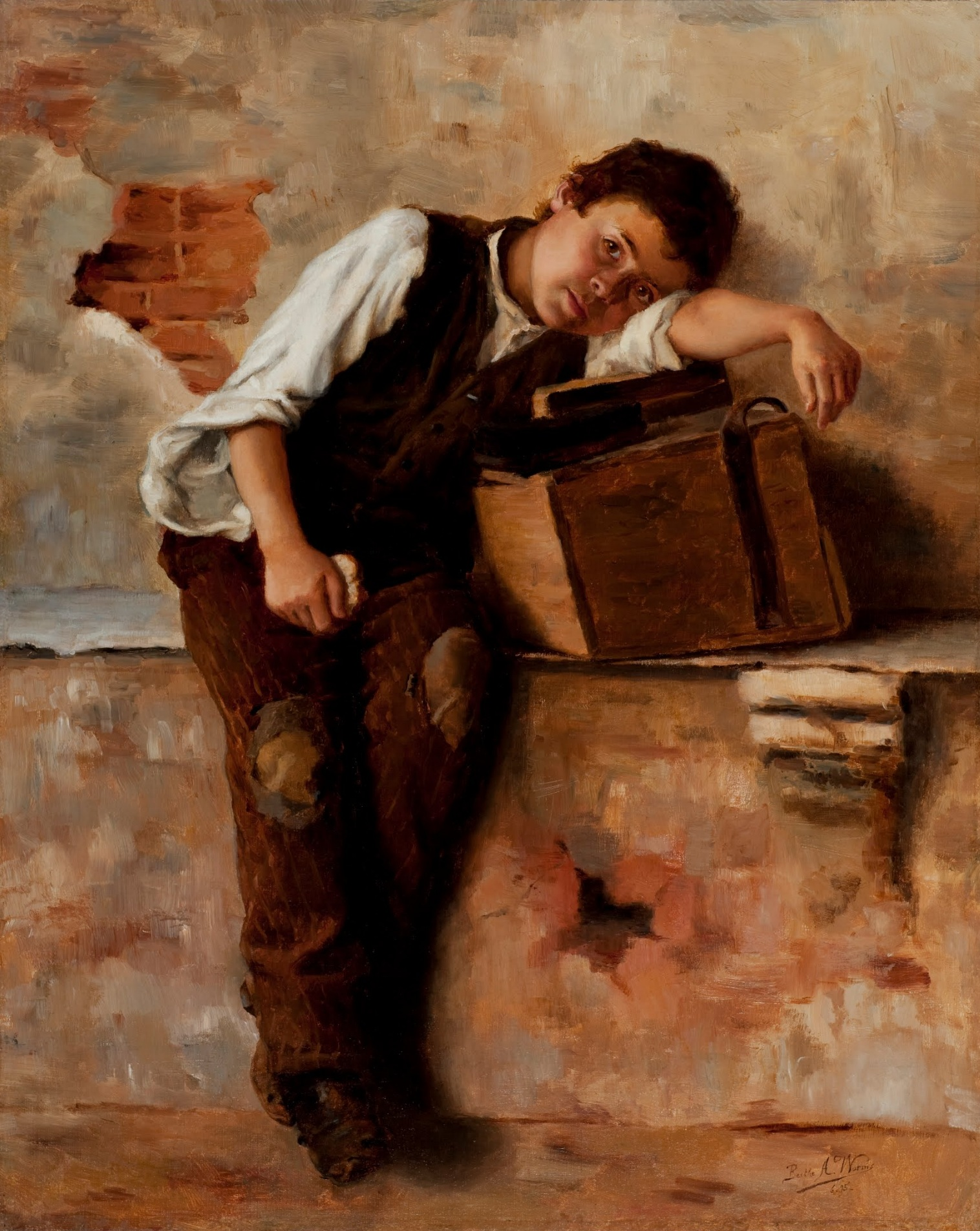
Saudades de Nápoles (Missing Naples), 1895 by Bertha Worms

Saudade is similar but not equal to nostalgia, a word that also exists in Portuguese.

In the book In Portugal of 1912, A. F. G. Bell writes:

The famous saudade of the Portuguese is a vague and constant desire for something that does not and probably cannot exist, for something other than the present, a turning towards the past or towards the future; not an active discontent or poignant sadness but an indolent dreaming wistfulness.

A stronger form of saudade may be felt towards people and things whose whereabouts are unknown, such as old ways and sayings; a lost lover who is sadly missed; a faraway place where one was raised; loved ones who have died; feelings and stimuli one used to have; and the faded, yet golden memories of youth. Although it relates to feelings of melancholy and fond memories of things/people/days gone by, it can be a rush of sadness coupled with a paradoxical joy derived from acceptance of fate and the hope of recovering or substituting what is lost by something that will either fill in the void or provide consolation.

To F. D. Santos, Saudade as a noun has become a longing for longing itself:

There was an evolution from saudades (plural) to Saudade (singular, preferably written with a capital S), which became a philosophical concept. ... Saudade has an object; however, its object has become itself, for it means 'nostalgia for nostalgia', a meta-nostalgia, a longing oriented toward the longing itself. It is no more the Loved One or the 'Return' that is desired, based on a sense of loss and absence. Now, Desire desires Desire itself, as in the poetry of love for love's sake in Arabic, or as in Lope de Vega's famous epigram about the Portuguese who was crying for his love for Love itself. Or, rather, as poetess Florbela Espanca put it, I long for the longings I don't have ('Anoitecer', Espanca 1923).

== In the arts ==
=== Music ===
As with all emotions, saudade has been an inspiration for many songs and compositions. "Sodade" (saudade in Cape Verdean Creole) is the title of the Cape Verde singer Cesária Évora's most famous song. Étienne Daho, a French singer, also produced a song of the same name. The Good Son, a 1990 album by Nick Cave and the Bad Seeds, was heavily informed by Cave's mental state at the time, which he has described as saudade. He told journalist Chris Bohn: "When I explained to someone that what I wanted to write about was the memory of things that I thought were lost for me, I was told that the Portuguese word for this feeling was saudade. It's not nostalgia but something sadder."

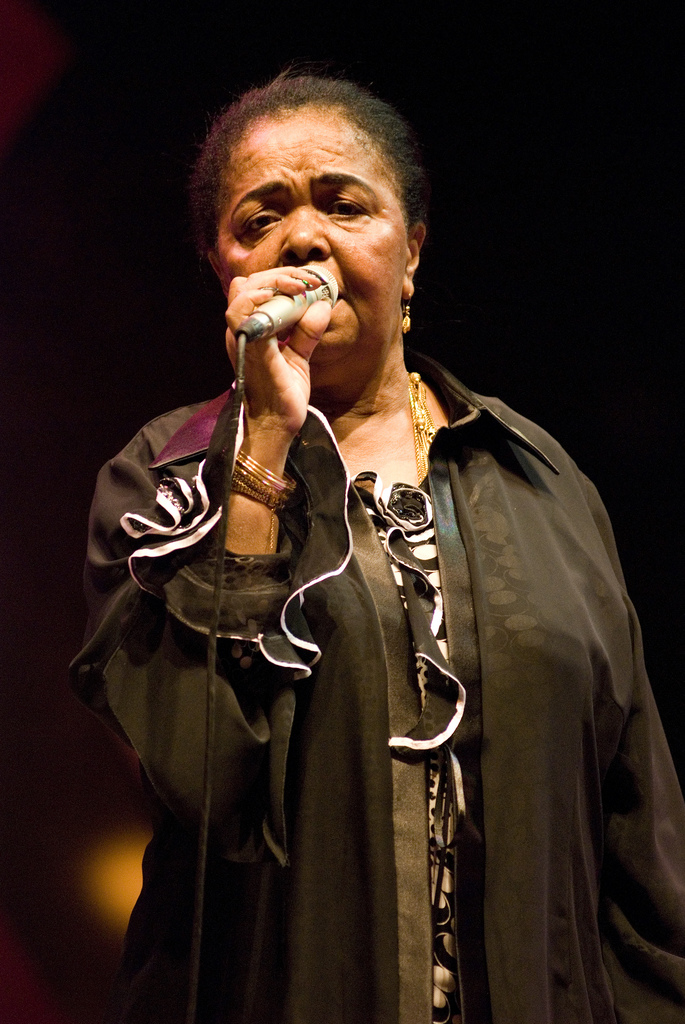
Cape Verdean singer Cesária Évora had her biggest hit singing about saudade.

The usage of saudade as a theme in Portuguese music goes back to the 16th century, the golden age of Portugal. Saudade, as well as love suffering, is a common theme in many villancicos and cantigas composed by Portuguese authors; for example: "Lágrimas de Saudade" (tears of saudade), which is an anonymous work from the Cancioneiro de Paris. Fado is a Portuguese music style, generally sung by a single person (the fadista) along with a Portuguese guitar. The most popular themes of fado are saudade, nostalgia, jealousy, and short stories of the typical city quarters. Fado and saudade are intertwined key ideas in Portuguese culture. The word fado comes from Latin fatum meaning "fate" or "destiny". Fado is a musical cultural expression and recognition of this unassailable determinism which compels the resigned yearning of saudade, a bitter-sweet, existential yearning and hopefulness towards something over which one has no control.

Spanish singer Julio Iglesias, whose father is a Galician, speaks of saudade in his song "Un Canto a Galicia" (which roughly translates as "a song/chant for Galicia"). In the song, he passionately uses the phrase to describe a deep and sad longing for his motherland, Galicia. He also performs a song called "Morriñas", which describes the Galicians as having a deeply strong saudade.

The Paraguayan guitarist Agustin Barrios wrote several pieces invoking the feeling of saudade, including Choro de Saudade and Preludio Saudade. The term is prominent in Brazilian popular music, including the first bossa nova song, "Chega de Saudade" ("No more saudade", usually translated as "No More Blues"), written by Tom Jobim. Jazz pianist Bill Evans recorded the tune "Saudade de Brasil" numerous times. In 1919, on returning from two years in Brazil, the French composer Darius Milhaud composed a suite, Saudades do Brasil, which exemplified the concept of saudade. "Saudade (Part II)" is also the title of a flute solo by the band Shpongle. The fado singer Amália Rodrigues typified themes of saudade in some of her songs. J-Rock band Porno Graffitti has a song entitled "サウダージ", "Saudaaji" transliterated ("Saudade"). The city pop guitarist Masayoshi Takanaka has an album titled Saudade. The alternative rock band Love And Rockets has a song named "Saudade" on their album Seventh Dream of Teenage Heaven. June 2012 brought Bearcat's release of their self-titled indie album that included a song called "Saudade".

The Dutch jazz/Rock guitarist Jan Akkerman recorded a composition called "Saudade", the centerpiece of his 1996 album Focus in Time. The Belgian electronic music band Arsenal recorded a song called "Saudade" on their album Outsides (2005). The jazz fusion group Trio Beyond, consisting of John Scofield, Jack DeJohnette, and Larry Goldings released in 2006 an album dedicated to drummer Tony Williams (1945–1997), called Saudades. Dance music artist Peter Corvaia released a progressive house track entitled "Saudade" on HeadRush Music, a sub-label of Toes in the Sand Recordings. New York City post-rock band Mice Parade released an album entitled Obrigado Saudade in 2004. Chris Rea also recorded a song entitled "Saudade Part 1 & 2 (Tribute To Ayrton Senna)" as a tribute to Ayrton Senna, the Brazilian three-times Formula One world champion killed on the track in May 1994. There is an ambient/noise/shoegazing band from Portland, Oregon, named Saudade. The rock band Extreme has a Portuguese guitarist Nuno Bettencourt; the influence of his heritage can be seen in the band's album Saudades de Rock. During recording, the mission statement was to bring back musicality to the medium. "Nancy Spain", a song by Barney Rush, made famous by an adaptation by Christy Moore, is another example of the use of saudade in contemporary Irish music, the chorus of which is:

"No matter where I wander I'm still haunted by your name
The portrait of your beauty stays the same
Standing by the ocean wondering where you've gone
If you'll return again
Where is the ring I gave to Nancy Spain?"

American singer/songwriter Grayson Hugh wrote a song called "Saudade" that he performed with jazz guitarist Norman Johnson on Johnson's 2013 album "Get It While You Can".

The British musician Steve Cobby released an album called Saudade in March 2014 on DÉCLASSÉ Recordings.

Washington DC electronica duo Thievery Corporation released the studio album Saudade in 2014 via their Eighteenth Street Lounge Music label.

Brazilian singer Ana Frango Elétrico released a song called "Saudade" as the opening track on their 2019 album "Little Electric Chicken Heart".

Composer Cody Matthew Johnson alongside former Sick Puppies frontman and singer-songwriter Shim were hired by Capcom to compose the end credits song "Saudade" for the 2019 video game Resident Evil 2.

A. R. Rahman's soundtrack for the 2020 Hindi film Dil Bechara features an instrumental track called "The Horizon of Saudade".

Icelandic music producer Ólafur Arnalds released the single "Saudade (When We Are Born)" in 2021.

In 2022, Portuguese singer Maro released a song called "Saudade, saudade" and represented Portugal with it in the Eurovision Song Contest 2022 in Turin, Italy. The song placed 9th in the grand final.

In 2023, Brazilian singer Luísa Sonza and American singer Demi Lovato released the song "Penhasco2", in which they sing the phrase "Saudade não tem tradução" ("Saudade has no translation"), highlighting the widespread idea that the concept of saudade cannot be fully conveyed in other languages.

=== Literature ===
The Portuguese author Fernando Pessoa's posthumous collection of writings The Book of Disquiet is written almost entirely in a tone of saudade, and deals with themes of nostalgia and alienation. Australian author Suneeta Peres Da Costa's novella Saudade follows Maria-Christina, a young girl from a Goan immigrant family in Angola of the 1960s, growing up in a political hierarchy of racism and colonialism.

=== Film and television ===
In an episode of the Colombian telenovela Yo soy Betty, la fea, Brazilian actress Taís Araújo (guest-starring as herself) discussed the concept of saudade with the heartbroken titular character.

== Variations ==
The Spanish region of Galicia (red) lies north of Portugal and shares a cultural history of saudade.

Saudade is also associated with Galicia, where it is used similarly to the word morriña (longingness). Yet, morriña often implies a deeper stage of saudade, a "saudade so strong it can even kill," as the Galician saying goes. Morriña was a term often used by emigrant Galicians when talking about the Galician motherland they left behind. Although saudade is also a Galician word, the meaning of longing for something that might return is generally associated with morriña. A literary example showing the understanding of the difference and the use of both words is the song Un canto a Galicia by Julio Iglesias. The word used by Galicians speaking Spanish has spread and become common in all Spain and even accepted by the Royal Spanish Academy.

In Portugal, morrinha is a word to describe sprinkles, while morrinhar means "to sprinkle." (The most common Portuguese equivalents are chuvisco and chuviscar, respectively.) Morrinha is also used in northern Portugal for referring to sick animals, for example of sheep dropsy, and occasionally to sick or sad people, often with irony. It is also used in some Brazilian regional dialects for the smell of wet or sick animals.

In Goa, India, which was a Portuguese colony until 1961, some Portuguese influences still remain. A suburb of Margão, Goa's largest city, has a street named Rua de Saudades. It was aptly named because that very street has the Christian cemetery, the Hindu shmashana (cremation ground) and the Muslim qabrastan (cemetery). Most people living in the city of Margão who pass by this street would agree that the name of the street could not be any other, as they often think fond memories of a friend, loved one, or relative whose remains went past that road.

In Cape Verdean Creole there is the word sodadi (also spelled sodade), originated in the Portuguese saudade and with the same meaning.

== See also ==
- Attachment theory
- Desiring-production
- Good old days
- Grief
- Han
- Hiraeth
- Mono no aware
- Nostalgia
- Sehnsucht
- Saudosismo
- Sevdalinka
