= Blonder Tongue Audio Baton =

Studio album by Swirlies
- Released: March 26, 1993
- Recorded: June 1992 – November 1992
- Studios: Q Division, Boston
- Genres: Shoegaze; dream pop
- Length: 42:36
- Label: Taang!
- Producer: Rich Costey

Swirlies chronology
What to Do About Them (1992)	Blonder Tongue Audio Baton (1993)	They Spent Their Wild Youthful Days in the Glittering World of the Salons (1996)

Singles from Blonder Tongue Audio Baton
- 1. "Park The Car By The Side Of The Road" Released: 1992; 2. "Wrong Tube" Released: 1993

Professional ratings
Review scores
Source	Rating
AllMusic	4.5/5 stars
Tiny Mix Tapes	4/5

Blonder Tongue Audio Baton (sometimes spelled Blondertongueaudiobaton) is the debut full-length studio album by Swirlies, released in 1993. The band recorded the majority of the album in the summer of 1992 at Q Division Studios, Boston with engineer/co-producer Rich Costey. It is possibly their best-known and most critically praised work, with many critics citing it as a "lo-fi" answer to My Bloody Valentine's Loveless. AllMusic would later call it "a mainstay of early-'90s indie music," and in 2016 Pitchfork ranked the album at number 11 on its list of the 50 best shoegaze albums of all time.

== Background ==
Swirlies began work on Blonder Tongue Audio Baton after signing to Taang! Records in the summer of 1992 and compiling the EP, What To Do Abut Them. The band booked time at Q Division Studios with engineer/co-producer Rich Costey to record a dozen songs that the group had been playing live for the past two years. At Q Division Swirlies made use of the studio's collection of vintage keyboards, including Mellotron and Moog synthesizers, to widen the palette of sounds they'd previously created as a guitar-bass-drums indie rock group. Drummers Kevin March and Mark Rivers from Boston bands Dambuilders and Cavedogs were brought on for most of the album's tracks as Swirlies founding drummer Ben Drucker only played on two songs during the Q Division recording session. A different arrangement of the band's 1992 single, "Park the Car (by the Side of the Road)" (named for a song lyric by the Smiths) was recorded but scrapped in favor of the earlier version. Singer/guitarists Damon Tutunjian and Seana Carmody also recorded the songs "His Life of Academic Freedom" and "Wait Forever" at home on 4-track cassette, and artist Ron Regé, Jr. contributed between-song soundbites as he had on the group's prior EP.

A spoken word interlude appears as a hidden track at the end of the album (or at the end of side one of its vinyl edition) featuring a conversation about the defensive capabilities of moths to ward off predators. The speaker relates about a science documentary he had watched and marvels as to how scientists were adapting the defensive secretions of moths to be used in antiviral medicines for humans, much as those that would be developed for vaccines against coronavirus three decades later. The recording is accompanied by a backmasked track by Boston noise rock band Madbox and Lou Barlow's solo project Sentridoh.

The album takes its name from an obscure and expensive audio graphic equalizer, made by Blonder Tongue Labs from 1959–61, which was used extensively while tracking the album. Taang! Records released the album in February 1993 and the band toured to support it.

== Music ==
Heather Phares of AllMusic said that Blonder Tongue Audio Baton "melds noisy guitars, samples, and sweet girl-boy vocals into a disheveled take on dream pop," and also "combines the elements of the band's early work with more complexity." Writing for Pitchfork, Stephen Thomas Erlewine explained: "Blonder Tongue Audio Baton appeared right as shoegaze was entering its decline in the UK and lo-fi was ascending in the U.S. The Swirlies existed in the center of these two scenes, their waves of distortion feeling tinny instead of full, their wistful harmonies seeming woozy instead of ethereal. By blurring such distinctions and threading pulsating, semi-electronic collages throughout Blonder Tongue Audio Baton, the Swirlies were somewhat out of step with indie-rock in the '90s. But their debut now seems prescient, particularly in the tussles of gnarled noise on 'Pancake' or the precisely rendered pop of 'Bell,' which floats upward on conjoining harmonies and insistent strums—sounds that remain part of the indie-pop firmament."

== Legacy ==
Blonder Tongue Audio Baton was co-lead singer Seana Carmody's last full album with the group before she formed the Farfisa-driven and somewhat more pop-oriented Syrup USA. In 2015 most of Swirlies' original line up reunited to perform the entirety of Blonder Tongue Audio Baton as a live set in Brooklyn on the 4th of July as part of the band's 25th anniversary tour. Taang! Records reissued the album on LP in 2016.

Heather Phares of AllMusic wrote: "Where so many dreamy bands polish their sound into pristine oblivion, the Swirlies create a hazy atmosphere that is evocative and unpretentious. [...] A mainstay of early-'90s indie music, Blonder Tongue Audio Baton still sounds fresh today."

== Track listing ==
All tracks by Swirlies

1. "Bell (Prelude)" – 0:12
2. "Bell" – 4:29
3. "Vigilant Always" – 5:10
4. "His Love Just Washed Away" – 5:24
5. "His Life of Academic Freedom" – 2:07
6. "Pancake" – 3:15
7. "Jeremy Parker" – 4:14
8. "Park the Car (by the Side of the Road)" – 5:04
9. "Tree Chopped Down" – 3:12
10. "Wrong Tube" – 5:06
11. "Wait Forever" – 4:18

An untitled spoken word track appears on the album's vinyl edition following a locked groove after "Pancake," the last song listed on side one. On digital versions of the album, the dialogue comprises the last 90 seconds of the track listed as "Wait Forever" after a minute of silence.

== Brokedick Car EP ==
The five-song Brokedick Car EP was released later in 1993 on vinyl, CD, and cassette tape as a follow-up to Blonder Tongue Audio Baton, and featured different mixes of "Wrong Tube" and "Pancake" from the album. The EP's final track was "House of Pancake", an electronica remix of "Pancake" by Rich Costey and NYC electronic musician Gomi. The track comprised Swirlies' first foray into electronic music. Two more experimental tracks, the atonal instrumental "Labrea Tarpit" and the Pavementesque art punk song "You're Just Jealous", rounded out Brokedick Car. These were the last songs recorded by the band's original lineup, as Drucker and Carmody soon left the group.

=== Brokedick Car track listing ===
1. "Wrong Tube (Edit)" – 4:08
2. "Labrea Tarpit" – 1:58
3. "Pancake Cleaner" – 3:15
4. "You're Just Jealous" – 2:58
5. "House of Pancake" – 6:31

== Singles ==
- The song "Park the Car by the Side of the Road" is a remixed and partially re-recorded version of the version appearing on the band's "Error" 7-inch recorded in 1991. The band had recorded a new arrangement of the song for the album, but shelved it in favor of this touched up version of the original.
- Taang! also released a 7-inch version of the Brokedick Car EP with the alternate mix of "Wrong Tube" as the A-side and "Labrea Tarpit"/"You're Just Jealous" as the B-side
- One additional song, "Trudy", was also recorded for the Blonder Tongue album, but was also shelved. The song was re-recorded on 8-track in late 1993 and appeared as the November release of Simple Machines' 1994 Working Holiday! split 7-inch series. The 8-track version was released again a decade later as a bonus track on the Japanese release of Cats of the Wild (Vol. 2).
- A lo-fi 4-track demo version of "His Love Just Washed Away" from 1991 was released on a split single with the band Iris in 1996. The Swirlies' track is followed by sped-up tape of an impromptu project called the Montclair Punk Rockers.
- A 1994 Peel Session of "Jeremy Parker" (with some Alan Parsons Project lyrics adlibbed by guitarist Seana Carmody) would later make up the A-side of the group's "Orca vs. Dragon" single.

== Personnel ==
=== Swirlies ===
- Damon Tuntunjian – Guitar, vocals, Casio VL-5, Minimoog, Chamberlin (incorrectly listed in the liner notes as a Mellotron)
- Seana Carmody – Guitar, vocals, Minimoog, Chamberlin (incorrectly listed in the liner notes as a Mellotron)
- Andy Bernick – Bass, radio, artwork
- Ben Drucker – Drums (7, 8, 9 on Blonder Tongue, 2, 4 on Brokedick Car)

=== Additional personnel ===
- Kevin March (Dambuilders) – Drums (2,10 on Blonder Tongue, 1 on Brokedick Car))
- Mark "Spongey" Rivers (Cavedogs) – Drums (3, 4, 6 on Blonder Tongue, 3 on Brokedick Car, as well as the outtakes for "Park the Car" and "Trudy")
- Ron Regé, Jr. – Art direction, design, masking tape pull recordist on "Bell (Prelude)"
- Morgan Andrews – Chimp guitar on "His Life of Academic Freedom"
- Peter J. Haskett and Raymond Huffman – Prelude to "Park the Car (by the Side of the Road)"
- Dan – Moth talk recordist
- Sentridoh and Madbox – Moth talk ambient and cover-up music
- Swirlies – Producer, Mixing, engineer
- Rich Costey – Engineer, mixing, co-producer
- Kerri Bennet – Artwork, art direction, design
