= The Cloudy Dreamer =

EP by Olivia
- Released: January 17, 2007
- Recorded: 2005–2006
- Genre: Rock/Alternative
- Language: Japanese/English
- Label: Cutting Edge

Olivia mini-album chronology
The Return of the Chlorophyll Bunny (2003)	The Cloudy Dreamer (2007)	Trinka Trinka (2008)

CD+DVD Cover
- CD+DVD version of "The Cloudy Dreamer"

The Cloudy Dreamer is the fifth mini-album by Olivia Lufkin, released on January 17, 2007. The mini-album debuted at #15 on the Oricon Weekly Charts, making it Olivia's most successful album to date.

Two versions of the album were released, a CD Only version and a CD+DVD version. The DVD includes the PV "Stars Shining Out" and five live performances from Olivia's July 25 concert at Shibuya O-West. In addition to new songs and the A Little Pain song with the song "Wish (English version)", the mini-album also features "Dream Catcher", which was used as the ending theme for the live action television drama series of Jigoku Shōjo and "If You Only Knew", which was used as main theme for the Korean drama of The Snow Queen.

First press limited editions of the CD+DVD version included Olivia's Art & Photo Mini-Book and Olivia's Art & Photo Poster.

== Track listings ==
CD Track listing

1. "If You Only Knew"
2. "Stars Shining Out"
3. "Dream Catcher"
4. "Who's Gonna Stop It?"
5. "Cloudy World"
6. "Cut Me free"
7. "Wish" (English ver.)
8. "A Little Pain"

DVD Track listing

1. "Stars Shining Out" (PV)
2. "Alone in Our Castle" (Live at Shibuya O-West 25 July 2006)
3. "Let Go" (Live at Shibuya O-West 25 July 2006)
4. "A Little Pain" (Live at Shibuya O-West 25 July 2006)
5. "SpiderSpins" (Live at Shibuya O-West 25 July 2006)
6. "Devil's in Me" (Live at Shibuya O-West 25 July 2006)
