= Swirlies =

American indie rock band

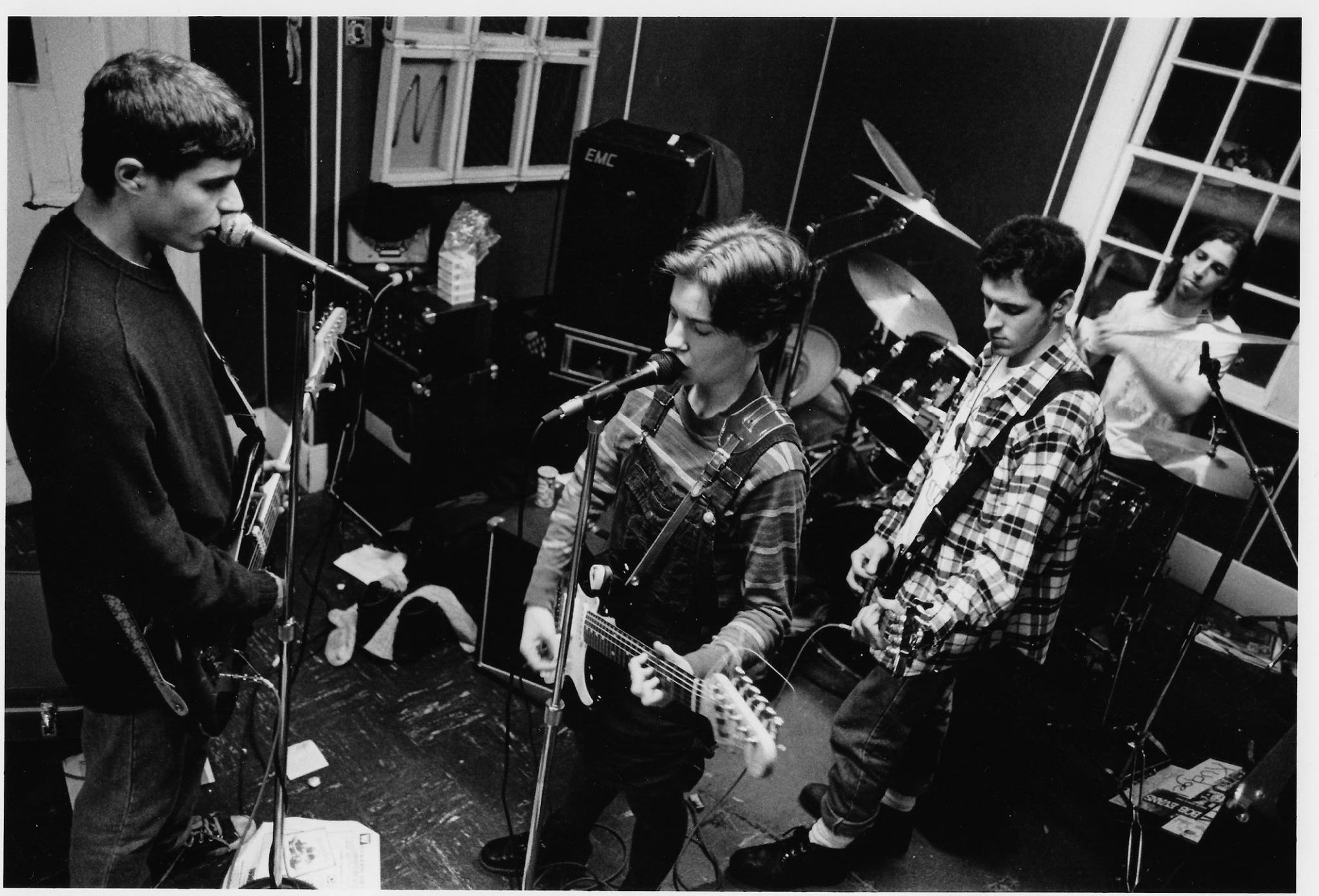
- Swirlies in their practice space, 1992

Background information
- Origin: Boston, Massachusetts, U.S.
- Genres: Indie rock; shoegaze; noise pop; slacker rock
- Years active: 1990–present
- Labels: Taang; Slumberland; Sneaky Flute Empire

Swirlies is an American indie rock band formed in Boston in 1990. Since their first records in the early 1990s, the band has released studio and home recordings that blend shoegaze and twee pop with electronica and lo-fi music.

Swirlies released five studio albums between 1993 and 2003. The band have since assembled to tour occasionally with a roster of musicians led by founding guitarist/songwriter Damon Tutunjian.

== History ==
=== 1990–1991: Formation and early releases ===
Guitarists Seana Carmody and Damon Tutunjian met in Spring 1990 through mutual friend Rusty Nails, a punk fanzine publisher who wanted to start a Go-Go's cover band. Formed in Cambridge, Massachusetts, Tutunjian, Carmody, Nails, and drummer Jason Fitzpatrick learned two songs before abandoning their original objective in favor of writing originals. Under the name Raspberry Bang, the group released one song on a 7-inch record compilation to benefit animal rights.

In November 1990, Tutunjian's high school friend Andy Bernick was enlisted to play bass and M.I.T. student Ben Drucker was recruited to play drums. The band began writing and recording songs characterized by shifting tempos, loud vibrato guitars played through numerous effects pedals, Tutunjian and Carmody's melodic vocal interplay, and occasional bursts of screaming and other noise. They completed their first 4-track demo in December 1990, and played their first show on January 25, 1991. Because of the band's practice of alternate guitar tunings, Bernick took to playing tapes or static from an old AM radio to fill time while Carmody and Tutunjian adjusted their guitars.

In 1991 Swirlies made some 8-track home recordings, which saw issue as the band's debut single "Didn't Understand" first self-released as a cassette and then on 7-inch vinyl by Slumberland Records. A split double-single with Boston noise rock band Kudgel followed, and the group entered the studio to record another single and compilation tracks for Boston's Pop Narcotic label.

=== 1992–1993: What To Do About Them and Blonder Tongue Audio Baton ===
In 1992 the band signed to Taang! Records and released the eight-song mini-album What To Do About Them culled from a mix of previously available and unreleased home and studio recordings. Musician/cartoonist Ron Regé, Jr. contributed artwork to the album's cover as well as lo-fi recordings that were woven into the record's sequence. The band also set to work recording their first LP, around which time shifts in Swirlies' personnel began to occur. Ben Drucker only drummed on a third of the new album's studio tracks, and for the remaining songs his parts were handed over to a pair of session drummers. In fall 1992, Andy Bernick departed to focus on his studies at the University of Rhode Island (where he also served as a late-night FM DJ on WRIU) and Damon's former roommate Morgan Andrews was brought in to fill in on bass guitar and assorted noises. It was this lineup that toured to support What To Do About Them and that appeared in the video for "Bell" from Blonder Tongue Audio Baton, which had already been completed but was not yet released. Named for an obscure piece of vintage musical equipment, Blonder Tongue Audio Baton made use of Mellotron, Moog, and other analog artifacts that the group had unearthed in the studio. During sequencing the band threw in numerous lo-fi compositions, soundbites, and rants, and collaged together an album jacket from arrays of found images and objects that matched the album's eclectic aesthetics. Hailed for melding "the high waters of shoegaze creativity and the mounting currents of indie rock", Blonder Tongue Audio Baton quickly rose to prominence in the American noise pop canon.

After the school year concluded, Bernick returned, and Swirlies enjoyed a brief period of performing as a quintet made up of two guitars, two bass guitars, and a drum kit until Andrews left in June 1993 to become a radio DJ. At this point Blonder Tongue Audio Baton was released, and the band embarked on their first nation-wide tour with the original line up of Bernick, Carmody, Drucker, and Tutunjian. Later that year, Swirlies released the Brokedick Car EP which contained remixes of songs from Blonder Tongue alongside a couple of outtakes. In Fall 1993, Ben Drucker was replaced by Anthony DeLuca on drums, and the band did a series of short tours on the East Coast college circuit. In January 1994, the band did their first tour of Europe, which included a session recorded for John Peel. Directly after the tour, Seana Carmody left Swirlies and formed Syrup USA.

=== 1994–1999: Sneaky Flutes and Salons ===
Christina Files joined Swirlies on guitar, synths, and vocals in early 1994, and that summer the band began work on their next album. After being branded both "shoegaze"' and "chimp rock" early in their career, the band was exploring new musical directions and invented a name for their ethos, emblazoning it in the title of their 1995 EP, Sneaky Flutes and Sneaky Flute Music. The seven-song mini-album was a forerunner to their full-length masterwork, 1996's They Spent Their Wild Youthful Days in the Glittering World of the Salons. The album added more synth-driven electronica and a few dance beats to their foundations in angular noise pop, drawing comparisons to Stereolab and their Krautrock forebears.

More member changes occurred during this time: In 1995, DeLuca left, and Gavin McCarthy manned the drum kit for two U.S. tours before moving on to work in his own group Karate. Swirlies briefly played as a trio before Adam Pierce stepped in to play drums. Files left Swirlies to play with Victory at Sea and was replaced in 1997 by guitarist Rob Laakso. In 1998, the group remixed songs from the Salons sessions for the album Strictly East Coast Sneaky Flute Music, which featured collaborations with producers Rich Costey, DJ Spooky, Soul Slinger, and Mice Parade, various friends of the band, and an abundance of field recordings as was tradition on earlier Swirlies releases.

=== 2000–2003: The Yes Girls and Cats of the Wild ===
Swirlies continued as a four piece under the Tutunjian-Laakso-Bernick-Pierce arrangement into the new millennium. Swirlies offshoot The Yes Girls (the core lineup but with Lavender Diamond's Ron Regé on drums) toured the U.S. with Timonium, and in Denmark as an opener for Mew on their Half the World is Watching Me tour. This endeavor culminated in the release of the home-made album Damon Andy Rob Ron: The Yes Girls, which was released on Sneaky Flute Empire/Pehr in 2000, as well as a limited edition live album on Sneaky Flute Empire.

The band began to settle into being an outfit with a cast of guest musicians revolving in and out of the group to accommodate the other members' academic, career, and family commitments: Seana Carmody, Vanessa Downing, and Damon's sister Kara Tutunjian often joined onstage for live vocals, Mike Walker and Tarquin Katis occasionally sat in for Bernick on bass, and Ken Bernard and Kevin Shea sometimes replaced Adam Pierce on drums. Deborah Warfield joined the band as vocalist circa 2000, also playing guitar and keyboards live.

Swirlies eventually released Cats of the Wild, Vol. 2 on Bubblecore Records in 2003, collecting new material alongside revamped studio versions of Yes Girls songs, plus outtakes from Swirlies' early 90s recordings.

=== Subsequent activity ===
The group, though sometimes sparse in regards to output, has never disbanded. They played a few shows in the northeastern U.S. in 2009 and 2011, toured the Eastern Seaboard and Midwest in 2013 with Kurt Vile, with Elliott Malvas on bass in lieu of Andy, and in 2015 Swirlies co-founder Seana Carmody rejoined the group for a two-week tour of the eastern U.S. and Canada to commemorate the band's 25th year of existence. In 2016, Joyful Noise Recordings released a new Swirlies song (Fantastic Trumpets Forever) on flexi disc, and Taang! Records reissued the Blonder Tongue Audio Baton LP on vinyl. In 2017 they headlined a tour of the West Coast in the U.S. In, 2018 they toured the South and the East Coast of the U.S. in support of the Philadelphia-based rock band Nothing. Post-COVID, the band headlined tours of the East Coast in 2023 and 2024, and Texas and the West Coast in 2024, including performances at the Slide Away, Levitation, and And Always Forever festivals. The band also released the first ever issue of their 2003 Cats of the Wild Forever LP on vinyl on Sneakflute Empire in Fall 2024.

== Other releases and projects ==
Since their earliest demo tape, each Swirlies appearance has been marked with "This is Swirlies number __" in order of its release. In addition to their "official" releases, Swirlies have produced a number of cassingles, CDs, and free downloadable albums on their own Sneaky Flute Empire label. Beginning in 2005 the band began to curate recordings of live performances and radio sessions in limited runs under the name "Swirlies' Magic Strop" (derived from a razor strop box that Andy saw at the Mercer Museum.) The first three of these were issued via their website as MP3-only albums, including a mock rock opera about Meg Zamula, a former writer for Pitchfork. In 2015, the band's 1994 Peel Sessions were issued on a 7-inch called Orca vs. Dragon, and in 2018 the band put out a 12-inch EP called Magic Strop Tonight compiling tracks from the Los Angeles radio show Part Time Punks and new studio songs from their "Fantastic Trumpets Forever" single.

A Swirlies tribute album, Sneaky Flute Moods: A Tribute to the Swirlies, was released online by Reverse Engine in April 2012.

Singer/guitarist Damon Tutunjian produced Mew's debut album and performed in some capacity on their first five albums. He also produced a number of tracks for The Wicked Farleys debut 7-inch and first LP. He played guitar in the original incarnation of Lansing-Dreiden in the late 1990s and in the Danish band Ghost Society in 2010. In 2013, he joined Swedish band I Am Super Ape on bass guitar and synths and produced their single "Monki", featuring Mark Lanegan on vocals. He recently produced the debut album for the Swedish multi-instrumentalist Majken.

Since 2000, former bassist Andy Bernick has operated a label and website called Richmond County Archives, featuring themed compilations, music, and spoken word performances. The site also served as Swirlies' official web presence.

== Members ==
Original lineup (1990-1993)

- Damon Tutunjian – guitar and vocals
- Seana Carmody – guitar and vocals
- Andy Bernick – bass guitar and radio
- Ben Drucker – drums

Current members

- Damon Tutunjian
- Deborah Warfield
- Elliott Malvas
- Kevin Shea

Former members

- Rob Laakso (1997-2023)
- Andy Bernick (retired)
- Adam Pierce
- Wesley Bunch
- Viktor Hober
- Anna Bergvall
- Ben Drucker
- Seana Carmody
- Mike Walker
- Morgan Andrews
- Doro Tachler
- Ron Regé Jr.
- Anthony DeLuca
- Baby Tonts
- Christina Files
- Gavin McCarthy
- Ken Bernard
- Kara Tutunjian
- Vanessa Downing
- Junko Hemmi
- Tarquin Katis
- Kurt Vile
- Avery Matthews
- Matt Sheppeck
- Matthew Seabass

Tutunjian is the sole Swirlie to play with the group for its entire duration while other members have come and gone, sometimes coming back again.

Partial timeline

== Selected discography ==
=== Albums ===
- Blonder Tongue Audio Baton LP/CD/cassette (Taang! 1993)
- They Spent Their Wild Youthful Days in the Glittering World of the Salons (Taang! 1996)
- Strictly East Coast Sneaky Flute Music CD (Taang! 1998)
- Damon, Andy, Rob, Ron: The Yes Girls (Pehr/Sneaky Flute Empire 2000)
- Cats of The Wild Volume 2 CD/MP3 (Bubblecore Records 2003)

=== EPs ===
- What To Do About Them mini-LP/CD/cassette (Taang! 1992)
- Brokedick Car 12-inch EP/CD/cassette (Taang! 1994)
- Sneaky Flutes and Sneaky Flute Music mini-LP/CD (Taang! 1996)
- Magic Strop Tonight 12" (Sneaky Flute Empire, 2018)

=== Singles ===
- Didn't Understand 7-inch release (Slumberland Records, 1992)
- Error 7-inch (Pop Narcotic, 1992)
- Brokedick Car 7-inch version (Taang! 1993)
- Swirlies' Magic Strop: Orca vs. Dragon 7-inch (Richmond County Archives/Sneaky Flute Empire, 2015)
- Fantastic Trumpets Forever flexi disc (Joyful Noise Recordings, 2016)

=== Split releases ===
- A Kinder Gentler Genocide (Swirlies appeared under the name Raspberry Bang) 7-inch compilation (Wasted Effort, 1990)
- Free Tape (cassette with Dropdead, Fast Forward, 1991)
- Red Fish Dreams 2×7" split with Kudgel (Cinderblock/Villa Villa Kula, 1992)
- Working Holiday Series: November split 7-inch with Pitchblende (Simple Machines, 1993)
- Vents of the Ocean Floor split 7-inch with Iris (Bubblecore Records, 1996)

=== Online releases ===
- Swirlies' Magic Strop: At the Salon of WBCN 12×MP3 (Sneaky Flute Empire, 2005)
- Swirlies' Magic Strop: Winsome Zamula's Hammer of Contumely 8×MP3 (Sneaky Flute Empire, 2005)
- Swirlies' Magic Strop: Gavin's March To The Sea 16×MP3 (Sneaky Flute Empire, 2009)

=== Compilations ===
- Strictly East Coast Sneaky Flute Music/They Spent Their Wild Youthful Days in the Glittering World of the Salons 2×LP (Taang! 1998)
- Swirlies Magic Drive: Välkommen Till Ponyklubben mixed format flash drive (Sneaky Flute Empire, 2013)

=== Music videos ===
- "Bell" (1992)

== Appearances in other media ==
Swirlies are mentioned in the 2016 novel, Our Noise by Jeff Gomez, appearing in a fictitious record review written by the book's protagonist.

In 2018 a Swirlies poster made an appearance in the Hulu TV series Castle Rock based on short stories by Stephen King and set in the 1990s.

== See also ==
- Fat Day, authors of Cats of the Wild [Vol 1]
- Chimp rock, term that predated "sneakyflute music"
- Syrup USA, Seana Carmody's post-Swirlies band

== Sources ==
- Biography on VH1
