= Yılmaz Gruda =

Turkish actor and poet (1930–2023)

- Born: Ahmet Yılmaz Gruda; 14 July 1930; Istanbul, Turkey
- Died: 25 July 2023 (aged 93); Istanbul, Turkey
- Occupations: Actor, poet, playwright, translator
- Years active: 1933–2023
- Spouses: Tolga Tiğin (m. 1957; div. 1963) Ayşen Gruda (m. 1965; div. 1976) Türkan Gruda (m. 1985; died 2014)
- Children: 2

Yılmaz Gruda (14 July 1930 – 25 July 2023) was a Turkish actor, poet, playwright, and translator.

== Life and career ==
A graduate of Ankara Commerce High School, Gruda worked as a government officer and became famous in 1950s when his poems were published in various journals. In 1956, he started acting by joining Cep Theatre, and continued his career at Küçük Theatre, a branch of the Ankara State Theatre. He then worked at the Ankara Meydan Stage and Nisa Serezli acting community. He briefly returned to his job in the government and worked as an engineer. He then managed the Muammer Karaca theatre. Together with Attilâ İlhan, he started the period of blue movement in Turkish poetry. Elements of traditional Turkish theatre and Anton Chekhov's influence is clearly seen in Gruda's works, who also wrote and translated theater plays. Gruda has published his poems and plays in a series of books. He continued to appear in movies and TV series.

Gruda, who had been experiencing health problems for a while, died on 25 July 2023, at the age of 93. On July 27, 2023, he was interred at Karacaahmet Cemetery in Istanbul.

== Awards ==
- Cumhuriyet Yunus Nadi Award, 2003, Marathon "Bir Uzun Koşu"
- Behçet Aysan Poetry Award, 1999, Çerçi Zeus
- 53rd Antalya Film Festival, Honorary Award, 2016

== Books ==
- Bir Başka O - Oratoryo, Kaynak Publication, February 2007, ISBN 978-975-343-486-7
- Manzum Nasreddin Hoca Fıkraları, Kaynak Publication, June 2006, ISBN 978-975-343-457-7
- Marathon "Bir Uzun Koşu", Bilgi Publishing House, June 2002, ISBN 978-975-494-994-0
- Çerçi Zeus - Bir Çağdaş Mitoloji Denemesi, Öteki Publishing House, 1997, ISBN 975-8012-58-4
- Çarmıhtaki Yeni Mehmet, Öteki Publishing House, 1997, ISBN 975-8012-56-8
- Camdaki Düşman, Öteki Publishing House, 1996,
- Bir Çürümüş Kent Belgeseli, Serander Publication, 2002, ISBN 975-97589-2-X
- Tek Perdelik Dokuz Oyun, Anton Çehov, Bilgi Publishing House, 1994, ISBN 975-494-437-7
- Şu Bizim Tiyatromuz, 1976
- Kül Altındaki Kor, Anton Çehov, 1993

== Filmography ==
- 1935: Aysel Bataklı Damın Kızı
- 1938: Aynaroz Kadısı
- 1940: Yılmaz Ali
- 1942: Sürtük
- 1944: Hasret
- 1946: Senede Bir Gün
- 1948: Damga
- 1950: Çete
- 1951: Evli Mı Bekar Mı ?
- 1952: Edi Ile Büdü Tiyatrocu
- 1953: Drakula Istanbul'da
- 1954: Sahildeki Kadın
- 1955: Günahkar Baba
- 1956: Büyük Sır
- 1957: Bir Avuç Toprak
- 1958: Daha Çekecek miyim
- 1958: Dokuz Dağın Efesi - ( Çakici Geliyor )
- 1958: İstanbul Macerası
- 1959: Düşman Yolları Kesti
- 1959: Ölürüm de Ayrılamam
- 1960: Dolandırıcılar Şahı
- 1960: Gecelerin Ötesi
- 1960: Rüzgâr Zehra / Sünger Avcıları
- 1961: İstanbul'da Aşk Başkadır
- 1961: Kader Yolcusu
- 1961: Suçlu Aşıklar
- 1962: Bir Gecelik Gelin
- 1962: Fatoş'un Bebekleri
- 1963: Barut Fıçısı
- 1964: Affetmeyen Kadın
- 1964: Döner Ayna
- 1965: Cennet Fedaileri
- 1965: Karaoğlan - Altay'dan Gelen Yiğit
- 1966: Karaoğlan Baybora'nın Oğlu
- 1966: Karaoğlan Camoka'nın Intikamı - ( Karaoğlan Camoka's Revenge )
- 1966: Ben Bir Kanun Kaçağıyım
- 1966: Kanun Benim
- 1966: Karakolda Ayna Var
- 1966: Yaşamak Haram Oldu
- 1967: Demir Yumruklu Üçler
- 1967: Kızıl Tehlike
- 1967: Yalan Bazen Tatlıdır
- 1968: Yara
- 1969: Tarkan
- 1970: Ağlayan Melek
- 1970: Bomba Ahmet
- 1970: Herkesin Sevgilisi
- 1970: İç Güveysi
- 1970: Ölünceye Kadar
- 1971: Ayıbettin Şemsettin
- 1971: Bir Kadın Kayboldu
- 1971: Sezercik Yavrum Benim
- 1972: Hazreti Yusuf
- 1972: Suya Düşen Hayal
- 1972: Tophaneli Murat
- 1972: Zulüm
- 1973: Arap Abdo / İstanbul Kabadayıları
- 1973: Asiye Nasıl Kurtulur?
- 1973: Bebek Yüzlü
- 1973: Bitirimler Sosyetede
- 1973: Gazi Kadın
- 1973: Gülerken Ağlayanlar
- 1973: Sevda Yolu
- 1973: Yeryüzünde Bir Melek
- 1973: Cano
- 1974: Fedai
- 1974: Kartal Yuvası
- 1975: Diyet
- 1975: Köçek
- 1975: Vur Tatlım
- 1976: Arabacının Aşkı
- 1976: Aşk Dediğin Laf Değildir
- 1976: Babanın Suçu
- 1976: Gel Barışalım
- 1976: Güngörmüşler
- 1976: Kana Kan
- 1976: Kuklalar
- 1976: Şoför
- 1976: Su Perisi Elması
- 1976: Tek Başına
- 1977: Meryem ve Oğulları
- 1984: Şabaniye
- 1988: A Ay
- 1990: Kuruntu Ailesi
- 1992: Yağmur Beklerken
- 1994: Aylaklar - Altuğ Savaşal
- 1994: Bay Kamber
- 1996: Gözlerinde Son Gece
- 2004: Yabancı Damat
- 2005: Empty
- 2007: Kavak Yelleri
- 2008: Şeytanın Pabucu
- 2009: Aile Saadeti
- 2009: Aşk Geliyorum Demez
- 2009: Bez Bebek
- 2010: Çakıl Taşları
- 2011: Aşk Tesadüfleri Sever
- 2011: Bitmeyen Şarkı
- 2011: Celal Tan ve Ailesinin Aşırı Acıklı Hikayesi
- 2012: Böyle Bitmesin
- 2012: İşler Güçler
- 2012: Suskunlar
- 2013: Aşk Ağlatır
- 2013: Fatih
- 2013: Galip Derviş
- 2013: Vicdan
- 2014: Gülcemal
- 2014: Kod Adı: K.O.Z.
- 2014: Olur Olur! Bal Gibi Olur
- 2014: Sürgün İnek
- 2014: Ulan İstanbul
- 2015: Adana İşi
- 2015: Gönül İşleri
- 2015: Mutlu Ol Yeter
- 2016: Biz Bir Dolaşalım
- 2016: Roza of Smyrna / İsmail ve Roza
- 2017: Görevimiz Tatil
- 2017: Ver Kaç
- 2017: Yıldızlar Şahidim
- 2018: Ailecek Şaşkınız
- 2018: Batlır
- 2018: Göktaşı
- 2018: Şahsiyet
- 2018: Sorma Neden
- 2019: Bir Aile Hikayesi
- 2019: Hercai
- 2020: Babam Çok Değişti
- 2020: Menajerimi Ara
- 2021: Çukur
- 2022: Rüzgargülü
- 2022: Yanlış Anlama 2
- 2022: Mahalleden Arkadaşlar
- 2023: Üç Günlük Dünya
- 2023: Kuzenler Firarda 2
- 2023: Prens
