= ILY (Yokubō) =

Single by Olivia Lufkin

Single by Olivia Lufkin

from the album Synchronicity
- Released: February 3, 1999
- Genre: Pop rock
- Label: Avex Trax
- Songwriter(s): T2ya

Olivia Lufkin singles chronology
| "Together Now" (1998) | "ILY (Yokubō)" (1999) | "Re-act" (1999) |

"ILY (Yokubō)" (I.L.Y.～欲望～, "I Love You (Desire)") is Olivia's first solo single released on February 3, 1999, under the label Avex Trax. The song was written by T2ya. It peaked at 32nd place on the Oricon weekly singles chart and charted for four weeks. The single was used as an ending theme song in the TV show G Paradise, as well as in a commercial for Morinaga & Company.

Her debut single marks a shift away from the upbeat dance-pop oriented music from her days in D&D to a more alternative rock sound.

The music video was shot on January 17, 1999, at a studio in Japan.

== Track listing ==
1. "I.L.Y. (Yokubō)" (I.L.Y.～欲望～)
2. "Hanabira" (花弁)
3. "I.L.Y. (Yokubō) (Instrumental)"
4. "Hanabira (Instrumental)"
