= What To Do About Them =

What to Do About Them

EP by Swirlies
- Released: 1992
- Recorded: 1991–1992
- Studio: Fort Apache Studios, Q Division Studios, MIT
- Genre: Noise pop; indie rock; shoegaze; lo-fi; dream pop
- Length: 22:28
- Label: Taang!
- Producer: Swirlies

Swirlies chronology
What to Do About Them (1992)	Blonder Tongue Audio Baton (1993)

What to Do About Them is a 1992 EP by Boston indie rock band Swirlies. It was Swirlies' first release for Taang! Records and documents the band's early material recorded in 1991 and 1992. The album is mostly made up of songs selected from their three previous 7" records, as well as previously unreleased material.

== Content ==
Swirlies recorded the songs on What to Do About Them in multiple sessions on three different recording formats: Three songs were taken from the group's "Didn't Understand" single, recorded on 8-track reel-to-reel in guitarist Damon Tutunjian's Mission Hill apartment with drum parts recorded at M.I.T. by WMBR DJ John McGee. Two more songs were recorded at Fort Apache Studios by sound engineer Tim O'Heir and mixed at Q Division Studios by Rich Costey, with whom the band would continue to work for over a decade. The album's other songs were created on a 4-track cassette recorder by Tutunjian at home.

The band sequenced the songs on What To Do About Them in a way that created an arc in fidelity—from studio to 8-track to 4-track to 8-track to studio, and so on—and linked songs with field recordings and non-sequiturial soundbites as transitions. The song "Tall Ships" opens the record by sampling a pack of feral dogs howling. "Her Life of Artistic Freedom" is a home recording of solo guitar and voice set to the beat of a skipping record. On vinyl releases, the song played out into a locked groove that ended the side of the record. The lo-fi track "Cousteau" is framed by bits of dialogue and magnetic tape noises, ending in a warbled demo recording of the band's song "Jeremy Parker," a studio version of which would appear on the next Swirlies release, Blonder Tongue Audio Baton.

== Tunings ==
The album shows the band's increasing penchant for alternate guitar tunings, with the earlier material in Swirlies' baseline half-step below standard tuning of D#/G#/C#/F#/A#/D# on both guitars. Tutunjian retunes his guitar on the home-recorded "Cousteau" to D#/F#/C#/F/G#/D#, and to D#/F#/C#/F#/A#/A# to accompany Carmody's voice on "Chris R."

== Artwork ==
The album's front cover and inner sleeve drawings are by cartoonist Ron Regé Jr., who also contributed vocals and noises to the record's final track. The back cover features a close-up photograph of an ostrich, a bird that would appear as Swirlies' mascot on further record sleeves, T-shirts, and other artwork affiliated with the band.

== Other versions ==
Swirlies began playing a full band version of "Her Life of Artistic Freedom" and recorded it as part of a session for the John Peel Show. The song saw release on the band's 2015 single "Orca vs. Dragon."

== Track listing ==
1. "Tall Ships" - 4:33
2. "Sarah Sitting"^{a} - 2:09
3. "Her Life of Artistic Freedom"^{b} - 1:47
4. "Didn't Understand"^{a} - 3:29
5. "Upstairs"^{c} - 4:17
6. "Chris R."^{a} - 2:35
7. "Cousteau" - 3:06
8. "Do You Have Any Idea What It's About?" - 0:33

^{a} Tracks 2, 4, and 6 previously appeared on Swirlies' "Didn't Understand" single on Slumberland Records.

^{b} Track 3 previously appeared on the Red Fish Dreams split double single with the band Kudgel.

^{c} Track 5 previously appeared on the "Error" single on Pop Narcotic Records.

All other tracks were previously unreleased.

== Personnel ==
- Damon Tutunjian – guitar, vocals
- Seana Carmody – guitar, vocals
- Andy Bernick – bass guitar
- Ben Drucker – drums
- Ron Regé, Jr. – artwork, final blurt on track 8
- John McGee — recording engineer on tracks 2, 4 and 6
- Tim O'Heir – recording on tracks 1 and 5
- Rich Costey – mixing on tracks 1 and 5

All other recording, mixing and editing done at home by Swirles.

== Singles ==
- "Didn't Understand" b/w "Sarah Sitting" and "Chris R." were released as a cassingle by the band, and then on 7" vinyl by Slumberland Records in four different editions (DRYL #015).
- "Upstairs" was the B-side to the Error 7" released by the Boston label Pop Narcotic (NARC 001).
- "Her Life Of Artistic Freedom" appeared on the Red Fish Dreams double 7" split release with Boston band Kudgel on their guitarist's Cinderblock Records label (CBR-3)
- A full band version of "Her Life Of Artistic Freedom" was recorded for the BBC's John Peel Show and released on the Orca vs. Dragon single by the band in 2015.
