= Murmurs (album) =

Studio album by Caroline
- Released: March 7, 2006
- Recorded: Iyasinsu Studio
- Genre: Electronic, pop, ambient
- Label: Temporary Residence

Caroline chronology
"Where's My Love?"; CD single (2005)	Murmurs (2006)

Professional ratings
Review scores
Source	Rating
Allmusic	link
Pitchfork Media	(7.8/10) 3/16/2006

Murmurs is the first full-length album released by Caroline. It was released on Temporary Residence Limited.

"Sunrise", the second single taken from Murmurs, was released on October 10, 2006. The single features the title track, as well as two remixes: a remix of Sunrise by Logreybeam, and a remix of Everylittlething by DJ Poignant. The single cover artwork was made by Caroline's sister Olivia.

== Track listing ==
1. Bicycle – 3:46
2. Pink & Black – 4:41
3. Sunrise – 4:02
4. Where's My Love? – 4:22
5. Everylittlething – 3:19
6. All I Need – 3:20
7. Drove Me to the Wall – 3:50
8. I'll Leave My Heart Behind – 4:22
9. Winter – 4:48

== Personnel ==
- Caroline (vocals, lyrics, arrangement, producer)
- Daniel Rosenboom (trumpet)
- Johnny C (clay udu drums, shakers, spirit chime, finger cymbals, sleigh bells, cabasa, caxixi on "Bicycle")
- Kai Kurosawa (producer, arrangement, mixer, programmer on "Bicycle")
- Andreas Bjorck (producer, arrangement, programming, mixer on "Pink & Black", "Sunrise", "Winter", "Where's My Love"; string arrangements on "Winter")
- Jeffrey Lufkin (producer, programmer on "Everylittlething")
- Tarik Monsanto (mixer on "Everylittlething")
- Jason Greenberg (producer, programmer, arrangement, mixer on "All I Need" and "Drove Me To The Wall")
- Tomoji Sogawa (producer, programmer, arrangement on "I'll Leave My Heart Behind")
- Makoto Totani (guitar on "I'll Leave My Heart Behind")
- Masahiko Sato (recording engineer on "I'l Leave My Heart Behind")
- Wataru_Pop (mix)

== Reviews ==
Reviews compared soloist Caroline to Icelandic singer Bjork, as well as her vocal range (from sultry whisper to pop diva). Other aspects of the album noted were the various instrumentation in the individual songs.
