= They Spent Their Wild Youthful Days in the Glittering World of the Salons =

Studio album by Swirlies
- Released: April 1996
- Recorded: August 1994 – August 1995
- Studio: Big House Studios; Unique Studios; Water Music; Q Division Studios; Looking Glass Studios; Studio 45; Sound Techniques; at home
- Genre: Shoegaze
- Length: 47:24
- Label: Taang!
- Producer: Swirlies & Rich Costey

Swirlies chronology
Blonder Tongue Audio Baton (1993)	They Spent Their Wild Youthful Days in the Glittering World of the Salons (1996)	Strictly East Coast Sneaky Flute Music (1998)

Professional ratings
Review scores
Source	Rating
AllMusic	3.5/5 stars

They Spent Their Wild Youthful Days in the Glittering World of the Salons is the second full-length album by Boston indie rock band Swirlies. Released in April 1996, three years after their previous LP, this was the group's first major recording effort after a change in half of Swirlies' lineup. Working again with engineer and co-producer Rich Costey, the band developed a wider scope of sound than the shoegaze and lo-fi pop which characterized their earlier releases, as Salons makes heavier use of synthesizers, dance beats, and other electronic sounds, drawing comparisons to groups like Stereolab and their Krautrock forebears. In 2014 music writer Andrew Earles placed the record on his list of 500 essential American underground rock albums.

== Background ==
After signing to Taang! Records and touring to support their initial releases, Swirlies underwent several line up changes, resulting in the departure of original guitarist/vocalist Seana Carmody and drummer Ben Drucker, who were replaced by Christina Files and Anthony DeLuca respectively. The new line up spent the Spring of 1994 writing new material and then embarked on a short East Coast tour in July giving them a chance to streamline the songs. Recording sessions for their second LP were initiated in August 1994 at various studios in NYC and Hoboken (Big House, Water Music, etc.) with sound engineer Rich Costey who had recently moved from Boston to New York to head the studio run by Philip Glass.

Basics for the songs were recorded quickly, but multiple budget-related and booking issues plagued the band and consequently overdubs and vocals took an additional year to complete, with the band jumping between various studios in Boston (Room 9, Q Division) and Hartford (Studio 45) as time and finances permitted.

In December 1995 with the album's songs recorded but not yet fully mixed or sequenced, Swirlies released versions of the songs "San Cristobal de las Casas" and "You Can't Be Told It, You Must Behold it" on the EP Sneaky Flutes and Sneaky Flute Music amidst a cluster of lo-fi tracks and soundbites. Mixing for the LP was initially attempted over a number of sessions at Sound Techniques in the Fenway, but the band was not satisfied with the mixes and remixed over half the record at Looking Glass in NYC, typically spending a day or more per song.

The full album came out in April 1996, and was initially released in CD format only. The songs were much more reliant on instrument-swapping than those on their previous releases, as Files traded duties with bass player Andy Bernick and all but drummer DeLuca attended keyboards, samplers, vocoders, drum machines, and other electronic equipment. The band had spent considerably more time in the studio sequencing Salons than they had their previous records, resulting in seamless transitions between varied styles of music, giving it the feel of a well-crafted mixtape. Bandleader Damon Tutunjian later called the record the band's "longest labor of love."

== Songs ==
Nine of the album's 14 tracks have sung lyrics, while a few others offer instrumental peeks at the band jamming along to drum machine beats or organ drones. "San Cristobal de las Casas", named after the town of the same name in the southern Mexican state of Chiapas, is Tutunjian's reflection on the then-recent Zapatista uprising and subsequent government and paramilitary backlash. On "Two Girls Kissing", Files presents a danceable anecdote of Cantabrigian sexuality. The album's lead track, "In Harmony New Found Freedom" completes Swirlies' "Freedom Trilogy", being the band's third song title to end with the word after 1992's "Her Life of Artistic Freedom" and 1993's "His Life of Academic Freedom".

As on previous releases, Swirlies employed bits of field recording and found tape to thread their songs together. The album fanfares 18 seconds of "French Radio" captured over the airwaves while the band was in England recording a session for The John Peel Show. "Do Any of You Know Anything About Love?" is a snippet of relationship advice taken from a CB radio conversation between an anonymous trucker and a recurring voice that appears on many Swirlies records. The album's final track samples a monologue from an English-speaking francophone cat owner and the sounds made by said cat.

== Releases ==
They Spent Their Wild Youthful Days in the Glittering World of the Salons was released on CD as Taang! #101/Swirlies #10. Due to the album's extended production time, Taang! issued it a lower catalog number than the previously released CD EP, Sneaky Flutes and Sneaky Flute Music (Taang! #111/Swirlies #9), indicating the initial delay in its release.

In 1998 Taang! re-packaged Salons with the band's next album, Strictly East Coast Sneaky Flute Music (Taang! #132/Swirlies #15) as a gatefold double LP.

== Track listing ==
1. "French Radio" – 0:18
2. "In Harmony New Found Freedom" – 5:47
3. "No Identifier" – 1:44
4. "Sounds of Sebring" – 4:21
5. "San Cristobal De Las Casas" – 4:22
6. "You Can't Be Told It, You Must Behold It" – 2:22
7. "Pony" – 3:15
8. "Do Any of You Know Anything About Love?" – 0:34
9. "Two Girls Kissing" – 6:03
10. "Sterling Moss" – 3:44
11. "Boys, Protect Yourselves from Aliens" – 0:57
12. "Sunn" – 5:39
13. "The Vehicle Is Invisible" – 5:12
14. "French Outro" – 2:41

For the 1998 vinyl release, tracks 1–8 of Salons comprised side C and the rest side D of the double LP with the subsequent Strictly East Coast Sneaky Flute Music album on sides A and B.

== Sneaky Flutes and Sneaky Flute Music EP ==
Released in December 1995 on CD and !@" EP, the EP Sneaky Flutes and Sneaky Flute Music featured two songs that would appear on the Salons album sandwiched between several lo-fi home recordings and soundbites.

=== Track listing for Sneaky Flutes and Sneaky Flute Music ===
1. "Intro" – 0:13
2. "San Cristobal de las Casas" – 4:06
3. "San Cristobal Outro" – 0:24
4. "Disobedience (James Morrison)" – 1:58
5. "You Can't Be Told It, You Must Behold It" – 2:31
6. "Wet Naps" – 2:31
7. "Tapes for the Blind (for Morgan)" – 0:48

== Personnel ==
- Damon Tutunjian – guitar, vocals, e-bow guitar, vocoder, keyboards, drum machine, samples
- Andy Bernick – bass, e-bow guitar, keyboards, claptrap
- Anthony DeLuca – drums
- Christina Files – guitar, vocals, bass, keyboards, samples, artwork
- Ron Regé, Jr. – artwork
- Rich Costey – production
- Swirlies – production
