= Internal Bleeding Strawberry =

EP by Olivia
- Released: February 21, 2003
- Recorded: 2003
- Genre: Rock/Alternative
- Length: 26:42
- Language: Japanese/English
- Label: avex trax

Olivia mini-album chronology
Internal Bleeding Strawberry (2003)	Merry&Hell Go Round (2003)

Internal Bleeding Strawberry is Olivia's first mini-album, released on February 21, 2003 and re-released by Tower Records Japan on December 12, 2003.

== Track listing ==
1. "Sea Me"
2. "Solarhalfbreed"
3. "Into the stars"
4. "Dress Me Up"
5. "Grapefruit Tea"
6. "Color of Your Spoon"
7. "Internal Bleeding Strawberry"
