= The Return of the Chlorophyll Bunny =

EP by Olivia
- Released: December 3, 2003
- Recorded: 2003
- Genre: Rock/Alternative
- Length: 20:23
- Language: Japanese/English
- Label: Cutting Edge

Olivia mini-album chronology
Comatose Bunny Butcher (2003)	The Return of the Chlorophyll Bunny (2003)	The Cloudy Dreamer (2007)

The Return of the Chlorophyll Bunny is the fourth mini-album by Olivia Lufkin, released on December 3, 2003 under the labels Avex Trax and Tower Records Japan.

== Track listing ==
1. "Dreamcamp"
2. "Skip to a Little 'Number'"
3. "Purple Box"
4. "Under Your Waves"
5. "Space Halo"
