= Sailing Free =

Single by Olivia Lufkin
- Released: April 15, 2009
- Genre: Pop rock
- Length: 15:14
- Label: Cutting Edge

Olivia Lufkin singles chronology
"Wish/Starless Night" (2006)	"Sailing Free" (2009)

"Sailing Free" is the eleventh single by Olivia Lufkin, a singer of American and Japanese descent, released on April 15, 2009. It is her first single in more than two years, with her previous single being released in late 2006. "Sailing Free" is a collaboration single with Inoran, guitarist of Luna Sea and the theme song to a new game exclusive to the PSP of the video game saga Sengoku Basara (or in English, Devil Kings), titled Sengoku Basara Battle Heroes.

The single debuted at #25 with first week sales totaling 2,418. Total sales so far for the single is 3,323.

== Track listing ==
=== CD Track List ===
1. "Sailing Free"
2. "Love Love Love"
3. "Undress"
4. "Sailing Free"(Karaoke version)
5. "Undress"(Karaoke Version)
