= Dekinai =

2000 single by Olivia Lufkin

""Dekinai""

Single by Olivia

from the album Synchronicity
- Released: July 26, 2000
- Genre: Pop rock
- Label: Avex Trax

Olivia singles chronology
"Dress Me Up" (2000)	""Dekinai"" (2000)	"Color of Your Spoon" (2000)

"Dekinai" ("Japanese: できない"; "English: I Can't") is Japanese singer-songwriter Olivia Lufkin's 5th solo single released on July 26, 2000. There were two promotional versions of this single released: a cd version and a vinyl version. The vinyl record version contains one extra remix of "Pass me the sugar" in place of "Escape the Flames". The song features Kochi Korenaga and Luna Sea drummer Shinya Yamada.

The music video and single cover were shot together in mid-June 2000 in Tokyo, by the same director.

== Track listing ==
=== Compact Disc ===
1. "Dekinai"
2. "Escape the Flames"
3. "Slow-mo"
4. "Dekinai" (Down to the Floor Mix)
5. "Pass me the sugar" (Heat in the Beat Mix)
6. "Dekinai"(instrumental version)

=== 12" ===
A-side

1. "Dekinai" (Down to Floor Mix)
2. "Dekinai"

B-side

3. "Pass me the sugar" (afterours mix)
4. "Pass me the sugar" (Heat in Beat Mix)
5. "Slow-mo"
