= Mice Parade (album) =

Studio album by Mice Parade
- Released: May 8, 2007
- Genre: Indie rock, shoegaze, post-rock
- Length: 35:16
- Label: FatCat Records

Mice Parade chronology
Bem-Vinda Vontade (2005)	Mice Parade (2007)	What It Means to Be Left-Handed (2010)

Mice Parade is the seventh studio album by Mice Parade. It was released on May 8, 2007, by FatCat Records.

== Critical reception ==
Professional ratings
Aggregate scores
Source	Rating
Metacritic	69/100
Review scores
Source	Rating
AllMusic	4/5 stars
Pitchfork	6.3/10
PopMatters	6/10
Stylus Magazine	C+
Tiny Mix Tapes	3.5/5 marks

On Metacritic, the album received a weighted average score of 69% based on 8 reviews, indicating "generally favorable reviews".

John Bush of AllMusic gave the album 4 stars out of 5, saying, "The twin drum kits bash and rattle in the background, but leave plenty of space to be occupied by vibraphone, electric and acoustic guitars, and cleverly arranged harmonies." Marc Hogan of Pitchfork gave the album a 6.3 out of 10, calling it "[Mice Parade's] most traditionally song-oriented [work]." Matthew Fiander of PopMatters said, "while it is a very good sounding record, this album doesn't quite hold together from song to song."

Joshua Pressman of LAist placed it at number 84 on the "Top 100 Albums of 2007" list.

== Track listing ==
No.	Title	Length
1.	"Sneaky Red"	4:18
2.	"Tales of Las Negras"	5:23
3.	"The Last Ten Homes"	2:37
4.	"Snow"	2:33
5.	"Double Dolphins on the Nickel"	5:24
6.	"Satchelaise"	4:29
7.	"Swing"	3:01
8.	"Circle None"	2:25
9.	"The Nights After Fiction"	5:19
