= Comatose Bunny Butcher =

EP by Olivia
- Released: September 12, 2003
- Recorded: 2003
- Genre: Rock/Alternative
- Length: 21:24
- Label: Tower Records

Olivia chronology
Merry&Hell Go Round (2003)	Comatose Bunny Butcher (2003)	The Return of the Chlorophyll Bunny (2003)

Comatose Bunny Butcher is the third mini-album by Olivia Lufkin, released on September 12, 2003 under the labels Avex Trax and Tower Records Japan on December 12, 2003.

== Track listing ==
1. "Celestial Delinquent"
2. "026unconscious333"
3. "57StoЯM03"
4. "Devil's in Me"
5. "Bliss Forest"
