= TK 1998: Latest Works =

TK1998 LATEST WORKS

EP by Tetsuya Komuro
- Released: November 26, 1998
- Genre: Pop / Electronica
- Label: SMEJ

TK 1998 Latest Works was a mini-album of the Japanese composer/producer Tetsuya Komuro. He composed and arranged the songs, meanwhile Marc Panther wrote the lyrics and sang in the songs. OLIVIA was the backs up vocalist in the songs "Welcome to the Museum", "Dreams" and "Empty lies". Despite Tetsuya Komuro being under Avex, the mini-album was released under SMEJ.

== Track listing ==
1. Welcome to the Museum
2. Transformation
3. Dreams
4. 8
5. Empty Lies
