= Trinka Trinka =

EP by Olivia
- Released: September 17, 2008
- Genre: Rock, Alternative
- Language: Japanese, English
- Label: Cutting Edge

Olivia mini-album chronology
The Cloudy Dreamer (2007)	Trinka Trinka (2008)

CD+DVD Cover
- CD+DVD version of "Trinka Trinka"

"Trinka Trinka" is Olivia's sixth mini-album. It was released on September 17, 2008. Unlike her last mini-album, there are no preceding singles.

Two versions of the album are planned to be released, a CD only version and a limited CD+DVD version. The CD+DVD version will include an accompanying music clip for "Rain" while the CD only version comes with an "Olivia Art & Photo Book" (while supplies last).

Aside from "Rain", the album will consist of all new material, however, it will include the much anticipated song "Real Love" which was showcased during her previous concert in Paris, France at La Locomotive, but renamed to "Your Smile". "Rain" was featured as the second ending theme song for K-tai Investigator 7, a 2008 Japanese television drama directed by Takashi Miike.

== Track listings ==
CD Track listing

1. "Trinka Trinka"
2. "Rain"
3. "Because"
4. "Collecting Sparkles"
5. "Miss You"
6. "Your Smile"

DVD Track listing

1. "Rain Music clip"
