= Merry & Hell Go Round =

Merry&Hell Go Round

EP by Olivia
- Released: June 27, 2003
- Recorded: 2003
- Genre: Rock/Alternative
- Length: 21:02
- Language: Japanese/English
- Label: Tower Records

Olivia mini-album chronology
Internal Bleeding Strawberry (2003)	Merry&Hell Go Round (2003)	Comatose Bunny Butcher (2003)

Merry&Hell Go Round is the second mini-album by Olivia Lufkin, released on June 27, 2003 under the labels Avex Trax Tower Records Japan.

== Track listing ==
1. "SpiderSpins"
2. "Denial"
3. "Blind Unicorn"
4. "Cupid"
5. "Sugarbloodsuckers"
