= Re-act =

Single by Olivia

from the album Synchronicity
- Released: May 12, 1999
- Genre: Pop rock
- Label: Avex Trax
- Songwriter(s): T2ya

Olivia singles chronology
"I.L.Y. (Yokubō)" (1999)	"Re-act" (1999)	"Dear Angel" (1999)

"Re-act" is Olivia's second solo single released on May 12, 1999. It was used in commercials for Kanebo Cosmetics' Kate range, which featured Olivia as a spokesperson. The music video was shot on April 17, 1999.

== Track listing ==
1. Re-act
2. Rolling Stone
3. Re-act (Instrumental)
4. Rolling Stone (Instrumental)
