= Bem-Vinda Vontade =

Studio album by Mice Parade
- Released: April 19, 2005
- Genres: Post-rock, electronica
- Length: 44:01
- Labels: Bubble Core, FatCat

Mice Parade chronology
Obrigado Saudade (2004)	Bem-Vinda Vontade (2005)	Mice Parade (2007)

Professional ratings
Review scores
Source	Rating
Pitchfork	link
PopMatters	link
Tiny Mix Tapes	link
Playlouder	(6.4/10) link

Bem-Vinda Vontade (Portuguese for "welcome, desire") is the sixth studio album by Mice Parade. It was released on April 19, 2005, by Bubblecore Records and FatCat Records. It contains vocals by Kristín Anna Valtýsdóttir of Múm and Ikuko Harada of Clammbon.

== Track listing ==
No.	Title	Length
1.	"Warm Hand in Farmland"	3:11
2.	"Nights Wave"	6:54
3.	"Passing & Galloping"	3:41
4.	"The Days Before Fiction"	8:09
5.	"Steady as She Goes"	4:46
6.	"Waterslide"	5:15
7.	"The Boat Room"	4:35
8.	"Ground as Cold as Common"	5:52
9.	"Ende"	1:36
Total length:		44:01

== Personnel ==
- Adam Pierce: drums, guitar, voice, percussion, synthesizer, rhodes piano, pianet, gamelan, cajon, dulcimer
- Dan Lippel: guitar
- Dylan Cristy: vibraphone
- Rob King: pianet, synthesizer
- Doug Scharin: drums, realtime digital effects on "The Days before Fiction"
- Brandon Knights: realtime analog effects on "The Days before Fiction"
- Ikuko Harada: voice on "Ground As Cold As Common"
- Kristín Anna Valtýsdóttir: accordion, voice on "Nights Wave" and "The Boat Room"
- Doro Tachler: synthesizer, voice on "The Days before Fiction"
- Rob Laakso: electric guitar on "Steady As She Goes"
- Josh Larue: additional guitar on "Nights Wave"
- Marc Wolf: additional guitar on "Nights Wave" and "Waterslide"
