= Caroline (singer) =

Japanese singer (born 1981)

Caroline Lufkin
- Born: January 9, 1981 (age 45); Okinawa, Japan
- Genre: Indietronica
- Occupation: Singer
- Instrument: Vocals
- Years active: 2004–present
- Label: Temporary Residence Limited
- Website: carolinelufkin.com

Caroline Lufkin (born January 9, 1981), better known mononymously as Caroline, is a Japanese singer and the younger sister of Olivia Lufkin. Caroline's music been released by Temporary Residence Ltd. Caroline is also a full-time member of Mice Parade (FatCat Records).

== Biography ==
Originally from Okinawa, Japan, Caroline Lufkin graduated from the Berklee School of Music in Boston in 2003. After graduating, she moved to Tokyo and began working on an album. Before signing with her current label, she had been working on an album in the Japanese music industry where she was being groomed to be a Japanese pop singer. However, she stepped away from the music industry in the middle of production because she had a clear vision of who she wanted to become, but realized too many people were pulling her project in conflicting directions. She knew the result would lack personality and ultimately leave no one satisfied. As an international half-American half-Japanese artist, she also understood that the traditional J-pop framework was not the path she wanted to follow. She made ripples across the Japanese pop music scene when she famously walked away from a lucrative major label contract that virtually guaranteed the same kind of bright-light super-stardom that had made her sister Olivia a household name in Tokyo.

Instead, Caroline decided to write, perform and record her own songs and began a search for indie labels. "Where's My Love?"—her first song—was posted on her MySpace page in late 2004, and it quickly went viral. She sent TRL an e-mail, asking if she could submit a demo, and included a link to her MySpace page. A few days later, Jeremy deVine, the founder and co-operator of the label, expressed interest in signing her.

"Where's My Love?" was officially released as a single on October 25, 2005, but was also distributed during the previous month. On March 6, 2006, Caroline released her first album, Murmurs, and soon after held her first live show at the South by Southwest music festival in Austin, Texas, on March 17 at the Whisky Bar.

In 2007, Caroline was asked to join Mice Parade of FatCat Records. She is now a full-time and touring member of Mice Parade and appeared on their singles, "What It Means To Be Left-Handed" (2010) and "Candela" (2013). Caroline has also collaborated with many artists and bands including Saxon Shore ("This Place"), Her Space Holiday, Lite ("Arch" and "Time Machine"), DJ Baku ("Buddha Boy"), and Anamanaguchi ("Sunset by Plane").

Caroline 2nd full album released "Verdugo Hills" (2011) and "Verdugo Hills Remixes" (2012) through Temporary Residence Limited.

In 2016, Caroline collaborated with relative, Masaru Shimabukuro who is one-third of Begin, the most successful band from Okinawa. They formed a group called Island Bag on the major record label Avex Trax, covering in English the number one hit song Uminokoe (written by Masaru Shimabukuro). The song played on AU commercials.

Caroline was also the voice of the Uniqlo Wake Up app for iOS, on which she collaborated with Yoko Kanno and Cornelius. Caroline is also known to lend her musicianship, whether singing, writing or both, to anime, commercials, and video games. Her clients include Netflix's Ghost in the Shell, Coded Arms Assault, Final Fantasy, Nikon, Gunze, NTT, Disney, Suntory, etc. Her work continues under different aliases.

== Discography ==
=== Albums ===
Solo albums

- Murmurs (2006, Temporary Residence)
- Murmurs Mixes (2008, Temporary Residence) [remix album]
- Verdugo Hills (2011, Temporary Residence)
- Verdugo Hills Remixes (2012, Temporary Residence) [remix album]

Island Bag (Caroline with Masaru Shimabukuro of Begin)

- Stars in the Sand (2016, Avex)

Mice Parade

- What It Means to Be Left-Handed (2010, FatCat)
- Live: England vs. France (2012, FatCat) [live album]
- Candela (2013, FatCat)
- Lapapọ (2022, Bubble Core)

=== Singles ===
- "Where's My Love?" (2005, Temporary Residence)
- "Sunrise" (2006, Temporary Residence)
- "Eisa Dancers" (2020) [Mice Parade]
- "Moonlight" (2024) [with Eli Walks]

=== Guest appearances ===
- Saxon Shore - "This Place" on It Doesn't Matter (2009, Broken Factory)
- Her Space Holiday - "Black Cat Balloons", "Shonanoka", "The Hummingbirds", "Come On All You Soldiers", "The Candle Jumped Over the Spoon", "Ghost in the Garden" & "Death of a Writer" on Her Space Holiday (2011, No More Good Ideas)
- Lite - "Time Machine" & "Arch" on Past, Present, Future (2012, I Want the Moon)
- DJ Baku - "Buddha Boy" on JapOneEra (2013, Popgroup)
- Anamanaguchi -"Sunset by Plane" on [USA] (2019, Polyvinyl)

=== Tracks appear on ===
- "Wonderlust" appears on TRL100: Thankful (2006, Temporary Residence)
- "Winter" appears on Destroy Independent Music! (2006, Temporary Residence)
- "Find Me" appears on Ghost in the Shell: SAC_2045 - Original Soundtrack 2 (2022)
