= Synchronicity (Olivia Lufkin album) =

Studio album by Olivia
- Released: December 6, 2000
- Genre: Alternative rock
- Label: cutting edge

Olivia chronology
Synchronicity (2000)	The Lost Lolli (2004)

"Synchronicity" is the debut album of singer-songwriter Olivia Lufkin. It includes her first six singles. The First Press edition includes an extra track called "Mint". The album reached #20 on Oricon charts and charted for five weeks.

The music video for "Dress Me Up" was shot on March 21 and 22, 2000 at Sunshine City, Tokyo, featuring footage of the roof, the aquarium and the shopping center.

== Track listing ==
1. "Solarhalfbreed"
2. "Walk on By"
3. "Dear Angel"
4. "Color of Your Spoon"
5. "Escape the Flames"
6. "Dress Me Up" (English Version)
7. "Soulmate"
8. "Dekinai"
9. "Grapefruit Tea"
10. "Crystalline"
11. "Liquid Skies"
12. "Re-act" (album mix)
13. "ILY (Yokubō)" (album mix)
14. "Mint" (Bonus Track) [First Press Only]
