= Obrigado Saudade =

2004 studio album by Mice Parade

Studio album by Mice Parade
- Released: January 27, 2004
- Length: 53:39
- Label: Bubblecore

Mice Parade chronology
All Roads Lead to Salzburg (2002)	Obrigado Saudade (2004)	Bem-Vinda Vontade (2005)

Obrigado Saudade (Portuguese for "thank you saudade") is the fifth studio album by American band Mice Parade. It was released on January 27, 2004, by Bubblecore Records. Kristín Anna Valtýsdóttir, a former member of the Icelandic band Múm, makes an appearance in "Two, Three, Fall" and "Spain".

== Critical reception ==
Professional ratings
Aggregate scores
Source	Rating
Metacritic	75/100
Review scores
Source	Rating
AllMusic	4/5 stars
Pitchfork	7.6/10
Stylus	C−
Tiny Mix Tapes	4/5 marks

At Metacritic, which assigns a normalized rating out of 100 to reviews from mainstream critics, the album has an average score of 75 based on 13 reviews, indicating "generally favorable reviews".

== Track listing ==
Obrigado Saudade track listing
No.	Title	Length
1.	"Two, Three, Fall"	4:43
2.	"Mystery Brethren"	10:57
3.	"Focus on the Roller Coaster"	4:59
4.	"And Still It Sits in Front of You"	3:51
5.	"Wave Greeting"	5:04
6.	"Here Today"	5:26
7.	"Milton Day"	4:11
8.	"Spain"	1:20
9.	"Out of the Freedom World"	6:30
10.	"Guitars for Plants"	4:43
11.	"Refrain Tomorrow"	1:55
Total length:		53:39
