= D&D (band) =

Japanese Eurobeat idol group

- D&D on the cover of their album Love Is a Melody (1998); From left: Chika, Olivia, Aya

Background information
- Origin: Japan
- Genres: Dance music, eurobeat, pop music
- Years active: 1996-1999
- Past members: Olivia Lufkin; Chikano Higa; Aya Uehara

D&D was a Japanese eurobeat idol group, featuring vocalist Olivia, and dancers Chikano and Aya. They debuted in 1996 with the single "In Your Eyes," and disbanded in 1999. Vocalist Olivia debuted as a solo musician in 1999, and sung several theme songs for the anime Nana in 2006.

== Biography ==
The three members of D&D attended the Okinawa Actors School, and were scouted by Rising Production for record company Avex Trax, debuting in 1996. Their first two singles, "In Your Eyes" and "Love Is a Melody" were used as background music for commercials for Yuri Takano Beauty Clinic that featured Namie Amuro as their spokesperson. As vocalist Olivia was not very confident in Japanese at the time of the group's debut, most songs were sung in English.Their third single, "Sunshine Hero," was used in a commercial for Morinaga's Piknik confectionery, which featured D&D themselves.

In March 1998, the group released their debut album Love Is a Melody: D&D Memorial 1st. It was commercially successful, debuting at number 5 on Oricon's albums chart, and was certified gold by the RIAJ for more than 250,000 copies shipped to stores. After Olivia participated in a collaboration song with Jean Michel Jarre and Tetsuya Komuro written for the 1998 FIFA World Cup, "Together Now," she began releasing material as a soloist. Chikano and Aya continued to release music together, as Aya & Chika from D&D. They released the single "Kiss in the Sun" in September 1998, followed by the opening theme song for the anime Power Stone, "Rise in My Heart," in April 1999. The group intended to release a third single in September 1999, however this was cancelled.

In July 2000, Aya and Chikano joined the girl group Hipp's, who performed in the television show The Night of Hit Parade, although Aya left the group several months later.The group, featuring Chika using her real name Chikano Higa (比嘉千賀乃), made their CD debut in 2001 with the song "Go! Go! Girl!" However, after only one single the band disbanded. In February 2009, Japanese magician Tatsuya Naka posted in his personal blog about attending Chika's wedding in Kyoto, to one of his childhood friends.

== Discography ==
=== Album ===
List of albums, with selected chart positions
Title	Album details	Peak positions	Sales	Certifications
Title	Album details	JPN	Sales	Certifications
Love Is a Melody: D&D Memorial 1st	Released: March 18, 1998; Label: Avex Trax; Formats: CD	5	277,000	RIAJ: Gold

=== Singles ===
List of singles, with selected chart positions
Title	Year	Peak chart positions	Sales	Album	
Title	Year	Oricon Singles Charts	Sales	Album	
"Single 1"	2000	10	100,000	Album Title 1	
"Single 2"	2000	15	75,000	Album Title 1	
"Single 3"	2001	5	120,000	Album Title 1	Album Title 2
"Single 4"	2001	8	90,000		Album Title 2
"Single 5"	2002	20	50,000	Non-album single	
"Single 6" (Note: Special collaboration single.)	2003	12	80,000	Non-album single	

=== Other appearances ===
List of non-studio album or guest appearances that feature D&D.
Title	Year	Album	Notes
"Watashi no Aoi Tori" (わたしの青い鳥, "My Blue Bird")	1998	Velfarre J-Pop Night presents Dance with You	Junko Sakurada cover.
"Cinderella Honeymoon" (シンデレラ・ハネムーン, Shinderera Hanemūn)	1998	Velfarre J-Pop Night presents Dance with You	Hiromi Iwasaki cover.
"Rise in My Heart (TV Edit)"	1999	Power Stone Original Soundtrack: Round 1	
"D&D Megamix"	2004	Super Eurobeat Vol. 150	
