= Dear Angel =

Single by Olivia

from the album Synchronicity
- Released: October 6, 1999
- Genre: Pop / Rock
- Label: Avex Trax

Olivia singles chronology
"Re-act" (1999)	"Dear Angel" (1999)	"Dress Me Up" (2000)

"Dear Angel" is Olivia's third solo single released on October 10, 1999. It was also released as the first Olivia single on vinyl record, included the original version "Dear Angel", its English version and two exclusives remixes. This was released on 1999-12-17 only at Shinseido with catalog Nº RR12-88144. "Dear Angel" and its B-side "Remember Me?" were both composed by Olivia, the first songs in her career to be written by herself. The English version of "Dear Angel" also features lyrics written by Olivia. The song, like her previous single "Re-act," was used in Kanebo Cosmetics' Kate commercials, and featured Olivia personally.

The music video was shot on September 8, 1999, aboard the Hikawa Maru cruise liner in Yamashita Park, Yokohama. Shots were filmed in a parlour and the wedding hall.

== Track listing ==
1. Dear Angel
2. Remember Me?
3. Dear Angel (English version)
4. Dear Angel (instrumental)

== Vinyl Track Listing ==
Track list (Side A) :

1. Dear Angel (M.I.D.KH-R club mix)
2. Dear Angel (English version)

Track list (Side B) :

1. Dear Angel (M.I.D.Bottoms Up mix)
2. Dear Angel

== Release history ==
Region	Date	Format	Distributing Label	Catalogue codes
Japan	October 6, 1999	8 cm CD, Rental 8 cm CD	Avex Trax	AVDD-20339
Japan	December 17, 1999	Vinyl	Avex Trax	Nº RR12-88144
