= Olivia Lufkin =

Japanese singer (born 1979)

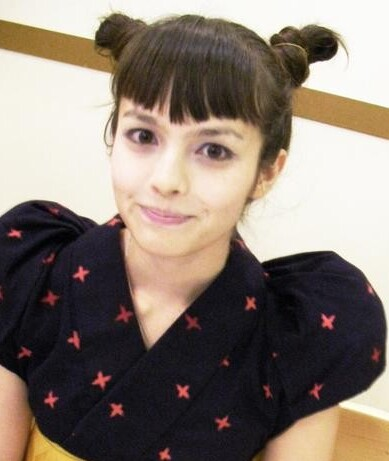
- Olivia Lufkin at the 2007 Japan Expo
- Born: December 9, 1979 (age 46); Naha, Okinawa Prefecture, Japan
- Other name: Olivia Inspi' Reira (Trapnest)
- Occupations: Singer; songwriter
- Years active: 1996–2012; 2026–present
- Height: 153 cm (5 ft 0 in)
- Spouse: Owen Vallis (m. 2012)
- Children: 1
- Relatives: Caroline Lufkin (younger sister); Jeffrey Lufkin (younger brother)
- Musical career
- Genres: Trip hop; pop; rock; ambient; electronica; industrial; downtempo
- Instrument: Vocals
- Labels: Avex Trax (1996–2000); Cutting Edge (2001–2010)

Olivia Lufkin (born December 9, 1979), known professionally as Olivia, is a Japanese singer and songwriter. Lufkin began her solo career after singing in the Japanese girl group D&D. She gained mainstream success in 2006 after creating songs for the fictional band Trapnest under the alias "Olivia Inspi' Reira (Trapnest)." The songs were used for the popular anime adaptation of Nana.

== Early life ==
Lufkin was born in Naha, Okinawa Prefecture. She was born as the daughter of a Japanese mother and an American father. Her two younger siblings are Jeffrey Lufkin, a musician she regularly collaborates with, and Caroline Lufkin, an independent musician. In 1982, she moved to San Diego, California, then back to Okinawa. She later moved to North Carolina for two years before returning to Okinawa.

== Career ==
Olivia was discovered by the director of Rising Productions (Vision Factory) while attending the Okinawa Actors' School, subsequently signing to Avex Trax as part of the Japanese idol group D&D. Producer Tetsuya Komuro thought Olivia would be perfect for a project he was planning along with Jean Michel Jarre. The project was to create the theme song for the 1998 FIFA World Cup entitled "Together Now". The single was released a month after D&D's first and only album. It was then decided that D&D would separate into two groups: 'Olivia' as Olivia's solo project, and Aya & Chika as 'Aya & Chika from D&D'.

=== 1999–2002: Solo artist ===
Her first single, "I.L.Y. (Yokubō)," had a driving pop rock sound. While she did not write her first two singles, which were composed and produced by T2ya, she did write her third single, "Dear Angel" and most subsequent singles.

In 1999 and 2000, Olivia released six singles, all with a pop-rock sound. Toward the end of 2000, she released her first solo album, Synchronicity, which contained all singles released to date, five new tracks and one bonus track. It would peak at number twenty on the Oricon Charts.

After a hiatus of more than a year, Olivia began to take control of her career, releasing her seventh single "Sea Me" on December 12, 2001. This marks her switch to one of Avex Trax's sub-labels, Cutting Edge, from which she continues to release singles and albums. The cover photograph for "Sea Me" was shot at the former Ishikawa Spinning Western House, located in Iruma, Saitama. Olivia worked as her own stylist for the photoshoot. Its release was accompanied by a music video shot at the Nakatajima Sand Dunes in Shizuoka Prefecture, and was intended to change her image into that of the rock musician. Her releases became increasingly rare and sporadic thereafter, with a video clips collection appearing four months later.

Olivia's next single, "Into the Stars," was planned to be released in July 2002 with an album at the end of the year. However, the single was postponed until September. The album release was similarly delayed.

=== 2003–2004: New style ===
2003 saw a complete style change and an onslaught of mini-albums as she began a series of collaborations with her brother, Jeffrey Lufkin. During this time, her music became considerably darker in both style and lyrical content. Instead of singles, four mini-albums were released exclusively through Tower Records Japan in Shibuya, Tokyo. These included Internal Bleeding Strawberry, Merry&Hell Go Round, Comatose Bunny Butcher and The Return of the Chlorophyll Bunny.

Alongside this, Olivia decided to launch a rare-items fashion label called Black Daisy Ville with her friend Friedia Niimura (Rin Kozue). This fashion line continued until the summer of 2004, featuring a line of clothes and accessories. Niimura later moved to the United States and the line discontinued.

In 2004, Olivia released her second album, The Lost Lolli. It featured the best material from her four mini-albums, and introduced two new tracks, "Alone in Our Castle" and "Fake Flowers", as well as two re-arrangements. The album was released nationwide with a limited first press version available at Tower Records Japan. "SpiderSpins (Lost Lolli Mix)" was used as a promotional radio single and video for the release. The Lost Lolli only peaked at #111 on the Oricon Charts. However, despite the moderate success of the album, Avex Trax released an overseas version of this album, reflecting Olivia's increasing success outside Japan. Typically, only chart-topping artists release overseas versions of their albums.

=== 2005–2006: Hiatus ===
After releasing The Lost Lolli, Olivia went on an unofficial hiatus except for a performance at the "Halloween of the Living Dead" concert hosted by Hyde on October 30, 2005. She continued to work as a fashion model.

In 2006 she provided vocals for the lead vocalist character Reira Serizawa in the fictional band Trapnest as a part of the anime adaptation of Nana. She produced songs under the alias Olivia Inspi' Reira (Trapnest) alongside fellow Avex artist, Anna Tsuchiya, who plays the role of Nana Osaki, the vocalist for Trapnest's rival band Black Stones.

The manga's author, Ai Yazawa, asked for Olivia when a staff member at Avex gave her a copy of Olivia's singles "Sea Me" and "Into the Stars". It is reported that she exclaimed, "It can only be her!" when she first heard the music. "A Little Pain" was Olivia's first release for this role in which she first made the general theme to the lyrics, then wrote the song in English. Later on, the lyrics were changed to Japanese. The single is about "Reira's loneliness, pain, and strength," as Olivia found that she could relate well to the character.

Olivia later said that her musical expression had changed, that the hiatus was because she had been "feeling pretty depressed," and "started to notice and realize a lot of her faults" and that her style "has gotten a lot more detailed," it's "pleasing to the ear"and "a lot cooler". Olivia had to research Reira's character, as she "never really read manga". "A Little Pain" is specifically tailored to the point of view of Reira. She states, "It was fun to sing as another person. Like an actress. I wrote the lyrics with the image that Reira looked to herself and wrote it. But because she's Reira, she has to help all around her, and that’s why it seems as though she sings for everyone, but she sings for herself. I wrote it with that idea in my mind."

When "A Little Pain" was first released, it reached number eight on the Oricon Charts, her first top ten hit. After the second week, this single had outsold the total sales for her debut single, "I.L.Y. (Yokubō)" which was her highest selling single to date at the time.

Olivia continued to release Nana-related material throughout 2006. The next opening and ending theme songs used were both by Olivia. The single "Wish/Starless Night" was released in October and peaked at number seven. Following the success of these releases, Olivia's first US appearance was scheduled for the Asian entertainment convention Pacific Media Expo held in Los Angeles, California in October 2006.

=== 2007–2011: Modest success ===
On January 17, 2007, The Cloudy Dreamer was released in CD and CD+DVD formats. The album debuted at number fifteen on the Oricon Weekly Charts - her highest ranking album to date. In addition to the singles previously released, the mini-album also featured the songs "Dream Catcher", which was used as the ending theme for the live action television drama series of Jigoku Shōjo; "If You Only Knew", which was used as the main theme for the Korean drama The Snow Queen; and an English version of "Wish". Later in February, the compilation album Olivia Inspi' Reira (Trapnest) was released featuring the singles from the Nana and some new songs.

Nana Best, another compilation album, was released shortly thereafter. This album featured the hit songs from the anime and one unreleased song by Olivia and Anna Tsuchiya. Olivia and Anna performed these songs together live at Shibuya-AX in March 2007.

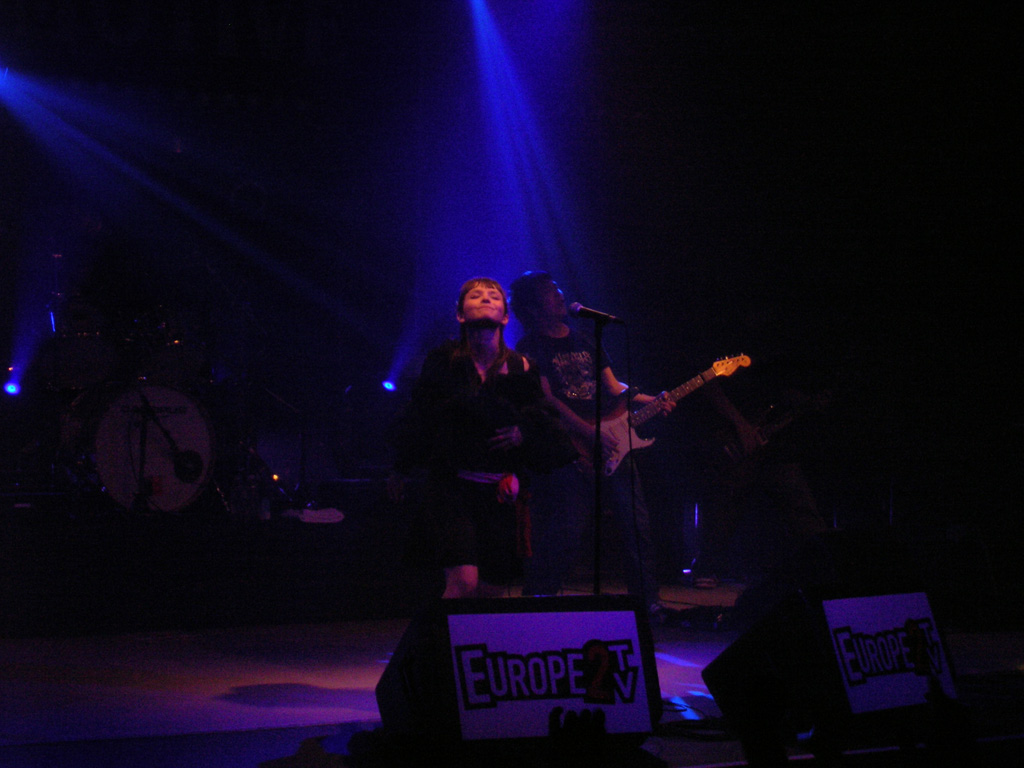
Olivia's Paris concert

On July 6, 2007, Olivia held a concert in Paris, France at the popular venue La Locomotive, singing songs from Olivia Inspi' Reira (Trapnest), The Lost Lolli and The Cloudy Dreamer. She made a guest appearance at the Japan Expo on July 6 and 7.

A new song, "Bleeding Heart", released on March 19, 2008, was a collaborative effort with her brother, Jeffrey Lufkin. It appeared on the Vision Factory compilation album Flower Festival: Vision Factory Presents.

Olivia released her sixth mini album, Trinka Trinka, on September 17 with all new material. It featured "Rain", which was used as the second ending theme to K-tai Investigator 7. The track lineup confused fans as a few of the track titles were changed, such as "Real Love", which she premiered during her Paris concert, which was renamed to "Your Smile". "I'm So Excited" was possibly retitled as "Trinka Trinka". Following the release of this mini album, Olivia held a live show on October 24, 2008, at Shibuya Womb.

On December 30, 2008, Olivia participated in a duo showcase with Inoran in which she covered a few of his songs such as "Owl's Tear" and "Monsoon Baby". They talked about their collaboration single which was released on April 15, 2009. It was titled "Sailing Free" and served as the theme song to a new game of the saga Sengoku Basara, called Sengoku Basara Battle Heroes. "Sailing Free" was her first single in three years.

Trinka Trinka was re-released in France it included "Sailing Free" and its b-sides ("Love Love Love" and "Undress") along with a bonus track which was revealed to be World's End Girlfriend's remix of "If You Only Knew". Olivia gave a concert for the visitors of the German anime convention Connichi at the Kongress Palais of Kassel (former Stadthalle Kassel) on September 10–12, 2010. Olivia talked about a new release, a greatest hits album that was released on October 13, 2010. This included two brand new tracks called "Sunlight" and "Be Your Friend". These saw another turn in Olivia's musical style, a combination of Trinka Trinka's pop style and The Lost Lolli's dark electronica.

Olivia's latest live appearance was at UppCon 2011, after which she took a hiatus from the music industry.

== Personal life ==
Olivia started working at a kindergarten in Okinawa, and later moved to California.

In 2012, she married Canadian Owen Vallis. They had a son Atlas in January 2014.

== Discography ==
=== Studio albums ===
List of albums, with selected chart positions
Title	Album details	Peak positions	Sales
Title	Album details	JPN	Sales
Synchronicity	Released: December 6, 2000; Label: Avex Trax; Formats: CD, digital download	20	41,000
The Lost Lolli	Released: February 18, 2004; Label: Cutting Edge; Formats: CD, digital download	121	2,700
Olivia Inspi' Reira (Trapnest)	Released under the name Olivia Inspi' Reira (Trapnest); Released: February 28, 2007; Label: Cutting Edge; Formats: CD, digital download	24	14,000

=== Extended plays ===
List of albums, with selected chart positions
Title	Album details	Peak positions		Sales
Title	Album details	JPN	TWN East Asian	Sales
Internal Bleeding Strawberry	Released: February 21, 2003; Label: Avex Trax; Formats: CD, digital download	—	—	
Merry & Hell Go Round	Released: June 27, 2003; Label: Cutting Edge; Formats: CD, digital download	—	—	
Comatose Bunny Butcher	Released: September 12, 2003; Label: Cutting Edge; Formats: CD, digital download	—	—	
The Return of the Chlorophyll Bunny	Released: December 3, 2003; Label: Cutting Edge; Formats: CD, digital download	—	—	
The Cloudy Dreamer	Released: January 1, 2007; Label: Cutting Edge; Formats: CD, CD+DVD, digital download	15	—	19,000
Trinka Trinka	Released: September 17, 2008; Label: Cutting Edge; Formats: CD, CD+DVD, digital download	76	20	1,700

=== Compilation albums ===
List of albums, with selected chart positions
Title	Album details	Peak positions		Sales
Title	Album details	JPN	TWN East Asian (Note: Position for Nana Best was taken from .)	Sales
Nana Best	Split compilation album with Anna Tsuchiya; Released: March 21, 2007; Label: Cutting Edge; Formats: CD, CD+DVD, digital download	20	3	21,000
Greatest Hits	Released: October 13, 2010; Label: Cutting Edge; Formats: 2CD, 2CD+DVD, digital download	108	—	900

=== Singles ===
==== As a lead artist ====
List of singles, with selected chart positions
Title	Year	Peak chart positions		Sales	Album
Title	Year	Oricon Singles Charts	Billboard Japan Hot 100 (Note: The Japan Hot 100 was established in February 2008.)	Sales	Album
"ILY (Yokubō)"	1999	32	—	25,000	Synchronicity
"Re-act"	1999	29	—	22,000	Synchronicity
"Dear Angel"	1999	29	—	15,000	Synchronicity
"Dress Me Up"	2000	36	—	22,000	Synchronicity
"Dekinai"	2000	57	—	4,000	Synchronicity
"Color of Your Spoon"	2000	30	—	14,000	Synchronicity
"Sea Me"	2001	89	—	2,500	The Lost Lolli
"Into the Stars"	2002	99	—	2,000	The Lost Lolli
"A Little Pain" (Note: As Olivia Inspi' Reira (Trapnest).)	2006	8	—	43,000	Olivia Inspi' Reira (Trapnest)
"Wish" (Note: As Olivia Inspi' Reira (Trapnest).)	2006	7	—	28,000	Olivia Inspi' Reira (Trapnest)
"Starless Night" (Note: As Olivia Inspi' Reira (Trapnest).)	2006	7	—	28,000	Olivia Inspi' Reira (Trapnest)
"Sailing Free"	2009	25	— (Note: Charted at number 33 on the Billboard Japan Hot Singles Sales chart.)	4,200	Greatest Hits

==== As a featured artist ====
List of singles, with selected chart positions
Title	Year	Peak chart positions	Sales	Album
Title	Year	Oricon Singles Charts	Sales	Album
"Together Now" (Jean Michel Jarre & Tetsuya Komuro)	1998	32	76,000	Music of the World Cup: Allez! Ola! Ole!

==== Promotional singles ====
Title	Year	Peak chart positions	Album
Title	Year	Billboard Japan Hot 100	Album
"Spiderspins"	2004	—	The Lost Lolli
"Stars Shining Out"	2007	—	The Cloudy Dreamer
"If You Only Knew (World's End Girlfriend Remix)"	2007	—	non-album single
"Rain"	2008	— (Note: Charted at number 81 on the Billboard Adult Contemporary Airplay chart.)	Trinka Trinka

=== DVDs ===
- Video Clips - Cutting Edge - March 13, 2002

== Other appearances ==
List of non-studio album or guest appearances that feature Olivia
Title	Year	Album	Notes
"Welcome to the Museum" (Tetsuya Komuro)	1998	TK 1998: Latest Works	Chorus
"Dreams" (Tetsuya Komuro)	1998	TK 1998: Latest Works	Chorus
"Empty Lies" (Tetsuya Komuro)	1998	TK 1998: Latest Works	Chorus
"Bleeding Heart"	2008	Flower Festival: Vision Factory Presents	
"Calling (Kingdom Mix)"	2012	Kingdom Hearts Dream Drop Distance OST	The World Ends with You soundtrack song cover
"Wish -Reimagined-"	2026	non-album single	
