= Wish/Starless Night =

Single by Olivia Lufkin Inspi' Reira(Trapnest)
- Released: October 11, 2006
- Genre: Pop rock
- Length: 0:13:08
- Label: Cutting Edge

Olivia Lufkin Inspi' Reira(Trapnest) singles chronology
"A Little Pain" (2006)	"Wish/Starless Night" (2006)	"Sailing Free" (2009)

CD&DVD cover
- The CD&DVD sleeve for "Wish/Starless Night"

"Wish/Starless Night" is Olivia's 10th single, and is her second single to be released under the name Olivia Lufkin Inspired by Reira (Trapnest). It was released on CD and CD&DVD on October 11, 2006. The two title tracks were recorded specifically for the Nana anime. "Wish" was used as the second opening theme and "Starless Night" was used as the second ending theme to the show. "Wish/Starless Night" is currently Olivia's highest debuting single, at #7 on the Oricon weekly charts.

Total sales thus far have reached 27,854 copies.

== Track listing ==
CD track list

1. "Wish"
2. "Starless Night"
3. "Close Your Eyes" / Olivia

DVD track list

1. "Wish" <Video Clip>
2. Trapnest Original Animation Clip

== Personnel ==
- Vocals by Olivia Lufkin
- Keyboard & Programming by Tomoji Sogawa
- Guitar & Bass by Susumu Nishikawa
- Guitar & Synthesizer by Kansei
- Guitar by Makoto Totani
- Programming by Jeffrey Lufkin

== Oricon Charts ==
Chart	Peak position	Sales
Daily	4	22.828
Weekly	7	22.828
