= Olivia Inspi' Reira (Trapnest) =

Studio album by Olivia
- Released: February 28, 2007
- Genre: Alternative rock
- Length: 45:53
- Label: Cutting Edge

OLIVIA album chronology
The Lost Lolli (2004)	Olivia Inspi' Reira (Trapnest) (2007)

Olivia Inspi' Reira (Trapnest), is the third album by Japanese singer-songwriter Olivia Lufkin. It was released on February 28, 2007, and features original songs and singles from the anime, Nana, for which she serves as the song vocal-cast of Reira of Trapnest. It includes two live versions of "A Little Pain" and "Wish" in addition to a previously unpublished song.

In addition to the CD, the DVD contains live performances of a little pain and SpiderSpins at the Nana Special Street Live held at Shinjuku Station Square June 25, 2006, as well as an animation clip of a little pain.

== Track listing ==
=== CD ===
No.	Title	Lyrics	Music	Arranger(s)	Length
1.	"A Little Pain"	Olivia Lufkin, Masumi Kawamura	Hiroo Yamaguchi	Tomoji Sogawa
2.	"Wish"	Olivia Lufkin, Chazne	Olivia Lufkin, rui	Tomoji Sogawa, kansei, rui
3.	"Starless Night"	Olivia Lufkin, Space Critter	Hideyuki Obata	Tomoji Sogawa
4.	"Shadow of Love"	Olivia Lufkin, Chazne	Olivia Lufkin, rui	rui, kansei
5.	"Tell Me"	Olivia Lufkin	Olivia Lufkin, rui	rui, kansei
6.	"Rock You"	Chazne, Eclipse	Naruya Ihashi	kansei, rui
7.	"Winter Sleep"	Eclipse	rui, Olivia Lufkin	rui, kansei
8.	"Recorded Butterflies (Studio Live)"	Masumi Kawamura, Olivia Lufkin	rui, Olivia Lufkin	kansei, rui
9.	"Wish (Live)"	Olivia Lufkin, Chazne	rui, Olivia Lufkin	Tomoji Sogawa, kansei, rui
10.	"A Little Pain (Studio Live)"	Olivia Lufkin, Masumi Kawamura	Hiroo Yamaguchi	Tomoji Sogawa

=== DVD ===
1. Nana Special Street Live at Shinjuku Station Square 25 June 2006:
  01. A Little Pain
  02. SpiderSpins
2. A Little Pain: Trapnest original animation clip (Studio Live TV size ver)
