= Together Now =

Single by Olivia Lufkin, Jean Michel Jarre & Tetsuya Komuro

from the album Music of the World Cup: Allez! Ola! Ole!
- Released: April 22, 1998
- Genre: Pop / electronica
- Label: SMEJ
- Songwriter: Olivia Lufkin
- Producers: Tetsuya Komuro, Jean Michel Jarre

Jean Michel Jarre singles chronology
"Rendez-Vous '98" (1998)	"Together Now" (1998)	"C'est la vie" (2000)

Olivia chronology
"Together Now (1998)	I.L.Y. (Yokubō) (1999)

Tetsuya Komuro singles chronology
""Together Now (1998 FIFA World Cup Theme)"" (1998)

Music video
- "Together Now" on YouTube

"Together Now" is a collaboration between French composer/producer Jean Michel Jarre and Japanese composer/producer Tetsuya Komuro. It was the France 1998 FIFA World Cup theme song. Olivia Lufkin was the vocalist and the lyricist for this song. "Together Now" also features as track 15 of Music of the World Cup: Allez! Ola! Ole!. However, the single was only retailed in Japan. Surprisingly, despite both Lufkin and Tetsuya Komuro being under Avex, the single itself was released under SMEJ. The single reached number 32 on the Oricon charts and charted for 10 weeks.

== Track listing ==
1. Together Now (Original Full Mix)
2. Together Now (Parlez Vous Francais Mix)
3. Together Now (Radio Edit (Breakdown Mix))
4. Oxygene 13 (TK Remix) (Jean Michel Jarre)
5. Together Now (Instrumental)
