= Syrup USA =

- Origin: Boston, Massachusetts
- Genres: Indie pop
- Years active: 1993–1998
- Labels: Tru Luv, Flydaddy Records
- Past members: Seana Carmody; Matt Fein; Orrin Anderson; Sam Mallery

Syrup USA were a four-piece indie pop band from Boston, Massachusetts, that formed in 1993 and disbanded in 1998. The brainchild of lead singer and guitarist Seana Carmody (formerly of Swirlies), their sound blended elements of 1960s pop and synthpop, and was compared to Stereolab.

== Discography ==
=== Studio albums ===
- All Over the Land (1997, Flydaddy Records)

=== Singles & EPs ===
- Spinning at 45 Revolutions Per Minute (1995, Tru Luv)
- "Teen Death" (1995, Tru Luv)

== Members ==
- Seana Carmody - vocals, guitar
- Matt Fein - organ, guitar
- Orrin Anderson - drums
- Sam Mallery - bass, vocals
