= Vintage musical equipment =

Old music gear

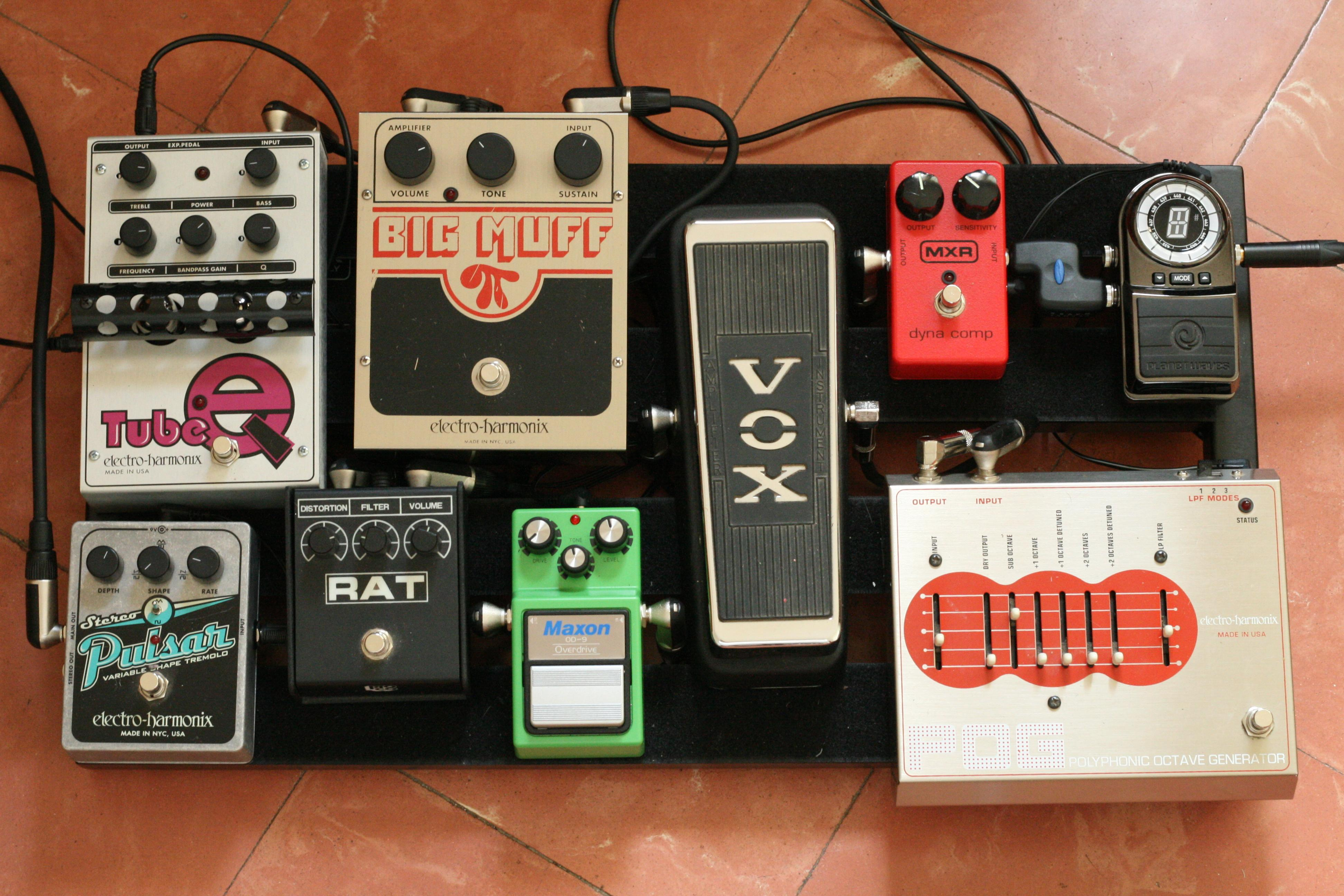
A guitar pedalboard including several vintage effects pedals: Electro-Harmonix Big Muff and Vox wah-wah pedals from the 1960s and 70s

Vintage musical equipment is older music gear, including instruments, amplifiers and speakers, sound recording equipment and effects pedals, sought after, maintained and used by record producers, audio engineers and musicians who are interested in historical music genres. While any piece of equipment of sufficient age can be considered vintage, the term is typically applied to instruments and gear from the 1970s and earlier. Guitars, amps, pedals, electric keyboards, sound recording equipment (e.g., reel-to-reel tape decks and microphones) from the 1950s to 1970s are particularly sought after, while musical equipment from the 1940s and earlier is generally far more expensive and sought out mainly by museums or collectors to preserve historical equipment, rather than to perform with.

Older gear is often known for its unique tonal or sound-shaping qualities. The cost of vintage gear may be higher than the reissued model or its contemporary equivalent, depending on the specific item's rarity, demand, and condition.

== Guitars ==
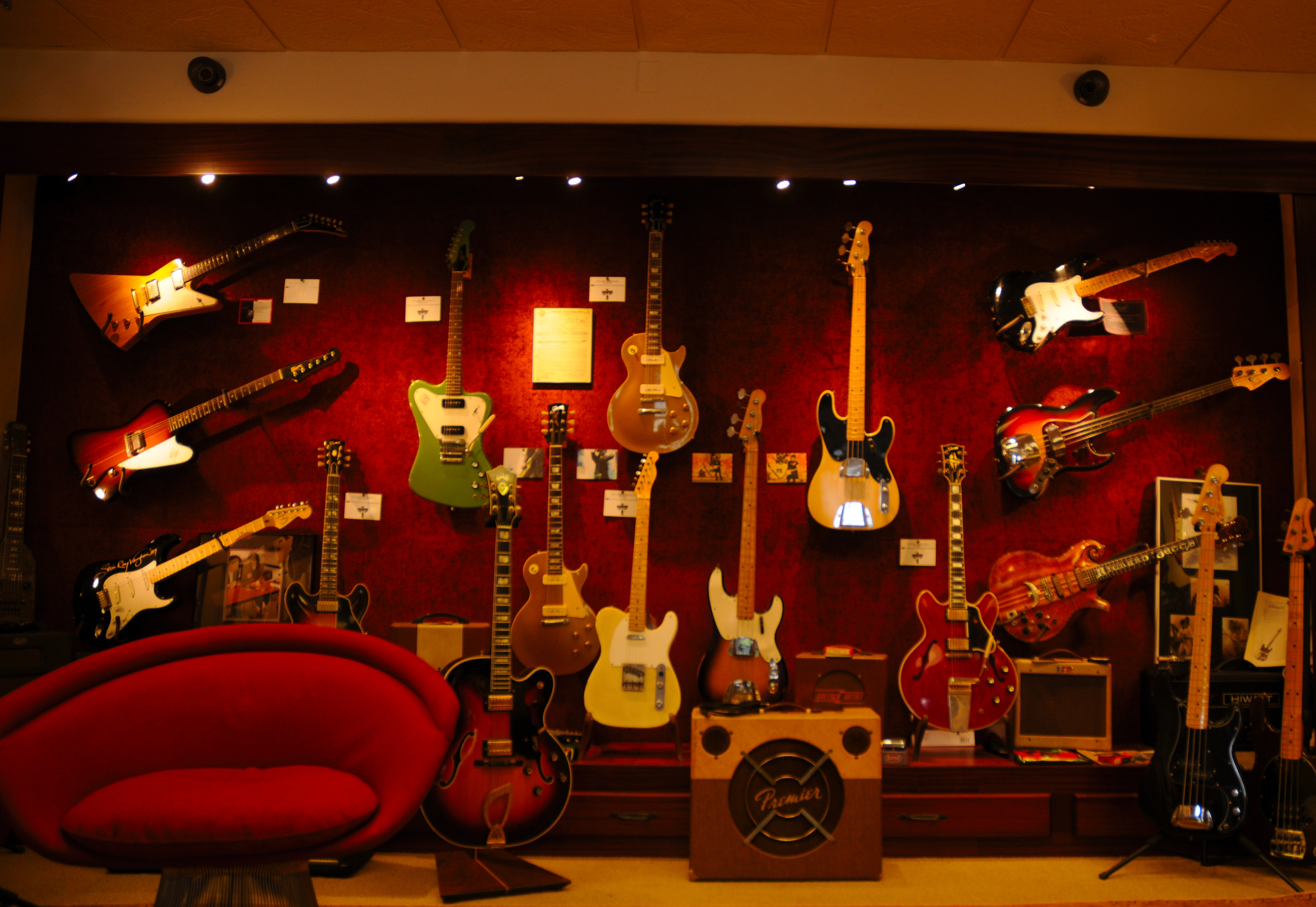
A collection of vintage guitars

As early as the 1970s, musicians began to recognize the value of older instruments from the 1940s and 1950s. Among guitar enthusiasts, the mass production of both acoustic and electric guitars served to highlight the quality hand workmanship, crafting, finishing and materials of older instruments. Historians such as George Gruhn helped to codify both the monetary value and sound quality of these instruments.

Examples of well-known vintage electric guitars include 1950s and 1960s era models like the Fender Stratocaster and Telecaster, and the Gibson Les Paul. Although less well-known and not as financially valuable, older electric guitars under the names of Harmony, Danelectro or Kay are becoming increasingly collectible.

Examples of well-known vintage acoustic guitars include Martin and Gibson models typically built prior to the 1970s, 1920s to 1930s Nationals and Dobros, and 1930s era Recording Kings, among others.

== Keyboards ==
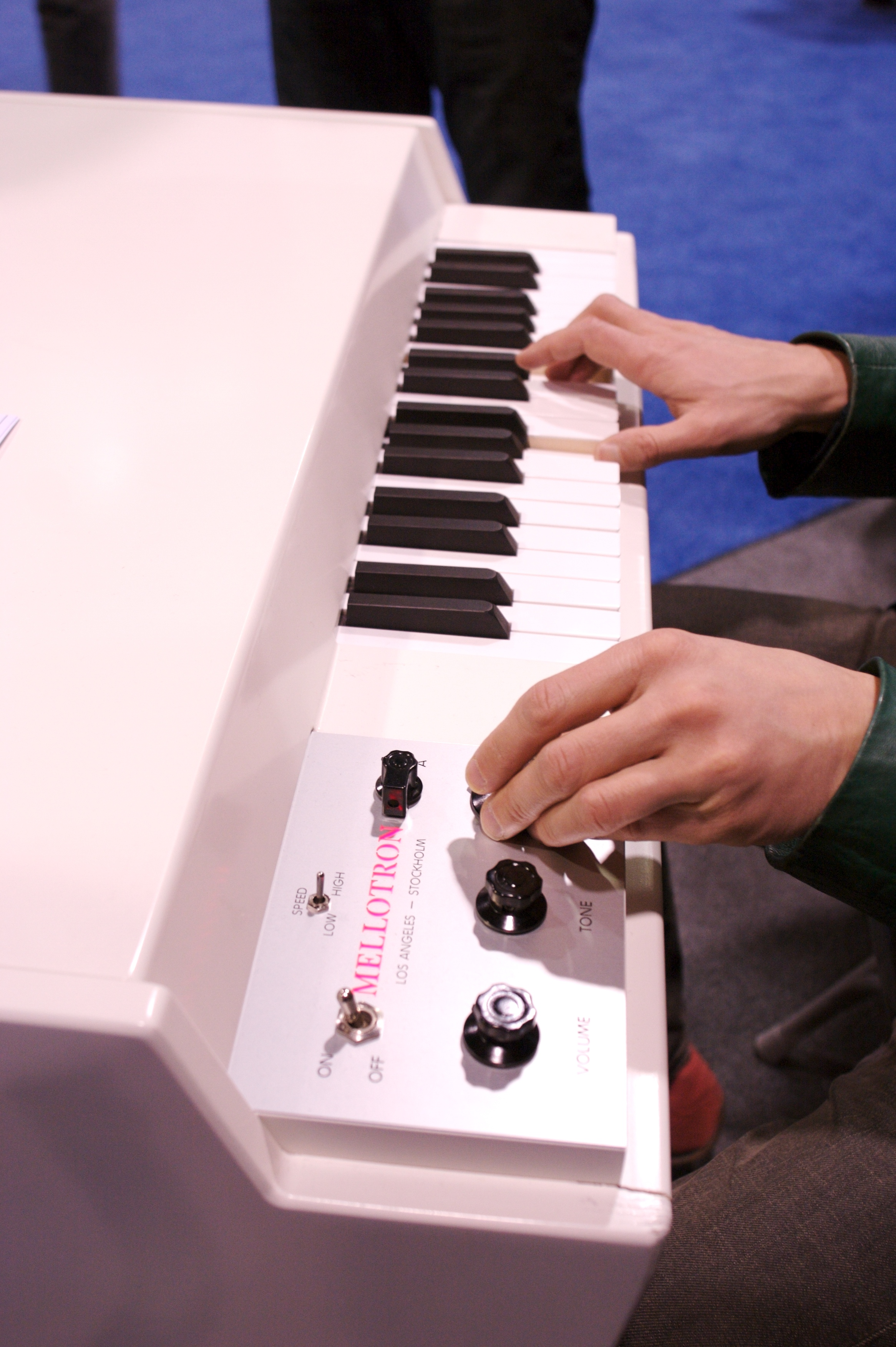
A Mellotron keyboard

Prior to the popularity of electronic music in the 1980s and 1990s, electromechanical instruments such as the Fender Rhodes electric piano and the Hammond organ were widely used. The Hammond organ was a staple instrument in jazz, blues and early rock and roll up through the 1970s; Booker T. Jones played the Hammond on many recordings for Stax Records that helped define the sound of soul music in the 1960s.

Musical synthesizers first came to popular music in the mid- to late-1960s and evolved through the 1970s and 1980s. In the 1970s, synthesizers were rare and expensive, and generally owned only by major recording studios, record producers, and established artists. It was not until the release of Yamaha's DX-7 that an affordable, mass-market digital synth became available to the general public.

Because the technology evolved so quickly, many synthesizers were manufactured for a very short period of time, and would later be sought after by musicians and collectors seeking unique or unusual sounds. Popular brands of vintage synthesizers include Moog, Korg, ARP, and later Roland, and Yamaha.

== Amplifiers ==
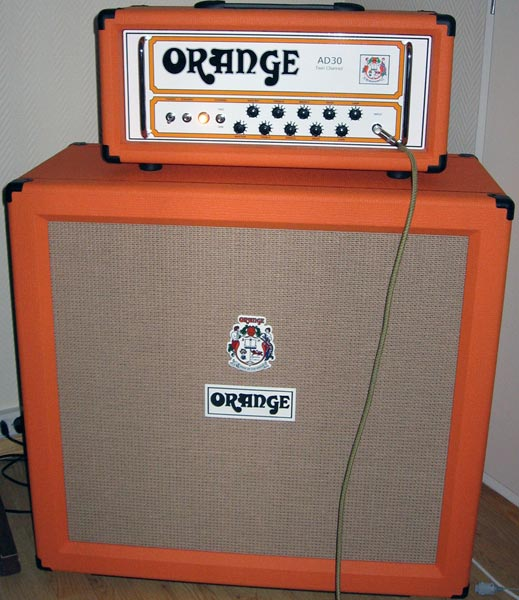
Orange amplifier and cabinet from the 2000s with a look reminiscent of the 1960s and 70s

The first guitar amplifiers were made in the 1920s and 1930s using vacuum tubes and speakers to amplify an instrument's sound. These tube amps remained the standard until the 1970s when transistors became cheaper to manufacture and maintain and lighter in weight. During the 1980s, when most guitar amps being manufactured used "solid state" semiconductor technology, many musicians seeking an older style of sound favored older amps that used vacuum tubes (called "valves" in the UK). Popular vintage models include the Fender Showman, Fender Twin, Bassman and Vibroverb amps, and older models made by Ampeg, Gibson, Marshall, and Vox, as well as other smaller companies such as Valco, Danelectro, and Premier. By the 1990s, many of these amplifiers had become so popular and sought after, that manufacturers began to reissue some models, while newer, smaller companies built new amps that boasted a "vintage sound". Some recording studios have a selection of the most popular vintage guitar combo amps, amp heads and speaker stacks, so that performers can get a retro sound.

== Effects pedals ==
When electronic transistors began to replace vacuum tubes, it became possible to fit aural effects circuits into a portable device. These first effects pedals —or "stompboxes", so called because a guitarist would stomp on one to activate it—were manufactured in the early 1960s and became popular through groups like The Kinks and The Rolling Stones by the middle of the decade. Early pedals mainly created a distortion or "fuzz-tone" effect, but with the arise of psychedelic rock, more esoteric effects became popular. Warwick Electronics manufactured the first wah-wah pedal in 1967 and that same year Roger Mayer issued the first octave effect.

The following year saw the arrival of Univox's phase shifter and chorus effect. These pedals became favorite effects of guitarists like Jimi Hendrix and Robin Trower. By the mid-1970s a variety of solid-state effects pedals including flangers, chorus pedals, ring modulators and phase shifters were available.

While digitized rack units became the standard for popular artists in the 1980s, older effects pedals were preferred by punk and garage rock bands. Seattle grunge rockers Mudhoney celebrated these roots on their 1988 EP Superfuzz Bigmuff, named for two of the band's favorite guitar effects pedals: the Univox Super-Fuzz and the Electro-Harmonix Big Muff, which helped to provide the band's signature "dirty" sound. When fellow grungers Nirvana made it big in 1991', interest in vintage pedals grew among their fans.

== See also ==
- Relic'ing
- Vintage (design)
