= Hasret =

Hasret is a Turkish given name which is used for both female and male. People with the name include:

== Given name ==
- Hasret Altındere (born 1980), Turkish footballer
- Hasret Bozkurt (born 2001), Turkish judoka
- Hasret Gültekin (1971–1993), Kurdish musician
- Hasrat Jafarov (born 2002), Azerbaijani wrestler
- Hasret Kayikçi (born 1991), German footballer
