= Mice Parade =

American band

- Genres: Laptronica; indie; post-rock; shoegaze
- Years active: 1998-present
- Labels: Bubble Core Records; FatCat
- Members: Adam Pierce; Doug Scharin; Dylan Cristy; Rob Laakso; Caroline Lufkin; Dan Lippel; Josh McKay; Gunnar Örn Tynes
- Website: https://www.miceparademusic.com/

Mice Parade is an American indie rock band from New York City, led by percussionist Adam Pierce. Mice Parade is an anagram of Pierce's name.

== Biography ==
Adam Pierce started Mice Parade as a solo project while he also played in groups including The Philistines Jr., Boston indie band Swirlies, and post-rock group HiM. Mice Parade's albums were initially released on Pierce's own Bubble Core Records, with subsequent records being released on FatCat.

Earlier albums such as The True Meaning of Boodleybaye and Ramda were instrumental based, blending Pierce's complex percussion with electronica. For 2001's Mokoondi Pierce formed a loose recording and touring band, adding harmonic influences from Africa and the Far East. Vocals were added to 2004's Obrigado Saudade and subsequent albums have featured guest vocalists such as Somi, Lætitia Sadier, and Caroline Lufkin alongside Pierce.

From 2007's self-titled Mice Parade album the songs took on a more accessible form, while continuing to combine eclectic influences with intricate percussion and complex arrangements. By 2013's Candela the touring group had slimmed down to a smaller group of collaborators.

In July 2022, the band released lapapọ, their first new album in nine years.

== Discography ==
- The True Meaning of Boodleybaye (1998)
- Ramda (1999)
- Mokoondi (2001)
- All Roads Lead to Salzburg (2002)
- Obrigado Saudade (2004)
- Bem-Vinda Vontade (2005)
- Mice Parade (2007)
- What It Means to Be Left-Handed (2010)
- Live: England vs. France (2012)
- Candela (2013)
- Lapapọ (2022)

== In other media ==
The band's song "Headphonland: The Gangster Chapter" was featured in "Betty and Veronica", an episode of the American television series Veronica Mars.
