= Rich Costey =

American record producer

- Born: Richard Costey; June 27, 1969 (age 57); Los Angeles, California, U.S.
- Genres: Alternative rock; experimental rock; indie rock; post-punk revival; art rock; electronica
- Occupations: Record producer; mixer; engineer
- Years active: 1995–present
- Website: costey.net

Richard Costey (born June 27, 1969) is an American music producer, mixer, and engineer. He has worked with musicians across genres including rock, indie, pop, hip-hop, and electronica. Notable collaborators include Fiona Apple, Vampire Weekend, Foo Fighters, Sigur Rós, Muse, Foster the People, Swirlies, Sam Fender, and My Chemical Romance. He has won multiple Grammys and a Latin Grammy for his work.

== Select discography ==
=== producing, engineering, mixing ===
- Deftones - "Private Music" mixer
- Sombr - "Back to Friends" mixer
- Linkin Park - "From Zero" mixer (for selected tracks)
- Yungblud - "Idols" mixer
- Ghost - "Rite Here Rite Now" mixer
- Foster the People - "Paradise State of Mind"
- Muse - "Black Holes and Revelations" producer, mixer
- Foo Fighters - "Echoes, Silence, Patience & Grace" mixer
- Fun. - "Some Nights" mixer
- Kimbra - "The Golden Echo" producer
- Korn - "Requiem" mixing engineer
- Lovejoy - "Wake Up & It's Over" mixing engineer
- Fiona Apple - "When the Pawn..." mixer
- Mew - “Frengers” & “No More Stories…” producer
- Muse - "Showbiz" mixer
- Muse - "Origin of Symmetry" mixing engineer
- Audioslave - "Audioslave" mixing engineer
- Muse - "Absolution" producer, mixer
- The Mars Volta - "De-Loused in the Comatorium" engineer, mixer
- My Chemical Romance - "Three Cheers for Sweet Revenge" mixing engineer
- Franz Ferdinand - "You Could Have It So Much Better" producer, mixer
- Bloc Party - "Silent Alarm" mixer
- Weezer - "Make Believe" mixer
- Mastodon - "Blood Mountain" producer, mixer
- Interpol - "Our Love to Admire" producer, mixer
- Muse - "HAARP" producer, mixer
- Arctic Monkeys - "Humbug" mixer (for the track "My Propeller")
- Foster the People - "Torches" mixer
- Deftones - "Koi No Yokan" mixer
- Muse - "The 2nd Law" producer, mixer
- Bruce Springsteen - "Wrecking Ball" mixer (for selected tracks)
- Muse - "Drones" producer, mixer
- Chvrches - "The Bones of What You Believe" mixer (for selected tracks)
- HAIM - "Days Are Gone" producer, mixer (for selected tracks)
- Vampire Weekend - "Modern Vampires of the City" mixer
- Muse - "Simulation Theory" producer, mixer
- Death Cab for Cutie - "Kintsugi" producer, mixer
- Of Monsters and Men - "Beneath the Skin" producer, mixer
- Biffy Clyro - "Ellipsis" producer, mixer
- Bastille - "Wild World" mixer
- The Killers - "Wonderful Wonderful" mixer (for selected tracks)
- HAIM - "Something to Tell You" mixer (for selected tracks)
- Snow Patrol - "Wildness" producer, mixer
- Sam Fender - "Hypersonic Missiles" producer, mixer
- Blink-182 - "Nine" mixer
- Biffy Clyro - "A Celebration of Endings" producer, mixer
- Ice Cube - "War & Peace Vol. 1 (The War Disc)" engineer, mixer
- Rage Against the Machine - "Renegades" mixer
- My Chemical Romance - "Life on the Murder Scene" mixer
- Primal Scream - "More Light" mixer
- The Shins - "Port of Morrow" mixer
- Carly Rae Jepsen - "E-MO-TION" mixer (for selected tracks)
- Plan B - "Ill Manors" mixer
- Miguel - "Kaleidoscope Dream" mixer (for selected tracks)
- Santigold - "99¢" mixer
- Jenny Lewis - "The Voyager" producer, mixer
- Alt-J - "Fitzpleasure" mixer
- Major Lazer - "Free the Universe" mixer (for selected tracks)
- Santigold - "Master of My Make-Believe" mixer (for selected tracks)
- Death Cab for Cutie - "Thank You for Today" producer, mixer
- Mother Mother - "Nobody Escapes" unknown
- My Chemical Romance - "Three Cheers for Sweet Revenge (Deluxe Edition)" mixer
- Box Car Racer - "Box Car Racer (Eponymous Album)" mixer
