= Aya Ueto discography =

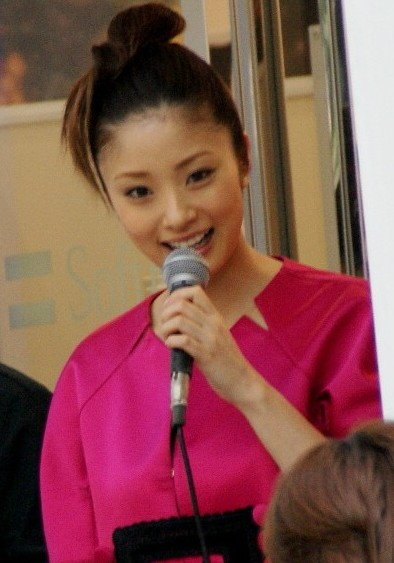
- Ueto at the iPhone 3GS launch party in 2009
- Studio albums: 5
- Compilation albums: 2
- Singles: 16
- Video albums: 8
- Music videos: 18

The discography of Japanese pop singer Aya Ueto consists of five studio albums, two compilation albums, sixteen singles, eight video albums and eighteen music videos.

== Albums ==
=== Studio albums ===
Title	Album details	Peak chart positions	Sales
Ayaueto	Released: March 12, 2003; Label: Flight Master; Formats: CD	5	54,000
Message	Released: March 3, 2004; Label: Flight Master; Formats: CD	6	75,000
Re.	Released: December 8, 2004; Label: Flight Master; Formats: CD	19	35,000
License	Released: March 8, 2006; Label: Flight Master; Formats: CD, digital download	19	22,000
Happy Magic: Smile Project	Released: July 15, 2009; Label: Pony Canyon; Formats: CD, digital download	20	11,000

=== Compilation albums ===
Title	Album details	Peak chart positions	Sales
Uetoayamix	Released: August 24, 2005; Label: Flight Master; Formats: CD, digital download	47	7,000
Best of Uetoaya: Single Collection	Released: September 20, 2006; Label: Flight Master; Formats: CD, digital download	5	48,000

== Singles ==
List of singles, with selected chart positions and sales, showing year released and album name.
Title	Year	Peak chart positions			Sales		Album
Title	Year	Daily	Weekly	Yearly	Debut	Overall	Album
"Pureness"	2002	1	4	—	46,000	96,000	Ayaueto
"Kizuna"	2002	3	5	—	32,000	57,000	Ayaueto
"Hello"	2003	5	10	—	23,000	41,000	Ayaueto
"Message/Personal"	2003	5	10	—	18,000	28,000	Message
"Kanshō/Mermaid"	2003	7	9	—	27,000	40,000	Message
"Binetsu"	2003	7	14	—	15,000	24,000	Message
"Ai no Tame ni."	2004	4	6	94	31,000	99,000	Message
"Kaze/Okuru Kotoba"	2004	5	8	227	22,000	44,000	Re.
"Afuresō na Ai, Daite/Namida wo Fuite"	2004	10	10	288	19,000	34,000	Re.
"Usotsuki"	2004	10	12	—	19,000	26,000	Re.
"Yume no Chikara"	2005	5	7	123	30,000	85,000	License
"Kaze wo Ukete"	2005	12	17	332	14,000	27,000	License
"Egao no Mama de"	2006	8	15	—	10,000	13,000	License
"Way to Heaven"	2007	17	20	—	8,000	12,000	Happy Magic: Smile Project
"Namida no Niji/Save Me"	2007	11	17	—	9,000	15,000	Happy Magic: Smile Project
"Smile for.../Mō Ichido Dake"	2009	8	10	485	9,000	13,000	Happy Magic: Smile Project
"—" denotes missing information.

== Videos ==
=== Video albums ===
Title	Album details	Peak chart positions
The Complete Ueto Aya	Released: December 21, 2001; Label: Happinet; Formats: DVD, VHS	—
Uetoaya Films Vol. 1: "Puzzle"	Released: February 14, 2003; Label: Flight Master; Formats: DVD, VHS	35
Ueto Aya First Live Tour Pureness 2003	Released: August 6, 2003; Label: Flight Master; Formats: DVD	27
Ueto Aya Clips 01	Released: September 18, 2003; Label: Flight Master; Formats: DVD	25
Ueto Aya Clips 02	Released: March 16, 2005; Label: Flight Master; Formats: DVD	57
Attack No.1 Clips	Released: September 21, 2005; Label: Flight Master; Formats: DVD	—
Ueto Aya Live Tour 2005: "Genki Hatsu Ratsū?"	Released: December 14, 2005; Label: Flight Master; Formats: DVD	53
Ueto Aya Best Live Tour 2007: "Never Ever"	Released: December 5, 2007; Label: Flight Master; Formats: DVD	34
Ueto Aya Live Event 2009: "Happy Magic: Smile Miles Milles"	Released: December 16, 2009; Label: Pony Canyon; Formats: DVD	45
"—" denotes items that did not chart or missing information.

=== Music videos ===
Year	Title	Director(s)
2002	"Pureness"	Takehito Kobayashi
2002	"Kizuna"	Takehito Kobayashi
2003	"Hello"	Takehito Kobayashi
2003	"Message"	Hideaki Sunaga
2003	"Kanshō"	Hideaki Sunaga
2003	"Binetsu"	Kentarō Moriya
2004	"Ai no Tame ni."	Hideaki Sunaga
2004	"Kaze"	Eiki Takahashi
2004	"Afuresō na Ai, Daite"	Tsuyoshi Inoue
2004	"Usotsuki"	Tsuyoshi Inoue
2005	"Yume no Chikara"	Hideaki Sunaga
2005	"Kaze o Ukete"	Hideaki Sunaga
2006	"Egao no Mama de"	Kensuke Kawamura
2006	"Shimokita Ijō Harajuku Miman"	Tomoyuki Suzuki
2007	"Way to Heaven"	Hideaki Sunaga
2007	"Namida no Niji"	Takehito Kobayashi
2009	"Smile for..."	Takeshi Shibasaki, Tomoyo Yoneda
2009	"Smile for..." (Live Version)	Tsuyoshi Inoue
