= Way to Heaven =

Single by Aya Ueto

from the album Happy Magic: Smile Project
- Released: March 14, 2007
- Genre: Pop
- Length: 4:35
- Label: Flight Master
- Songwriter(s): Shoko, Shōichirō Hirata
- Producer(s): Hirata

Aya Ueto singles chronology
"Egao no Mama de" (2006)	"Way to Heaven" (2007)	"Namida no Niji/Save Me" (2007)

"Way to Heaven" is the fourteenth single by Japanese recording artist Aya Ueto. It was released on March 14, 2007. "Way to Heaven" was included on the standard edition of Ueto's fifth studio album Happy Magic: Smile Project. The single was released in two formats: the limited edition, which includes an A4-sized 92-page photo book and a bonus DVD featuring music videos, TV spots, and footage of Ueto's past release events, and standard CD-only edition.

== Chart performance ==
"Way to Heaven" debuted on the Oricon Daily Singles chart at number 17 on March 13, 2007, and peaked at number 20 on the Oricon Weekly Singles chart, with 7,554 copies sold in its first week. The single charted for five weeks and has sold a total of 12,144 copies.

== Track listing ==
No.	Title	Lyrics	Music	Arranger(s)	Length
1.	"Way to Heaven"	Shoko	Shōichirō Hirata	Hirata	4:35
2.	"Owari ni Shiyō" (終わりにしよう "Let's End It")	Miyu Yuzuki	Seiichi Ohnuki	Sin	5:24
3.	"Shimokita Ijō, Harajuku Miman (French Bossa Version)" (下北以上 原宿未満 "Beyond Shimokita, Before Harajuku")	Fumiya Fujii	Fujii, Yoshiyuki Sahashi	Gota Yashiki	4:34
4.	"Way to Heaven (Instrumental)"		Hirata	Hirata	4:35
Total length:					19:19

Limited edition DVD
No.	Title	Length
1.	"Pureness (Music Clip)"
2.	"Kizuna (Music Clip)"
3.	"Hello (Music Clip)"
4.	"Message (Music Clip)"
5.	"Kanshō (Music Clip)"
6.	"Binetsu (Music Clip)"
7.	"Ai no Tame ni. (Music Clip)"
8.	"Kaze (Music Clip)"
9.	"Afuresō na Ai, Daite (Music Clip)"
10.	"Usotsuki (Music Clip)"
11.	"Yume no Chikara (Music Clip)"
12.	"Kaze o Ukete (Music Clip)"
13.	"Egao no Mama de (Music Clip)"
14.	"Shimokita Ijō, Harajuku Miman (Music Clip)"
15.	"Pureness (TV Spot)"
16.	"Kizuna (TV Spot)"
17.	"Ayaueto (TV Spot)"
18.	"Message/Personal (TV Spot)"
19.	"Kanshō/Mermaid (TV Spot)"
20.	"Binetsu (TV Spot)"
21.	"Ai no Tame ni. (TV Spot)"
22.	"Message (TV Spot)"
23.	"Kaze/Okuru Kotoba (TV Spot)"
24.	"Afuresō na Ai, Daite/Namida o Fuite (TV Spot)"
25.	"Usotsuki (TV Spot)"
26.	"Re. (TV Spot)"
27.	"Yume no Chikara (TV Spot)"
28.	"Kaze o Ukete (TV Spot)"
29.	"Ueto Aya Live Tour 2005: Genki Hatsu Ratsū? (TV Spot)"
30.	"Egao no Mama de (TV Spot)"
31.	"License (TV Spot)"
32.	"Best of Uetoaya: Single Collection (TV Spot)"
33.	"Pureness Aya Ueto Debut Live Event"
34.	"Aya Ueto Special Live Event"
35.	"Aya Ueto Special 1st Debut Anniversary and "Kanshō/Mermaid" Release Event"
36.	"Aya Ueto "Binetsu" Release Event"
37.	"Aya Ueto Message Release Event"
38.	"Aya Ueto "Usotsuki" Release Event"
39.	"Aya Ueto Re. Release Event"
40.	"Aya Ueto "Yume no Chikara" Release Event"

== Charts ==
Chart (2007)	Peak position
Oricon Daily Singles	17
Oricon Weekly Singles	20

== Release history ==
Region	Date	Format	Label
Japan	March 14, 2007	CD, CD+DVD, digital download	Pony Canyon
Taiwan	March 16, 2007	CD, CD+DVD	Pony Canyon
