= Best of Ueto Aya: Single Collection =

Best of Uetoaya: Single Collection

Compilation album by Aya Ueto
- Released: September 20, 2006
- Recorded: 2002–2006
- Genre: Pop, pop rock
- Length: 79:59
- Label: Flight Master
- Producer: Gorō Kumagai

Aya Ueto chronology
License (2006)	Best of Uetoaya: Single Collection (2006)	Happy Magic: Smile Project (2009)

Alternative cover
- Collector's Edition cover

Best of Uetoaya: Single Collection is the first greatest hits album by Japanese pop singer Aya Ueto. It was released on September 20, 2006 on Flight Master.

== Background ==
Best of Uetoaya: Single Collection includes all of Ueto's previously released singles as well as one new song, "Shimokita Ijō Harajuku Miman", which is a cover of the Ueto-led TV drama Shimokita Sundays's theme song, originally performed by Fumiya Fujī. The album was released in three formats: "Collector's Edition" (limited to 10,000 copies), which comes with CD, DVD and an original wallet cord created in collaboration with Beams, "Premium Edition", which comes with CD and a DVD featuring a selection of ten music videos, and the CD-only "Standard Edition". The "Collector's Edition" sold out on the first day of release.

== Chart performance ==
Best of Uetoaya: Single Collection peaked at #2 on the Oricon Daily Albums Chart and debuted at #5 on the Weekly Albums Chart with 28,213 copies sold, becoming Ueto's first Top 10 entry in over two years and a half. The "Collector's Edition" sold out on the first day of release. The album charted for a total of eight weeks and sold over 48,000 copies.

== Track listing ==
CD
No.	Title	Lyrics	Music	Length
1.	"Pureness"	T2ya	T2ya	4:03
2.	"Kizuna"	T2ya	T2ya	4:55
3.	"Hello"	T2ya	T2ya	4:43
4.	"Message"	Yūho Iwasato	H∧L	4:20
5.	"Personal"	T2ya	T2ya	4:38
6.	"Kanshō"	Pipeline Project	Pipeline Project	4:43
7.	"Mermaid"	Pipeline Project	Pipeline Project	3:52
8.	"Binetsu"	Hiromasa Ijichi	Miki Watabe	4:02
9.	"Ai no Tame ni."	Tetsurō Oda	Oda	5:04
10.	"Kaze"	Yoshiko Miura	Oda	3:06
11.	"Okuru Kotoba"	Tetsuya Takeda	Kazuomi Chiba	4:30
12.	"Afuresō na Ai, Daite"	Miura	Oda	4:50
13.	"Namida wo Fuite (O.S.C. Mix)"	Tadashi Hirosawa	Sin	3:10
14.	"Usotsuki"	Nori, Oda	Oda	4:38
15.	"Yume no Chikara"	Toshihiko Takamizawa	Takamizawa	4:44
16.	"Kaze wo Ukete"	Ryoji	Ryoji	5:04
17.	"Egao no Mama de"	Ryoji	Ryoji	5:13
18.	"Shimokita Ijō Harajuku Miman" (下北以上 原宿未満 After Shimokita, Before Harajuku)	Fumiya Fujī	Fujī	3:46
Total length:				79:59

DVD
No.	Title	Length
1.	"Pureness" (Music Clip)
2.	"Hello" (Music Clip)
3.	"Message" (Music Clip)
4.	"Kanshō" (Music Clip)
5.	"Binetsu" (Music Clip)
6.	"Ai no Tame ni." (Music Clip)
7.	"Afuresō na Ai, Daite" (Music Clip)
8.	"Yume no Chikara" (Music Clip)
9.	"Egao no Mama de" (Music Clip)
10.	"Shimokita Ijō Harajuku Miman" (Music Clip)
11.	"Ueto Aya Discography"

== Charts and sales ==
Chart (2006)	Peak position	Sales
Japan Oricon Daily Albums Chart	2	48,073
Japan Oricon Weekly Albums Chart	5	48,073
Japan Oricon Monthly Albums Chart	19	48,073
Japan SoundScan Albums Chart	14	48,073
Taiwan Five Music J-pop/K-pop Chart	9	
Taiwan G-Music J-pop Chart	4	
