= Uetoayamix =

Remix album by Aya Ueto
- Released: August 24, 2005
- Recorded: 2002–2005
- Genre: Pop, dance, house, jazz house, reggae
- Length: 44:11
- Label: Flight Master
- Producer: Gorō Kumagai

Aya Ueto chronology
Re. (2004)	Uetoayamix (2005)	License (2006)

Uetoayamix is a remix album by Japanese pop singer Aya Ueto. It was released on August 24, 2005, on Flight Master.

== Background ==
The album was initially scheduled for release on March 2, 2005, but was eventually postponed. The original plans to include a bonus DVD and 20-page booklet were also scrapped. Two remixes found on the early track listing, "Pureness (Next Evidence Mix)" and "Namida wo Fuite (Steph Pockets Mix)" also went unreleased.

== Chart performance ==
Uetoayamix peaked at #30 on the Oricon Daily Albums Chart and debuted at #47 on the Weekly Albums Chart with 5,980 copies sold. The album charted for a total of two weeks and sold over 7,000 copies.

== Track listing ==
No.	Title	Remixer(s)	Length
1.	"Afuresō na Ai, Daite (DJ Tasaka Remix)"	DJ Tasaka	5:43
2.	"Ai no Tame ni. (Cloudberry Jam Remix)"	Cloudberry Jam	4:00
3.	"Kaze (Home Grown Remix)"	Home Grown	3:22
4.	"Hello (Reggae Disco Rockers Remix)"	Reggae Disco Rockers	5:11
5.	"Usotsuki (Jazztronik Remix)"	Jazztronik	5:35
6.	"Message (Incognito Remix)"	Incognito	5:52
7.	"Binetsu (DJ Watarai Remix)"	DJ Watarai	3:54
8.	"Ano Hito ni Aitai (Towa Tei Remix)" (あの人に会いたい I Want to See that Person)	Towa Tei	4:45
9.	"Ai no Tame ni. (Kreva Remix)"	Kreva	5:22
Total length:			44:11

== Charts and sales ==
Chart (2005)	Peak position	Sales
Japan Oricon Daily Albums Chart	30	7,173
Japan Oricon Weekly Albums Chart	47	7,173
