= Smile for.../Mō Ichido Dake =

Single by Aya Ueto

from the album Happy Magic: Smile Project
- Released: June 24, 2009
- Recorded: February 2009
- Genre: Pop
- Length: 5:40 ("Smile for..."); 5:12 ("Mō Ichido Dake")
- Label: Pony Canyon
- Songwriter(s): Kohmi Hirose, Ryoji, Naoki-T
- Producer(s): Hirose, Ryoji

Aya Ueto singles chronology
"Namida no Niji/Save Me" (2007)	"Smile for.../Mō Ichido Dake" (2009)

Alternative covers
- Cover artwork for the limited edition

Alternative cover
- Cover artwork for the "Reborn!" edition

"Smile for.../Mō Ichido Dake" (Smile for.../もう一度だけ, lit. "Smile for.../Just once more") is the sixteenth single by Japanese recording artist Aya Ueto. It was released on June 24, 2009, as the lead single from Ueto's fifth studio album Happy Magic: Smile Project. The single was issued in three formats: the limited edition, which includes a bonus DVD, "Reborn!" edition, which comes with a Katekyō Hitman Reborn! cover artwork, and standard CD-only edition.

== Overview ==
After the release of "Namida no Niji/Save Me," Ueto took a hiatus from her music to focus on her acting career. News of a new single first surfaced online after musician Akinori Yamada blogged about his recording session with Ueto. Her name was quickly edited out of the comment due to the secretive nature of the project. "Smile for.../Mō Ichido Dake" is Ueto's first single in over two years and her sixth double A-side single. It was released as part of the Smile Project 2009, the working title for Ueto's concept album Happy Magic: Smile Project.

"Smile for..."
A 30-second sample of "Smile for...."

"Mō Ichido Dake"
A 30-second sample of "Mō Ichido Dake."

"Smile for...," was written, composed, and produced by singer-songwriter Kohmi Hirose. It served as ending theme for the TV Tokyo anime Katekyō Hitman Reborn!, from episode 127 to episode 139, which aired from April 4 to June 27, 2009. The song was made available in Chaku-Uta ringtone format on April 1, 2009. "Mō Ichido Dake" was composed by Ketsumeishi member, Ryoji. The song marked her fourth collaboration with Ryoji, who also composed her single "Kaze o Ukete," and its B-side "Yakusoku no Basho," and "Egao no Mama de." It served as ending theme for the TV Asahi late-night program Ren'ai Hyakkei. Its Chaku-Uta ringtone was released on May 8, 2009.

"Smile for..." was initially announced as the sole A-side, however a few weeks later Ueto's label revealed it would be released as a double A-side single, with "Mō Ichido Dake." The single was initially scheduled to be released on June 3, 2009, however, on May 16, 2009, it was announced on Ueto's official website that, due to manufacturing issues, the release would be postponed three weeks to June 24, 2009.

"Smile for...," was recorded on February 4, 2009, and released as the first release from the Smile Project 2009, a "music collection intended to bring smiles to faces across Japan." Hirose, who also blogged about working with Ueto, commented about their collaboration a press release:

Ueto sings with that famous bright smile of hers! With her smile being the seed, may the flower that will bloom in the listener's heart heal their loneliness and sadness. Before we know it, the "Ueto Smile" will have spread to everyone's faces.

== Chart performance ==
"Smile for.../Mō Ichido Dake" debuted on the Oricon Daily Singles chart at number 9 on June 22, 2009, and climbed to number 8 the following day. It peaked at number 10 on the Oricon Weekly Singles chart, with 8,854 copies sold in its first week, making it Ueto's first single in four years, and tenth overall, to enter the top ten, since "Yume no Chikara" (2005). The single charted for five weeks and has sold a total of 13,368 copies.

== Track listing ==
No.	Title	Lyrics	Music	Arranger(s)	Length
1.	"Smile for..."	Kohmi Hirose	Hirose	Yoshimasa Inoue	5:40
2.	"Mō Ichido Dake" (もう一度だけ "Once Again")	Ryoji	Ryoji, Naoki-T	Naoki-T	5:12
3.	"Smile for... (Instrumental)"		Hirose	Inoue	5:40
4.	"Mō Ichido Dake (Instrumental)"		Ryoji, Naoki-T	Naoki-T	5:09
Total length:					21:41

Limited edition DVD
No.	Title	Length
1.	"Smile for... (Aya's Smile)" (Music Video)
2.	"Katekyō Hitman Reborn! (Special Clip)"

== Charts ==
Chart (2009)	Peak position
Billboard Japan Hot 100	33
Billboard Japan Hot Singles Sales	11
Oricon Daily Singles	8
Oricon Weekly Singles	10
Oricon Monthly Singles	38
Oricon Yearly Singles	485
