= Usotsuki (Aya Ueto song) =

Single by Aya Ueto

from the album Re.
- Released: November 17, 2004
- Recorded: 2004
- Genre: Pop, folk
- Length: 4:46
- Label: Flight Master
- Songwriter(s): Tetsurō Oda, Nori
- Producer(s): Oda

Aya Ueto singles chronology
| "Afuresō na Ai, Daite/Namida o Fuite" (2004) | "Usotsuki" (2004) | "Yume no Chikara" (2005) |

Alternative cover
- Cover artwork for the limited edition

"Usotsuki" (ウソツキ, lit. "Liar") is the tenth single by Japanese recording artist Aya Ueto. It was released on November 17, 2004, as the third and final single from Ueto's third studio album Re.. "Usotsuki" was initially scheduled to be released on October 27, 2004, but was eventually postponed for three weeks. The single was released in two formats: the limited edition, which includes a bonus DVD featuring the music video for "Usotsuki," and standard CD-only edition.

== Overview ==
"Usotsuki"
A 30-second sample of the first chorus of "Usotsuki."

"Usotsuki" is Ueto's first single without a tie-in since "Binetsu" (2003). The title track was written and produced by singer-songwriter Tetsurō Oda, marking their fourth consecutive collaboration. The song speaks about honesty in a relationship, and how a simple lie can change everything. CDJournal described "Usotsuki" as a "bittersweet folk-pop song that pulls at the heartstrings of Japanese people." "Usotsuki" marks Ueto's return to a darker image, reminiscent of her first two singles "Pureness" and "Kizuna".

The single also includes a remixed version of "Ano Hito ni Aitai," the song used in Oronamin C commercial series, starring Ueto herself, and an acoustic version of "Kaze".

== Chart performance ==
"Usotsuki" debuted on the Oricon Daily Singles chart at number 11 on November 16, 2004, and climbed to number 10 the following day. It peaked at number 12 on the Oricon Weekly Singles chart, with 19,015 copies sold in its first week. The single charted for five weeks and has sold a total of 26,386 copies.

== Track listing ==
| No. | Title | Lyrics | Music | Arranger(s) | Length |
|---|---|---|---|---|---|
| 1. | "Usotsuki" (ウソツキ "Liar") | Tetsurō Oda, Nori | Oda | Oda, Naoya Osada | 4:46 |
| 2. | "Ano Hito ni Aitai (Hatsu Ratsū Style)" (あの人に会いたい ～hatsu ratsuu style～ "I Miss Him (Full-of-Vigor Style)") | Shinji Araki | Jun Kawanishi, Kanō Kawashima | Koma2Kaz | 3:51 |
| 3. | "Kaze (Kitakaze Version)" (風 ～北風バージョン～ "Wind (North Wind Version)") | Yoshiko Miura | Oda | Osada | 3:38 |
| 4. | "Usotsuki (Instrumental)" | | Oda | Oda, Osada | 4:44 |
| Total length: | | | | | 16:59 |

Limited edition DVD
| No. | Title | Length |
|---|---|---|
| 1. | "Usotsuki (Video Clip)" |

== Charts ==
| Chart (2004) | Peak position |
|---|---|
| Oricon Daily Singles | 10 |
| Oricon Weekly Singles | 12 |
| SoundScan Japan Weekly Singles (loimited edition) | 15 |

== Release history ==
| Region | Date | Format | Label |
|---|---|---|---|
| Japan | November 17, 2004 | CD, CD+DVD | Pony Canyon |
| Taiwan | November 19, 2004 | CD | Pony Canyon |
