= License (disambiguation) =

License or licence is a legal concept.

It may also refer to:

- License (album), 2006 album by Aya Ueto
- License (film), 2023 Indian film
- Tom Licence (PhD 2006), British historian
