= Ri Kōran (film) =

- Genre: Biographical film
- Created by: Osamu Ogawa
- Based on: Ri Kōran wo Ikite: Watashi no Rirekisho by Yoshiko Yamaguchi (Nikkei Inc., 2004)
- Written by: You Takeyama
- Directed by: Tonko Horikawa
- Starring: Aya Ueto
- Composer: Takayuki Hattori
- Country of origin: Japan
- Original languages: Japanese; Chinese
- No. of episodes: 2

Production
- Executive producer: Osamu Ogawa
- Producers: Kaori Hashimoto; Norikazu Tsubaki; Masanori Tano
- Camera setup: Multiple-camera setup

Original release
- Network: TV Tokyo
- Release: February 11 – February 12, 2007

Ri Kōran (Japanese: 李香蘭, Hepburn: Ri Kōran) is a 2007 Japanese two-part historical and biographical film portraying the turbulent life and times of legendary singer and actress Yoshiko Yamaguchi, known as Ri Kōran in her prime. A tragic figure pitted into the limelight of fame by the unpredictable forces of history, she was caught between competing nationalisms and political conflicts, her life and career sculpted by the turbulence of war and global power shifts. Loosely based on Yamaguchi's memoir Ri Kōran wo Ikite: Watashi no Rirekisho, the two-episode film production was directed by Tonko Horikawa and starred Aya Ueto as Yamaguchi, first broadcasting in Japan by TV Tokyo on February 11 and 12, 2007. Subtitled versions were subsequently made available online to pan-Asian audiences on major Asian video sharing platforms.

== Plot ==
The film follows Yoshiko Yamaguchi's life from childhood to adulthood, portraying her tragic identity crisis and internal cross-cultural conflict. Born in 1920 to well-educated Japanese expatriates in increasingly Japanese-dominated northeastern China, she was raised in a multi-ethnic, transnational social circle consisting of various Chinese, Japanese and European acquaintances, many of whom hail from an intellectual or artistic background. The film details her friendship with Lyuba Monosova Gurinets, the daughter of a Russian aristocratic family exiled by the 1917 Revolution and learned music from Italian soprano Madam Podresov, who was married into exiled Russian aristocracy.

Yoshiko's father Fumio was an expert in Chinese history and literature, and belonged to a group of transnational Japanese intellectuals who wanted to build a pan-Asian utopia through Sino-Japanese cooperation. While her family was very fond and close to Chinese culture, as a child, she witnesses the brutalities of Japanese colonialism and imperialism against Chinese people firsthand, epitomized in a violent scene where her Chinese neighbor was tied to a tree and bloodily beaten by Japanese soldiers for suspected anti-Japanese activities. These traumatic episodes cause her to internalize her Japanese heritage as a marker of oppression, inducing guilt in the young child.

In 1931, Japan invades northeastern China and establishes the pro-Japanese puppet state Manchukuo. At this time, Yoshiko was enrolled in a Beijing high school under the Chinese name Pan Shuhua, and was assumed to be Chinese by most of her peers. At a student gathering passionately denouncing Japanese aggression, Shuhua was asked what she would do if Japanese troops reached Beijing. She replies, "I want to stand atop Beijing's city walls and have bullets pierce through my body." Her classmates enthusiastically applaud her, assuming she meant she would use her own body to defend Beijing against Japanese invasion. However, as visually represented through a fiery dream sequence where Chinese and Japanese bullets shatter her from both sides, she was really expressing her helplessness in being caught in the crossfires of two nations she loved dearly.

As she blossoms into a beautiful young lady, the Manchukuo Film Association, or Man'ei for short, recruits her, and she swiftly rises to fame as a popular singer and film actress. She uses "Li Xianglan" as her stage name during the Manchukuo era. However, in that highly politicized era, becoming a pop cultural icon entailed becoming a propaganda tool for powerful forces beyond her control. Li stars in many Man'ei films that promoted Manchukuo's official ideology and multiethnic unity policy. Her rise to fame is one of the most successful projects that sought to embody the theme of ethnic harmony in Man'ei films. She represents the pan-Asian imaginary rather than a fixed singular ethnic figure, typically involving a non-Japanese female character falling in love with a Japanese male. She is named the "Goodwill Ambassador for Manchukuo-Japanese Friendship," a title she cherished and truly believed in. However, even as a renowned celebrity, she faces racism; on a trip to Japan, Li is dressed in a qipao and is stopped by a Japanese soldier. Upon checking her papers, the soldier angrily reprimands and insults her, shouting that a superior Japanese should not wear the fashion of the inferior races. These episodes slowly make Li realize the hypocrisy of the official rhetoric, and she feels guilty of representing propaganda characters.

The war draws to a close with Japan's defeat and the collapse of Manchukuo. Despite having faced racial discrimination on her trip to Japan, Li is arrested in Shanghai and charged with treason against China. As tensions rise between the Kuomintang and the Communists, she is scheduled to be put to death by firing squad. Dissatisfied with their daughter's upcoming execution, Li's parents (at the time both under arrest in Beijing) decide to produce a copy of her birth certificate and have Lyuba smuggle it into Shanghai. After the Chinese authorities discover her true identity, all treason charges are dismissed and she is immediately repatriated to Japan. The film then fast forwards to the late 1990s, as Sino-Japanese relations normalized, and Li, by then Yoshiko Otaka (acquired through her marriage to diplomat Hiroshi Otaka), is able to revisit the land of her childhood. In a cemetery, she runs into Lyuba and the film closes with the two having an emotional reunion.

== Cast ==
- Aya Ueto as Yoshiko Yamaguchi
- Isao Hashizume as Fumio Yamaguchi, Yoshiko's father
- Yuko Natori as Ai Yamaguchi, Yoshiko's mother
- Rei Kikukawa as Yoshiko Kawashima
- Shido Nakamura as Masahiko Amakasu
- Ikki Sawamura as Nagamasa Kawakita
- Yukiyoshi Ozawa as Hidemi Kodama
- Takehiko Ono as Toru Yamaga
- Fukusuke Nakamura as Kazuo Hasegawa
- Akio Kaneda as Keizo Azuma
- Shinobu Tsuruta as Tomu Uchida
- Ken Nishida as Lt. Gen. Yasunao Yoshioka
- Megumi Nakayama as Chen Yunshang
- Yoichiro Saito as Taijiro Tamura
- Motoki Fukami as Kenichiro Matsuoka
- Tamotsu Ishibashi as Hisamitsu Noguchi
- Koyo Maeda as Ryoichi Hattori
- Shinobu Kawamata as Masako Atsumi
- Yoshiko Noda as Kashiko Kawakita
- Shinya Honda as Kyuichi Tsuji
- Ryota Yoshimitsu as Takashi Koide
- Satoru Saito as Minoru Yamanashi
- Yuu Tokui as Mitsuo Makino
- Kazuyuki Matsuzawa as Shinji Ueno
- Masayuki Suzuki as Kunio Watanabe
- Toshiki Ayata as Police Capt. Kanazawa
- Hideaki Ishii as Kanichi Negishi
- Bunta Saito as Sentaro Ikeda
- Shusho Taguchi as Masao Kume
- Ayame Koike as Young Yoshiko
- Yōko Nogiwa as Narrator / Present-day Yoshiko
- Wang Weihua as Emperor Puyi
- Li Lin as Empress Wanrong
- Feng Minmin as Miss Liu
- Yao Keqin as Li Jichun
- Wang Min as Pan Yugui
- Lu Xiaolin as Wen Guihua
- Lu Yijun as Meng Hong

== Reception ==
The film received TV Tokyo's average viewership rates of 9.1% for Ep. 1 and 8.5% for Ep. 2
