= Sumika Yamamoto =

Japanese manga artist

Sumika Yamamoto 山本鈴美香
- Born: July 17, 1949 (age 77) Enzan, Yamanashi, Japan
- Areas: Writer, Penciller, Inker
- Notable works: Ace o Nerae!

Sumika Yamamoto (山本 鈴美香, Yamamoto Sumika) is a Japanese manga artist known for her manga series Ace o Nerae!.

== Biography ==
Sumika Yamamoto is a shōjo manga artist born on June 17, 1949. She debuted as a manga artist in 1971 with Sono Hitokoto ga ienakute in the manga magazine Margaret before achieving success with Ace o Nerae. In 1981, she moved back to her home town Enzan and stopped her artistic output in order to cultivate spirituality.

== Manga works ==
- "Sono Hitokoto ga ienakute" ("Without saying that very single word", 1971)
- "Ace o Nerae!" ("Aim for the ace!", Margaret 1972–1975, 1978–1980)
- "Kiss ni Goyoujin" ("With a kiss", Margaret, 1973)
- "Nanatsu no Eldorado" ("The seven Eldorados", Margaret, 1975–1977)
- "Hikkuri kaetta omocha bako" ("The toy that tumbled down", Margaret, 1978)
- "H2O! Zendai mimon!" ("H2O! Unprecedent!", Margaret, 1979)
- "Ai no Ogonritsu" (Shogakukan Lady Comics, 1 volume, 1983)
- "Hakuran Seifuu" ("Cool breeze of knowledge", issues 15, 17 to 22 of Petit Flower 1983–1984)
- "Hayami Daisuke Funsenki" ("The fighter Hayami Daisuke", issue 16 of Petit Flower, 2 volumes, 1983)
- "Koi Shichaou kana?" ("Love alphabet?", Margaret, 1 volume, 1972)
