= Aim for the Ace! =

Manga and anime series

- Cover of the first manga volume, released by Shueisha on September 20, 1973

エースをねらえ! (Ēsu o Nerae!)
- Genre: Romance, sports
- Manga
- Written by: Sumika Yamamoto
- Published by: Shueisha
- Magazine: Margaret
- Original run: January 1973 – February 1980
- Volumes: 18
- Anime television series
- Directed by: Osamu Dezaki
- Music by: Goh Misawa
- Studio: A-Production; Tokyo Movie
- Licensed by: NA: Discotek Media
- Original network: ANN (MBS)
- Original run: October 5, 1973 – March 29, 1974
- Episodes: 26
- Anime television series

Shin Ace o Nerae!
- Directed by: Minoru Okazaki
- Music by: Kōji Makaino
- Studio: Tokyo Movie Shinsha
- Licensed by: NA: Discotek Media
- Original network: NNS (NTV)
- Original run: October 14, 1978 – March 31, 1979
- Episodes: 25
- Anime film
- Directed by: Osamu Dezaki
- Produced by: Yutaka Fujioka
- Written by: Keisuke Fujikawa
- Music by: Kōji Makaino
- Studio: Tokyo Movie Shinsha
- Licensed by: NA: Discotek Media
- Released: September 8, 1979
- Runtime: 88 minutes
- Original video animation

Ace o Nerae! 2
- Directed by: Noboru Furuse (Osamu Dezaki "Total Supervisor")
- Written by: Makiko Mikami; Megumi Hiyoshi
- Music by: Hiroaki Serizawa
- Studio: Tokyo Movie Shinsha
- Licensed by: NA: Discotek Media
- Released: July 25, 1988 – October 25, 1988
- Episodes: 13
- Original video animation

Ace o Nerae! Final Stage
- Directed by: Osamu Dezaki
- Written by: Masami Mori; Rika Kaidō
- Music by: Hiroaki Serizawa
- Studio: TMS Entertainment
- Released: October 23, 1989 – April 24, 1990
- Episodes: 12
- Television drama
- Directed by: Hidetomo Matsuda; Shunji Muguruma; Yoshinori Kobayashi
- Written by: Akiyo Takigawa; Hiroko Kanasugi; Naoya Takayama
- Music by: Norihito Sumitomo
- Original network: TV Asahi
- Original run: January 15, 2004 – March 11, 2004
- Episodes: 9 + 1 special episode

Aim for the Ace!, known in Japan as Ace o Nerae! (Japanese: エースをねらえ!, Hepburn: Ēsu o Nerae!), is a manga series written and illustrated by Sumika Yamamoto. The series tells the story of Hiromi Oka, a high school student who wants to become a professional tennis player as she struggles against mental weakness, anxiety and thwarted love. It was originally serialized in Shueisha's shōjo magazine Margaret from January 1973 to February 1980. Later, Shueisha collected the chapters and published them in 18 tankōbon volumes.

The manga was adapted into an anime television series in 1973 by Tokyo Movie which was originally broadcast on Mainichi Broadcasting System (MBS) between 1973 and 1974. Aim for the Ace! also spawned another anime television and an anime film between 1978 and 1979, two original video animations (OVA) between 1988 and 1990, a live-action Japanese television drama in 2004, and many types of Aim for the Ace!-related merchandise. The franchise is also known by its international title Aim for the Best!

The series is one of the best-selling shōjo manga series of all time, having sold approximately 15 million copies in Japan. It has been also popular among anime viewers, and become a hit in Japan, even among its non-target audience. It is considered a classic by anime and manga critics and has been influential in the anime industry.

== Plot ==
The story is about Hiromi Oka (岡ひろみ, Oka Hiromi), a high school girl who struggles to become good at tennis. While attending Nishi (西高), Hiromi begins playing tennis after becoming fascinated by Reika Ryūzaki (竜崎麗香, Ryūzaki Reika), an older girl who is the best player on the team and is nicknamed "Madame Butterfly" (お蝶夫人, Ochōfujin) owing to her grace on the tennis court. The team gets a new coach, Jin Munakata (宗方仁, Munakata Jin), who sees potential in Hiromi and trains her to become a great tennis player.

Hiromi struggles to overcome her mental weakness. Later, she falls in love with another tennis player, Takayuki Tōdō (藤堂貴之, Tōdō Takayuki), but coach Munakata tells her not to get too involved and that she should forget him and work on her tennis skills. Hiromi often loses confidence in her playing abilities, but with the support of her coach and her friends she overcomes her anxiety. By training herself to become a better player, Hiromi grows into a mentally stronger person. Her enthusiasm, her love of tennis and the support from people around her helps her to become one of the best players in the world.

== Publication ==
Aim for the Ace! was written and illustrated by Sumika Yamamoto; its first chapter was published by Shueisha in the Japanese magazine Margaret in January 1973. Its serialization finished in 1975, but because of demand from readers, partly brought about by the phenomenal success of the anime in reruns, its publication restarted from 1978 to February 1980. Its first tankōbon (collected volume) was released by Shueisha on September 20, 1973, and the eighteenth and last one was released on June 30, 1980. Shueisha reprinted the series from December 31, 1978, to August 25, 1981.

A five-volume light novel was published by Shueisha under its Cobalt imprint from August 1983 and October 1984. The original manga was republished in bunkoban format twice; Chuokoron-Shinsha released it from October 18, 1994, to April 18, 1995, in fourteen volumes, and Shueisha released it between June 18, 2002, and October 18, 2002, in ten volumes. The series has been localized in Italy by Panini Comics and published under its Planet Manga line.

== Anime adaptations ==
=== Television series ===
The first anime television series based on Aim for the Ace! was produced by Tokyo Movie and animated by A-Production. It was originally broadcast between October 5, 1973, and March 29, 1974, by Mainichi Broadcasting System (MBS). Osamu Dezaki served as the general director of all 26 episodes. It was dubbed into French, Spanish and Italian. Due to its initial poor ratings in Japan, the series was cancelled with half the original intended number of episodes. However, a few years later with high ratings in reruns of the series, a remake was announced. The second anime series was also produced by Tokyo Movie and was directed by Minoru Okazaki. Titled Aim for the Ace! New Version (新・エースをねらえ！, Shin Ēsu o Nerae!), it was broadcast by Nippon Television from October 14, 1978, to March 31, 1979.

The episodes of the first series were released in two DVD box set by Bandai Visual on May 25, 2001, and August 25, 2001. Bandai Visual re-released the series between January 28, 2005, and February 24, 2005, in six DVD compilations. On January 20, 2012, Avex published a four-disc DVD box set containing the entire series. In France, Manga Distribution released the complete series into a DVD box set in 2006. Two DVD box sets containing all 25 episodes of the second series were released by Bandai Visual on March 25, 2002, and June 25, 2002. Nippon Columbia published the entire series in a single DVD box set; first on May 23, 2007, and again on January 21, 2009.

=== Film ===
A 24-minute animated short film titled Ace o Nerae! Tenis Ōkoku no Cinderella (テニス王国のシンデレラ) that was derived from television series was distributed theatrically by Toho in Japan on December 20, 1973.

With the popularity of Shin Ace o Nerae!, the studio decided to produce an anime film adaptation. The film was directed by Osamu Dezaki, written by Keisuke Fujikawa, music by Kōji Makaino, and produced by Yutaka Fujioka. In addition to the original incidental music newly composed for the movie version, many insert songs and BGM are recycled from the second series, which was also scored by Makaino. It was produced at Tokyo Movie and was released by Toho in Japanese theaters on September 8, 1979. It was published in DVD format by Bandai Visual on November 25, 2001, and on March 27, 2005. In April 2008, Banda Visual announced they planned to release the film on Blu-ray format; it was released on September 26, 2008, and re-released on July 22, 2016.

=== Original video animations ===
To serve as sequels to the anime series and to conclude the manga story, two original video animations (OVA) were produced. The first OVA, Ace o Nerae! 2 (エースをねらえ! 2, Ēsu o Nerae! 2), which consists of thirteen episodes, was produced by Tokyo Movie and directed by Noboru Furuse, with "Total Supervisor" credit given to Osamu Dezaki, who also storyboarded four episodes. It was released by Bandai Visual between July 25, 1988, and October 25, 1988, on six VHS videocassettes, and as a DVD compilation on May 23, 2005. It was also released in France by Manga Distribution in 2008. The first OVA was followed by Ace o Nerae! Final Stage (エースをねらえ! ファイナルステージ, Ēsu o Nerae! Fainaru Sutēji), which consists of 12 episodes directed by Osamu Dezaki. It was originally released by Bandai Visual into six VHS videos from October 23, 1989, to April 24, 1990, and a DVD box set was released on September 26, 2003.

=== Audio ===
Both the opening theme song, "Ace o Nerae!", and the ending theme song, "Shiroi Tennis Court" (白いテニスコート), from the original anime series were performed by Kumiko Ōsugi. VIP performs "Seishun ni Kakero!" (青春にかけろ) and "Ashita ni Mukatte" (明日に向かって), the opening and ending theme from Shin Ace o Nerae!. The film only used an opening theme, "Mabushī Kisetsu ni" (まぶしい季節に) by Shōnen Tanteidan. Hiroko Moriguchi sang Ace o Nerae! 2's theme, "Endless Dream" (エンドレス・ドリーム, Endoresu Dorīmu), as well as "Never Say Goodbye", Final Stage's theme. On January 9, 1993, King Records released a CD containing the soundtracks from both anime television series, the anime film, and the first OVA. The soundtrack of the first television series was released on March 6, 1996, by EMI Music Japan. Soundtrack Laboratory under its Soundtrack Pub label published an Ace o Nerae!: Original Soundtrack on March 7, 2013. Subsequently, it published the official soundtrack for Shin Ace o Nerae! on two CDs on July 31, 2013, and December 25, 2013.

== Reception and legacy ==
The manga was a hit, having sold approximately 15 million copies, which makes it one of the best-selling shōjo manga series of all time. Although the television series initially received low ratings, reruns were more positively received by fans, as well as the second series. The anime is considered a hit on Japanese television and though aimed toward schoolgirls it was popular among people of both sexes, and was also popular in Europe. In 2001, the anime magazine Animage ranked the 1979 anime television as the twenty-second of the Top 100 anime productions of all time. In 2005, TV Asahi conducted a "Top 100" online web poll and nationwide survey asking viewers for the best anime television series; Aim for the Ace! was placed fourteenth in the online poll and thirty-fourth in the survey. Responsible for a tennis boom among high school students in the 1970s, the series was still popular as of 2015 appearing in several online web polls of most influential sports anime. On TV Asahi's Manga Sōsenkyo 2021 poll, in which 150.000 people voted for their top 100 manga series, Aim for the Ace! ranked 44th.

Considered a classic, the series has been influential in Japan both in fiction and in real life. In addition to being a landmark in the sports genre and an inspiration for other sports anime, it has set many of the conventions of yuri. Its story has been imitated by other anime to the point that it became a cliché; it established the tradition of "the klutzy wallflower with hidden potential, the rich bitch who wants all the attention, and a handsome Coach with a tragic fate" in the words of anime critic Jonathan Clements. Gainax's science fiction OVA Gunbuster incorporated the set-up and the style of Aim for the Ace!, acting as parody to the series. Anime series Oh! Super Milk-chan's opening theme also included parodies of the anime. Anime director Kenji Kamiyama, most known for the Ghost in the Shell: Stand Alone Complex series, cited the series among the 15 best anime of all time. Shuzo Matsuoka, considered "the first successful Japanese [tennis] player", was influenced to play because of the esteem he had on the series.

Justin Sevakis, writing for Anime News Network, and Erica Friedman, founder of Yuricon, consider the series a "true" shōjo. Friedman wrote, "As a representative of early shoujoai, Ace wo Nerae is a spectacular example, but expect a fair dollop of cheesy-ness, as the character designs, music, art, etc are all over 30 years old. The op art graphics and laughable opening theme are delightfully retro now. The most important thing is that the characters are genuinely likeable and their motivations fathomable." Sevakis praised the story as having "purity", as "There are no manufactured obstacles to overcome." He also declared, "Despite being Western-looking and ostensibly about universally accessible sport of tennis, it's a fascinating look at Japanese personal motivation, interaction and decorum," playing "like a catalog of Japan's most interesting cultural quirks." Art-wise it was compared to Dear Brother and The Rose of Versailles by Anime News Network's Lynzee Loveridge, who said it "reinforces a lot of the dangerous work ethic that permeates sports series, like battling through a serious injury or abandoning emotional 'dalliances' like romance."

=== Video game adaptations ===
Several games based on Aim for the Ace! have been released in Japan. Nippon Telenet adapted the series into a Super Famicom video game, which they published on December 22, 1993. Tristar published two video game adaptations for Microsoft Windows and Mac OS X; the first was released on November 30, 2002, and the second on December 3, 2004. In 2009, Olympia distributed an Ace o Nerae!-themed pachinko machine under its Gold Olympia brand. Ace Denken released a different machine in 2011.

=== Television drama ===
In November 2003, the production of a Japanese television drama series was announced. It was broadcast by Japanese network TV Asahi in nine episodes between January 15, 2004, and March 11, 2004. It was directed by Hidetomo Matsuda, Shunji Muguruma and Yoshinori Kobayashi, produced by Motohiro Matsumoto and Shizuo Sekiguchi, and the screenwriters were Akiyo Takikawa, Naoya Takayama and Hiroko Kanasugi. Shuzo Matsuoka, a former Japanese professional tennis player, served the supervisor of the tennis scenes.

The music was composed by Norihito Sumitomo; the series homonymous opening theme song is sung by Hiromi and the closing theme was "Ai no Tame ni." by Aya Ueto—who also starred in the leading role. On July 23, 2004, Geneon Universal released the series on DVD; it was available as five individual volumes or as a DVD box set. Its soundtrack was published by Nippon Columbia on September 22, 2004. Serving as a sequel to the series, a special episode was aired on September 23, 2004, and then was released on DVD on December 22 by Geneon Universal.

Out of the nine episodes, three were featured on the top ten list of the most-watched dramas in the week. The second one appeared in the eighth place with a 15.3 percent television viewership rating, the eighth episode reached the tenth place with 14.8 percent, and the last occupied the ninth spot with 14.2 percent.

== Sources ==
- Galbraith IV, Stuart (2008). The Toho Studios Story: A History and Complete Filmography. Scarecrow Press. ISBN 978-1461673743.
