= Nagareboshi (TV series) =

- Title card
- Genre: Drama
- Created by: Motoko Usuda, Ryūhei Akiyama
- Starring: Yutaka Takenouchi; Aya Ueto; Shota Matsuda; Kie Kitano; Haruna Kawaguchi; Akito Kiriyama; Tetta Sugimoto; Chisun; Shingo Nakagawa; Hiromi Kitagawa; Yuka Itaya; Mieko Harada; Goro Inagaki
- Theme music composer: Kentaro Kobuchi
- Ending theme: "Ryūsei"
- Country of origin: Japan
- Original language: Japanese
- No. of seasons: 1
- No. of episodes: 10

Production
- Executive producer: Nakano Toshiyuki
- Production locations: Kanagawa, Shizuoka, Tokyo, Yamanashi
- Running time: 47 minutes
- Production company: Fuji Television

Original release
- Network: FNS (Fuji TV)
- Release: October 18 – December 20, 2010

Nagareboshi (流れ星; En. "Shooting Star") is a Japanese television drama adapted from the Young Scenario Prize-winning screenplay Kurage Marriage by Motoko Usuda. The series aired on the Getsuku time-slot from October 18 to December 20, 2010 on Fuji TV. The drama's slogan was "Itsuwari no Ai Kara, Shinjitsu no Ai e" (偽りの愛から、真実の愛へ; "From Lie to True Love"). The series stars Yutaka Takenouchi, in his first Getsuku drama lead role in nine years, since Dekichatta Kekkon (2001), and Aya Ueto, in her second supporting role in a Getsuku drama and first since Konkatsu! (2009).

The theme song of the drama, "Ryūsei," is performed by folk rock duo Kobukuro. The series premiere, which was extended by 15 minutes, earned a rating of 13.6%.

== Series synopsis ==
Takenouchi plays an aquarium employee named Kengo, who possesses a secret he would sacrifice everything in order to protect, while Ueto portrays Risa, a young woman working in the sex trade in order to pay off her brother's debt. These two characters, both full of despair, meet each other and end up entering a contract marriage purely for its benefits. However, as they overcome various troubles, their relationship begins turning into true love.

== Cast and characters ==
=== Main cast ===
- Yutaka Takenouchi as Kengo Okada (37), an employee of the Shin-Enoshima aquarium who enters a contract marriage with Risa.
- Aya Ueto as Risa Makihara (26), a young woman working at the image club Sei Marin Gakuen under the alias Milk.
- Kie Kitano as Maria Okada (17), Kengo's younger sister and high school student who suffers from a liver illness.
- Shota Matsuda as Dr. Ryō Kamiya (28), Maria's attending physician.
- Goro Inagaki as Shuichi Makihara (35), Risa's older brother who has ruined her life for the sake of money.
- Haruna Kawaguchi as Mizuki Yasuda (17), Maria's best friend and schoolmate.
- Akito Kiriyama as Ryōta Sawamura (17), an in-patient at the same hospital as Maria who suffers from the same liver illness.
- Tetta Sugimoto as Junji Kawamoto (42), Kengo's friend and employee of the Shin-Enoshima aquarium .
- Chisun as Chizuru Kawamoto (32), an employee of the Shin-Enoshima aquarium. She is married to Junji Kawamoto.
- Shingo Nakagawa as Yūya Kashiwabara (27), an employee of the Shin-Enoshima aquarium.
- Hiromi Kitagawa as Rumi Nakashima (29), the nurse in charge of Maria and Ryōta.
- Yuka Itaya as Minako Aizawa (37), Kengo's fiancée. She works at a hotel.
- Mieko Harada as Kazuko Okada (57), Kengo and Maria's mother.

=== Recurring cast ===
- Ken Mitsuishi as Shirai, the manager of the image club Sei Marin Gakuen (episodes 1–3).
- Kazumasa Taguchi as Dr. Taninaka (episodes 1, 4, 7, 9).
- Takeru Shibuya as a child at the aquarium (episodes 1, 9).
- Saori as Kotomi Sawamura, Ryōta's sister (episodes 3, 6, 8).
- Hijiri Sakurai as a ward office clerk (episodes 3, 9).
- Natsuhi Ueno as Saeko Iwai, a tabloid reporter (episodes 7–9).

=== Guest cast ===
- Shunsuke Daito as Makoto Fujishiro, Risa's boyfriend (episode 1).
- Shihō Harumi as a customer at Sei Marin Gakuen (episode 1).
- Yuzuki Amano as a child at the aquarium (episode 1).
- Raishin Kodama as Kōhei, Kengo and Maria's uncle (episode 1).
- Hisako Matsuyama as Reiko, Kengo and Maria's aunt (episode 1).
- Kinpei Hayashiya as himself, a rakugo performer (episode 2).
- Eihei Hayashiya as himself, a rakugo performer (episode 2).
- Petako Hayashiya as herself, a rakugo performer (episode 2).
- Michiko Yamamoto as the lady at the watch shop (episode 5).
- Kaoru Sawayama as a hospital nurse (episode 5).
- Yūki Mihara as a TV presenter (episode 5).
- Shōgo Asari as Iwai's cameraman (episode 9).
- Midoriko as the Aquapet Joy shopkeeper (episode 10).
- Fuku Suzuki as a customer at Aquapet Joy (episode 10).
- Arisa Isano as a customer at Aquapet Joy (episode 10).

== Episodes and ratings ==
No.	Title	Directed by	Written by	Original release date	Rating (Kantō)
1	"My Beloved Has One Year to Live, the Love That Begins With a Contract!!" "Saiai no Hito wa Ichinen no Inochi, Konyaku Kara Hajimaru Ai!!" (最愛の人は一年の命 契約から始まる愛!!)	Rieko Miyamoto	Motoko Usuda & Ryūhei Akiyama	October 18, 2010	13.6
2	"Life-staking Emotions" "Inochigake no Omoi" (命がけの想い)	Yūsuke Ishii	Motoko Usuda & Ryūhei Akiyama	October 25, 2010	14.2
3	"Our Secret..." "Futari no Himitsu..." (二人の秘密…)	Michiko Namiki	Motoko Usuda & Ryūhei Akiyama	November 1, 2010	13.7
4	"Shocking Confession" "Shōgeki no Kokuhaku" (衝撃の告白)	Michiko Namiki	Motoko Usuda & Ryūhei Akiyama	November 8, 2010	15.0
5	"Broken Ties" "Kowareta Kizuna" (壊れた絆)	Rieko Miyamoto	Motoko Usuda & Ryūhei Akiyama	November 15, 2010	12.6
6	"Love and Death" "Ai to Shi" (愛と死)	Yūsuke Ishii	Motoko Usuda & Ryūhei Akiyama	November 22, 2010	13.9
7	"Night Between Us" "Futarikiri no Yoru" (二人きりの夜)	Michiko Namaki	Motoko Usuda & Ryūhei Akiyama	November 29, 2010	13.6
8	"The Last Night" "Saigo no Yoru" (最後の夜)	Rieko Miyamoto	Motoko Usuda & Ryūhei Akiyama	December 6, 2010	14.8
9	"Torn Bonds" "Hikisakareta Kizuna" (引き裂かれた絆)	Yūsuke Ishii	Motoko Usuda & Ryūhei Akiyama	December 13, 2010	13.4
10	"Our Decision" "Futari no Ketsudan" (二人の決断)	Rieko Miyamoto	Motoko Usuda & Ryūhei Akiyama	December 20, 2010	15.8
Average Rating (Kantō): 14.1

== Awards ==
Year	Award	Category	Nominee	Result
2011	Nikkan Sports Drama Grand Prix	Best Drama	—N/a	Nominated
2011	Nikkan Sports Drama Grand Prix	Best Lead Actor	Yutaka Takenouchi	Nominated
2011	Nikkan Sports Drama Grand Prix	Best Supporting Actor	Goro Inagaki	Nominated
2011	Nikkan Sports Drama Grand Prix	Best Supporting Actress	Aya Ueto	Won
2011	The Television Drama Academy Award	Best Supporting Actress	Aya Ueto	Won
