= Happy Magic: Smile Project =

Studio album by Aya Ueto
- Released: July 15, 2009
- Recorded: January 2009 - June 2009
- Genre: Pop
- Length: 54:52 (Standard edition); 45:48 (Limited edition)
- Label: Pony Canyon
- Producer: Mitsuyoshi Tamura, Aya Ueto

Aya Ueto chronology
Best of Uetoaya: Single Collection (2006)	Happy Magic: Smile Project (2009)

Alternative cover
- Limited edition cover

Singles from Happy Magic: Smile Project
- 1. "Way to Heaven" Released: March 14, 2007; 2. "Namida no Niji" Released: May 30, 2007; 3. "Smile for.../Mō Ichido Dake" Released: June 24, 2009

Happy Magic: Smile Project is the fifth studio album by Japanese pop singer Aya Ueto. It was released on July 15, 2009 on Pony Canyon.

== Background ==
Happy Magic: Smile Project is Ueto's first original album in over three years. It features songs written and composed by artists including Kohmi Hirose, Tortoise Matsumoto (from Ulfuls), Ryoji (from Ketsumeishi), Kiroro, Shintarō Tokita (from Sukimaswitch), and Hitomi Yaida as well as a cover of Begin's "Smile". The album was released in two formats: limited CD + DVD + photo book edition and standard CD-only edition. The standard edition features eleven tracks, including the two singles "Way to Heaven" and "Namida no Niji". These two songs are omitted from the limited edition CD, however the DVD includes their music videos. Despite "Save Me" being an A-side, it was not included in the album.

== Chart performance ==
Happy Magic: Smile Project peaked at #14 on the Oricon Daily Albums Chart and debuted at #20 on the Weekly Albums Chart with 7,648 copies sold. The album charted for a total of five weeks and sold over 11,000 copies.

== Track listing ==
CD
No.	Title	Lyrics	Music	Length
1.	"Smile for..."	Kohmi Hirose	Kohmi Hirose	5:36
2.	"Tsukamaete!" (つかまえて! Catch Me!)	Hitomi Yaida	Katsumi Ohnishi	4:21
3.	"Kokoro Poka Poka" (心ぽかぽか Warm Heart)	Chihiro Tamashiro	Ayano Kinjō	4:25
4.	"Kimi ga Warau to Sekai ga Warau" (君が笑うと世界が笑う When You Smile, the World Smiles With You)	Kinjō	Tamashiro	5:42
5.	"Honey"	Tortoise Matsumoto	Matsumoto	4:30
6.	"Watashi no Taiyō" (私の太陽 My Sun)	Lisa Halim	Satomi Ishige	4:55
7.	"Migimune Fearī" (右胸のフェアリー Right Chest Fairy)	Shintarō Tokita	Tokita	5:03
8.	"Smile"	Begin	Begin	4:30
9.	"Bokura no Mirai e" (僕らの未来へ To Our Future)	Ryoji	Ryoji, Naoki-T	6:27
10.	"Way to Heaven" (Standard edition bonus track)	Shoko	Shōichirō Hirota	4:34
11.	"Namida no Niji" (Standard edition bonus track)	Aya Ueto, Izumi Sakai	Yoo	4:22
Total length:				54:52

DVD
No.	Title	Length
1.	"Way to Heaven" (Music Video)
2.	"Namida no Niji" (Music Video)

== Charts and sales ==
Chart (2009)	Peak position	Sales
Japan Oricon Daily Albums Chart	14	11,345
Japan Oricon Weekly Albums Chart	20	11,345
Taiwan Five Music J-pop/K-pop Chart	12	
Taiwan G-Music J-pop Chart	18	
