= Ayaueto =

Studio album by Aya Ueto
- Released: March 12, 2003
- Recorded: 2002–2003
- Genres: Pop, pop rock
- Length: 57:20
- Label: Flight Master
- Producer: Gorō Kumagai

Aya Ueto chronology
Ayaueto (2003)	Message (2004)

Singles from Ayaueto
- 1. "Pureness" Released: August 28, 2002; 2. "Kizuna" Released: November 7, 2002; 3. "Hello" Released: February 26, 2003

Ayaueto is the debut studio album by Japanese pop singer Aya Ueto. It was released on March 12, 2003 on Flight Master.

== Chart performance ==
Ayaueto peaked at #4 on the Oricon Daily Albums Chart and debuted at #5 on the Weekly Albums Chart with 28,707 copies sold. The album charted for a total of thirteen weeks and sold over 54,000 copies.

== Track listing ==
No.	Title	Lyrics	Music	Length
1.	"Pureness"	T2ya	T2ya	4:03
2.	"Ambition"	T2ya	T2ya	4:18
3.	"Hello (Album Version)"	T2ya	T2ya	4:46
4.	"Puzzle"	Natsumi Kobayashi	Shinichirō Murayama	3:38
5.	"Flower"	Naho Tanaka	H-Wonder	4:23
6.	"Pieces"	Mizue	Shinya Sumida	4:40
7.	"Lie"	Kobayashi	Yasuaki Maejima	4:31
8.	"Distance"	Mizue	Keiji Tanabe	4:09
9.	"Where is Love?"	Kosuke Morimoto	Morimoto	3:24
10.	"Kizuna"	T2ya	T2ya	4:55
11.	"True Love"	Naoto Suzuki	Suzuki	3:56
12.	"Dreamin'"	Nao Asada	Nao Asada	3:47
13.	"Hello (NeoVerse & DJ Who Nu Anime Club Mix)"	T2ya	T2ya	6:16
Total length:				57:20

== Charts and sales ==
Chart (2003)	Peak position	Sales
Japan Oricon Daily Albums Chart	4	54,364
Japan Oricon Weekly Albums Chart	5	54,364
Japan SoundScan Albums Chart	8	54,364
