= Yutaka Takenouchi =

Japanese actor (born 1971)

- 竹野内 豊
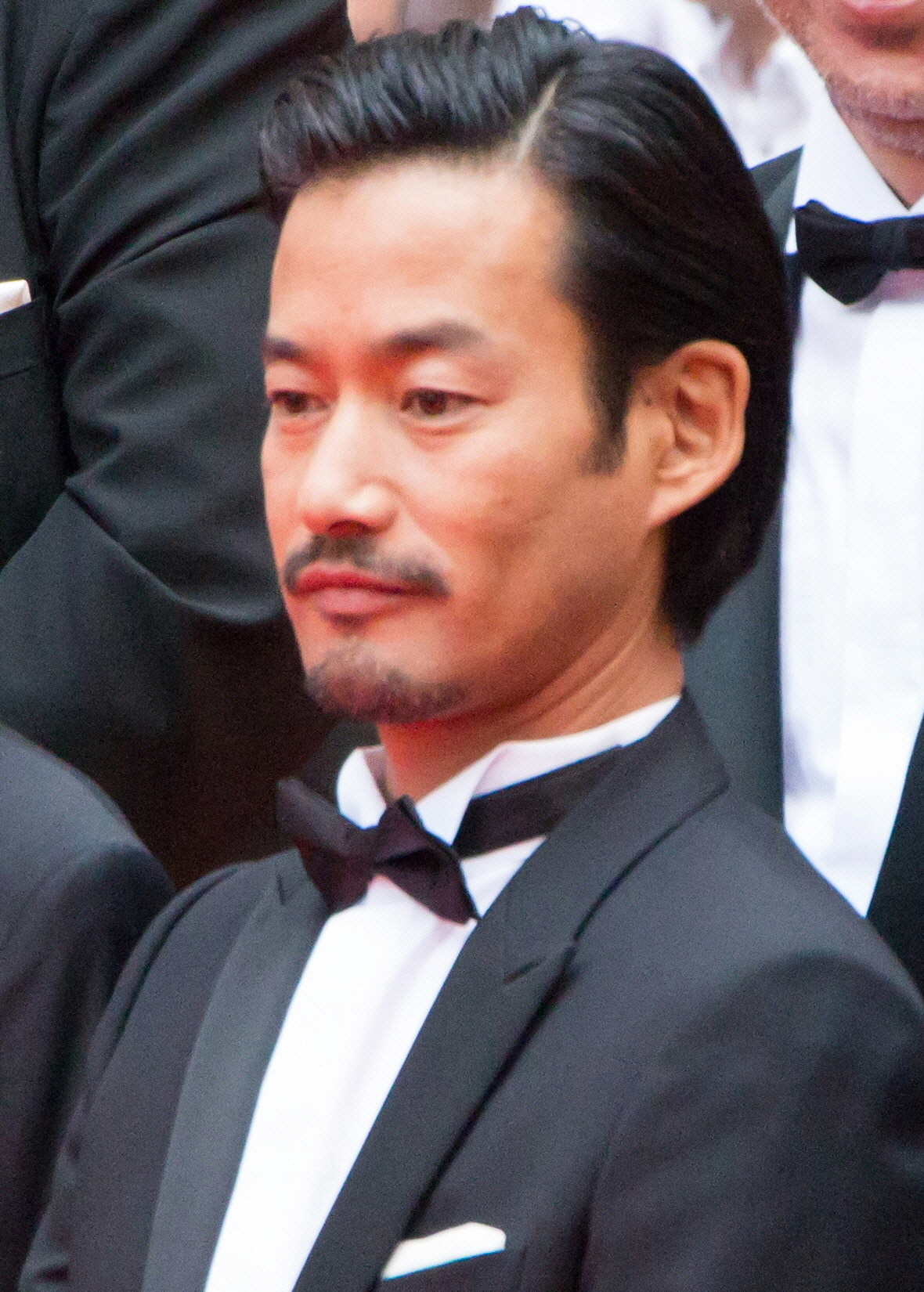
- Takenouchi in 2016
- Born: January 2, 1971 (age 55); Tokyo, Japan
- Occupations: Actor; model
- Years active: 1994–present
- Known for: Calmi Cuori Appassionati; Hoshi no Kinka; Nagareboshi

Yutaka Takenouchi (竹野内 豊 (hiragana:たけのうちゆたか), Takenouchi Yutaka; born January 2, 1971) is a Japanese actor. His on-screen acting debut was in the drama 「ボクの就職」 (Boku no Syūshoku) in 1994, after winning a modeling contest. He also appeared in commercials.

== Filmography ==
=== TV series ===
- My First Job (1994), Sanshirō Sasaki
- Tokyo University Love Story (1994), Kōichi Asakura
- Heaven's Coins (1995), Takumi Nagai
- Love Still Hasn't Begun (1995), Satoshi Nagai
- Long Vacation (1996), Shinji Hayama
- Heaven's Coins 2 (1996), Takumi Nagai
- Wedding Story (1997), Tsutomu Otaki
- Beach Boys (1997), Kaito Suzuki
- With Love (1998), Takashi Hasegawa
- The Last Song (1998), Itaru Noa
- The World of Ice (1999), Eiki Hirokawa
- Merry Christmas in Summer (2000), Ryou Kinoshita
- Shotgun Wedding (2001), Ryūnosuke Hirao
- Toshiie and Matsu: Love Shines Through (NHK, 2002), Yoshiyuki Sawaki
- Psycho Doctor (2002), Kyōsuke Kai
- Human Crossing (2003), Jiro Koyama (ep. 6)
- Time Limit (2003), Tsuyoshi Mizusawa
- Drop-out Teacher Returns to School (2003), Yoshimori Masaya
- China's Last Princess (2003), Pujie
- Rikon Bengoshi (2004), Yoshiyuki Hirosawa (ep. 1)
- Proof of the Man (2004), Kōichirō Munesue
- Ruri no Shima (2005), Tatsuya Kawashima/Makoto Takahara
- Yeonmogok (2006), Shō Nishijima/Takumi Kanayama
- Kazoku: Tsuma no Fuzai, Otto no Sonzai (2006), Ryōhei Kamikawa
- Tomorrow: Hi wa Mata Noboru (2008), Kōhei Moriyama
- Boss (2009), Shinjirō Nodate
- The Waste Land (2009–2010), Shinichirō Hyōdō
- Nagareboshi (2010), Kengo Okada
- Boss 2 (2011), Shinjirō Nodate
- Mō Ichido Kimi ni, Propose (2012), Haru Miyamoto
- Olympic no Minoshirokin (2013), Masao Ochiai
- Suteki na Sen Taxi (2014), Edawakare
- Stepmom and Daughter Blues (2019), Ryōichi Miyamoto
- Idaten (2019), Hyozo Omori
- Ichikei's Crow: The Criminal Court Judges (2021), Michio Iruma
- The Days (2023), Shinji Maejima
- Anpan (2025), Hiroshi Yanai
- Human Vapor (2026), Yakuza

=== Films ===
- Calmi Cuori Appassionati (2001), Junsei Agata
- Best Wishes for Tomorrow (2007), Narrator
- Wenny Has Wings (2008), Masahito Fukazawa
- The Hovering Blade (2009), Takashi Oribe
- Oba: The Last Samurai (2011), Captain Ōba Sakae
- A Honeymoon in Hell: Mr. and Mrs. Oki's Fabulous Trip (2011), Nobuyoshi Ōki
- The Apology King (2013), Masaomi Minowa
- The Tale of Nishino (2014), Yukihiko Nishino
- Jinsei no Yakusoku (2016), Yūma Nakahara
- Shin Godzilla (2016), Hideki Akasaka
- The Last Recipe (2017), Miyake
- Birds Without Names (2017), Shun'ichi Kurosaki
- The Blood of Wolves (2018), Kōsuke Nozaki
- Talking the Picture (2019), Tadayoshi Kimura
- Shin Ultraman (2022), Government official
- Six Singing Women (2023), Kayashima
- Ichikei's Crow: The Movie (2023), Michio Iruma
- Life of Mariko in Kabukicho (2023), Masaya
- Shin Kamen Rider (2023), Tachibana
- April Come She Will (2024), Mamoru Iyoda
- Spirit World (2024), Hayato Nobusawa
- Yukikaze (2025), Kazutoshi Terasawa
- Children Untold (2026), Koichi Kayano

=== Dubbing ===
- The Little Prince (2015), the Snake
