= Re. =

Studio album by Aya Ueto
- Released: December 8, 2004
- Recorded: 2004
- Genre: Pop
- Length: 52:20
- Label: Flight Master
- Producer: Gorō Kumagai

Aya Ueto chronology
| Message (2004) | Re. (2004) | Uetoayamix (2005) |

Singles from Re.
- 1. "Kaze/Okuru Kotoba" Released: June 16, 2004; 2. "Afuresō na Ai, Daite/Namida wo Fuite" Released: July 28, 2004; 3. "Usotsuki" Released: November 17, 2004

Re. is the third studio album by Japanese pop singer Aya Ueto. It was released on December 8, 2004 on Flight Master.

== Background ==
Re. was released only nine months after her second album and unlike her previous efforts, it includes only eleven tracks. The album is mostly made up of winter ballads. The album title, Re., is meant to designate a "response" to her previous album, Message.

== Chart performance ==
Re. peaked at #11 on the Oricon Daily Albums Chart and debuted at #19 on the Weekly Albums Chart with 19,017 copies sold. The album charted for a total of seven weeks and sold over 35,000 copies.

== Track listing ==
| No. | Title | Lyrics | Music | Length |
|---|---|---|---|---|
| 1. | "Winter Love" | Yuki Nakajima | Masaki Iehara | 4:04 |
| 2. | "Usotsuki" | Nori, Tetsurō Oda | Oda | 4:45 |
| 3. | "Name of Love" | Shungo. | Kosuke Morimoto | 4:33 |
| 4. | "Shinjirarenai = Shinjitai" (シンジラレナイ＝シンジタイ I Want to Believe the Unbelievable) | Hanano Tanaka | Mikio Sakai | 3:53 |
| 5. | "Kaze (Minamikaze Version)" (風～南風バージョン～ Wind (South Wind Version)) | Yoshiko Miura | Oda | 4:22 |
| 6. | "Fuyu no Hanabi" (冬の花火 Winter Fireworks) | Tadashi Hirosawa | Hirosawa | 4:45 |
| 7. | "Afuresō na Ai, Daite" | Miura | Oda | 4:55 |
| 8. | "Namida wo Fuite" | Hirosawa | Sin | 5:17 |
| 9. | "Sekaijū ga Happī Bāsudei" (世界中がハッピーバースディ Happy Birthday to the World) | Miura | Hirokazu Fujī | 5:14 |
| 10. | "Ano Hito ni Aitai ("Re." Style)" (あの人に会いたい I Want to See that Person) | Shinji Araki | Jun Kawanishi, Kano Kawashima | 4:46 |
| 11. | "Ai no Tame ni. (B2f's Love Affair Mix)" | Oda | Oda | 5:46 |
| Total length: | | | | 52:20 |

== Charts and sales ==
| Chart (2004) | Peak position | Sales |
|---|---|---|
| Japan Oricon Daily Albums Chart | 11 | 35,242 |
| Japan Oricon Weekly Albums Chart | 19 | 35,242 |
| Japan Oricon Monthly Albums Chart | 50 | 35,242 |
