= Afuresō na Ai, Daite/Namida o Fuite =

Single by Aya Ueto

from the album Re.
- Released: July 28, 2004
- Recorded: 2004
- Genre: Pop
- Length: 20:34
- Label: Flight Master
- Songwriters: Yoshiko Miura, Tetsurō Oda, Tadashi Hirosawa, Sin
- Producers: Nobuyuki Shimizu, Sin

Aya Ueto singles chronology
"Kaze/Okuru Kotoba" (2004)	"Afuresō na Ai, Daite/Namida o Fuite" (2004)	"Usotsuki" (2004)

"Afuresō na Ai, Daite/Namida o Fuite" (あふれそうな愛、抱いて/涙をふいて; lit. "Holding Back My Love from Overflowing/Wipe Your Tears") is the ninth single by Japanese recording artist Aya Ueto. It was released on July 28, 2004 as the second single from Ueto's third studio album Re..

== Overview ==
"Afuresō na Ai, Daite"
A 30-second sample of the second chorus of "Afuresō na Ai, Daite."

"Namida o Fuite"
A 30-second sample of the bridge and third chorus of "Namida o Fuite."

"Afuresō na Ai, Daite/Namida o Fuite" is a double A-side single released only a month after "Kaze/Okuru Kotoba." Like "Kaze" before it, "Afuresō na Ai, Daite" was written by Yoshiko Miura, composed by Tetsurō Oda, and arranged by Nobuyuki Shimizu. The song was used in commercials for the Lotte ice cream Soh, starring Ueto herself. CDJournal described it as an "unusual breakup song" and complimented its "literally fresh melody," while Barks likened the song to Seiko Matsuda's 1980 hit "Aoi Sangoshou," which was also written by Miura.

The second A-side, "Namida o Fuite," which coincidentally shares the same title as Ueto's first TV drama, was written by singer-songwriter Tadashi Hirosawa and composed and arranged by music producer Sin. The song served as theme song for the animation film Konjiki no Gash Bell!! Movie 1: Unlisted Demon 101. At a press conference for the movie, Ueto commented, "I always dreamed of having one of my songs play in a movie, so I'm thrilled." The single also includes a re-arranged version of "Personal," which previously served as the first ending theme for the Konjiki no Gash Bell!! anime series.

For a chance to win one of the 300 copies issued of the official remix CD "Kaze: Home Grown Mix", a special campaign for purchasers of both "Kaze/Okuru Kotoba" and "Afuresō na Ai, Daite/Namida o Fuite" was held until August 31, 2004.

== Chart performance ==
"Afuresō na Ai, Daite/Namida o Fuite" debuted on the Oricon Daily Singles chart at number 10, where it remained for three consecutive days, starting July 27, 2004. It peaked at number 10 on the Oricon Weekly Singles chart, with 18,672 copies sold in its first week. The single charted for eight weeks and has sold a total of 33,723 copies.

== Track listing ==
No.	Title	Lyrics	Music	Arranger(s)	Length
1.	"Afuresō na Ai, Daite" (あふれそうな愛、抱いて, "Holding Back My Love from Overflowing")	Yoshiko Miura	Tetsurō Oda	Nobuyuki Shimizu	4:55
2.	"Namida o Fuite" (涙をふいて, "Wipe Your Tears")	Tadashi Hirosawa	Sin	Sin	5:23
3.	"Personal (2004 Summer)"	T2ya	T2ya	T2ya	5:19
4.	"Afuresō na Ai, Daite (Instrumental)"		Oda	Shimizu	4:57
Total length:					20:34

== Charts ==
Chart (2004)	Peak position
Oricon Daily Singles	10
Oricon Weekly Singles	10
SoundScan Japan Weekly Singles	15

== Release history ==
Region	Date	Format	Label
Japan	July 28, 2004	CD	Pony Canyon
Taiwan	July 30, 2004	CD	Pony Canyon
