= Namida no Niji/Save Me =

Single by Aya Ueto

from the album Happy Magic: Smile Project
- Released: May 30, 2007
- Recorded: March 2007
- Genre: Pop, pop rock
- Length: 4:22 ("Namida no Niji"); 5:31 ("Save Me")
- Label: Flight Master
- Songwriter(s): Aya Ueto, Izumi Sakaki, Yoo, Hiroaki Hayama
- Producer(s): Akihisa Matzura, Hayama

Aya Ueto singles chronology
"Way to Heaven" (2007)	"Namida no Niji/Save Me" (2007)	"Smile for.../Mō Ichido Dake" (2009)

"Namida no Niji/Save Me" (涙の虹/SAVE ME, lit. "Rainbow of Tears/Save Me") is the fifteenth single by Japanese recording artist Aya Ueto. It was released on May 30, 2007.

== Overview ==
"Namida no Niji" was included on the standard edition of Ueto's fifth studio album Happy Magic: Smile Project. It served as theme song for the TV Asahi drama Hotelier, starring Ueto herself. The song, which she co-wrote with singer-songwriter Izumi Sakaki, marks Ueto's first foray into songwriting.

"Namida no Niji"
A 30-second sample of "Namida no Niji."

"Save Me"
A 30-second sample of "Save Me."

In a press release, Ueto commented, "The song was composed by a Korean producer. We couldn't quite find the right Japanese lyrics to go with the music, so I decided that perhaps I should write the words myself." About the title of the song, she commented, "When it's raining, people's faces are hidden by their umbrellas. Without an umbrella, you get to experience a world that no one else at that moment can."

Ueto explained in an interview with Oricon Style her reasons for not writing her own lyrics before "Namida no Niji":

I had always said I would never write the lyrics to my songs because it would feel like people were peeping into my heart, but after deciding on the theme for the song and once I started writing, I realized it wasn't so bad after all. I worked with Izumi Sakaki on this song, she took my lyrics and polished them. I'm happy it turned out so well.

The second A-side, "Save Me," was written, composed, and produced by Tourbillon keyboardist Hiroaki Hayama. It was used in the TBS sports program J Spo. Despite being an A-side, "Save Me" was not included in Ueto's succeeding studio album Happy Magic: Smile Project.

== Chart performance ==
"Namida no Niji/Save Me" debuted on the Oricon Daily Singles chart at number 12 on May 29, 2007 and climbed to number 11 the following day. It peaked at number 17 on the Oricon Weekly Singles chart, with 8,904 copies sold in its first week. The single charted for five weeks and has sold a total of 14,858 copies.

== Track listing ==
No.	Title	Lyrics	Music	Arranger(s)	Length
1.	"Namida no Niji" (涙の虹 "Rainbow of Tears")	Aya Ueto, Izumi Sakaki	Yoo	Akihisa Matzura	4:22
2.	"Save Me"	Hiroaki Hayama	Hayama	Hayama	5:31
3.	"Way to Heaven (100db Mix)"	Shoko	Shōichirō Hirata	Hirata	4:41
4.	"Namida no Niji (Instrumental)"		Yoo	Matzura	4:21
5.	"Save Me (Instrumental)"		Hayama	Hayama	5:32
Total length:					24:43

== Charts ==
Chart (2007)	Peak position
Oricon Daily Singles	11
Oricon Weekly Singles	17
SoundScan Japan Weekly Singles	18
Taiwan Five Music J-pop/K-pop Chart	20

== Release history ==
Region	Date	Format	Label
Japan	May 30, 2007	CD, digital download	Pony Canyon
Taiwan	June 1, 2007	CD	Pony Canyon
