= Z-1 (band) =

Japanese musical group

- Origin: Tokyo, Japan
- Genres: Jpop
- Years active: 1999–2002
- Label: Toshiba EMI
- Members: Aya Ueto; Mami Nejiki; Manami Nishikawa; Mai Fujiya

Z-1 was a Japanese idol quartet signed under Toshiba EMI from 1999 to 2002. The name Z-1 signifies the last (Z) super stars of the 20th century and the first (1) of the 21st.

== Members ==
- Ueto, Aya (上戸彩), born on September 14, 1985, in Tokyo.
- Nejiki, Mami (根食真実), born on October 25, 1985, in Tokyo.
- Nishiwaki, Manami (西脇愛美), born on May 26, 1983, in Kanagawa Prefecture.
- Fujiya, Mai (藤谷舞), born on October 20, 1984, in Saitama Prefecture

== Biography ==
In July 1998, Ueto (special prize winner), Nejiki (musical prize winner), Nishikawa and Fujiya were selected out of the participants of the talent agency Oscar Promotion's 7th All-Japan National Young Beauty contest to form Z-1.

In 1999, the four landed a regular spot on the Fuji TV variety program "Kaishingeki TV Utaemon". They made one of their first appearances at a PR event for the Japanese dub of Pixar's "A Bug's Life". They debuted in July of the same year with the single "Vibe!", released in four versions, each carrying a different remix of the title track.

In 2000, the song "Bakka Mitai!!" ((It's) So Stupid) was banned from airing on NHK due to its mildly vulgar title.

In 2002, after five singles the group disbanded. Ueto went on to pursue a solo career, as well as becoming one of Japan's most prolific young actresses. Nejiki debuted as a solo artist in 2004 while Fujiya enjoyed a short-lived modeling career. Nishikawa is currently a member of the indies rock band "Tarock".

In 2003, Ueto's success as a solo artist prompted Toshiba EMI to release compilation album of all the Z-1 material.

== Discography ==
=== Singles ===
Release	Title	Weekly Oricon singles chart peak positions and sales		Album
Release	Title	Rank	Sales	Album
1999/07/16	1st Single "Vibe!"	uncharted	uncharted	All About Z-1
1999/12/08	2nd Single "You Your You"	95	2,250	All About Z-1
2000/05/10	3rd Single "Bakka Mitai!!"	90	2,310	All About Z-1
2000/08/09	4th Single "Kimete Yaru Summer Love"	92	2,240	All About Z-1
2000/11/19	5th Single "Be My Love"	90	2,130	All About Z-1

=== Albums ===
Release	Title	Weekly Oricon singles chart peak positions and sales	
Release	Title	Rank	Sales
2003/03/29	1st Album "All About Z-1"	uncharted	uncharted

== TV ==
- Kaishingeki TV Utaemon (Fuji TV, 1999)
- The Yoru mo Hit Parade (NTV, 1999)

== Commercials ==
- Toshiba "Alkaline Battery 1"
- Three F
- Yomiuri Shimbun magazine "ZipZap"
