= License (album) =

Studio album by Aya Ueto
- Released: March 8, 2006
- Recorded: 2005–2006
- Genre: Pop
- Length: 64:32
- Label: Flight Master
- Producer: Gorō Kumagai

Aya Ueto chronology
Uetoayamix (2005)	License (2006)	Best of Uetoaya: Single Collection (2006)

Alternative cover
- Limited edition cover

Singles from License
- 1. "Yume no Chikara" Released: June 8, 2005; 2. "Kaze wo Ukete" Released: August 3, 2005; 3. "Egao no Mama de" Released: February 15, 2006

License is the fourth studio album by Japanese pop singer Aya Ueto. It was released on March 8, 2006 on Flight Master.

== Background ==
License includes Ueto's previous singles "Yume no Chikara", "Kaze wo Ukete", and "Egao no Mama de." The album took a more adult direction than her previous releases. The last track, "Fermata", was penned by Ueto's brother Makoto. License was released in two formats: limited CD+DVD edition, which includes a DVD featuring the music video and making of "Egao no Mama de" as well as a special interview, and the standard CD only edition.

== Chart performance ==
License peaked at #9 on the Oricon Daily Albums Chart and debuted at #19 on the Weekly Albums Chart with 16,029 copies sold. The album charted for a total of four weeks and sold over 22,000 copies.

== Track listing ==
CD
No.	Title	Lyrics	Music	Length
1.	"Egao no Mama de"	Ryoji	Ryoji	5:14
2.	"1 Million Thanks"	Tōko Furuuchi	Yōji Noi	5:04
3.	"Kaze wo Ukete"	Ryoji	Ryoji	5:06
4.	"Nukumori" (ぬくもり Warmth)	Masaru Shimabukuro	Shimabukuro	4:30
5.	"Yakusoku no Basho" (約束の場所 Promised Place)	Ryoji	Ryoji	5:16
6.	"Moshimo Negai ga Kanau Nara featuring Kohei Japan" (もしも願いが叶うなら If My Wish Comes True)	Gajin, Kohei Sakama	Gajin, Sakama	5:02
7.	"Look Into the Future"	Kei Yoshikawa, Shoko	Yoshikawa	5:22
8.	"Hoshizora Haiuei" (星空ハイウエイ Starry Sky Highway)	Shoko	Miki Watabe	4:14
9.	"Kagiri Aru Toki no Naka de" (限りある時の中で In the Little Time We Have)	T2ya	T2ya	4:59
10.	"Yume no Chikara"	Toshihiko Takamizawa	Takamizawa	4:57
11.	"Shiroi Yuki ga Furu Yori ni" (白い雪が降る夜に On the Night When the White Snow Falls)	Takamizawa	Takamizawa	4:38
12.	"Kono Sekai ni Umarete" (この世界に生まれて Born in this World)	Yuki Nakajima	Sin	6:14
13.	"Fermata"	Makoto Ueto	Sin	3:51
Total length:				64:32

DVD
No.	Title	Length
1.	"Egao no Mama de" (PV)
2.	"Egao no Mama de" (Special PV (Document "Hair Cut" Version))
3.	"Egao no Mama de" (PV Making)
4.	"Interview"

== Charts and sales ==
Chart (2006)	Peak position	Sales
Japan Oricon Daily Albums Chart	9	21,746
Japan Oricon Weekly Albums Chart	19	21,746
