= Golden Arrow Award =

Japanese media awards ceremony

- Awarded for: Best in Japanese media
- Country: Japan
- Presented by: Japan Magazine Publishers Association
- First award: March 17, 1964
- Final award: March 3, 2008
- Website: Official website

A Golden Arrow Award was an accolade presented by the members of the Japan Magazine Publishers Association (JMPA) to recognize excellence in domestic media, such as in film, television, and music.

The 1st Golden Arrow Awards were held on March 17, 1964. The 45th and last Golden Arrow Awards were presented on March 3, 2008.

== Award categories ==
- Film Award
- Play Award
- Music Award
- Broadcast Award – Drama
- Broadcast Award – Variety
- Sports Award
- Newcomer Award
- Popularity Award
- Merit Award
- Magazine Award
- Special Award

== See also ==
- List of Asian television awards
