= Kanshō/Mermaid =

"Kanshō"

Single by Aya Ueto

from the album Message
- A-side: "Mermaid" (double A-side)
- Released: August 27, 2003
- Genre: Pop
- Length: 4:47
- Label: Flight Master
- Songwriter(s): Pipeline Project
- Producer(s): Pipeline Project

Aya Ueto singles chronology
| "Message" / "Personal" (2003) | "Kanshō" / "Mermaid" (2003) | "Binetsu" (2003) |

Audio sample
- "Kanshō": file; help

"Kanshō" (感傷(かんしょう), lit. "Sentimentality") / "Mermaid" is a double A-side single by Japanese singer Aya Ueto, from her second studio album, Message. It was released by Flight Master on August 27, 2003. "Kanshō" is the theme song to the TBS drama series Hitonatsu no Papa e (ひと夏のパパへ) (2003), starring Ueto herself. "Mermaid" was used in commercials for Lotte ice cream Soh, starring Ueto herself.

== Background ==
"Kanshō" and "Mermaid" were written, composed, arranged and produced by Tube members Nobuteru Maeda and Michiya Haruhata, credited under the group name Pipeline Project. The single was released one day short of the one-year anniversary of Ueto's solo debut. The first pressing of the single featured an alternate cover art and included passes for a release event, held at VenusFort in Kōtō, Tokyo.

== Chart performance ==
"Kanshō" / "Mermaid" entered the daily Oricon Singles Chart at number 8, and climbed to number 7 the following day, where it peaked. The single debuted on both the weekly Oricon Singles Chart, selling 27,000 copies in the first week, and on the SoundScan singles chart, at number 9. "Kanshō" / "Mermaid" charted on the Oricon Singles Chart for seven weeks, selling a reported total of 40,000 copies during its run.

== Track listing ==
All tracks are written by Pipeline Project

| No. | Title | Arranger(s) | Length |
|---|---|---|---|
| 1. | "Kanshō" (感傷, "Sentimentality") | Pipeline Project | 4:47 |
| 2. | "Mermaid" | Pipeline Project | 3:57 |
| 3. | "Kanshō" (Instrumental) | Pipeline Project | 4:47 |
| 4. | "Mermaid" (Instrumental) | Pipeline Project | 3:54 |
| Total length: | | | 17:25 |

== Credits and personnel ==
- Vocals - Aya Ueto
- Songwriting, production, arrangement - Pipeline Project
- Engineering - Yasuyuki Hara, Akira Sato
- Mixing - Akira Sato
- Production coordinator - Shingo Nishimura

Credits adapted from Best of Uetoaya: Single Collection album liner notes.

== Charts ==
| Chart (2003) | Peak position |
|---|---|
| Japan Daily Singles (Oricon) | 7 |
| Japan Weekly Singles (Oricon) | 9 |
| Japan Monthly Singles (Oricon) | 24 |
| Japan Weekly Singles (SoundScan) | 9 |

== Sales ==
| Region | Certification | Certified units/sales |
|---|---|---|
| Japan | — | 40,000 |

== Release history ==
| Region | Date | Format(s) | Label | Ref. |
|---|---|---|---|---|
| Japan | August 27, 2003 | CD | Flight Master | |
| Taiwan | September 3, 2003 | CD | Skyhigh Entertainment | |
