= Message (Aya Ueto album) =

Studio album by Aya Ueto
- Released: March 3, 2004
- Recorded: 2003–2004
- Genre: Pop, pop rock
- Length: 59:48
- Label: Flight Master
- Producer: Gorō Kumagai

Aya Ueto chronology
Ayaueto (2003)	Message (2004)	Re. (2004)

Singles from Message
- 1. "Message/Personal" Released: May 14, 2003; 2. "Kanshō/Mermaid" Released: August 27, 2003; 3. "Binetsu" Released: November 27, 2003; 4. "Ai no Tame ni." Released: February 4, 2004

Message is the second studio album by Japanese pop singer Aya Ueto. It was released on March 3, 2004 on Flight Master.

== Background ==
Message includes Ueto's previous singles "Message/Personal", "Kanshō/Mermaid", "Binetsu" and "Ai no Tame ni.". The album's initial track listing included a fourteenth track entitled "Shiawase ni Naru Yō ni" (幸せになるように Wish You Happiness) but it was eventually scrapped and never released. The seventh track, "Taiyō to Tsuki", was initially called "Tonari ni Ite Hoshii" (I Want You By My Side), which is a line from the song's chorus. The second track, "Okuru Kotoba", is a cover of the Tetsuya Takeda-fronted folk band Kaientai's 1979 hit of the same name.

== Chart performance ==
Message peaked at #4 on the Oricon Daily Albums Chart and debuted at #6 on the Weekly Albums Chart with 43,154 copies sold. The album charted for a total of eleven weeks and sold over 75,000 copies.

== Track listing ==
No.	Title	Lyrics	Music	Length
1.	"Ai no Tame ni."	Tetsurō Oda	Oda	5:06
2.	"Okuru Kotoba" (贈る言葉 The Words I Send to You)	Tetsuya Takeda	Kazuomi Chiba	4:33
3.	"Message (Album Version)"	Yūho Iwasato	H∧L	4:35
4.	"Aozora" (青空 Blue Sky)	Shin'ichi Asada	Kosuke Morimoto	3:56
5.	"Kanshō"	Pipeline Project	Pipeline Project	4:46
6.	"Mermaid"	Pipeline Project	Pipeline Project	3:58
7.	"Taiyō to Tsuki" (太陽と月 The Sun and Moon)	Mikio Sakai	Sakai	5:08
8.	"Personal"	T2ya	T2ya	4:53
9.	"Binetsu"	Hiromasa Ijichi	Miki Watabe	4:04
10.	"Kiseki" (キセキ Miracle)	T2ya	T2ya	4:52
11.	"Silence (Coconuts Groove Version)"	Hanano Tanaka	Nobuyuki Shimizu	5:16
12.	"Steppin' Out (Complete Version)"	Naho Tanaka	H∧L	3:07
13.	"Ai no Tame ni. (Lover's Splash Mix)"	Oda	Oda	5:34
Total length:				59:48

== Charts and sales ==
Chart (2004)	Peak position	Sales
Japan Oricon Daily Albums Chart	4	74,934
Japan Oricon Weekly Albums Chart	6	74,934
Japan Oricon Monthly Albums Chart	26	74,934
Japan SoundScan Albums Chart	9	74,934
