= Egao no Mama de =

Single by Aya Ueto

from the album License
- Released: February 15, 2006
- Genre: Pop
- Length: 5:19
- Label: Flight Master
- Songwriter(s): Ryoji
- Producer(s): Ryoji

Aya Ueto singles chronology
| "Kaze o Ukete" (2005) | "Egao no Mama de" (2006) | "Way to Heaven" (2007) |

"Egao no Mama de" (笑顔のままで, lit. "Still Smiling") is the thirteenth single by Japanese recording artist Aya Ueto, released February 15, 2006 as the third and final single from Ueto's fourth studio album License.

== Overview ==
"Egao no Mama de"
A 30-second sample of the first chorus of "Egao no Mama de."

"Egao no Mama de" was written and produced by Ryoji from Ketsumeishi, while its title was chosen by Ueto. The song marks Ueto's second consecutive collaboration with Ryoji, who also wrote and produced "Kaze o Ukete" (2005). "Egao no Mama de" is Ueto's first single to not contain a B-side, instead two "mega mixes," one featuring a mash-up of Ueto's singles to date, and the other featuring songs from License, were included.

The theme of the song is growth and its lyrics were inspired by the cherry blossom season, which is commonly associated with encounters and separations. The music video features a scene in which Ueto gets a drastic haircut to reflect her personal growth.

== Chart performance ==
"Egao no Mama de" debuted on the Oricon Daily Singles chart at number 8 on February 14, 2006, and peaked at number 15 on the Oricon Weekly Singles chart, with 9,546 copies sold in its first week. The single charted for four weeks and has sold a total of 12,888 copies.

== Track listing ==
All tracks are written by Ryoji

| No. | Title | Remixer(s) | Length |
|---|---|---|---|
| 1. | "Egao no Mama de" (笑顔のままで "Still Smiling") | | 5:19 |
| 2. | "Ueto-Aya-Mega-Mix File 01 Mega-Hits" | Koma2Kaz, Home Grown, Jazztronik | 8:23 |
| 3. | "Ueto-Aya-Mega-Mix File 02 Prologue of "License"" | Koma2Kaz | 6:34 |
| 4. | "Egao no Mama de (Instrumental)" | | 5:14 |
| Total length: | | | 25:31 |

== Charts ==
| Chart (2006) | Peak position |
|---|---|
| Oricon Daily Singles | 8 |
| Oricon Weekly Singles | 15 |
| SoundScan Japan Weekly Singles | 18 |
| Taiwan Five Music J-pop/K-pop Chart | 19 |

== Release history ==
| Region | Date | Format | Label |
|---|---|---|---|
| Japan | February 15, 2006 | CD, digital download | Pony Canyon |
| Taiwan | February 24, 2006 | CD | Pony Canyon |
