= Hello (Aya Ueto song) =

Single by Aya Ueto

from the album Ayaueto
- Released: February 26, 2003
- Genre: Pop
- Length: 4:45
- Label: Flight Master
- Songwriter(s): T2ya
- Producer(s): T2ya

Aya Ueto singles chronology
| "Kizuna" (2002) | "Hello" (2003) | "Message" / "Personal" (2003) |

Audio sample
- "Hello": file; help

"Hello" is a song recorded by Japanese singer Aya Ueto, from her debut studio album, Ayaueto. It was released as the album's third and final single by Flight Master on February 26, 2003. The single was released in two versions, a standard edition and a limited edition, each with differing cover art. The first pressing of the limited edition also featured different artwork. The limited edition included a bonus DVD featuring the music video for "Hello". The "Symphony Modulation Style" remix of the song was used in commercials for Lotte ice cream Soh, starring Ueto herself.

== Background ==
"Hello" was written, composed, arranged and produced by T2ya, marking his third consecutive collaboration with Ueto. CDJournal described the song as a "lyrical and melancholy ballad". "Hello" is composed in the key of A-flat major and set to a tempo of 84 beats per minute. Ueto's vocals span from B♭_{3} to C♯_{5}. Initially, "Ambition", the leading track on Ayaueto, was set to be released as the third single off the album. However, Ueto insisted on "Hello" instead. "Hello" was recorded after Ueto had wrapped filming for Azumi, and right before Ueto started filming the drama series Kōkō Kyōshi (2003).

== Chart performance ==
"Hello" entered the daily Oricon Singles Chart at number 6. It climbed to number 5 the next day, where it peaked. The single debuted at number 10 on the weekly chart, selling 23,000 copies in the first week. The limited edition of the single debuted at number 12 on the SoundScan singles chart. "Hello" charted on the Oricon Singles Chart for nine weeks, selling a reported total of 41,000 copies during its run.

== Track listing ==
| No. | Title | Writer(s) | Arranger(s) | Length |
|---|---|---|---|---|
| 1. | "Hello" | T2ya | T2ya | 4:45 |
| 2. | "Hello" (Symphony Modulation Style) | T2ya | Aquaorb | 3:41 |
| 3. | "Puzzle" (New 80's Remix) | Natsumi Kobayashi; Shinichirō Murayama | Murayama | 3:42 |
| 4. | "Pureness" (Under Island Style) | T2ya | T.M.O | 5:27 |
| 5. | "Hello" (Instrumental) | T2ya | T2ya | 4:44 |
| Total length: | | | | 22:19 |

Limited edition DVD
| No. | Title | Director(s) | Length |
|---|---|---|---|
| 1. | "Hello" (Video Clip) | Takehito Kobayashi |

== Charts ==
| Chart (2003) | Peak position |
|---|---|
| Japan Daily Singles (Oricon) | 5 |
| Japan Weekly Singles (Oricon) | 10 |
| Japan Monthly Singles (Oricon) | 37 |
| Japan Weekly Singles (SoundScan) (CD/DVD) | 12 |

== Sales ==
| Region | Certification | Certified units/sales |
|---|---|---|
| Japan | — | 41,000 |

== Release history ==
| Region | Date | Format(s) | Label | Ref. |
|---|---|---|---|---|
| Japan | February 26, 2003 | CD; CD/DVD | Flight Master | |
| Taiwan | March 6, 2003 | CD | Skyhigh Entertainment | |
