= Kaze/Okuru Kotoba =

Single by Aya Ueto

from the album Re.
- Released: June 16, 2004
- Recorded: 2004
- Genre: Pop
- Length: 3:09 ("Kaze"); 4:35 ("Okuru Kotoba (Single Version)")
- Label: Flight Master
- Songwriters: Yoshiko Miura, Tetsurō Oda, Tetsuya Takeda, Kazuomi Chiba
- Producers: Nobuyuki Shimizu, Sin

Aya Ueto singles chronology
"Ai no Tame ni." (2004)	"Kaze/Okuru Kotoba" (2004)	"Afuresō na Ai, Daite/Namida o Fuite" (2004)

"Kaze/Okuru Kotoba" (風/贈る言葉; lit. "The Wind/My Words to You") is the eighth single by Japanese recording artist Aya Ueto. It was released on June 16, 2004 as the first single from Ueto's third studio album Re..

== Overview ==
"Kaze"
A 25-second sample of the chorus and bridge of "Kaze."

"Okuru Kotoba (Single Version)"
A 30-second sample of the first chorus of "Okuru Kotoba (Single Version)."

"Kaze/Okuru Kotoba" is a double A-side single released as the first of two back-to-back singles. The single was issued in CD+DVD format only. The DVD features the music videos for both A-sides. Like "Ai no Tame ni." before it, "Kaze" was composed by Tetsurō Oda, however this time the lyrics were written by Yoshiko Miura and the track arranged by Nobuyuki Shimizu. The song served as ending theme for the 12th season (80 episodes) of the long-running educational anime series Nintama Rantarō, which aired from April 5 to July 23, 2004. The chorus of the song features the vocals of the unit Kotsubu-gumi, which consists of the three youngest members of the idol group Bishōjo Club 31. Barks described the sound of "Kaze" as "Shōwa reggae," while CDJournal called it a "fun Okinawan-chic pop song" and complimented Ueto's "steady" vocal delivery.

The second A-side is a cover of the Tetsuya Takeda-led folk group Kaientai's 1979 hit "Okuru Kotoba." The cover, which was initially recorded for Ueto's second studio album Message, was released as an A-side after being chosen as the theme song for the video game adaption of the TBS drama 3-nen B-gumi Kinpachi-sensei. The single version is a newly arranged acoustic rendition of the song. At a press conference for the video game, Ueto and Takeda, who starred together in the sixth season of the series, performed a duet of the song.

== Chart performance ==
"Kaze/Okuru Kotoba" debuted on the Oricon Daily Singles chart at number 6 and climbed to number 5 the following day. It peaked at number 8 on the Oricon Weekly Singles chart, with 21,927 copies sold in its first week. The single charted for ten weeks and has sold a total of 44,240 copies.

== Track listing ==
No.	Title	Lyrics	Music	Arranger(s)	Length
1.	"Kaze" (風 "The Wind")	Yoshiko Miura	Tetsurō Oda	Nobuyuki Shimizu	3:09
2.	"Okuru Kotoba (Single Version)" (贈る言葉 ～シングルバージョン～ "My Words to You (Single Version)")	Tetsuya Takeda	Kazuomi Chiba	Sin	4:35
3.	"Ai no Tame ni. (March-tronik Style)"	Oda	Oda	Oda	7:05
4.	"Kaze (Original Karaoke)"		Oda	Shimizu	3:08
Total length:					17:57

== Charts ==
Chart (2004)	Peak position
Oricon Daily Singles	5
Oricon Weekly Singles	8
SoundScan Japan Weekly Singles	9

== Release history ==
Region	Date	Format	Label
Japan	June 16, 2004	CD+DVD	Pony Canyon
Taiwan	June 25, 2004	CD	Pony Canyon
