= Kaze o Ukete =

Single by Aya Ueto

from the album License
- Released: August 3, 2005
- Recorded: 2005
- Genre: Pop
- Length: 5:08
- Label: Flight Master
- Songwriter(s): Ryoji
- Producer(s): Ryoji

Aya Ueto singles chronology
"Yume no Chikara" (2005)	"Kaze o Ukete" (2005)	"Egao no Mama de" (2006)

"Kaze o Ukete" (風をうけて; lit. "Feel the Wind") is the twelfth single by Japanese recording artist Aya Ueto. It was released on August 3, 2005 as the second single from Ueto's fourth studio album License. "Kaze o Ukete" served as theme song for the animation film Konjiki no Gash Bell!! Movie 2: Attack of the Mecha-Vulcan.

== Overview ==
"Kaze o Ukete"
A 25-second sample of the first chorus of "Kaze o Ukete."

The title track and the B-side, "Yakusoku no Basho," were written and produced by Ryoji from Ketsumeishi. The collaboration came about as Ueto's record label was looking for new songs Ueto could record for her next album. Being a big fan of Ketsumeishi, her team offered Ryoji to produce a few songs for her, which he readily accepted. Ryoji also remixed Ueto's "Yume no Chikara" for the single, which features a verse by Ryoji himself.

Ueto commented on the collaboration, "When I received the demo, I couldn't believe it. I was touched to tears." "I did my very best," she added, explaining that during the recording, Ryoji advised her to not worry about being pitch-perfect and to just have fun with the song.

== Chart performance ==
"Kaze o Ukete" debuted on the Oricon Daily Singles chart at number 15 on August 2, 2005 and climbed to number 12 the following day. It peaked at number 17 on the Oricon Weekly Singles chart, with 13,938 copies sold in its first week. The single charted for six weeks and has sold a total of 12,888 copies.

== Track listing ==
No.	Title	Lyrics	Music	Arranger(s)	Length
1.	"Kaze o Ukete" (風をうけて "Feel the Wind")	Ryoji	Ryoji	Naoki-T	5:08
2.	"Yakusoku no Basho" (約束の場所 "Promised Place")	Ryoji	Ryoji	Naoki-T	5:19
3.	"Yume no Chikara (Kata no Chikara o Nuita Mix)" (夢のチカラ ～肩の力をぬいたmix～ "Power of Dreams (Take It Easy Mix)")	Toshihiko Takamizawa	Takamizawa	Ryoji, Naoki-T	4:54
4.	"Kaze o Ukete (Instrumental)"		Ryoji	Naoki-T	5:06
Total length:					20:28

== Charts ==
Chart (2005)	Peak position
Oricon Daily Singles	12
Oricon Weekly Singles	17
SoundScan Japan Weekly Singles	20

== Release history ==
Region	Date	Format	Label
Japan	August 3, 2005	CD, digital download	Pony Canyon
Taiwan	August 12, 2005	CD	Pony Canyon
