= Yume no Chikara =

Single by Aya Ueto

from the album License
- Released: June 8, 2005
- Recorded: 2005
- Genre: Pop, pop rock
- Length: 4:57
- Label: Flight Master
- Songwriter: Toshihiko Takamizawa
- Producer: Takamizawa

Aya Ueto singles chronology
"Usotsuki" (2004)	"Yume no Chikara" (2005)	"Kaze o Ukete" (2005)

"Yume no Chikara" (夢のチカラ; lit. "Power of Dreams") is the eleventh single by Japanese recording artist Aya Ueto. It was released on June 8, 2005 as the first single from Ueto's fourth studio album License.

== Overview ==
"Yume no Chikara"
A 25-second sample of "Yume no Chikara."

The title track and the B-side, "Get Fight," were written and produced by Toshihiko Takamizawa from The Alfee. "Yume no Chikara" served as theme song for the TV Asahi drama Attack No. 1, starring Ueto herself. CDJournal described "Yume no Chikara" as a "positive, relatable, and passionate song that gradually builds up emotion as it progresses."

The song was written to reflect the story of the drama's main character. At the single's release event, Ueto commented, "I sing this new song from the perspective of someone who is pursuing their dream."

== Chart performance ==
"Yume no Chikara" debuted on the Oricon Daily Singles chart at number 6 on June 7, 2005 and climbed to number 5 on June 11, 2005. It peaked at number 7 on the Oricon Weekly Singles chart, with 30,307 copies sold in its first week. The single charted for thirteen weeks and has sold a total of 85,095 copies.

== Track listing ==
No.	Title	Lyrics	Music	Arranger(s)	Length
1.	"Yume no Chikara" (夢のチカラ "Power of Dreams")	Toshihiko Takamizawa	Takamizawa	Takamizawa	4:57
2.	"Get Fight"	Takamizawa	Takamizawa	Takamizawa, Yūichirō Honda	4:25
3.	"Ai no Tame ni. (Cloudberry Jam Mix)"	Tetsurō Oda	Oda	Cloudberry Jam	4:00
4.	"Yume no Chikara (Instrumental)"		Takamizawa	Takamizawa	4:57
Total length:					18:28

== Charts, certifications and sales ==
=== Charts ===
Chart (2005)	Peak position
Oricon Daily Singles	5
Oricon Weekly Singles	7
Oricon Monthly Singles	16
Oricon Yearly Singles	123
SoundScan Japan Weekly Singles	8
Taiwan Five Music J-pop/K-pop Chart	12

=== Certifications and sales ===
Country	Certifications	Sales
Japan	Gold	85,095

== Release history ==
Region	Date	Format	Label
Japan	June 8, 2005	CD	Pony Canyon
Taiwan	June 17, 2005	CD	Pony Canyon
