= T2ya =

- Born: Tetsuya Hashinaga; May 14, 1982
- Origin: Gunma Prefecture, Japan
- Genres: Electropop, pop rock
- Occupations: Lyricist, composer, record producer
- Instrument: Electronic keyboard
- Years active: 1991–present
- Website: t-infinity.jp/creator/t2ya

T2ya, born Tetsuya Hashinaga (橋長 哲也, Hashinaga Tetsuya), is a Japanese songwriter and keyboardist from Gunma Prefecture. In the 1990s, he supported the agency Rising Production, which was later renamed Vision Factory. He wrote both the music and the lyrics of Olivia Lufkin's "I.L.Y. (Yokubō)" and "Re-act." He also composed Mika Nakashima's "One Survive."

In addition, T2ya wrote Aya Ueto's "Pureness," "Kizuna," "Hello" and "Personal."
