= Kizuna (Aya Ueto song) =

Single by Aya Ueto

from the album Ayaueto
- Released: November 7, 2002
- Recorded: September 13, 2002
- Genre: Pop rock
- Length: 4:57
- Label: Flight Master
- Songwriter(s): T2ya
- Producer(s): T2ya

Aya Ueto singles chronology
"Pureness" (2002)	"Kizuna" (2002)	"Hello" (2003)

Audio sample
- "Kizuna": file; help

"Kizuna" (stylized as "kizuna") is a song recorded by Japanese singer Aya Ueto, from her debut studio album, Ayaueto. It was released as the album's second single by Flight Master on November 7, 2002. The first pressing of the single included a bonus CD-ROM featuring a special video message from Ueto, as well as a program allowing fans to receive emails from her for a limited period. The song was used in commercials for Karaoke Station by Bandai, starring Ueto herself.

== Background ==
"Kizuna" was released two months following the debut single "Pureness". The track is a midtempo ballad and, like "Pureness," it was written, composed, arranged and produced by T2ya. It was recorded by Ueto on September 13, 2002, the day before her seventeenth birthday. At the time of release, Ueto was in the middle of filming her first feature film, Azumi (2003), and had to learn the lyrics to "Kizuna" on the day of recording. Due to the hectic filming schedule at the time, Ueto did not do any televised promotion for the single. The music video for "Kizuna" was shot on the rooftop of a hotel in Osaka. The video shoot was squeezed in an opening in the filming schedule when the crew for Azumi were moving locations from Kyoto to Hiroshima, giving Ueto just enough time to film the video and get back to set the next day. Ueto has stated that the music video for "Kizuna" is one of her personal favorites.

== Chart performance ==
"Kizuna" entered the daily Oricon Singles Chart at number 3. The single debuted on the weekly chart at number 5, with 32,000 copies sold in the first week. It spent a second week in the top twenty, at number 19, selling 11,000copies, before dropping out the following week. "Kizuna" charted on the Oricon Singles Chart for eleven weeks, selling a reported total of 57,000 copies during its run.

== Track listing ==
No.	Title	Writer(s)	Arranger(s)	Length
1.	"Kizuna"	T2ya	T2ya	4:57
2.	"Tears"	Natsumi Kobayashi; Naoto Suzuki	Suzuki	5:05
3.	"Pureness" (Million Plug Style Remix)	T2ya	T2ya	4:26
4.	"Kizuna" (Instrumental)	T2ya	T2ya	4:55
Total length:				19:23

First press CD-ROM
No.	Title	Length
1.	"uetoaya.tv Offline Contents"

== Charts ==
Chart (2002)	Peak position
Japan Daily Singles (Oricon)	3
Japan Weekly Singles (Oricon)	5
Japan Monthly Singles (Oricon)	22
Japan Weekly Singles (SoundScan)	7

== Sales ==
Region	Certification	Certified units/sales
Japan	—	57,000

== Release history ==
Region	Date	Format(s)	Label	Ref.
Japan	November 7, 2002	CD; CD/CD-ROM	Flight Master	
Taiwan	January 17, 2003	CD	Skyhigh Entertainment	
