= Binetsu =

Single by Aya Ueto

from the album Message
- Released: November 27, 2003
- Recorded: 2003
- Genre: J-pop
- Length: 19:31
- Label: Pony Canyon
- Songwriter(s): Hiromasa Ijichi, Miki Watabe, Hanano Tanaka, Nobuyuki Shimizu, T2ya

Aya Ueto singles chronology
"Kansho/Mermaid" (2003)	"Binetsu" (2003)	"Ai no Tameni." (2004)

First press cover
- First press (CD+Booklet) cover

"Binetsu" is Aya Ueto's sixth single. It was released on November 27, 2003. The first pressing came with an 18-page photo booklet. This single marked a turning point in Ueto's career as a singer where she took control over her appearance and sound.

== Track list ==
No.	Title	Length
1.	"Binetsu (微熱, Slight Fever)"	4:03
2.	"silence"	4:52
3.	"kizuna -Caliente Mix-"	6:27
4.	"Binetsu -Instrumental- (微熱 ～ｉｎｓｔｒｕｍｅｎｔａｌ～)"	4:02

== Live performances ==
- November 28, 2003 — Music Station
- December 4, 2003 — Utaban
- December 13, 2003 — Pop Jam
- December 26, 2003 — Music Station Super Live 2003

== Charts ==
=== Oricon Sales Chart ===
Release	Chart	Peak Position	First Week Sales	Sales Total	Chart Run
November 27, 2003	Oricon Daily Singles Chart	7			
November 27, 2003	Oricon Weekly Singles Chart	14	15,193	24,086	7 weeks
November 27, 2003	Oricon Monthly Singles Chart				
November 27, 2003	Oricon Yearly Singles Chart				
