= Message/Personal =

"Message"

Single by Aya Ueto

from the album Message
- A-side: "Personal" (double A-side)
- Released: May 14, 2003
- Genre: Pop
- Length: 4:37
- Label: Flight Master
- Songwriter(s): Yuho Iwasato; Hal
- Producer(s): Sin

Aya Ueto singles chronology
"Hello" (2003)	"Message" / "Personal" (2003)	"Kanshō" / "Mermaid" (2003)

Audio sample
- "Message": file; help

Audio sample
- "Personal": file; help

"Message" / "Personal" is a double A-side single by Japanese singer Aya Ueto off her second studio album, Message. It was released by Flight Master on May 14, 2003.

== Background ==
"Message" was written by Yuho Iwasato, composed by Hal, and arranged and produced by Sin. The song was used in commercials for Kao deodorant 8×4, starring Ueto herself. Ueto has stated that "Message" is one of her personal favorite songs of hers. The release of the single coincided with the start of Ueto's first concert tour, Ueto Aya First Live Tour Pureness 2003, and the premiere of her first feature film, Azumi.

"Personal" was written, composed, arranged and produced by T2ya. The song is composed in the key of B minor and set to a tempo of 92 beats per minute. Ueto's vocals span from A_{3} to D_{5}

== Chart performance ==
"Message" / "Personal" entered the daily Oricon Singles Chart at number 5, where it also peaked. The single debuted at number 10 on the weekly chart, selling 18,000 copies in the first week, and at number 9 on the SoundScan singles chart. "Message" / "Personal" charted on the Oricon Singles Chart for six weeks, selling a reported total of 28,000 copies during its run.

== Track listing ==
No.	Title	Writer(s)	Arranger(s)	Length
1.	"Message"	Yuho Iwasato; Hal	Sin	4:37
2.	"Personal"	T2ya	T2ya	4:54
3.	"Breath of My Heart" (Be Positive Mix)	Yōji Kubota; Miki Watabe	Kj; Nao	4:22
4.	"Message" (Instrumental)	Hal	Sin	4:37
5.	"Personal" (Instrumental)	T2ya	T2ya	4:51
Total length:				23:21

== Credits and personnel ==
=== "Message" ===
- Sin – producer, keyboards and programming
- Yūho Iwasato - songwriter
- HΛL - songwriter
- Hideyuki Fukasawa - synthesizer
- Kenji Suzuki - guitar
- Chieko Kinbara - strings
- Kumiko Yoshida - chorus
- Hironobu Asano – engineering, audio mixing
- Nao Yoshida - production coordinator

=== "Personal" ===
- T2ya – songwriter, producer, keyboards and programming
- Naoki Hayashibe - guitar
- Yumi Kawamura - chorus
- Yasuyuki Hara – engineering
- Jun'nosuke Sato – engineering
- Hironobu Asano – audio mixing

Credits adapted from Best of Uetoaya: Single Collection album liner notes.

== Charts ==
Chart (2003)	Peak position
Japan Daily Singles (Oricon)	5
Japan Weekly Singles (Oricon)	10
Japan Monthly Singles (Oricon)	37
Japan Weekly Singles (SoundScan) (CD/DVD)	9

== Sales ==
Region	Certification	Certified units/sales
Japan	—	28,000

== Release history ==
Region	Date	Format(s)	Label	Ref.
Japan	May 14, 2003	CD	Flight Master	
Taiwan	May 16, 2003	CD	Skyhigh Entertainment	
