= Aya Ueto =

Japanese singer and actress (born 1985)

- 上戸 彩
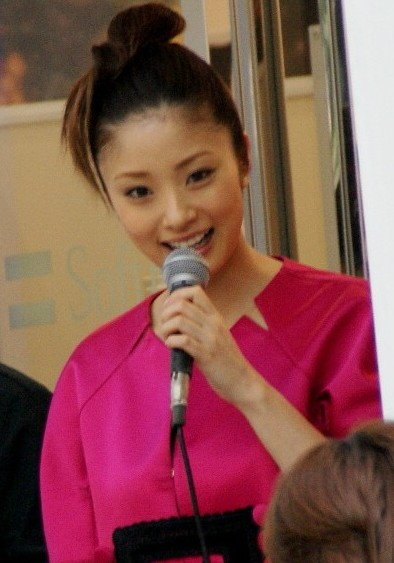
- Ueto attending the iPhone 3GS launch event at the SoftBank flagship store, June 2009
- Born: September 14, 1985 (age 40); Nerima, Tokyo, Japan
- Occupations: Actress; singer; television personality
- Years active: 1999–present
- Spouse: Hiroyuki Igarashi (m. 2012)
- Children: 3
- Musical career
- Genres: Pop; pop rock
- Instrument: Vocals
- Labels: Flight Master; Pony Canyon
- Formerly of: Z-1
- Website: Official website

Aya Ueto (上戸 彩, Ueto Aya; born September 14, 1985) is a Japanese actress, singer and television personality. In 1997, Ueto participated in the seventh Japan Bishōjo Contest, where she won the special jury prize. Soon thereafter, Ueto joined the talent agency Oscar Promotion and began taking singing, dancing and acting lessons. In 1999, she formed the girl group Z-1 with three fellow Japan Bishōjo Contest participants. The group disbanded in 2002 and later that year, Ueto signed with Pony Canyon and released "Pureness", her debut single as a lead artist. She has since released five studio albums which have spawned ten Oricon top-ten singles.

At the age of thirteen, Ueto made her acting debut in the 1999 thriller Satsujinsha: Killer of Paraiso. In 2001, Ueto appeared in the sixth season of the TBS drama 3-nen B-gumi Kinpachi-sensei. Her portrayal of a high school student with gender dysphoria garnered critical acclaim and led to several leading roles and advertising endorsements, establishing Ueto as one of Japan's most recognizable faces. Since 2004, Ueto has held the annual title of CM Queen five times. Ueto has won two Television Drama Academy Awards – one for Best Actress for her performance in the sports drama series Ace o Nerae! (2004) and one for Best Supporting Actress for her role in the human drama Nagareboshi (2010). She subsequently starred in the remake of Attention Please (2006), the banking drama Hanzawa Naoki (2013) and Hirugao: Love Affairs in the Afternoon (2014).

Ueto ventured onto the big screen as the lead in Ryuhei Kitamura's 2003 blockbuster Azumi, which earned her a nomination for a Japan Academy Award for Best Actress. She went on to star in its sequel, Azumi 2: Death or Love (2005), and Thermae Romae (2012), the adaptation of Mari Yamazaki's manga series of the same name. In 2017, Ueto starred in the feature film adaptation of the drama series Hirugao.

== Biography ==
Aya Ueto was born in Nerima, Tokyo. Her father is from Suttsu, Hokkaido, while her mother is from Ishigaki Island, Okinawa. Her parents divorced shortly after Ueto's debut. She is the middle of three children with an older brother, Shun, and younger brother Makoto. Despite growing up in a relatively poor household, Ueto studied piano, modern ballet, swimming and gymnastics.

== Career ==
She originally had no ambitions to become an entertainer; she instead wanted to become a pre-school teacher. After hearing about one of her friends' experience as an extra on a TV drama, she decided she too "wanted to appear on TV." Unbeknownst to her daughter, Ueto's mother entered her into the 7th Japan Bishōjo Contest. When she was twelve years old, Ueto won the special jury prize at the contest. She revealed later on that her real motivation for doing well was to "win the two million yen cash prize to buy a house for her family," however because what she won was an ad hoc prize decided that day, there was no monetary reward. After Ueto's discovery, she joined the talent agency Oscar Promotion and began acting and singing lessons. In July 1998, Ueto joined the idol group Z-1. The group landed a regular spot on the variety shows Kaishingeki TV! Utaemon and The Yoru mo Hippare, and debuted on Toshiba EMI a year later with the single "Vibe!" In 1999, Ueto obtained her first role in the film Satsujinsha: Killer of Paraiso, in which her lines were entirely in English.

=== 2000–2005: Breakthrough and solo debut ===
In 2000, Ueto portrayed the supporting role of Momo Fuchigami in the Fuji TV drama Namida o Fuite, starring Yōsuke Eguchi. The drama garnered strong ratings and gave Ueto her biggest exposure yet. In 2001, Ueto appeared on the annual Victor Kōshien poster, which, in the past, kick-started the careers of Noriko Sakai and Miho Kanno. Later that year, she was cast in the role of Nao Tsurumoto, a student suffering from gender identity disorder (GID), in the sixth season of the TBS drama 3-nen B-gumi Kinpachi-sensei. The role propelled her to stardom and earned her a Golden Arrow Award for Best Newcomer.

In January 2002, it was announced that Ueto would continue her music career as a solo artist under Pony Canyon subsidiary label, Flight Master. During her summer break from school, she appeared in a 5-episode arc of the long-running drama Wataru Seken wa Oni Bakari, and starred alongside Akiko Yada and Hiroshi Abe in the TBS drama My Little Chef. Ueto released her first solo single, "Pureness," in August 2002. The song debuted at number 4 on the Oricon Weekly Singles chart, making it the first debut single by a female artist with no commercial tie-in to enter the top five in three years. In between filming her first feature film, Azumi, Ueto released her second single, "Kizuna," and launched Seventeen's Map, a radio show on Nippon Hōsō. The program would go on to last four-and-a-half years, changing names after each of her birthdays to Eighteen's Road, Nineteen's Nine, Hatachi ni High Touch!, and 21 Peace!.

In early 2003, Ueto starred in a remake of the 1993 drama Kōkō Kyōshi, alongside Naohito Fujiki. She released her third single, "Hello," followed by her first studio album, Ayaueto. In April 2003, it was revealed that Ueto had taken a leave of absence from school to focus on her career. In a 2007 interview, she stated that, at the time, she was only getting two hours of sleep, trying to juggle work and school. In May 2003, Ueto launched her first tour, Ueto Aya First Live Tour Pureness 2003, released a fourth single, "Message/Personal," and Azumi opened nationwide. Ueto won several awards for her performance in Azumi. She swooped the Newcomer of the Year category of the Élan d'Or Awards, Japan Movie Critic Awards, Japanese Academy Awards, and Golden Arrow Awards; becoming the only actress to win two consecutive Golden Arrows for Newcomer of the Year. Ueto received a nomination for Outstanding Performance by an Actress in a Leading Role at the Japanese Academy Awards and won the Popularity Award. In July 2003, Ueto landed her first TV leading role in the TBS drama Hitonatsu no Papa e, for which her fifth single, Kanshō, served as theme song. Despite low ratings, the single was well received on the charts, peaking at number 9.

In January 2004, Ueto starred as Hiromi Oka in the live-action adaption of the popular manga Ace wo Nerae!. The drama earned her The Television Drama Academy Award for Best Lead Actress. Ueto's seventh single, "Ai no Tameni.," served as theme song for the drama and became her best-selling single. In March 2004, Message was released and became her best-selling album. In December 2004, Ueto released her third studio album, Re., starred alongside Ryūnosuke Kamiki in the film adaption of Risa Wataya's award-winning novel, Install, which premiered at the 17th Tokyo International Film Festival, and performed as top-batter at the 55th Kōhaku Uta Gassen. With eighteen advertising contracts for sixteen companies, Ueto was crowned CM Queen of 2004.

In 2005, Ueto appeared in the NHK taiga drama Yoshitsune, portrayed twin sisters in a remake of the drama Koto, and starred in the sequel to Azumi, Azumi 2: Death or Love. In April 2005, she starred in the TV Asahi-produced live-action adaption of another popular manga, Attack No. 1. "Yume no Chikara," the theme song for the drama, became her ninth top ten single. Ueto next starred in two TV movies produced to commemorate TBS' 50th anniversary: Misora Hibari Tanjō Monogatar, a Misora Hibari biopic co-starring Izumi Pinko, and Nada Sōsō, Kono Ai ni Ikite, co-starring Hitomi Kuroki. She launched her second tour, Ueto Aya Live Tour 2005: Genki Hatsu Ratsū?, released her twelfth single, "Kaze wo Ukete," and first remix album, Uetoayamix. Ueto was appointed mascot girl for the 2005 FIFA Club World Championship and covered the tournament as a special presenter for NTV.

=== 2006–2007 ===
In 2006, Ueto attended her Coming of Age ceremony, acted as special presenter for NTV's coverage of the 2006 Winter Olympics and made a guest appearance as herself in the anime Meitantei Conan, for which she was chosen as special supporter. She released her thirteenth single, "Egao no Mama de," followed by her fourth studio album, License. Ueto starred in Celeb, the first episode of the drama adaption of the cell phone novel Tsubasa no Oreta Tenshitachi. Her episode was the highest rated of the series. The drama marked Ueto's first appearance on a Fuji TV drama in six years, since Namida wo Fuite (2000). She starred alongside Ryo Nishikido in a modern-day remake of the 1970 drama, Attention Please, which became her most successful drama to date. It spawned two specials: Attention Please: Yōko, Hawaii ni Tobu (2007) and Attention Please: Sydney, Australia (2008). Ueto next starred in the Yukihiko Tsutsumi-directed comedy, Shimokita Sundays. In September 2006, Ueto released her first compilation album, Best of Uetoaya: Single Collection, which peaked at number 5. In December 2006, she hosted the 32nd Radio Charity Musicthon and acted as special presenter for NTV's coverage of the 2006 FIFA Club World Cup.

In 2007, Ueto starred in the two-part biopic of Yoshiko Yamaguchi, Ri Kōran. In March 2007, Ueto released "Way to Heaven," her first single in over a year, and made a guest appearance in the eighth-season finale of the TBS drama Wataru Seken wa Oni Bakari. In April 2007, Ueto was cast in a remake of the Korean drama Hotelier. The theme song, "Namida no Niji," was released in May 2007. The single marked Ueto's first foray into songwriting. In an interview with Oricon Style, she revealed that the reason she insisted on not writing her own lyrics until then was because she felt "shy" about "opening herself completely" to her audience. Ueto held her third tour, Ueto Aya Best Live Tour 2007 Never Ever, in the summer of 2007. At the release event of the concert DVD, she stated that the tour refreshed her after a year of ups and downs. Ueto next starred alongside Hideaki Itō in the TBS period piece Wachigaiya Itosato, and alongside Yō Ōizumi in the Fuji TV drama, Abarenbō Mama, which was well received by critics and audiences alike.

=== 2008–present ===
In 2008, Ueto won the Asakusa Entertainment Newcomer Prize, which is awarded to the most prominent entertainers based in Tokyo. She starred in her first NTV drama, Hokaben. In August 2008, Ueto became the first actress to ever appear on official postage stamps by releasing an original set with photos taken from her 2007 tour. She made a secret guest appearance at the 2008 Kobe Collection runway show, where she modeled for Emanuel Ungaro. In October 2008, Ueto next starred in her ninth TV drama leading role in the Fuji TV comedy Celeb to Binbō Taro, alongside Shūchishin member, Yūsuke Kamiji. Ueto attended the premiere of Saki Fukuda's first feature film Sakura no Sono, in which she makes a supporting appearance, at the 21st Tokyo International Film Festival. In December 2008, Ueto hosted two of the year's biggest festivities: the M-1 Grand Prix and 50th Japan Record Awards. She hosted the former for the third consecutive year.

In January 2009, Ueto launched her first wedding dress collection, in collaboration with bridal shop Joyful Eli, entitled U Aya Ueto Dresses. While she has designed her own tour merchandise in the past, namely the T-shirt line Buddy in 2005, U marks Ueto's first official foray into fashion design. A second collection was announced in July 2009. In April 2009, she starred alongside SMAP leader Masahiro Nakai in her first Getsuku drama, Konkatsu!. Ueto next co-starred with Hayato Ichihara in the Shunji Iwai-produced CG animation film, Baton, created in commemoration of the Port of Yokohama's 150th anniversary. The film, reunited her with Azumi director Ryuhei Kitamura. In June 2009, after a two-year hiatus, Ueto resumed her singing career by releasing the Kohmi Hirose-produced single "Smile for...," followed by her fifth studio album, Happy Magic: Smile Project. In November 2009, Ueto co-starred with Tetsuya Watari in the Sugako Hashida-written and Fukuko Ishii-produced TV movie, Kekkon.

In 2010, Ueto launched her third and fourth wedding dress collections, starred alongside Kin'ya Kitaōji in the Fuji TV drama Zettai Reido, and made a cameo appearance in Shun Oguri's directorial debut, Surely Someday. In August 2010, Ueto co-starred with Masaaki Uchino for the first time since Ace o Nerae! (2004) in her first NHK drama leading role, Jūnensaki mo Kimi ni Koishite. In September 2010, Ueto portrayed blind singer-songwriter Satoko Tatemichi in the TV movie Ai wa Mieru. Ueto next co-starred with Yutaka Takenouchi in her second Getsuku drama, Nagareboshi. The drama was very well received by critics and audiences alike and was the second best rated of the fall season. Ueto was nominated for Best Supporting Actress at the Nikkan Sports Drama Grand Prix and won the Television Drama Academy Award for her role in Nagareboshi. Boasting advertising contracts with 13 different companies, Ueto was crowned CM Queen for a second consecutive year, making it the fifth time she has held the title.

In February 2011, Ueto launched her fifth wedding dress collection. In July 2011, Ueto reprised the role of detective Izumi Sakuragi for a second season of Zettai Reido. Ueto was confirmed to appear in the series finale of the long-running drama Wataru Seken wa Oni Bakari, scheduled to air in September 2011. She will also star alongside Hiroshi Abe for the first time in ten years, since My Little Chef (2002), in the film adaptation of Thermae Romae (2012). Filming started in Rome on March 14 and is expected to finish in early May.

== Personal life ==
=== Relationship and marriage ===
Ueto dated Japanese singer and actor Gō Morita of the boy band V6 for eight years before splitting in April 2010. In October 2010, it was reported that she was in a relationship with Exile leader Hiro. In September 2012, Ueto announced via a handwritten letter posted on her official website that she and Hiro had registered their marriage on Ueto's 27th birthday.

Ueto and her husband welcomed the birth of their first child, a daughter, on August 19, 2015. Official news outlets announced that the couple had welcomed their second child, a son, on July 27, 2019. She gave birth to their third child and second son on June 22, 2023.

=== Philanthropy ===
In April 2011, Ueto joined veteran actors Tetsuya Watari and Hiroshi Tachi in handing out food and other relief supplies to disaster victims in the 2011 Tōhoku earthquake and tsunami-stricken area of Ishinomaki in Miyagi.

=== Other ===
Ueto is close friends with tarento and singer Becky. The pair have been appearing on television together since they met on the morning show Oha Star in 2000.

== Discography ==
Studio albums

- Ayaueto (2003)
- Message (2004)
- Re. (2004)
- License (2006)
- Happy Magic: Smile Project (2009)

== Filmography ==
=== Film ===
Title	Year	Role	Notes
Satsujinsha: Killer of Paraiso	1999	Hikari	
Azumi	2003	Azumi	Élan d'Or Award for Newcomer of the Year; Golden Arrow Award for Newcomer of the Year; Japan Academy Prize for Most Popular Performer; Japan Academy Prize for Newcomer of the Year; Japan Movie Critics Award for Newcomer of the Year; Nominated—Japan Academy Prize for Best Actress in a Leading Role
Install	2004	Asako Nozawa	
Azumi 2: Death or Love	2005	Azumi	
Ashita Genki ni Nāre!	2005	Kayōko	Voice
Piano no Mori	2007	Kai Ichinose	Voice
Sakura no Sono	2008	Rimi	
Baton	2009	Mikaru	
Surely Someday	2010	Herself	
Thermae Romae	2012	Mami Yamakoshi	Nominated—Hochi Film Award for Best Actress
Oshin	2013	Fuji Tanimura	
Bushi no Kondate	2013	Haru Funaki	Nominated—Japan Academy Prize for Best Actress in a Supporting Role
Thermae Romae II	2014	Mami Yamakoshi	
Hirugao: The Movie	2017	Sawa Sasamoto	Nominated—Hochi Film Award for Best Actress
Detective Conan: Zero the Enforcer	2018	Kyōko Tachibana	Voice
Shylock's Children	2023	Airi Kitagawa	
The Silent Service	2023	Hiromi Ichiya	
Anpanman: Baikinman and Lulun in the Picture Book	2024	Lulun	Voice
Ya Boy Kongming! The Movie	2025		Cameo
The Silent Service: The Battle of the Arctic Ocean †	2025	Hiromi Ichiya	
Sakamoto Days †	2026	Aoi Sakamoto	

=== Television ===
Title	Year	Role	Notes
Ultraman Gaia	1999	Herself (Z-1)	Episode 46
Namida o Fuite	2000	Momo Fuchigami	
Shijō Saiaku no Date	2001	Shiori	Episode 20
Yome wa Mitsuboshi	2001	Mayu Shinjō	
3-nen B-gumi Kinpachi-sensei	2001–2004	Nao Tsurumoto	Season 6 Season 7, episode 11; Golden Arrow Award for Newcomer of the Year; Hashida Award for Newcomer of the Year; TV Life Annual Drama Awards for Newcomer of the Year; Nominated—Nikkan Sports Drama Grand Prix for Best Supporting Actress
Wataru Seken wa Oni Bakari	2002–2011	Kana Kojima	Season 6, episodes 10–15; Season 8, episode 50; Season 10, series finale
My Little Chef	2002	Nazuna Kamosawa	
Kōkō Kyōshi 2003	2003	Hina Machida	Nominated—Nikkan Sports Drama Grand Prix for Best Supporting Actress
Hitonatsu no Papa e	2003	Marimo Mochizuki	Nominated—Nikkan Sports Drama Grand Prix for Best Lead Actress
Song of the Canefields	2003	Mie Hirayama	
Ace o Nerae!	2004	Hiromi Oka	9 episodes 1 special The Television Drama Academy Award for Best Lead Actress; Nominated—Nikkan Sports Drama Grand Prix for Best Lead Actress
Reikan Bus Guide Jikenbo	2004	Misaki Aoyama	Episode 3
Yoshitsune	2005	Utsubo	Nominated—Nikkan Sports Drama Grand Prix for Best Supporting Actress
Koto	2005	Chieko Sada/Naeko	
Attack No. 1	2005	Kozue Ayuhara	Nominated—Nikkan Sports Drama Grand Prix for Best Lead Actress
Misora Hibari Tanjō Monogatari	2005	Young Kazue Katō	
Nada Sōsō, Kono Ai ni Ikite	2005	Miki Oda	
Tsubasa no Oreta Tenshitachi	2006	Nanako Komine	Episode 1
Attention Please	2006–2008	Yōko Misaki	11 episodes 2 specials Nominated—Nikkan Sports Drama Grand Prix for Best Lead Actress
Meitantei Conan	2006	Herself	Episode 437
Shimokita Sundays	2006	Yuika Satonaka	
Ri Kouran	2007	Young Yoshiko Ōtaka	
Hotelier	2007	Kyoko Odagiri	
Wachigaiya Itosato	2007	Itosato	
Abarenbō Mama	2007	Ayu Kawano	Nominated—Nikkan Sports Drama Grand Prix for Best Lead Actress
Hokaben	2008	Akari Dōmoto	
Celeb to Binbō Taro	2008	Alice Mitazono	Nominated—Nikkan Sports Drama Grand Prix for Best Lead Actress
Konkatsu!	2009	Haruno Hida	Nominated—Nikkan Sports Drama Grand Prix for Best Supporting Actress
Kekkon	2009	Chikage Uehara	
Zettai Reido	2010–2018	Izumi Sakuragi	22 episodes (2010–2011); TBA (2018); 1 special Nominated—Nikkan Sports Drama Grand Prix for Best Lead Actress (2011–2012)
Jūnen Saki mo Kimi ni Koishite	2010	Rika Onozawa	
Ai wa Mieru: Zenmō Fūfu ni Yadotta Chiisana Inochi	2010	Juri Tatematsu	
Nagareboshi	2010	Risa Makihara	Nominated—Nikkan Sports Drama Grand Prix for Best Supporting Actress; The Television Drama Academy Award for Best Supporting Actress
Kaneko Misuzu Monogatari: Minna Chigatte Minna Ii	2012	Misuzu Kaneko	
Kuruma-isu de Boku wa Sora o Tobu	2012	Kumi Katō	
Itsuka Hi no Ataru Basho de	2013–2014	Hako Komoriya	10 episodes 1 special
Hanzawa Naoki	2013–2020	Hana Hanzawa	Season 1 (2013); Season 2 (2020); Nominated—Nikkan Sports Drama Grand Prix for Best Supporting Actress (2013)
Hirugao: Heijitsu Gogo Sanji no Koibitotachi	2014	Sawa Sasamoto	Nominated—Nikkan Sports Drama Grand Prix for Best Lead Actress
I'm Home	2015	Megumi Ieji	Nominated—Nikkan Sports Drama Grand Prix for Best Supporting Actress
Midnight Journal: Kieta Yūkaihan o Oe! Nananenme no Shinjitsu	2018	Yuri Fujise	
Taiyō o Aishita Hito: 1964 Ano Hi no Paralympics	2018	Hiroko Nakamura	
Boku ga Warau to	2019	Seiko Suzuki	
Tonari no Chikara	2022	Akari Nakagoshi	
Hitoribocchi Hito to Hito o Tsunagu Ai no Monogatari	2023	Chiaki Uchida	
The Silent Service	2024–2027	Hiromi Ichiya	2 seasons

=== Japanese dub ===
Title	Year	Role	Notes
Return to Never Land	2002	Jane	
Speed Racer	2008	Trixie	
Astro Boy	2009	Atom	
The Twilight Saga: Eclipse	2010	Bella Swan	
Maleficent	2014	Princess Aurora	
Zootopia	2016	Judy Hopps	
Maleficent: Mistress of Evil	2019	Princess Aurora	

=== Video games ===
Title	Year	Role	Notes
Rogue Galaxy	2005	Kisala	Voice

== Awards and nominations ==
=== Film and television ===
Year	Award	Category	Film / Series	Result	Ref.
2024	47th Japan Academy Film Prize	Best Supporting Actress	Shylock's Children	Nominated	
