= Pureness (Aya Ueto song) =

Single by Aya Ueto

from the album Ayaueto
- Released: August 28, 2002
- Genre: Pop rock
- Length: 4:06
- Label: Flight Master
- Songwriter(s): T2ya
- Producer(s): T2ya

Aya Ueto singles chronology
"Pureness" (2002)	"Kizuna" (2002)

Audio sample
- "Pureness": file; help

"Pureness" is a song recorded by Japanese singer Aya Ueto, from her debut studio album, Ayaueto. It was released through Pony Canyon's Flight Master imprint on August 28, 2002. The first pressing of the single included a DVD featuring the music video for "Pureness" and a special video message from Ueto.

== Background ==
After the disbandment of Z-1, Ueto signed with Pony Canyon to debut as a solo artist. Ueto initially declined the offer, but was persuaded by her talent agency. Her first single was scheduled for a May release, however, with Seiko Matsuda's daughter, Sayaka Kanda, also debuting around the same time, her management team decided to push back Ueto's debut and "Pureness" was subsequently postponed to August 2002. "Pureness" was chosen by Ueto and her team out of 600 songs. The song was written, composed, arranged and produced by T2ya. The look for the single's artwork and music video was based on Ueto's breakthrough role of Nao Tsurumoto on the TBS drama series 3-nen B-gumi Kinpachi-sensei.

== Live performances ==
On August 28, 2002, Ueto held a special event to commemorate her debut. The promotional event, held at Zepp Tokyo, attracted over 2,000 fans. Due to overwhelming fan demand, a second event took place at Zepp Osaka on September 15, 2002. Ueto's first televised performance of "Pureness" was on the NHK music program Pop Jam Summer Special. She also performed the song on Utaban and Hey! Hey! Hey! Music Champ. Ueto sang the song on live television on Music Station, as well as at their year-end concert Music Station Super Live 2002.

== Chart performance ==
"Pureness" entered the daily Oricon Singles Chart at number 5. The single rose to number-one on August 31, 2002. It peaked at number 4 on the weekly chart, with 46,000 copies sold in the first week, becoming the first debut single with no commercial tie-in by a female solo artist to reach the top five in over three years, since Kyoko Fukada's "Saigo no Kajitsu" (1999), which also debuted at number 4 and was coincidentally released by the same label. The single held onto the top ten on its second week, selling 20,000 copies. It fell to number 16 next, then number 18, dropping off from the top twenty on its fifth week. "Pureness" charted for eight weeks on the Oricon Singles Chart, selling a reported total of 96,000 copies during its run.

== Track listing ==
No.	Title	Writer(s)	Arranger(s)	Length
1.	"Pureness"	T2ya	T2ya	4:06
2.	"Breath of My Heart"	Yōji Kubota; Miki Watabe	Chokkaku	3:59
3.	"Puzzle"	Natsumi Kobayashi; Shinichirō Murayama	Murayama	3:42
4.	"Pureness" (Instrumental)	T2ya	T2ya	4:02
Total length:				15:49

First press DVD
No.	Title	Director(s)	Length
1.	"Pureness" (Video Clip)	Takehito Kobayashi
2.	"Pureness" (Making)
3.	"Message"

== Charts ==
Chart (2002)	Peak position
Japan Daily Singles (Oricon)	1
Japan Weekly Singles (Oricon)	4
Japan Monthly Singles (Oricon)	10
Japan Weekly Singles (SoundScan) (CD+DVD)	7
Japan Weekly Singles (SoundScan) (CD only)	15

== Sales ==
Region	Certification	Certified units/sales
Japan	—	96,000

== Release history ==
Region	Date	Format(s)	Label	Ref.
Japan	August 28, 2002	CD; CD/DVD	Flight Master	
Taiwan	January 17, 2003	CD	Skyhigh Entertainment	
