= Ketsumeishi =

Japanese musical group

Ketsumeishi ケツメイシ
- Origin: Japan
- Genres: Pop; hip hop; reggae; R&B; J-pop; dance
- Years active: 1993–present
- Labels: Toy's Factory (2001–2012); Avex Group (2012–present)
- Members: Ryo; Ryoji; Daizo; DJ Kohno
- Website: ketsume.com

Ketsumeishi (ケツメイシ) is a four-member Japanese pop and hip hop group that incorporates singing and rapping into their music. They have had several major hits in Japan, including "Sakura", which reached number two on the Oricon yearly chart for 2005 and was featured in the Japanese game Taiko no Tatsujin. Ketsumeishi is a Japanese word for a type of medical herbs made from the seeds of Senna obtusifolia, which is often used in Chinese medicine.

== Members ==
- Ryo Tanaka (田中 亮, Tanaka Ryō): Vocalist
- Ryoji Otsuka (大塚 亮二, Ōtsuka Ryōji): Vocalist
- Daizo Yoshida (吉田 大蔵, Yoshida Daizō): Vocalist
- Kenta Kohno (河野 健太, Kōno Kenta): DJ

== Discography ==
=== Albums ===
#	Title	Release date	Peak chart position (Oricon)
Independent
1	Ketsunopolis (ケツノポリス)	December 20, 2000	27
Major
1	Ketsunopolis 2 (ケツノポリス2)	April 3, 2002	1
2	Ketsunopolis 3 (ケツノポリス3)	October 1, 2003	1
3	Ketsunopolis 4 (ケツノポリス4)	June 29, 2005	1
4	Ketsunopolis 5 (ケツノポリス5)	August 29, 2007	1
5	Ketsunopolis 6 (ケツノポリス6)	June 25, 2008	3
6	Ketsunopolis 7 (ケツノポリス7)	March 16, 2011	1
7	Ketsunopolis 8	December 12, 2012	4
8	Ketsunopolis 9	July 23, 2014	2
9	Ketsunopolis 10	October 26, 2016	2
10	Ketsunopolis 11	October 24, 2018	1
11	Ketsunopolis 12	December 1, 2021	3
12	Ketsunopolis 13	January 31, 2024	3
13	Ketsunopolis 14	January 28, 2026	7
Compilation albums
1	Ketsu no Arashi (Haru Best)/Spring Best (ケツの嵐 〜春BEST〜)	December 21, 2011	2
2	Ketsu no Arashi (Natsu Best)/Summer Best (ケツの嵐 〜夏BEST〜)	December 21, 2011	4
3	Ketsu no Arashi (Aki Best)/Autumn Best (ケツの嵐 〜秋BEST〜)	December 21, 2011	5
4	Ketsu no Arashi (Fuyu Best)/Winter Best (ケツの嵐 〜冬BEST〜)	December 21, 2011	3

=== Singles ===
#	Title	Release date	Peak chart position (Oricon)
Indies
1	"Kocchi Oide" (こっちおいで)	December 15, 1999	91
2	"Shinseikatsu" (新生活)	April 25, 2000	–
3	"Umi" (海)	July 20, 2000	–
Major
1	"Familiar" (ファミリア)	April 25, 2001	36
2	"Yoru☆Kaze" (よる☆かぜ)	June 27, 2001	18
3	"Tegami" (手紙)	October 24, 2001	14
4	"Tomodachi" (トモダチ)	February 20, 2002	5
5	"Kachoufuugetsu" (花鳥風月)	September 26, 2002	4
6	"Hajimari no Aizu" (はじまりの合図)	January 8, 2003	2
7	"Natsu no Omoide" (夏の思い出)	July 6, 2003	3
8	"Taiyou" (太陽)	August 20, 2003	4
9	"Namida" (涙)	April 21, 2004	2
10	"Kimi ni BUMP" (君にBUMP)	July 28, 2004	2
11	"Sakura" (さくら)	February 16, 2005	1
12	"Tabiudo" (旅人)	April 26, 2006	1
13	"Danjo 6 Nin Natsu Monogatari" (男女6人夏物語)	July 19, 2006	3
14	"Train" (トレイン)	April 11, 2007	3
15	"Mata Kimi ni Aeru" (また君に会える)	June 27, 2007	2
16	"Seinaru Yoru ni/Fuyu Monogatari" (聖なる夜に/冬物語)	November 21, 2007	2
17	"Deai no Kakera" (出会いのかけら)	January 23, 2008	2
18	"Nakama" (仲間)	May 12, 2010	3
19	"Ofutari Summer" (お二人Summer)	July 21, 2010	3
20	"Tatakae! Salaryman" (闘え!サラリーマン)	November 17, 2010	12
21	"Ballad/Kimi to Tsukuru no Mirai" (バラード/キミとつくるの未来)	January 26, 2011	5
22	"Kodama" (こだま)	April 21, 2011	9
23	"LOVE LOVE Summer"	July 11, 2012	4
24	"moyamoya／guruguru"	November 14, 2012	10
25	"Tsuki to Taiyo" (月と太陽)	May 22, 2013	13
26	"Californie" (カリフォルニー)	March 12, 2014	6
27	"Rhythm of the Sun"	June 11, 2014	10
