= Ai no Tame ni. =

Single by Aya Ueto

from the album Message
- Released: February 4, 2004
- Recorded: 2003
- Genre: Pop
- Length: 5:08
- Label: Flight Master
- Songwriter: Tetsurō Oda
- Producer: Oda

Aya Ueto singles chronology
"Binetsu" (2003)	"Ai no Tame ni." (2004)	"Kaze/Okuru Kotoba" (2004)

Alternative cover
- Cover artwork for the limited edition

"Ai no Tame ni." (愛のために。; lit. "For the Sake of Love") is the seventh single by Japanese recording artist Aya Ueto. It was released on February 4, 2004 as the fourth and final single from Ueto's second studio album Message. The single was released in two formats: limited and standard editions, both issued with different covers.

== Overview ==
"Ai no Tame ni."
A 30-second sample of the second chorus of "Ai no Tame ni."

"Ai no Tame ni." was written, composed and produced by Tetsurō Oda, marking their first collaboration. The song served as theme song for the TV Asahi drama Ace o Nerae!, starring Ueto herself. Unlike her previous singles, which were all based on a darker, edgier concept, "Ai no Tame ni." is Ueto' first light-hearted, cheerful single. CDJournal described the song as a "fresh, juvenescent ska-pop track," while Barks complemented Oda for composing a song that fit the modern take of the drama on the original Ace o Nerae! manga perfectly.

The B-side, "Arigato," was also produced by Oda, and written by Oda protégé Akira Nakazawa. The single also includes a 1980s-inspired remix of "Binetsu."

== Chart performance ==
"Ai no Tame ni." debuted on the Oricon Daily Singles chart at number 7 on February 3, 2004 and climbed to number 4 on February 7, 2004. It peaked at number 6 on the Oricon Weekly Singles chart, with 31,006 copies sold in its first week. The single charted for fifteen weeks and has sold a total of 99,470 copies.

== Track listing ==
No.	Title	Lyrics	Music	Arranger(s)	Length
1.	"Ai no Tame ni." (愛のために。 "For the Sake of Love")	Tetsurō Oda	Oda	Oda	5:08
2.	"Arigato" (アリガト "Thank You")	Akira Nakazawa	Oda	Oda	4:06
3.	"Binetsu (1980 Boogie Style)"	Hiromasa Ijichi	Miki Watabe	Yasutaka Mizushima	6:06
4.	"Ai no Tame ni. (Instrumental)"		Oda	Oda	5:05
Total length:					20:25

== Charts, certifications and sales ==
=== Charts ===
Chart (2004)	Peak position
Oricon Daily Singles	4
Oricon Weekly Singles	6
Oricon Monthly Singles	18
Oricon Yearly Singles	94
SoundScan Japan Weekly Singles	8

=== Certifications and sales ===
Country	Certifications	Sales
Japan	Gold	99,470

== Release history ==
Region	Date	Format	Label
Japan	February 4, 2004	CD	Pony Canyon
Taiwan	February 10, 2004	CD	Pony Canyon
