= Anna Tsuchiya discography =

Number of albums/singles

- Studio albums: 4
- EPs: 2
- Compilation albums: 2
- Singles: 18
- Video albums: 2
- Remix albums: 2

The solo discography of Anna Tsuchiya features four studio albums, two compilation albums, two extended plays, two remix albums and 18 singles. These have all been released through Avex Group sublabel Mad Pray records, except for Nana Best, which was released under Cutting Edge.

== Studio albums ==
List of albums, with selected chart positions
Title	Album details	Peak positions		Sales
Title	Album details	JPN	TWN East Asian (Note: Position for Strip Me? was taken from 2006 week 32, Nudy Show! 2008 week 44.)	Sales
Strip Me?	Released: August 2, 2006; Label: Mad Pray Records; Formats: CD, CD/DVD, digital download	11	12	50,000
Anna Tsuchiya Inspi' Nana (Black Stones)	Released: February 28, 2007; Label: Mad Pray; Formats: CD, digital download	17	—	18,000
Nudy Show!	Released: October 29, 2008; Label: Mad Pray; Formats: CD, CD+DVD, digital download	10	7	47,000
Rule	Released: September 22, 2010; Label: Mad Pray; Formats: CD, CD+DVD, digital download	18	—	11,000

== Extended plays ==
List of albums, with selected chart positions
Title	Album details	Peak positions	Sales
Title	Album details	JPN	Sales
Taste My Beat	Released: August 24, 2005; Label: Mad Pray; Formats: CD, digital download	28	21,000
Sugar Palm	Released: March 11, 2014; Label: Mad Pray; Formats: CD+DVD, digital download	279	300
Lucifer	Released: October 22, 2014; Label: Mad Pray; Formats: CD, CD+DVD, digital download	170	500
Nake'd: Soul Issue	Cover album; Collaboration with The Groobeees; Released: December 2, 2015; Label: Mad Pray; Formats: CD, CD+DVD, digital download	—	

== Compilation albums ==
List of albums, with selected chart positions
Title	Album details	Peak positions			Sales
Title	Album details	JPN	TWN	TWN East Asian (Note: Position for Nana Best was taken from 2007 week 21.)	Sales
Nana Best	Split compilation album with Olivia; Released: March 21, 2007; Label: Cutting Edge; Formats: CD, CD+DVD, digital download	20	—	3	21,000
12 Flavor Songs: Best Collaboration	Collaborations compilation album; Released: March 28, 2012; Label: Mad Pray; Formats: CD, CD+DVD, digital download	104	—	—	1,000
COVER BEST	Cover best album; Released: April 22, 2015; Label: Mad Pray; Formats: digital download	—	—	—	

== Live albums ==
List of albums, with selected chart positions
Title	Album details	Peak positions	Sales
Title	Album details	JPN	Sales
The 15th Anniversary Live Tour「COLORS」Set List Songs	Released: December 25, 2017; Label: Mad Pray; Formats: digital download	—	

== Remix albums ==
List of albums, with selected chart positions
Title	Album details	Peak positions	Sales
Title	Album details	JPN	Sales
Taste My Xxxremixxxxxxx!!!!!!!! Beat Life!	Released: March 23, 2006; Label: Mad Pray; Formats: CD+DVD, digital download	124	5,000
Nudy xxxremixxxxxxx!!!!!!!! Show!	Released: March 11, 2009; Label: Mad Pray; Formats: CD, digital download	114	1,000

== Singles ==
=== As a lead artist ===
List of singles, with selected chart positions
Title	Year	Peak chart positions			Sales	Certifications	Album
Title	Year	Oricon Singles Charts	Billboard Japan Hot 100 (Note: The Japan Hot 100 was established in February 2008.) (Note: Sources for chart positions are as follows: "Cocoon", "Crazy World", "Virgin Cat", "Ginger", "Brave Vibration", "Atashi", "Bōshoku-kei Danshi!!", "Believe in Love"; "Wonder Woman", "Stayin' Alive", "Switch On!", "Halloween Party", "Step in to the New World!".)	TWN East Asian (Note: Position for "Brave Vibration" was taken from 2009 week 28.)	Sales	Certifications	Album
"Change Your Life"	2006	35	—	—	9,000		Strip Me?
"Slap that Naughty Body"	2006	35	—	—	4,000		Strip Me?
"My Fate"	2006	35	—	—	4,000		Strip Me?
"Rose" (Anna inspi' Nana (Black Stones))	2006	6	—	—	54,000		Strip Me?
"Kuroi Namida" (黒い涙; "Black Tears") (Anna Tsuchiya inspi' Nana (Black Stones))	2007	7	—	—	20,000		Anna Tsuchiya Inspi' Nana (Black Stones)
"Lucy" (Anna Tsuchiya inspi' Nana (Black Stones))	2007	18	—	—	13,000		Anna Tsuchiya Inspi' Nana (Black Stones)
"Bubble Trip"	2007	21	— (Note: Charted at number 37 on the Billboard Adult Contemporary Airplay chart in 2008.)	—	14,000		Nudy Show!
"Sweet Sweet Song"	2007	21	—	—	14,000		Non-album single
"Cocoon"	2008	19	49	—	7,000		Nudy Show!
"Crazy World" (featuring Ai)	2008	19	26	—	13,000	RIAJ (download): Gold	Nudy Show!
"Virgin Cat"	2008	39	45	—	3,000		Nudy Show!
"Brave Vibration"	2009	13	11	20	7,000	RIAJ (download): Gold	Rule
"Atashi" ("Me")	2010	68	88	—	2,000		Rule
"Shout in the Rain"	2010	68	— (Note: Charted at number 74 on the Billboard Hot Single Sales chart.)	—	1,000		Rule
Unchained Girl (Note: Triple A-side single featuring the songs "Stayin' Alive", "Juicy Girl" and "Master Blaster".)	2011	62	—	—	1,000		Non-album singles
"Switch On!"	2011	13	24	—	30,000	RIAJ (cellphone): Gold	Non-album singles
"Voyagers"	2012	61	—	—	2,000		Non-album singles
"Step in to the New World!" (Anna Tsuchiya Aiaigasa Kishidan (土屋アンナ＜愛愛傘＞氣志團))	2013	50	29	—	1,000		Non-album singles

=== As a collaborating artist ===
List of singles, with selected chart positions
Title	Year	Peak chart positions		Sales	Certifications	Album
Title	Year	Oricon Singles Charts	Billboard Japan Hot 100	Sales	Certifications	Album
"Uha-Uha" (Note: Released as a magazine.) (Pe'z x Anna Tsuchiya)	2010	—	—			Non-album single
"Bōshoku-kei Danshi!!" (暴食系男子!!; "Over-eating Boys!!") (Pe'z x Anna Tsuchiya)	2010	—	82			Rule
"Wonder Woman" (Namie Amuro featuring Ai and Anna Tsuchiya)	2011	—	5		RIAJ (download): Platinum	Checkmate!
"Halloween Party" (among Halloween Junky Orchestra)	2012	3	3	138,000	RIAJ (physical): Gold	Non-album single
"Beni no Prologue" (紅のプロローグ; "Crimson Prologue") (among And Roses)	2016	—	—			Non-album single

=== Promotional singles ===
Title	Year	Peak chart positions	Album
Title	Year	Billboard Japan Hot 100	Album
"Taste My Skin"	2005	—	Taste My Beat
"Ah Ah (Shinichi Osawa Remix)"	2006	—	Taste My Remix
"Ginger" (featuring Monkey Majik)	2008	14	Nudy Show!
"Guilty"	2008	—	Resident Evil: Degeneration Original Soundtrack
"Lucy (Digiping Panda Mix)"	2009	—	Nudy Remix
"Sing" (Note: Sesame Street/The Carpenters cover.)	2009	—	Non-album single
"Believe in Love"	2010	46	Rule
"Checkmate" (mash up Anty the Kunoichi, Volta Masters)	2011	—	12 Flavor Songs
"Stayin' Alive"	2011	77	"Unchained Girl" (single)
"Juicy Girl" (featuring The Samos)	2011	—	"Unchained Girl" (single)
"Is This Love?"	2012	—	12 Flavor Songs
"Sugar Palm"	2014	—	Sugar Palm
"Lucifer"	2014	—	Lucifer

== Video albums ==
List of media, with selected chart positions
Title	Album details	Peak positions
Title	Album details	JPN
Anna^{3}	Documentary; Released: June 16, 2004; Label: Pony Canyon; Formats: DVD	—
Anna Tsuchiya 1st Live Tour Blood of Roses	Released: January 10, 2007; Label: May Pray; Formats: DVD	37
Blue Pacific Stories: Fish Bone	Tsuchiya directed short film Fish Bone and live concert; Released: March 17, 2010; Label: May Pray; Formats: DVD	—

== Other appearances ==
List of non-studio album or guest appearances that feature Anna Tsuchiya. Some collaborations were compiled on 12 Flavor Songs (2012).
Title	Year	Album
"My Dear"	2006	Tribute to Brian Jones
"Butterfly (Don't Let My Sun Go Down)" (Fake?)	2006	Marilyn Is a Bubble
"Queen of the Rock" (Hotei vs Anna Tsuchiya)	2006	Soul Sessions
"Butterfly" (Ai featuring Anty the Kunoichi, Anna Tsuchiya, Pushim)	2007	Don't Stop Ai
"Butterfly" (live) (Ai featuring Anty the Kunoichi, Anna Tsuchiya, Pushim)	2008	Don't Stop Ai Japan Tour (Note: Live DVD concert release.)
"Bangalicious" (Ravex featuring Anna Tsuchiya)	2009	Trax
"The Letter" (Hoobastank featuring Anna Tsuchiya)	2009	The Greatest Hits: Don't Touch My Moustache (Deluxe Edition)
"Dirty Beauty" (S'capade featuring Anna Tsuchiya)	2010	S'capade
"Revolution" (Infinity 16 welcomez Anna Tsuchiya)	2010	Love
"Fight the Power" (Volta Masters featuring Anna Tsuchiya, Sadat X from Brand Nubian, Steph Pockets, Sonny Cheeba from Camp Lo)	2011	Suite
"S.ex." (Seamo with Anna Tsuchiya and Shikao Suga)	2011	Collabo Denssetsu
"Butterfly" (live) (Ai featuring Anty the Kunoichi, Anna Tsuchiya, Pushim)	2011	Densetsu Night (Note: Live DVD/Blu-ray concert release.)
"Switch On!" (live)	2012	Kamen Riden Tanjō 40 Shūnen Anniversary Live & Show (Note: Live DVD/Blu-ray concert release.)
"Sail Away" (Oblivion Dust featuring Anna Tsuchiya)	2012	9 Gates for Bipolar
"No Options" (Inoran featuring Anna Tsuchiya)	2012	Dive Youth, Sonik Dive
"Voyagers" (live)	2013	Chōeiyūsai Kamen Rider x Super Sentai Live & Show 2013 (Note: Live DVD.)
"Switch On!" (live)	2013	Chōeiyūsai Kamen Rider x Super Sentai Live & Show 2013
"Life Is Showtime" (live)	2013	Chōeiyūsai Kamen Rider x Super Sentai Live & Show 2013
"Switch On!" (live)	2014	Animelo Summer Live 2013: Flag Nine 8.24 (Note: Live DVD/Blu-ray concert release.)
