= Nana Best =

2007 compilation album by Anna Tsuchiya and Olivia

Compilation album by Anna Tsuchiya Inspi' Nana (Black Stones) Olivia Inspi' Reira (Trapnest)
- Released: March 21, 2007
- Languages: Japanese, English
- Label: Cutting Edge (Avex)

Nana Best is a special compilation album featuring the combined words of Anna Tsuchiya and Olivia used in the first season of the Nana anime.

== Release versions ==
The album was released in two versions, CD+DVD and the low priced CD only version. The albums were released only one month after the release of two full-albums dedicated solely to one singer each's work for the anime respectively.

The first press of the CD+DVD version includes a special Nana mouse pad as well as a "skeleton"-style sleeve package. The best album features five tracks that solely appear on the best album, namely "Stand By Me" - the fifth ED theme for Nana by Anna Tsuchiya, Tsuchiya's cover of the Sex Pistols`s Anarchy in the U.K., a "Studio Live Version" of Tsuchiya's Lucy, a new song from Olivia called "Nothing's Gonna Take My Love" and finally a live recording of the song "Recorded Butterflies" by Olivia.

The DVD features all of the opening and ending sequences used in Nana without credits overtop of them, as well as four "original animation" clips set to music throughout the show. This album was released one week before the airing of the final episode of the first season of the Nana anime.

== Track listing ==
Disc1: CD
No.	Title	Lyrics	Music	Arranger(s)	Length
1.	"Rose -1st opening song-"	ANNA	Ayumi Miyazaki	Ayumi Miyazaki	3:49
2.	"A Little Pain -1st ending song-"	Olivia, Masumi Kawamura	Hiroo Yamaguchi	Tomoji Sogawa	5:17
3.	"Zero -Inserted song-"	ANNA	Katsumi Onishi	Katsumi Onishi	3:50
4.	"Wish -2nd opening song-"	Olivia, Chazne	Olivia, rui	rui, kansei, Tomoji Sogawa	3:45
5.	"Starless Night -2nd ending song-"	Olivia, SPACE CRITTER	Hideyuki Obata	Tomoji Sogawa	4:16
6.	"Kuroi Namida -3rd ending song-"	Megumi Takeuchi	Hiroki Nagase	Gary Newby	5:10
7.	"Lucy -3rd opening song-"	ANNA, Rie Eto	COZZi	COZZi	3:29
8.	"Stand By Me -5th ending song-"	Katsumi Onishi	Katsumi Onishi		4:48
9.	"Shadow of Love -Inserted song-"	Chazne, OLIVIA	rui, OLIVIA	kansei, rui	4:25
10.	"Winter Sleep -4th ending song-"	Eclipse	rui, OLIVIA	kansei, rui	6:00
11.	"Anarchy in the U.K. <Nana Best Special Tracks>"	Paul Thomas Cook, Stephen Philip Jones, Glen Matlock, Johnny Rotten	Paul Thomas Cook, Stephen Philip Jones, Johnny Rotten		3:23
12.	"Lucy ~Studio Live Version~ <Nana Best Special Tracks>"	ANNA, Rie Eto	COZZi	COZZi	3:32
13.	"Nothing's Gonna Take My Love <Nana Best Special Tracks>"	OLIVIA	OLIVIA, Jeffrey Lufkin	kansei, rui	4:33
14.	"Recorded Butterflies ~Live Version~ <Nana Best Special Tracks>"	OLIVIA, Masumi Kawamura	OLIVIA, rui		4:57

- Anna Tsuchiya Inspi' Nana (Black Stones) - 1, 3, 6, 7, 8, 11, 12
- Olivia Inspi' Reira (Trapnest) - 2, 4, 5, 9, 10, 13, 14

Disc2: DVD (TV Animation Nana Non-telop Opening & Ending Clips)
No.	Title	Length
1.	"Rose"	3:48
2.	"A Little Pain"	5:17
3.	"Wish"	3:46
4.	"Starless Night"	4:15
5.	"Kuroi Namida"	5:09
6.	"Lucy"	3:28
7.	"Stand by Me"	4:48
8.	"Winter Sleep"	5:57

Disc2: DVD (Nana Original Animation Clips)
No.	Title	Length
9.	"Kuroi Namida"	5:09
10.	"Lucy"	3:28
11.	"A Little Pain: Studio Live"	5:17
12.	"Wish"	3:46

- Anna Tsuchiya Inspi' Nana (Black Stones) - 1, 5, 6, 7, 9, 10
- Olivia Inspi' Reira (Trapnest) - 2, 3, 4, 8, 11, 12
