= List of Nana episodes =

This is a list of episodes of Japanese anime television series Nana, based on a manga of the same name, which premiered in 2006 with 47 episodes total.

All vocal songs featured in the show were performed by Anna Tsuchiya, who provided Nana Osaki's singing voice, and Olivia Lufkin, who provided Reira Serizawa's singing voice. They were credited as "Anna Tsuchiya inspi' Nana (Black Stones)" and "Olivia inspi' Reira (Trapnest)" respectively. The opening theme songs are "Rose" by Tsuchiya (episodes 1–21.5), "Wish" by Lufkin (episodes 22–36.5), and "Lucy" by Tsuchiya (episodes 37–47). The ending theme songs are "A Little Pain" by Lufkin (episodes 1–17), "Starless Night" by Lufkin (episodes 18–29, 40–42), "Kuroi Namida" by Tsuchiya (episodes 30–39 and 47), "Winter Sleep" by Lufkin (episodes 43 and 44) and "Stand by Me" by Tsuchiya (episodes 45 and 46). The first episode aired to a 6.2% audience share in Japan.

The anime has been licensed for a North American release by Viz Media, which they first announced at San Diego Comic-Con in 2007. It was first available in North America on the Funimation Channel. A dubbed version was later added to iTunes. The first eleven episodes were released with subtitles on Hulu prior to a DVD release. The first English DVD box set was released on September 8, 2009, while the second was released two months later on November 24.

== Episodes ==
No.	Title	Directed by	Written by	Original release date
1	"Prologue: Nana K. and Nana O."; Transliteration: "Joshō: Nana to Nana" (Japanese: 序章・奈々とナナ)	Morio Asaka; Ryōsuke Nakamura	Tomoko Konparu	April 5, 2006
In 2001, Nana K. receives news that her boyfriend, Shoji, has passed his university entrance exams, and, as they had promised, she moves to Tokyo to be with him. On the train, she meets Nana O. and learns they have many things in common, such as their names and age. The next day, Nana K. runs into her again while searching for a new apartment. Despite Nana O. already having plans to rent room 707, she is convinced to share it with Nana K. as her roommate to split the cost of the rent.
2	"Love? Friendship? Nana K. and Shoji"; Transliteration: "Koi? Yūjō? Nana to Shōji" (Japanese: 恋？友情？奈々と章司)	Shigetaka Ikeda	Tomoko Konparu	April 12, 2006
In 1999, during high school, Nana K. begins a secret relationship with a married salaryman, Takashi Asano, but they break up before she graduates because his job is transferring to Tokyo. Nana K. and her friend, Junko, begin attending an art school, where Junko is reunited with her junior high school friend, Shoji, and begins dating their friend, Kyosuke. Nana K. falls in love with Shoji, but due to her bad luck in love and the fact that she's never had male friends, she decides that she wants to be friends with him instead. Shoji, however, secretly admits that he is in love with Nana K.
3	"Nana K. and Shoji, Love's Whereabouts"; Transliteration: "Nana to Shōji, koi no yukue" (Japanese: 奈々と章司、恋の行方)	Tsuyoshi Matsumoto	Tomoko Konparu	April 19, 2006
Junko and Kyosuke become closer, while Nana K. spends more time with Shoji. Junko announces her plans to attend an art university in Tokyo, with Kyosuke following. Nana K. and Shoji fail their entrance exams, but, during a trip to Tokyo, Shoji discloses that he plans on retaking the exam the next year. Nana K. becomes desperate to join them, but Shoji becomes frustrated with both her lack of direction and for treating him as a convenience. Alone, Nana K. discovers she cannot find her way back to the hotel until she runs into Takashi. Through their conversation, Nana K. realizes that she truly was in love with Takashi and that she has not matured. After parting ways from him, she receives a call from Kyosuke revealing that Junko and Shoji are looking for her, and that Shoji is in love with her.
4	"Nana K.'s Love, Nana O.'s Dream"; Transliteration: "Nana no Koi, Nana no Yume" (Japanese: 奈々の恋、ナナの夢)	Atsuko Ishizuka	Tomoko Konparu; Tatsuhiko Urahata	April 26, 2006
After returning to the hotel, Nana K. makes up with Shoji, and the two begin a relationship. Meanwhile, Nana O. finishes a concert with her band, Black Stones. She recalls the time when she first met Ren, her boyfriend and the bassist of the band, as well as how Black Stones was formed. As the two spend time together, Ren suddenly tells Nana O. that he plans on moving to Tokyo.
5	"Ren's Dream, Nana O.'s Feelings"; Transliteration: "Ren no Yume, Nana no Omoi" (Japanese: レンの夢、ナナの思い)	Kanji Wakabayashi; Kōjirō Tsuruoka	Tatsuhiko Urahata	May 3, 2006
Yasu, the drummer of Black Stones, reveals to Nobu, the band's guitarist, that Ren received an offer to play the guitar for Trapnest, a band consisting of their friends who will also be making a major label debut. As Black Stones' future is uncertain, Yasu quits to continue his lawyer internship while Nana O. decides to break up with Ren, as she wants to succeed on her own merit instead of her status as Ren's girlfriend. The band breaks up and see Ren off at the train station.
6	"Snowing in Tokyo! Nana and NANA"; Transliteration: "Yuki no jōkyō! Nana to NANA" (Japanese: 雪の上京！奈々とナナ)	Nanako Shimazaki	Tomoko Konparu	May 10, 2006
This episode is a repeat of episode 1 with additional scenes.
7	"Yasu Appears! Room No. 707"; Transliteration: "Yasu Tōjō! 707-gō Shitsu" (Japanese: ヤス登場！707号室)	Mayumi Ikeda	Tomoko Konparu	May 17, 2006
In 2001, Nana K. runs into Nana O. while searching for an apartment, and despite Nana O. already having plans to rent room 707, she decides to share it with Nana K. to split the cost of the rent. Junko and Shoji become worried about Nana K. rooming with Nana O. as they hardly know each other, and Shoji even offers Nana K. to live with him. Nana K., however, insists she lives apart from Shoji in order to stop relying on him, though she begins to have delusions he may be cheating on her with an imaginary girl she names "Sachiko." While Junko, Kyosuke, and Shoji help Nana K. move into her new apartment, they meet Yasu. Relieved by how reliable he is, Nana K.'s friends accept her living conditions.
8	"Strawberry Glass and Ren-Lotus Flower"; Transliteration: "Ichigo Gurasu to Ren no Hana" (Japanese: いちごグラスと蓮の花)	Shūichi Hirokawa	Tatsuhiko Urahata	May 24, 2006
As Nana K. and Nana O. move into room 707, they go shopping for furniture and home goods, with Nana O. nicknaming Nana K. "Hachi." While shopping at the vintage store Sabrina, Nana K. asks the manager, Mizukoshi, for a job. When Nana K. goes to a music store to buy Trapnest's latest CD, Nana O. is surprised when she sees their poster, as Ren is pictured still wearing the Sid Vicious padlock necklace that she gave him. At night, Nana K. rejects Shoji's advances in order to bring home food for Nana O.
9	"Nobu Arrives in Tokyo! Nana's Song"; Transliteration: "Nobu Jōkyō! Nana no Uta" (Japanese: ノブ上京！ナナの歌)	Shigetaka Ikeda	Tatsuhiko Urahata	May 31, 2006
Nana K. and Nana O. spend their first morning together. Junko visits Nana K. at Sabrina on her first day of work, but, after noticing that Nana K. is attracted to Mizukoshi, she reminds her to stay faithful to Shoji. At night, Nobu visits room 707 to deliver Nana O.'s furniture and asks to let him stay for the night, as he has run away from home against his parents' wishes, who want him to inherit their family's inn. Nobu is set on reviving Black Stones, and though Nana O. initially refuses, she decides to sing at Nana K.'s request and agrees to reform the band.
10	"The Pretty Boy Shin Appears!"; Transliteration: "Bishōnen Shin tōjō!" (Japanese: 美少年シン登場！)	Kanji Wakabayashi	Tatsuhiko Urahata	June 7, 2006
After the neighbors complain at Nana O. and Nobu's impromptu concert, Nana K. mistakenly believes there is a ghost in room 707 and begs to sleep with Nana O. for the night while Nobu sleeps in her bed. The next day, Shoji tells Nana K. that they cannot spend time together due to school and him working extra hours. While Nobu hopes for Yasu to return as the drummer, Nana K. helps Black Stones recruit a new bassist, a boy named Shin, who also helps them find a studio for them to play in. Despite initial reservations, Nana O. accepts him into the band after noticing his playing style resembled Ren's. Later, Shoji is asked to train a new hire at his job, coincidentally named Sachiko. While he helps her home, he realizes that she is attracted to him.
11	"Sachiko Did It on Purpose?"; Transliteration: "Sachiko, wazato da yo?" (Japanese: 幸子、わざとだよ？)	Mayumi Ikeda	Tatsuhiko Urahata	June 14, 2006
After overspending on clothes and furniture, Nana K. is left with ¥2,200. In addition, Mizukoshi informs her that he will be closing down Sabrina, leaving her without a job. Meanwhile, Shoji begins inadvertently running into Sachiko several times after finding out they attend the same university and when she purposely misses the last train to spend time with him. While begging her friends for money, Nana K. finds out that her mother had deposited ¥30,000 into her bank account, allowing her to stay in Tokyo in the meantime. Nana O. and Nana K. return home to find that Yasu has decided to rejoin Black Stones as their drummer.
11.5	"Junko's Room 1"; Transliteration: "Junko no Heya (1)" (Japanese: 淳子の部屋（1）)	Ryōsuke Nakamura	Tomoko Konparu	June 21, 2006
In a segment called Junko's Room, Junko hosts a recap of the first 11 episodes with commentary from herself, Kyosuke, and Shoji.
12	"Quick Intimacy! Shoji and Sachiko"; Transliteration: "Kyūsekkin! Shōji to Sachiko" (Japanese: 急接近！章司と幸子)	Tōru Takahashi	Tatsuhiko Urahata	June 28, 2006
After being told by her mother to stay in Tokyo, Nana K. is determined to work towards a happy married life with Shoji in the future and applies for a job at a publishing company. Meanwhile, Shoji grows closer to Sachiko in spite of struggling to stay loyal to Nana K., and even with advice from Junko, he finds himself unable to put limits onto their relationship. Realizing his uneasiness, Sachiko confesses to Shoji that she wants to be with him and the two sleep together.
13	"Sachiko's Tears, Shoji's Determination"; Transliteration: "Sachiko no Namida, Shōji no Kesshin" (Japanese: 幸子の涙、章司の決心)	Yū Kozakai	Tatsuhiko Urahata	July 5, 2006
Nana K. begins working for the publishing company, while the Black Stones book a show at a nightclub. Meanwhile, Shoji becomes torn about between Nana K. and Sachiko and seeks Kyosuke for advice. In the evening, he realizes that he has grown so fond of Sachiko that he promises to spend Children's Day with Sachiko for her birthday despite Black Stones' concert taking place on the same evening. Nana K. decides to surprise Shoji by visiting the diner he works at with Nana O. and Shin. When Sachiko accidentally breaks a glass, Nana K. helps her, and, guilty, she asks Shoji to end their secret affair.
14	"The Diner of Carnage"; Transliteration: "Shuraba no FamiResu" (Japanese: 修羅場のファミレス)	Katsuyoshi Yatabe; Hiroshi Kugimiya	Kazuyuki Fudeyasu	July 12, 2006
Nana K. and Nana O. wait for Shoji after his shift is over, but Shoji decides to break up with Nana K. to be with Sachiko. Nana K. is shocked upon finding out Shoji has been cheating on her, and she is comforted by Nana O. for the rest of the evening. Junko visits in the morning to check on Nana K., but she takes a neutral position and reveals that there were already growing issues in their relationship that eventually led to their break-up. At night, Nana K.'s mood lifts when her mother forwards her tickets to Trapnest's concert, believing them to be a blessing from Ren.
15	"Blast's First Live Concert"; Transliteration: "Burasuto, Hatsu Raibu" (Japanese: ブラスト、初ライブ)	Daisuke Chiba	Kazuyuki Fudeyasu	July 19, 2006
In the aftermath of Nana K. and Shoji's break-up, Junko feels guilty over giving harsh advice to Nana K. but to her surprise, Nana K. is excited for Trapnest's concert and asks for a friend to attend with her. Despite a lukewarm reception, Black Stones puts on a successful performance thanks to Misato, a fan from Nana O.'s hometown, rallying the crowd. Still feeling lonely after her break-up, Nana K. becomes jealous of Nana O. and Misato's close friendship and vents her frustration on them.
16	"Nana O.'s Love Whereabouts"; Transliteration: "Nana no Koi no Yukue" (Japanese: ナナの恋の行方)	Shigetaka Ikeda	Kazuyuki Fudeyasu	July 26, 2006
Troubled, Nana O. visits Yasu. The next morning, Nana K. and Nana O. apologize. When Nana K. calls Misato to apologize, she learns that Ren used to play bass for Black Stones. She comes to the conclusion that Nana O. and Ren were once close, and, curious, she and Shin ask Nobu for more information. Nobu confirms that the two were in a relationship before breaking up after Ren was recruited to join Trapnest. At night, Nana O. accepts Nana K.'s offer to go to Trapnest's concert with her. Meanwhile, Ren visits Yasu.
17	"Trapnest, Live"; Transliteration: "Toranesu, Raibu" (Japanese: トラネス、ライブ)	Tōru Takahashi; Atsuko Ishizuka	Kazuyuki Fudeyasu	August 2, 2006
On May 26, 2001, Nana K. returns to her hometown with Nana O. to go to Trapnest's concert. While visiting Nana K.'s family, Nana O. talks about her childhood for the first time, revealing that she grew up with her grandmother after her mother abandoned her and her father died. When Nana K. asks Nana O. if she is still in love with Ren, she admits so. At the venue, Nana O. arrives in the hall a few minutes after the concert begins. As both women watch Ren perform, they are moved to tears.
18	"Hachi's Prayer, Nana's Feelings"; Transliteration: "Hachi no Inori, Nana no Omoi" (Japanese: ハチの祈り、ナナの想い)	Atsuko Ishizuka	Kazuyuki Fudeyasu	August 9, 2006
Nana O. believes that Ren had been unable to see her because of the stage lights, but, backstage, Ren calls Yasu in panic after seeing her. To urge Nana O. and Ren to talk to each other, Yasu gives Ren Nana K.'s cell phone number while threatening to take Nana O. if he doesn't contact her; he also tells Nana O. to find closure in her relationship with Ren by returning the keys to his apartment and his padlock necklace. Nana O. visits Ren's hotel suite with the intent of ending their relationship for good, but she is at loss when Ren confesses he's still in love with her and gives into him.
19	"Nana's Treat"; Transliteration: "Nana no Gohōbi" (Japanese: ナナのごほうび)	Yū Kozakai	Tomoko Konparu	August 16, 2006
The next morning, Nana O. thanks Nana K. for helping her reunite with Ren and offers her a reward, to which Nana K. requests Takumi's autograph. Inspired by Nana O. and Ren's relationship, Nana K. tells Junko and Kyosuke that she wants to have a boyfriend again. When the two suggests the members of Black Stones, Nana K. admits that she is attracted to Yasu. Intimidated by Reira, Nana O. decides to implement a smoking ban on the band when they're in the studio. Meanwhile, Nobu invites Ren to visit for a game of mahjong on June 7, 2001. Nana K. is excited to meet him, but upon returning, she is shocked to see Takumi, who Ren had also invited, welcome her home.
20	"Sudden Development! Hachi's Fate"; Transliteration: "Kyūtenkai! Hachi no Unmei" (Japanese: 急展開！ハチの運命)	Daisuke Chiba	Tomoko Konparu	August 23, 2006
As Ren and Takumi stay for dinner, Nana K. and the rest of Black Stones learn that Yasu went to the same junior high school as Takumi and that he had dated Reira for two years in high school. Disheartened, Nana K. feels inferior and believes Yasu would never date someone as plain as herself. While running errands with Nobu, Nana K. learns she has much in common with him and quickly feels better after talking to him. By the time they return, Takumi has left, and Nana O. warns Nana K. about Takumi's womanizing behavior. The next day, Nana K. is finally fired for continuous poor work performance. In her moment of despair, Takumi calls and invites her to spend time with him, to which she impulsively accepts.
21	"Suite Dreams"; Transliteration: "Suīto Rūmu no Yume" (Japanese: スイートルームの夢)	Shigetaka Ikeda	Tomoko Konparu	August 30, 2006
Although Nana K. recalls Nana O.'s warning and understands her relationship with Takumi is not serious, she longs for the feeling of being loved and allows Takumi to take her on a drive and to a hotel, where they dine and have sex. Ashamed, Nana K. is afraid of letting Nana O. know and lies that she is spending the night at Junko's place. Takumi promises Nana K. to return when Trapnest's concert tour ends, and he leaves his contact information for her the next morning. Meanwhile, Nana O. gets a cell phone from Ren, and Black Stones book another show at the nightclub.
21.5	"Junko's Room 2"; Transliteration: "Junko no heya (2)" (Japanese: 淳子の部屋（2）)	Ryōsuke Nakamura	Tomoko Konparu	September 6, 2006
Junko hosts a recap of episodes 12 to 21, where she and Kyosuke explain to Koichi Sato, the owner of Jackson Hole, why Nana K. has not coming, and they are later joined by Shoji. After Koichi Sato leaves, Nana K.'s former co-worker from the publishing company, Sakagami, arrives, where she reveals the segment features minor characters. This leaves Junko, Kyosuke, and Shoji to realize that they have been demoted to minor characters in the series.
22	"Wish of Tanabata, Hachi's Love"; Transliteration: "Tanabata no Negai, Hachi no Koi" (Japanese: 七夕の願い、ハチの恋)	Atsuko Ishizuka	Kazuyuki Fudeyasu	September 13, 2006
As Nana K. gets by with several part-time jobs, Trapnest is finishing their concert, and the male members of Black Stones are invited to their final show and after-party. Black Stones celebrate Tanabata, but Nana O. accidentally causes the tanzaku to fly out of the window. The next evening, Nana K. awaits Takumi's return and prepares dinner for Trapnest, only to become disappointed when Nana O. tells her they never promised to come. During the after-party, Takumi casually reveals that he and Nana K. had sex, angering Nobu and Shin. In the middle of the night, Takumi drops by room 707 to see Nana K., to which their relationship is secretly discovered by Nana O.
23	"I Want to Keep You All to Myself"; Transliteration: "Dare ni mo watashitakunai" (Japanese: 誰にも渡したくない)	Kanji Watanabe	Kazuyuki Fudeyasu	September 20, 2006
Shin helps Nobu come to terms about his feelings for Nana K. while warning him not to idealize her as innocent. Nana K. and Takumi learn more about each other and how compatible they are. Meanwhile, Nana O. leaves room 707 and calls Yasu, conflicted about supporting Nana K. and Takumi's relationship. Yasu has Ren pick Nana O. up and bring her to his house, as Nana O. finds it awkward to return. Ren suggests that Takumi's feelings for Nana K. are genuine, as he continues to return to see her. Nobu goes to Nana K. to confess his love, but he instead declares that he will defeat Takumi. Reira pays Shin ¥100,000 to spend the night with her and they begin a sexual relationship. Yasu receives a call from Gaia Records about Black Stones' demo tape.
24	"Hachi's Confused Heart"; Transliteration: "Midareru Hachi no kokoro" (Japanese: 乱れるハチの心)	Tōru Takahashi	Kazuyuki Fudeyasu	September 27, 2006
Yasu reveals that Black Stones has been scouted by Gaia Records, and a representative will be attending their next show. Nana O. reveals to Nana K. that she knows about her relationship with Takumi and clarifies that Nobu is in love with her. As Trapnest has a two-week break, Nana O. decides to spend that time with Ren, especially as she still finds it awkward to be around Nana K. At night, Nobu confirms to Nana K. that he is in love with her. Reira confides to Shin about her insecurities, and he leaves his lighter behind. When he returns for it, he turns down Reira's proposition to spend time together as she did not pay.
25	"A Capricious and Selfish Man"; Transliteration: "Kimagure de katte na otoko" (Japanese: 気まぐれで勝手な男)	Yū Kozakai	Kazuyuki Fudeyasu	October 1, 2006
While Nana O. goes to live at Ren's apartment for the next two weeks, Reira follows Takumi to their hometown, where they reflect on their childhoods. Meanwhile, Black Stones prepares for their next show, and Nana K. starts feeling attracted to Nobu. When he walks her home, she becomes worried that he sees her negatively because of her relationship with Takumi. Takumi unexpectedly arrives to pick Nana K., and after spending the evening with him, she becomes even more ashamed of facing Nana O. and Nobu, texting the former that she will stop coming to their studio sessions. As summer vacation begins, Misato arrives for Black Stones' next show.
26	"Hachi and Nana Missing Each Other"; Transliteration: "Surechigau Hachi to NANA" (Japanese: すれちがうハチとナナ)	Mayumi Ikeda	Tatsuhiko Urahata	October 10, 2006
Black Stones perform their next show at the nightclub with tickets sold out, causing Junko and Kyosuke to give up their seats for two fans. The members of Black Stones are invited out to dinner by Kawano, a Gaia Records representative who is interested in signing them. Meanwhile, Nana K., who has already prepared a celebratory dinner for them, begins to feel more distant towards Nana O. upon hearing the news. To sate her loneliness, she turns to Takumi. After noticing that Takumi plans to spend the night with Nana K., Reira calls Shin. Nana O. returns home early to see Nana K. but becomes apologetic upon missing her and hearing that she lied about not making dinner.
27	"Hachi's Desired Future"; Transliteration: "Hachi no hoshii mirai" (Japanese: ハチの欲しい未来)	Nanako Shimazaki	Tatsuhiko Urahata	October 18, 2006
The next morning, Nana O. brings the food Nana K. made to Nobu and encourages him to make up with her. Reira attempts to pay Shin for spending the night with her, but he refuses the payment. When Nana K. returns from her job, the male members of Black Stones and Misato reveal they are celebrating, as they are offered a contract with Gaia Records. Nana K. and Nobu are sent out to buy more wine, and she apologizes for avoiding him and not being able to meet his expectations, but Nobu promises to accept her for who she is. Shin asks Yasu about Reira and learns that the reason why they broke up was because he could never help her get over Takumi, with whom she is in love.
28	"Hachi and Nobu's Sudden Intimacy"; Transliteration: "Hachi to Nobu, kyūsekkin" (Japanese: ハチとノブ、急接近)	Atsuko Ishizuka	Tatsuhiko Urahata	October 25, 2006
Yasu reveals to Shin that he knows about his personal history, as well as the fact that Misato is using a fake name, and he agrees to visit Shin's stepfather in his place to get his permission to sign Black Stones' contract, as Shin is a minor. Nobu invites Nana K. to see the summer fireworks together, and the two agree that they will progress their relationship once she has broken up with Takumi. When Takumi calls Nana K., she is unsure on how to tell him, but when his flippant attitude suddenly angers her, she demands he never call her again and hangs up. After notifying Nobu, the two begin dating and spending the night together.
29	"The Problem with Showing Love"; Transliteration: "Aijō hyōgen no mondai" (Japanese: 愛情表現の問題)	Kanji Wakabayashi	Tatsuhiko Urahata	November 1, 2006
Nana K. explores her newfound feelings for Nobu, as Nobu reveals how he and Nana O. became friends. When Nana O. reveals she is aware about their relationship, Nana K. admits that she's in love with him. Nana K. and Nobu visit Junko and Kyosuke's art exhibition together, causing the latter two, as well as Shoji, to become curious as to how their relationship started and how Nana K. has changed since breaking up with Shoji. Takumi is confused as to why Nana K. is blocking his calls, unaware that she had broken up with him. Nobu is unnerved when Nana O. admits she used him to keep Nana K. close to her. Yasu and Kawano meet with Shin's stepfather, who considers him a stranger and agrees to sign the contract as long as Shin's real identity and connection to their family are kept secret.
30	"The Breakdown of NANA's Heart"; Transliteration: "Kekkai girigiri, NANA no kokoro" (Japanese: 決壊ギリギリ、ナナの心)	Tomomi Yoshino	Tomoko Konparu	November 8, 2006
The fireworks display is canceled due to the typhoon, but the members of Black Stones, Nana K., and Misato play with sparklers outside. Nana O. reflects on the day she moved to Tokyo and met Nana K. When she spends the night at Ren's apartment, she discovers how possessive she can be about the people she loves. The next morning, Ren discovers that he is followed by the paparazzi, and Takumi warns him about being caught with Nana O. Meanwhile, Nana K. feels ill at her job and is sent home, but on her way back, she buys a pregnancy test, the results of which are revealed to be positive.
31	"Hachiko is Pregnant"; Transliteration: "Hachiko, ninshin" (Japanese: ハチ子、妊娠)	Atsuko Ishizuka	Tomoko Konparu	November 15, 2006
Nana K. confirms her pregnancy after a visit to the doctor, who advises her to make a decision on whether she wants to keep the baby. This worries her, especially after hearing about Shin and Nana O. being abandoned by their parents. As summer vacation ends and Misato travels back home, Shin overhears two staff members at Gaia Records discussing against having Black Stones debut. When Takumi makes a surprise visit to Nana K., he figures out that she is pregnant. Upon learning she is dating Nobu, he notifies him through her cell phone, while also declaring that he will raise the baby as his child.
32	"Don't Ever Let Go of This Hand You Hold"; Transliteration: "Tsunaida Te o Hanasanaide" (Japanese: 繋いだ手を離さないで)	Atsuko Ishizuka	Tomoko Konparu	November 20, 2006
After learning that Nana K. is pregnant, Nana O. is frustrated at the possibility the child is Takumi's and urges Nobu to father the child; however, Nobu accuses Nana O. of using him to keep Nana K. with her, causing her to run away in fear. While Takumi is away, Nobu asks Nana K. if the child is his own, to which Nana K. does not respond. Meanwhile, Reira faces a slump in writing lyrics for Trapnest's new song, but she succeeds with encouragement from Shin while also telling him about the red string of fate.
33	"Hachi's Choice"; Transliteration: "Hachi no Sentaku" (Japanese: ハチの選択)	Nanako Shimazaki	Tomoko Konparu	November 29, 2006
Nana O. turns to Yasu for help, while Nana K. runs off to ask advice from Junko and Kyosuke. Yasu calms Nana O. down, while Nana K. realizes that even though she loves Nobu, he is unable to financially provide for the baby and would have to risk giving up his music career. When Nana K. returns to room 707, Takumi comforts and takes care of her for the rest of the night. By morning, Nana K. tells him she will keep the baby and raise it as his, and Takumi suggests they get married.
34	"The Broken Strawberry Glass"; Transliteration: "Wareta Ichigo no Gurasu" (Japanese: 割れたいちごのグラス)	Yū Kozakai	Kazuyuki Fudeyasu	December 6, 2006
Nana O. returns home to find Takumi and Nana K., who announce that they are marrying and that Nana K. will be moving out due to it. When Takumi and Nana K. retreat to the latter's room, he urges her to have sex much to her reluctance. Meanwhile, Nana O. accidentally causes one of their strawberry glass cups to fall, which causes her to go into shock and break the other glass. Later, when Trapnest begins recording their new single, Takumi informs their manager that he will be marrying. Reira has an emotional breakdown upon hearing the news and asks Shin for Yasu's phone number. At the end of the day, Nana O. wakes up in Ren's bed with no memory of what had happened earlier.
35	"Reira's Loneliness"; Transliteration: "Reira no Kodoku" (Japanese: レイラの孤独)	Tomomi Yoshino	Kazuyuki Fudeyasu	December 13, 2006
While Trapnest is forced to delay their recording session to look for Reira, Ren confronts Takumi about Reira's feelings towards him and how she may no longer want to sing once Takumi is married, despite Takumi insisting he will never be romantically interested in her. Reira seeks Yasu for comfort, but he turns her away and has her manager pick her up. Fearing that her self-worth is tied to singing, Reira forces herself to continue recording Trapnest's new single. While Nobu and Nana O. discuss Nana O.'s earlier mental state, Nana O. tries to cheer Nobu up after telling him about Takumi and Nana K.'s engagement.
36	"Blast's New Song!!"; Transliteration: "Burasuto Shinkyoku!!" (Japanese: ブラスト新曲!!)	Tōru Takahashi	Kazuyuki Fudeyasu	December 20, 2006
Kurata investigates Nana O.'s past and is reluctantly assigned to find more information. Determined to win Nana K. back from Trapnest, Black Stones perform a new song to their management, and while it is well-received, they later learn that Gaia Records is reluctant to debut them due to the poor economy. This leads to an argument between Nana O. and Shin, causing Nana O. to declare she will stop relying on others. Nobu informs Ren that Nana O.'s mental state has gotten worse, while Ren finds out that Nana O. had thrown her cell phone into the sink. Afterwards, Nana O. heads home to the apartment for the first time in nine days, only to find that Nana K. has left a letter for her and moved out.
36.5	"Junko's Room 3"; Transliteration: "Junko no Heya (3)" (Japanese: 淳子の部屋（3）)	Ryōsuke Nakamura	Tomoko Konparu	January 10, 2007
Junko, Kyosuke, Shoji, and Naoki provide a recap of episodes 22 through 36 while pointing out that Naoki has no connections with any of the main characters.
37	"Hachi the High-Class Housewife"; Transliteration: "Hachi, Shiroganēze" (Japanese: ハチ、シロガネーゼ)	Masahiko Watanabe	Kazuyuki Fudeyasu	January 17, 2007
As Nana K. adjusts to her new life living in a penthouse suite in Shirokane, Junko, Kyosuke, and Shoji begin to suspect that she is married to Takumi. Meanwhile, Naoki visits and meets Nana K. for the first time. At night, Takumi tells her that their relationship no longer needs to be kept a secret after getting it cleared by his agency and plans meeting her family before they get married. Nana K. reconnects with Shin when he calls her, but she is forced to hang up when Takumi appears. Recognizing Takumi and Nana K.'s relationship, Shin realizes Reira has no one to rely on due to Yasu being busy, so he visits her to sing "Layla" for her with his guitar. Ren goes to find Nana O. at Nobu's request and suggests that Nana K.'s letter showed how much she loved her.
38	"The Trigger of Fate"; Transliteration: "Unmei no Hikigane" (Japanese: 運命の引き金)	Mayumi Ikeda	Kazuyuki Fudeyasu	January 24, 2007
The next morning, Reira finds that Shin has left behind his lighter again. Ren suggests to Nana O. to visit Nana K. in her new home, and in a moment of carelessness, they are photographed by Kurata on their way out of the apartment. Nana O. buys new strawberry glass cups as a gift to Nana K. and attempts to visit her, but she is denied entry. Meanwhile, Nana K. meets with Shin for lunch and gets his opinion on raising a child. The next morning, Black Stones is all over the news when Nana O. and Ren's relationship is leaked to the public.
39	"Just You Watch, Hachiko!"; Transliteration: "Hachikō, mitero yo!" (Japanese: ハチ公、見てろよ！)	Tomomi Yoshino; Atsuko Ishizuka	Kazuyuki Fudeyasu	January 31, 2007
Nobu and Shin are forced to flee due to media attention, while suspecting Gaia Records are involved and using Nana O. and Ren's relationship to promote their band. Trapnest is suddenly sent abroad to London for a photo shoot for their new single to avoid the press. Nana K. gets into an argument with Takumi when the latter discourages her from seeing Nana O., but Junko and Kyosuke clarify that Nana K. getting involved may direct unwanted media attention towards herself due to being both Nana O.'s roommate and Takumi's fiancée. While Yasu picks up Nana O., Nana O. delivers a message aimed at Nana K. through the media, declaring that Black Stones will become famous.
40	"Blast Debuts!"; Transliteration: "Burasuto, Debyū!" (Japanese: ブラスト、デビュー！)	Atsuko Ishizuka	Kazuyuki Fudeyasu	February 7, 2007
The members of Black Stones are forced to stay in a hotel until the media attention dies down. Yasu announces that, after negotiating with Gaia Records, they will be releasing their debut single. While Nana O. has put her pride aside and is willing to take advantage of the attention, Nobu feels uneasy with how Gaia Records is using the scandal to set up their debut. While Trapnest goes to London, Nana K. decides to return her hometown, but she makes Takumi promise to buy her an engagement ring. At night, Nana O. tells Nobu of her plan to get Nana K. back through the success of Black Stones. As the members of Black Stones officially sign the contract, meanwhile, Reira discovers that Black Stones will be releasing their debut single on October 31, 2001, the same day as Trapnest's new single.
41	"Blast's Training Camp"; Transliteration: "Burasuto Gasshuku" (Japanese: ブラスト合宿)	Yū Kozakai	Kazuyuki Fudeyasu	February 14, 2007
Takumi returns early to Japan to meet Nana K.'s family, bringing her an engagement ring as well as gifts for their baby. As Black Stones is sent to a training camp in the forest, Gaia Records announce that they will be promoting their single by having guerrilla gigs in random cities across Japan. In London, Reira receives an e-mail from Shin, and during Trapnest's photo shoot, she and Ren learn from Mari, Reira's manager, that Yasu has quit his law apprenticeship in order to continue his activities with Black Stones. At night, Yasu admits to Nana O. that he is in love with her. Both Nana O. and Ren start realizing that they are becoming distant with one another while Nana O. starts feeling closer to Yasu.
42	"Nana O.'s Sudden Fit"; Transliteration: "Nana, Totsuzen no Hossa" (Japanese: ナナ、突然の発作)	Nanako Shimazaki	Tomoko Konparu	February 21, 2007
Reira replies to Shin's e-mail, while Nobu texts Nana K. asking to talk but receives no reply. Reira later wakes up in the night to find out that Ren has passed out in the bathtub from doing drugs. Meanwhile, Black Stones' training camp ends after they finish recording their single and are sent to live in the agency's dormitory during promotions. Nobu meets Yuri Kousaka, an AV idol under the same agency, and, worried about their closeness, Nana O. reminds Nobu of their plan to get Nana K. back. However, Nobu states that he has given up on Nana K., causing Nana O. to hyperventilate.
43	"Blast's Guerrilla Live"; Transliteration: "Burasuto, Gerira Raibu" (Japanese: ブラスト、ゲリラライブ)	Masahiko Watanabe	Tomoko Konparu	February 28, 2007
Miu Shinoda, an actress living in the same dormitory, gives Nobu advice on how to help Nana O. with hyperventilation. Nana O. is given a recommendation to see a psychiatrist, but she ignores it as she becomes engrossed with Black Stones' activities. The band holds their first guerrilla gig on October 1, 2001 in Shinjuku, with Nana K. stumbling upon it by chance. Afterwards, Nana O. sees that Nobu and Miu have gotten closer and nearly hyperventilates again after remembering he has given up on Nana K. However, she realizes that Yasu is able to calm her down and considers breaking up with Ren to be with him. Meanwhile, Takumi notices that Reira is wearing Shin's lighter.
44	"Blast VS T-Nest"; Transliteration: "Burasuto VS Toranesu" (Japanese: ブラストVSトラネス)	Tomomasa Yamazaki	Tomoko Konparu	March 7, 2007
Black Stones and Trapnest are making an appearance on a music television program, and Yasu confronts Ren over his drug use and treatment of Nana O. After rehearsals, Shin and Reira sneak out to have sex while learning that their birthdays are coming up in the same week. Nobu visits Miu at her drama's filming location, but she rejects him due to their age difference, as she is 27 years old. Nana O. finds Ren in her dressing room, where he proposes to her. After vowing to die for each other, the two have sex where Ren chokes Nana O. When the show's recording begins, Nana O. meets Reira but also becomes suspicious of her relationship with Takumi.
45	"Blast's First TV Performance"; Transliteration: "Burasuto TV Hatsu Shutsuen" (Japanese: ブラストTV初出演)	Atsuko Ishizuka	Tomoko Konparu	March 14, 2007
After the show is broadcast live, Nana O. confronts Ren about Takumi and Reira's relationship. Nana O. accepts Ren's marriage proposal, but she cannot bring herself to notify her agency while Ren tells Takumi. After watching the show, Nana K. confesses to Junko that she received a text message from Nobu and that she feels obligated to give him an explanation for their break-up, based on how she felt when Shoji never explained why he cheated on her. Junko decides she can no longer give Nana K. advice as she lacks the contextual understanding. While the members of Black Stones play mahjong with Miu and Yuri, Shin receives a text message from Nana K. inviting them to watch the fireworks display.
46	"Reunion! Hachi and Shoji"; Transliteration: "Saikai! Hachi to Shōji" (Japanese: 再会！ハチと章司)	Tomomi Yoshino	Tomoko Konparu	March 21, 2007
Black Stones begin postponing their activities to prepare to meet with Nana K., in hopes of Nobu and Nana K. getting back together again. On her way to meet them, Nana K. sees Shoji at Jackson Hole for the first time since their break-up. The two realize they enjoyed being together but now have to move on. Meanwhile, Takumi and the CEO of Trapnest's record label, Mitsuru Narita, plan on having Ren announce his marriage to Nana O., albeit, to Reira's discovery, in hopes of calming the recent media attention and getting Ren to break his drug addiction. When Reira points out that having two members of Trapnest immediately marry will hurt their reputation, Takumi decides to postpone his and Nana K.'s marriage. Black Stones arrive at room 707 in disguise as they wait for Nana K.
47	"Fireworks Display, Hachi and Nana"; Transliteration: "Hanabi Taikai, Hachi to Nana" (Japanese: 花火大会、ハチとナナ)	Morio Asaka	Tomoko Konparu	March 28, 2007
Years in the future, the members of Black Stones, Nana K., and her daughter, Satsuki, meet in room 707 to watch the fireworks. However, Nana O. is revealed to have lost contact with them. In the past, Nana K. suddenly felt regretful about Shoji and lost the confidence to see Nobu as the fireworks begin. When Nana O. calls her, she lies that Nobu will not be coming. Nana K. later arrives at room 707 while everyone else has left to watch the fireworks, unaware that Nobu has stayed behind. Back in the future, everyone watches the fireworks begin, while Nana K. hopes that Nana O. will return.
