= Taste My Beat =

EP by Anna Tsuchiya
- Released: August 24, 2005
- Recorded: ??
- Genre: Rock
- Length: 20:38
- Label: Mad Prey Records

Taste My Beat, Anna Tsuchiya's first solo release as a mini album, was released after the disbanding of her former band Spin Aqua. Although there were no singles made from this mini-album, Taste My Skin was used as a radio single for promotion, included with a PV to air on television. Several western rock musicians assisted Anna with her album who include:

- Josh Freese from A Perfect Circle on Drums
- Justin Meldal-Johnsen, a backup from Beck, on Bass
- Michael Ward, guitarist from Avril Lavigne, on Guitar

Taste My Beat reached #27 on Oricon charts, and stayed on the charts for six weeks and sold more than 8,000 units.

== Track listing ==
No.	Title	Lyrics	Music	Arranger(s)	Length
1.	"Ah Ah"	ANNA (Anna Tsuchiya)	Paul Rein, Winston Sela, Daniel Eklund	LOW IQ 01	3:17
2.	"Taste My Skin"	ANNA	Niklas Ellerstad, Martin Fredriksson, Aleena	CHOKUbich	3:10
3.	"In my hands"	Rie Eto	Johan Boback, joachim Nillson, Sarah Godden	Gary Newby	3:48
4.	"Frozen Rose"	ANNA	Fredrik Bjrk, Samuel Laxberg, Julia Eriksson	CHOKUbich	4:04
5.	"My Lullaby"	ANNA	Gary Newby	Gary Newby	2:54
6.	"Somebody Help Me"	William Brandt, Keith Volpone, Walter Brandt	William Brandt, Keith Volpone, Walter Brandt	Gary Newby	3:25

== Additional Disk Contents ==
- An off-shot movie
- A screen saver
- A computer wallpaper

== Notes ==
- The song In my hands was used as background music in a Venus Jean television commercial.
- The song Somebody Help Me is featured as the ending theme of the Japanese version of the television program Tru Calling.
