= Cocoon (Anna Tsuchiya song) =

Single by Anna Tsuchiya

from the album Nudy Show!
- Released: January 30, 2008
- Recorded: 2007
- Genre: Pop rock, pop, rock
- Label: Avex Trax
- Songwriters: ANNA (Anna Tsuchiya), Ayumi Miyazaki, Andreas Ahlenius, Fredrik Strom, Daniel Gibson, Anders Bergstrom

Anna Tsuchiya singles chronology
"Bubble Trip / Sweet Sweet Song" (2007)	"Cocoon" (2008)	"Crazy World" (2008)

"Cocoon" is the seventh single of singer Anna Tsuchiya. The single was released by Mad Pray Records on 30 January 2008 in two versions; as a regular CD and a limited edition CD+DVD version. The song spent four weeks in the Oricon charts, reaching #19 on 11 February 2008. "cocoon" was used in a NTT DoCoMo television commercial, while the B-side "U" was used as the campaign song for the DVD release of The L Word in Japan. The third track, "Guys", was not included in the limited-edition version.

== Track listing ==
CD
No.	Title	Lyrics	Music	Arranger(s)	Length
1.	"Cocoon"	ANNA (Anna Tsuchiya), Ayumi Miyazaki	Andreas Ahlenius, Fredrik Strom, Daniel Gibson, Anders Bergstrom	Gary Newby	3:46
2.	"U"	ANNA	Joey Carbone, Anthony Mazza	Joey Carbone, Anthony Mazza	3:08
3.	"Guys"	ANNA, Rie Eto	Ayumi Miyazaki	Ayumi Miyazaki	4:14

DVD
No.	Title	Length
1.	"Cocoon" (Music video)
