= Every Beat of My Heart =

Every Beat of My Heart may refer to:

- "Every Beat of My Heart" (Gladys Knight & the Pips song), 1961
- Every Beat of My Heart (Rod Stewart album), 1986
- Every Beat of My Heart (Sharissa album), 2005
- "Every Beat of My Broken Heart", a song by Hawk Nelson from Made, 2013

== See also ==
- "Every Beat of the Heart", a 1990 song by the Railway Children
- "Beat of My Heart", a 2005 song by Hilary Duff
