= Strip Me? =

Studio album by Anna Tsuchiya
- Released: August 2, 2006
- Genre: Rock
- Label: Mad Prey Records

Anna Tsuchiya chronology
Taste My xxxremixxxxxxx!!!!!!!! Beat Life! (2006)	Strip Me? (2006)	Anna Tsuchiya Inspi' Nana (Black Stones) (2007)

Strip Me? is the debut studio album by Japanese recording artist Anna Tsuchiya. A CD+DVD version of the album was released that included all of Tsuchiya's music videos released prior to the album, as well as the documentary SING or DIE.

== Single releases and uses ==
The songs "Rose" and "Zero" were used as the first opening theme and background music for the 2006 anime Nana, respectively. The two would later be compiled into a best-of album in March 2007, entitled Nana Best. "Lovin' You" was used as the theme song to the Japanese dub of the film Silent Hill. "Grooving Beating" was featured in a commercial for Whiteen, and "knock down" was used in the Kosé Cosmetics Visée commercial. "True Colors" is a cover of the Cyndi Lauper song.

== Track listing ==
CD
No.	Title	Lyrics	Music	Arranger(s)	Length
1.	"Zero" (Artist: ANNA inspi’ NANA(BLACK STONES))	ANNA	Katsumi Ohnishi	Katsumi Ohnishi	3:47
2.	"Rose" (Artist: ANNA inspi’ NANA(BLACK STONES))	ANNA	Ayumi Miyazaki	Ayumi Miyazaki	3:47
3.	"No Way"	ANNA	COZZi	COZZi	4:22
4.	"Lovin' You"	ANNA	Joey Carbone, Anthony Mazza, Ron Harris	Gary Newby	3:56
5.	"Under My Mask"	ANNA	Jan Lindvaag, Thomas Heyerdahl, Rune Helmersen	LOW IQ 01	3:05
6.	"True Colors" (Cyndi Lauper's song)	Tom Kelly, Billy Steinberg	Tom Kelly, Billy Steinberg	Acidman	3:32
7.	"Give Me Kiss & Kiss"	ANNA	Peter Mansson, Jan Kask		3:53
8.	"Forever"	ANNA	AYA	Gary Newby	4:28
9.	"Interlude" (Performance: Anna Tsuchiya)		Gary Newby
10.	"Change Your Life"	ANNA	Suzanne Standfast, Patrick standfast, Joa Heimer	Gary Newby	3:44
11.	"Ecstasy"	Rie Eto	Nao Tanaka		3:29
12.	"Jane"	Rie Eto	Joey Carbone, L.LIN-HSIA-HUANG	Joey Carbone, L.LIN-HSIA-HUANG	3:27
13.	"Grooving Beating"	ANNA, Rie Eto	Yohei Nanba	Kanou Kawashima	3:42
14.	"Knock Down"	ANNA	Ayumi Miyazaki	Ayumi Miyazaki	4:37
15.	"Slap That Naughty Body"	ANNA	Christina Groth, Chief One, Remee		3:30

DVD
No.	Title	Length
1.	"Taste My Skin" (Music video)
2.	"Change Your Life" (Music video)
3.	"Slap That Naughty Body" (Music video)
4.	"rose ~strip me? edition~"
5.	"Special Contents: Sing or Die"
