= Wonder Woman (Namie Amuro song) =

Promotional single by Namie Amuro featuring Ai and Anna Tsuchiya

from the album Checkmate!
- Language: Japanese, English
- Released: March 9, 2011
- Recorded: Azabu-O Studio, Avex Studio
- Length: 4:53
- Label: Avex Trax
- Songwriters: Tiger, Marek Pompetzki, Paul NZA, Chantal Kreviazuk, Tanya Lacey
- Producers: Marek Pompetzki, Paul NZA

"Wonder Woman" is a song by Japanese recording artist Namie Amuro, featuring R&B singer and rapper Ai as well as rock musician Anna Tsuchiya. The song was the lead promotional single for Amuro's collaboration-compilation album, Checkmate!, released in April 2011.

Namie Amuro had previously collaborated with Ai on the songs "Uh Uh,,,,,," (Suite Chic, 2003), ""Do What U Gotta Do" feat. Ai, Namie Amuro & Mummy-D (Zeebra, 2006) and Ai 2010 single "Fake." Ai and Tsuchiya had previously collaborated on Ai's 2007 album Don't Stop Ai with "Butterfly" featuring Anna Tsuchiya, Anty the Kunoichi, Pushim, as well as on Tsuchiya's 2008 single "Crazy World". Amuro and Tsuchiya have not previously collaborated.

The song was the most successful of the four new songs from the album, peaking at number five on the Recording Industry Association of Japan's Digital Track Chart, and being certified gold twice, for downloads to cellphones as well as PC downloads.

== Composition and production ==
The song is an up-beat pop rock song, sung in a vocal trio with verses sung alternatively by each singer and the chorus sung by all three. The verses are arranged sparsely, with a bass guitar and beats, while the chorus features a full band backing with drums, bass guitar, and guitar.

The lyrics are split roughly half and half between English and Japanese, with the singers alternating between the two languages throughout the song. The lyrics describe somebody trying to reassure someone that they will be their "wonder woman" who will be there to help them in times of need. The person is someone who is always acting strong, and the song's protagonist wants them to "tell [her] those SOS [moments]" so that they can help them.

Amuro wanted to create a collaboration featuring a chorus of strong female vocalists. When thinking of such musicians, Ai and Anna Tsuchiya came to mind. Amuro felt that she had worked with Ai so many times in the past that a collaboration with her could not go wrong.

== Promotion ==
Namie Amuro in the Coca-Cola Zero Wild Race commercial, featuring "Wonder Woman."

The song was featured in a high-profile marketing campaign for Coca-Cola Zero, the third of Amuro's songs to be used, after "Wild" (2009) and "Break It" (2010). The commercial first aired on February 13, 2011. The commercial featured Amuro on a motorbike in the desert, racing several androids on bikes.

All three musicians billed in the song appeared on the cover of fashion magazine S Cawaii's April issue, in promotion of the single.

On June 25, 2011, all three musicians attended the 2011 MTV Video Music Aid Japan award ceremony and performed the song.

== Music video ==
(left to right) Ai, Namie Amuro and Anna Tsuchiya in the outfits they appear in the music video

The music video was directed by Hideaki Sunaga, who had previously not worked with Amuro, Tsuchiya or Ai on a music video. The video features the three vocalists in a darkly lit, wet parking lot. One musician performs the song while walking across a road, another in a white car, and another in a red elevator. Each vocalist switches roles, appearing in each of these separately. After one cycle of this, two vocalists are seen entering separate elevators, and the cycle repeats. Only in the final scene of the video do all three vocalists appear together in the red elevator.

The music video first aired on Space Shower, on February 18. The video is featured as a part of Checkmate!'s DVD edition.

== Charts ==
Chart	Peak position
Billboard Adult Contemporary Airplay	2
Billboard Japan Hot 100	5
RIAJ Digital Track Chart weekly top 100	5

== Certification ==
Chart	Amount
RIAJ full-length cellphone downloads	Gold (100,000+)
RIAJ PC downloads	Gold (100,000+)

== Personnel ==
"Wonder Woman"
A sample of the chorus of "Wonder Woman."

Personnel details were sourced from Checkmate!'s liner notes booklet.

- Ai – vocals
- D.O.I. – mixing (at Daimonion Recordings)
- Hitomi Joko – recording
- Shigeki Kashii – recording
- Ryosuke Kataoka – recording
- Chantal Kreviazuk – writing
- Tanya Lacey – writing
- Paul NZA – instruments, production, recording, writing
- Marek Pompetzki – instruments, production, recording, writing
- Tiger – writing, vocal direction for Ai, Namie Amuro
- Anna Tsuchiya – vocals
- Yuko Yasumoto – production coordination

== Release history ==
Region	Date	Format
Japan	February 16, 2011	Ringtone
Japan	February 17, 2011	Radio add date
Japan	March 9, 2011	Cellphone download
Japan	April 27, 2011	PC download
