= Ayumi Miyazaki =

- 宮崎 歩
- Born: August 25, 1971 (age 54)
- Other name: Ayumi (アユミ)
- Occupations: Singer; songwriter
- Musical career
- Genres: J-pop; anime song
- Labels: Interchannel; Feel Mee

Ayumi Miyazaki (宮崎 歩, Miyazaki Ayumi; born August 25, 1971), also credited as Ayumi (アユミ), is a Japanese singer and songwriter. Miyazaki has sung several songs in the Digimon series. He sang the evolution theme song for Digimon Adventure called "Brave Heart" and its Digimon Adventure Tri and Digimon Adventure: Last Evolution Kizuna remixes. He also sang the two evolution theme songs for Digimon Adventure 02, called "Break Up" and "Beat Hit!" In addition, he sang the second evolution theme for Digimon Frontier, called "The Last Element". Moreover, he collaborated with other Digimon song artists in Yūki o Uketsugu Kodomotachi e (勇気を受け継ぐ子供達へ; lit. "To the Children Who Inherit Courage") and "WE ARE Xros Heart! ver. X7". He also sang the theme song for Mushrambo, called "Power Play".

He composed the music for Rose, Anna Tsuchiya's highest ranking song, which was used as the opening theme to the anime adaption of the manga NANA. He also played the guitar on the original recording.

His father is Naoshi Miyazaki (宮崎 尚志) and his older brother is Michi Miyazaki (宮崎 道), who are both composers. He was a guest at Expo Anime Brasil 2006 in São Paulo. He is also the uncle of actor Jun Shison.

== Digimon singles ==
- Brave Heart
1. "Brave Heart" (June 25, 1999)
2. "Shinka de Guts~"
3. "Brave Heart (Original Karaoke)"
4. "Shinka de Guts" (Original Karaoke)
- Break Up! (May 10, 2000)
1. "Break Up!"
2. "Zettai All Right ~Digimental Up!~" (Armor Shinkers)
3. "Break Up! (Original Karaoke)"
4. "Zettai All Right~Digimental Up!~" (Original Karaoke)
- Beat Hit! (February 11, 2001)
1. "Beat Hit!"
2. "Forever Friends" (Hassy)
3. "Beat Hit!" (Original Karaoke)
4. "Forever Friends" (Original Karaoke)
- The Last Element (February 5, 2003)
1. "The Last Element"
2. "Miracle Maker" (Spirit of Adventure)
3. "The Last Element" (Original Karaoke)
4. "Miracle Maker" (Original Karaoke)
