= Native Place =

Studio album by the Railway Children
- Released: 1990
- Studio: Townhouse, Battery (London)
- Label: Virgin
- Producer: Steve Lovell, Steve Power

The Railway Children chronology
Recurrence (1988)	Native Place (1990)	Radio One Evening Sessions (1993)

Native Place is an album by the English band the Railway Children, released in 1990. The band broke up after the album's release, in part due to EMI's acquisition of Virgin Records.

The album peaked at No. 59 on the UK Albums Chart. "Every Beat of the Heart" peaked at No. 1 on Billboard's Modern Rock Tracks chart. The band promoted the album by touring with the Heart Throbs.

== Production ==
The album was produced by Steve Lovell and Steve Power. It was recorded over a period of four months, to the annoyance of chief songwriter Gary Newby.

== Critical reception ==
Professional ratings
Review scores
Source	Rating
AllMusic	3.5/5 stars
The Encyclopedia of Popular Music	3/5 stars
Select	2/5 stars

Trouser Press wrote: "No longer an unassuming pop group, the Railway Children are growing into dance-oriented chart hacks." The Washington Post opined that "Native Place is not brave or powerful or important, but it's seriously listenable."

The Daily Breeze determined that the album "leans more toward guitar-oriented pop, boasting strong melodies, airy textures and a sunny optimism." The Dayton Daily News stated that "the group's sound recalls the jangling guitars of the Byrds combined with a sweeping keyboard sound from the early '80s."

AllMusic wrote that "the slick production and sunny synths couldn't leech the buoyancy and emotional impact from the poetic, romantic songwriting and warm harmonies of Gary Newby." MusicHound Rock: The Essential Album Guide deemed Native Place "one of the definitive pop albums of the early '90s ... Newby's gentle vocals are flawless."

== Track listing ==
All tracks are written by Gary Newby.

No.	Title	Length
1.	"Every Beat of the Heart"	4:08
2.	"Music Stop"	4:00
3.	"You're Young"	4:32
4.	"Because"	4:45
5.	"Cotton Counting"	1:59
6.	"It's Heaven"	3:34
7.	"Something So Good"	4:14
8.	"Collide"	4:16
9.	"Native Place"	3:53
10.	"Fall On"	1:27
11.	"Harbour Force"	3:58
12.	"Blue Sky"	4:06

== Personnel ==
The Railway Children

- Gary Newby – vocals, lead guitar, keyboards, artwork, sleeve design
- Brian Bateman – rhythm guitar
- Stephen Hull – bass
- Guy Keegan – drums, percussion

with:

- Matt Irving – additional keyboards, accordion
- Matthew Taylor – saxophone on "Because"
