= Kamen Rider Fourze =

Television series

- Genre: Tokusatsu; Superhero fiction Science fiction School drama Comedy
- Created by: Shotaro Ishinomori
- Written by: Kazuki Nakashima
- Directed by: Koichi Sakamoto
- Starring: Sota Fukushi; Ryo Yoshizawa; Ryuki Takahashi; Fumika Shimizu; Rikako Sakata; Justin Tomimori; Shiho; Shion Tsuchiya; Takushi Tanaka; Shingo Tsurumi; Kousei Amano
- Voices of: Eiji Takemoto; Rie Tanaka; Nobuyuki Hiyama
- Narrated by: Nobuyuki Hiyama
- Opening theme: "Switch On!" by Anna Tsuchiya
- Composer: Shuhei Naruse
- Country of origin: Japan
- Original language: Japanese
- No. of episodes: 48 (list of episodes)

Production
- Producers: Kengo Motoi (TV Asahi); Hideaki Tsukada (Toei); Kazuhiro Takahashi (Toei)
- Running time: 20–25 minutes
- Production companies: Toei Company; Ishimori Productions; TV Asahi Corporation; Asatsu-DK

Original release
- Network: ANN (TV Asahi)
- Release: September 4, 2011 – August 26, 2012

Related
- Kamen Rider OOO; Kamen Rider Wizard

Kamen Rider Fourze (仮面ライダーフォーゼ, Kamen Raidā Fōze) is a Japanese tokusatsu drama in Toei Company's Kamen Rider Series, being the 13th series in the Heisei period run and the 22nd overall. It began airing on September 4, 2011, the week following the conclusion of Kamen Rider OOO, joining Kaizoku Sentai Gokaiger and then Tokumei Sentai Go-Busters in the Super Hero Time lineup.

The series commemorates not only the Kamen Rider Series' 40th anniversary but also the 50th anniversary of spaceflight, which began with Yuri Gagarin's flight in 1961. The show's catchphrase is "Switch on youth 'cause we're going into space!" (青春スイッチオンで宇宙キター！, Seishun suitchi on de uchū kitā!), referencing the Fourze Driver transformation belt which gets its various powers from devices called Astroswitches to conjure attachments to Fourze's limbs.

== Production ==
The Kamen Rider Fourze trademark was registered by Toei on April 18, 2011.

Fourze was written by Kazuki Nakashima, known for his screenplays of Oh! Edo Rocket and Gurren Lagann. The creature designer was Kia Asamiya, known for his artwork for the manga Martian Successor Nadesico and Silent Möbius. Koichi Sakamoto, known for his work on the American Power Rangers franchise, served as the series' main director after his work on the Kamen Rider W films and several episodes of Kaizoku Sentai Gokaiger.

== Story ==
Amanogawa High School (AGHS) has become the center of strange happenings, and things only get stranger when the bad boy-styled transfer student Gentaro Kisaragi attempts to make friends in his way, reuniting with childhood friend and self-professed space travel otaku Yuki Jojima, all while gaining the ire of loner Kengo Utahoshi. When the campus becomes overrun with monstrous constructs called Zodiarts, Kengo, and Yuki attempt to use the strange devices they have found in the Rabbit Hatch lunar base that they access through a locker in an off-limits part of campus to fight them. However, Gentaro interferes in their plans, in part due to Kengo's body being unable to handle the strains of battle, and uses the devices to transform into Fourze. Upon learning of other heroes called Kamen Riders, Gentaro creates the Kamen Rider Club whose membership includes Yuki, Kengo, the school's queen bee Miu Kazashiro, Miu's jock boyfriend Shun Daimonji, garishly styled social butterfly JK and goth girl Tomoko Nozama. Later joined by Ryusei Sakuta, another transfer student who transforms into Kamen Rider Meteor, and their teacher Mr. Chuta Ohsugi, the Kamen Rider Club and Kamen Rider Fourze learn of the Horoscopes, an evolved group of Zodiarts who have been orchestrating events on the school grounds to build up their ranks. As the battle escalates, the Horoscopes set their motions to the final phase of their master plan before Kengo discovers his true existence.

== Episodes ==
The titles of episodes of Kamen Rider Fourze consist of four kanji that can be read together to form a full statement.

No.	Title	Directed by	Written by	Original release date
1	"Youth-Ful Trans-Formation"; Transliteration: "Sei Shun Hen Shin" (Japanese: 青・春・変・身)	Koichi Sakamoto	Kazuki Nakashima	September 4, 2011
2	"Space Is Amaz-Ing"; Transliteration: "U Chū Jō Tō" (Japanese: 宇・宙・上・等)	Koichi Sakamoto	Kazuki Nakashima	September 11, 2011
3	"Queen E-Lec-Tion"; Transliteration: "Jo Ō Sen Kyo" (Japanese: 女・王・選・挙)	Koichi Sakamoto	Kazuki Nakashima	September 18, 2011
4	"Trans-Formation Se-Cret"; Transliteration: "Hen Gen An Yaku" (Japanese: 変・幻・暗・躍)	Koichi Sakamoto	Kazuki Nakashima	September 25, 2011
5	"Friend-Ship Two-Faced"; Transliteration: "Yū Jō Hyō Ri" (Japanese: 友・情・表・裏)	Hidenori Ishida	Kazuki Nakashima	October 2, 2011
6	"Blitz-Krieg Only Way"; Transliteration: "Den Geki Ichi Zu" (Japanese: 電・撃・一・途)	Hidenori Ishida	Kazuki Nakashima	October 9, 2011
7	"The King, The Jerk"; Transliteration: "Ō Sama Ya Rō" (Japanese: 王・様・野・郎)	Takayuki Shibasaki	Riku Sanjo	October 16, 2011
8	"Iron Knight's Coop-Eration"; Transliteration: "Tek Ki Ren Kei" (Japanese: 鉄・騎・連・携)	Takayuki Shibasaki	Riku Sanjo	October 23, 2011
9	"The Witch Awa-Kens"; Transliteration: "Ma Jo Kaku Sei" (Japanese: 魔・女・覚・醒)	Satoshi Morota	Riku Sanjo	October 30, 2011
10	"Moon-Light Rum-Ble"; Transliteration: "Gek Ka Geki Totsu" (Japanese: 月・下・激・突)	Satoshi Morota	Riku Sanjo	November 13, 2011
11	"Dis-Appearing Moon-Door"; Transliteration: "Shō Shitsu Tsuki To" (Japanese: 消・失・月・戸)	Ryuta Tasaki	Kazuki Nakashima	November 20, 2011
12	"Mis-Sion Ken's Life"; Transliteration: "Shi Mei Ken Mei" (Japanese: 使・命・賢・命)	Ryuta Tasaki	Kazuki Nakashima	November 27, 2011
13	"School Re-Jec-Tion"; Transliteration: "Gak Kō Kyo Zetsu" (Japanese: 学・校・拒・絶)	Hidenori Ishida	Riku Sanjo	December 4, 2011
14	"Sting-Er At-Tack"; Transliteration: "Doku Bari Mō Shū" (Japanese: 毒・針・猛・襲)	Hidenori Ishida	Riku Sanjo	December 11, 2011
15	"Holy Night Cho-Rus"; Transliteration: "Sei Ya Gas Shō" (Japanese: 聖・夜・合・唱)	Takayuki Shibasaki	Riku Sanjo	December 18, 2011
16	"Right-Wrong Con-Flict"; Transliteration: "Sei Ja Kat Tō" (Japanese: 正・邪・葛・藤)	Takayuki Shibasaki	Riku Sanjo	December 25, 2011
17	"Me-Teor Ar-Rival"; Transliteration: "Ryū Sei Tō Jō" (Japanese: 流・星・登・場)	Satoshi Morota	Kazuki Nakashima	January 8, 2012
18	"Gen/Ryu Show-Down"; Transliteration: "Gen Ryū Tai Ketsu" (Japanese: 弦・流・対・決)	Satoshi Morota	Kazuki Nakashima	January 15, 2012
19	"Steel Dragon, No Equal"; Transliteration: "Kō Ryū Mu Sō" (Japanese: 鋼・竜・無・双)	Hidenori Ishida	Riku Sanjo	January 22, 2012
20	"Excel-Lent Magne-Tism"; Transliteration: "Chō Zetsu Ji Ryoku" (Japanese: 超・絶・磁・力)	Hidenori Ishida	Riku Sanjo	January 29, 2012
21	"Gui-Dance Mis-Counseling"; Transliteration: "Shin Ro Go Dō" (Japanese: 進・路・誤・導)	Koichi Sakamoto	Kazuki Nakashima	February 5, 2012
22	"True Self Rejec-Tion"; Transliteration: "Ba Kyaku Is Shū" (Japanese: 馬・脚・一・蹴)	Koichi Sakamoto	Kazuki Nakashima	February 12, 2012
23	"The Swan Un-Ion"; Transliteration: "Haku Chō Dō Mei" (Japanese: 白・鳥・同・盟)	Kyohei Yamaguchi	Keiichi Hasegawa	February 19, 2012
24	"Hero-Ic De-Sire"; Transliteration: "Ei Yū Gan Bō" (Japanese: 英・雄・願・望)	Kyohei Yamaguchi	Keiichi Hasegawa	February 26, 2012
25	"Grad-Uation Trou-Bles"; Transliteration: "Sotsu Gyō Ushiro Gami" (Japanese: 卒・業・後・髪)	Satoshi Morota	Riku Sanjo	March 4, 2012
26	"Per-Fect Round Dance"; Transliteration: "Yū Shū Rin Bu" (Japanese: 有・終・輪・舞)	Satoshi Morota	Riku Sanjo	March 11, 2012
27	"Trans-Formation De-Nied"; Transliteration: "Hen Shin Kyak Ka" (Japanese: 変・身・却・下)	Hidenori Ishida	Kazuki Nakashima	March 18, 2012
28	"Star-Storm Come-Back"; Transliteration: "Sei Ran Sai Ki" (Japanese: 星・嵐・再・起)	Hidenori Ishida	Kazuki Nakashima	March 25, 2012
29	"Jun-Ior Sil-Ence"; Transliteration: "Kō Hai Mu Gon" (Japanese: 後・輩・無・言)	Koichi Sakamoto	Keiichi Hasegawa	April 1, 2012
30	"Sen-Ior Futil-Ity"; Transliteration: "Sen Pai Mu Yō" (Japanese: 先・輩・無・用)	Koichi Sakamoto	Keiichi Hasegawa	April 8, 2012
31	"Plei-Ades King-Dom"; Transliteration: "Subaru Boshi Ō Koku" (Japanese: 昴・星・王・国)	Koichi Sakamoto	Riku Sanjo	April 15, 2012
32	"Super Cos-Mic Sword"; Transliteration: "Chō U Chū Ken" (Japanese: 超・宇・宙・剣)	Koichi Sakamoto	Riku Sanjo	April 22, 2012
33	"Old City May-Hem"; Transliteration: "Ko To Sō Ran" (Japanese: 古・都・騒・乱)	Satoshi Morota	Kazuki Nakashima	April 29, 2012
34	"Sky Hole Offense/Defense"; Transliteration: "Ten Ketsu Kō Bō" (Japanese: 天・穴・攻・防)	Satoshi Morota	Kazuki Nakashima	May 6, 2012
35	"Mon-Ster Broad-Cast"; Transliteration: "Kai Jin Hō Sō" (Japanese: 怪・人・放・送)	Katsuya Watanabe	Keiichi Hasegawa	May 13, 2012
36	"Seri-Ous Last Song"; Transliteration: "Hon Ki Den Ka" (Japanese: 本・気・伝・歌)	Katsuya Watanabe	Keiichi Hasegawa	May 20, 2012
37	"Star Group Selec-Tion"; Transliteration: "Sei To Sen Batsu" (Japanese: 星・徒・選・抜)	Hidenori Ishida	Riku Sanjo	May 27, 2012
38	"Win-Ner Deci-Sion"; Transliteration: "Shō Sha Ket Tei" (Japanese: 勝・者・決・定)	Hidenori Ishida	Riku Sanjo	June 3, 2012
39	"Cam-Pus Ordi-Nance"; Transliteration: "Gaku En Hat To" (Japanese: 学・園・法・度)	Satoshi Morota	Keiichi Hasegawa	June 10, 2012
40	"I-Dea Pas-Sion"; Transliteration: "Ri Nen Jō Nen" (Japanese: 理・念・情・念)	Satoshi Morota	Keiichi Hasegawa	June 24, 2012
41	"The Club Col-Lapses"; Transliteration: "Bu Katsu Hō Kai" (Japanese: 部・活・崩・壊)	Kyohei Yamaguchi	Kazuki Nakashima	July 1, 2012
42	"Sagi-Tarius Con-Trols"; Transliteration: "I Te Kun Rin" (Japanese: 射・手・君・臨)	Kyohei Yamaguchi	Kazuki Nakashima	July 8, 2012
43	"Gem-Ini Light/Shade"; Transliteration: "Futa Go Mei An" (Japanese: 双・子・明・暗)	Hidenori Ishida	Riku Sanjo	July 15, 2012
44	"Star Fate Cere-Mony"; Transliteration: "Sei Un Gi Shiki" (Japanese: 星・運・儀・式)	Hidenori Ishida	Riku Sanjo	July 22, 2012
45	"Li-Bra De-Fects"; Transliteration: "Ten Bin Ri Han" (Japanese: 天・秤・離・反)	Satoshi Morota	Kazuki Nakashima	August 5, 2012
46	"Supe-Rior Sagit-Tarius"; Transliteration: "Ko Kō I Te" (Japanese: 孤・高・射・手)	Satoshi Morota	Kazuki Nakashima	August 12, 2012
47	"Close Friends Sepa-Rated"; Transliteration: "Shin Yū Betsu Ri" (Japanese: 親・友・別・離)	Koichi Sakamoto	Kazuki Nakashima	August 19, 2012
48	"Youth-Ful Gal-Axy"; Transliteration: "Sei Shun Gin Ga" (Japanese: 青・春・銀・河)	Koichi Sakamoto	Kazuki Nakashima	August 26, 2012

== Films ==
Kamen Rider Fourze made his first appearance as a cameo in the film Kamen Rider OOO Wonderful: The Shogun and the 21 Core Medals.

=== Movie War Mega Max ===
A crossover film between Kamen Rider OOO and Kamen Rider Fourze in the same vein as the Movie War 2010 and Movie War Core films, titled Kamen Rider × Kamen Rider Fourze & OOO: Movie War Mega Max (仮面ライダー×仮面ライダー フォーゼ&オーズ MOVIE大戦MEGA MAX, Kamen Raidā × Kamen Raidā Fōze Ando Ōzu Mūbī Taisen Mega Makkusu), was released in Japanese theatres on December 10, 2011. The guest star for the Fourze portion was Hello! Project member Erina Mano, who portrayed Nadeshiko Misaki who transforms into Kamen Rider Nadeshiko, the first schoolgirl Kamen Rider. The events of the movie took place between episodes 14 and 15.

=== Super Hero Taisen ===
Kamen Rider × Super Sentai: Super Hero Taisen (仮面ライダー×スーパー戦隊 スーパーヒーロー大戦, Kamen Raidā × Sūpā Sentai Sūpā Hīrō Taisen) is a film which features a crossover between the characters of the Kamen Rider and Super Sentai Series, featuring the protagonists of Kamen Rider Decade and Kaizoku Sentai Gokaiger, alongside the casts of Fourze and Tokumei Sentai Go-Busters as well. The events of the movie took place between episodes 24 and 25.

=== Space, Here We Come! ===
Kamen Rider Fourze the Movie: Space, Here We Come! (仮面ライダーフォーゼ THE MOVIE みんなで宇宙キターッ！, Kamen Raidā Fōze Za Mūbī Minna de Uchū Kitā!) is the main theatrical release for Kamen Rider Fourze, released on August 4, 2012, alongside Tokumei Sentai Go-Busters the Movie: Protect the Tokyo Enetower!. The film features the evil Kyodain (キョーダイン, Kyōdain) siblings composed of the older brother Groundain (グランダイン, Gurandain) and the younger sister Skydain (スカイダイン, Sukaidain), who are based on the heroes of Space Ironmen Kyodain. It also featured the first on-screen appearance of the 14th Heisei Kamen Rider: Kamen Rider Wizard. The events of the movie took place between episodes 38 and 39.

=== Movie War Ultimatum ===
Kamen Rider × Kamen Rider Wizard & Fourze: Movie War Ultimatum (仮面ライダー×仮面ライダー ウィザード&フォーゼ MOVIE大戦アルティメイタム, Kamen Raidā × Kamen Raidā Wizādo Ando Fōze Mūbī Taisen Arutimeitamu) was released on December 8, 2012, as the annual winter "Movie War" film. In the portion featuring the cast and characters of Kamen Rider Fourze, the story takes place five years after the events of the series. Both Erina Mano and Mikie Hara return to reprise their roles while Kenta Suga guest stars as Saburo Kazeta of a school club called the Monster Alliance who can transform into Sanagiman. The other guest stars for the Fourze portion include Rika Adachi, Kasumi Yamaya, and Toshiya Toyama.

=== Super Hero Taisen Z ===
Kamen Rider × Super Sentai × Space Sheriff: Super Hero Taisen Z (仮面ライダー×スーパー戦隊×宇宙刑事 スーパーヒーロー大戦Z, Kamen Raidā × Sūpā Sentai × Uchū Keiji Supā Hīrō Taisen Zetto) is a film released in Japan on April 27, 2013 which features the first crossover between characters of Toei's three main Tokusatsu franchises, Kamen Rider, Super Sentai, and the Space Sheriff Series representing the Metal Hero Series as a whole. The protagonists of Space Sheriff Gavan: The Movie, Tokumei Sentai Go-Busters, and Kaizoku Sentai Gokaiger are featured, but the casts of Kamen Rider Wizard, Zyuden Sentai Kyoryuger, and Kamen Rider Fourze also participate in the film. Sota Fukushi, Kenta Suga, Kohki Okada, and Ayumi Kinoshita reprise their roles voicing Kamen Rider Fourze, Inazuman, Groundain, and Skydain respectively.

=== Heisei Generations Final ===
A Movie War film, titled Kamen Rider Heisei Generations Final: Build & Ex-Aid with Legend Rider (仮面ライダー平成ジェネレーションズ FINAL ビルド&エグゼイドwithレジェンドライダー, Kamen Raidā Heisei Jenerēshonzu Fainaru Birudo Ando Eguzeido Wizu Rejendo Raidā) was released on December 9, 2017. Along the casts of Kamen Rider Build and Kamen Rider Ex-Aid, Shu Watanabe and Ryosuke Miura (Kamen Rider OOO), Sota Fukushi (Kamen Rider Fourze), Gaku Sano (Kamen Rider Gaim), and Shun Nishime (Kamen Rider Ghost) reprised their respective roles.

== Video game ==
A port of Kamen Rider: Climax Heroes titled Kamen Rider: Climax Heroes Fourze (仮面ライダー クライマックスヒーローズ フォーゼ, Kamen Raidā Kuraimakkusu Hīrōzu Fōze) was released for both the PlayStation Portable and the Wii during Winter 2011. In addition to adding Kamen Rider Fourze to the game, the Shōwa Riders (e.g., Kamen Rider #1 & Kamen Rider Black RX) were added as playable characters.

== Manga adaptation ==
A manga adaptation of Kamen Rider Fourze, written and illustrated by MegaMan NT Warrior artist Ryo Takamisaki, was first published in the February issue of CoroCoro Comic Special.

== Novel ==
Novel: Kamen Rider Fourze: Ama High Grad-Uation (小説 仮面ライダーフォーゼ ～天・高・卒・業～, Shōsetsu Kamen Raidā Fōze ~Ama Kō Sotsu Gyō~), written by Hideaki Tsukada, is part of a series of spin-off novel adaptions of the Heisei Era Kamen Riders. The events of the novel took place after the final episode. The novel was released on February 28, 2014.

== Crossover with Crayon Shin-chan ==
Four short crossover episodes, collectively titled Kamen Rider Fourze × Crayon Shin-chan (仮面ライダーフォーゼ×クレヨンしんちゃん, Kamen Raidā Fōze × Kureyon Shin-chan), between Kamen Rider Fourze and Crayon Shin-chan were shown in each show's time slots during April 2012 to promote their respective series' new films: Kamen Rider × Super Sentai: Super Hero Taisen and Crayon Shin-chan: The Storm Called!: Me and the Space Princess. The characters crossover in two episodes of each respective series. The story follows Shin-chan teaming up with Kamen Rider Fourze in order to go to space and rescue Shin's younger sister who had been taken to Planet Himawari to become its princess. The first and fourth episodes feature both anime and live-action while the second and third were entirely animated.

=== Episodes ===
1. Transform into Anime (アニメに変身だゾ, Anime ni Henshin da zo; April 13, 2012; Crayon Shin-chan time slot)
2. Com-Bined At-Tack (合・体・出・撃, Gat Tai Shutsu Geki; April 15, 2012; Kamen Rider Fourze time slot)
3. Let's Rescue Himawari (ひまわりをお助けするゾ, Himawari o Otasuke suru zo; April 27, 2012; Crayon Shin-chan time slot)
4. Just Not Enough Friends (友・達・未・満, Tomo Dachi Mi Man; April 29, 2012; Kamen Rider Fourze time slot)

== Televi-Kun DVDs ==
The Hyper Battle DVD for Fourze is titled Kamen Rider Fourze Hyper Battle DVD: Rocket Drill States of Friendship (仮面ライダーフォーゼ 超バトルDVD 友情のロケットドリルステイツ, Kamen Raidā Fōze Haipā Batoru Dī Bui Dī Yūjō no Roketto Doriru Suteitsu). Gentaro aims to become friends with Kamen Rider Amazon to obtain the Clear Drill Switch, which has crash-landed in the Amazon River.

Kamen Rider Fourze: Astroswitch Secret Report (仮面ライダーフォーゼ アストロスイッチひみつレポート, Kamen Raidā Fōze Asutorosuitchi Himitsu Repōto) is a DVD packaged with the July 2012 issue of Televi-Kun magazine. The issue also comes with a poster with the information described in the DVD. The DVD is set before the Hyper Battle DVD, and features the content normally found in the Hyper Battle DVD (explaining the powers and weapons of the Kamen Riders), explained as Tachibana, with Ryusei and Gentaro's help, gathers the data of the 40 Astroswitches to find out what and where the mysterious mass of Cosmic Energy is.

== Climax Episode ==
Kamen Rider Fourze: Climax Episode (仮面ライダーフォーゼ クライマックスエピソード, Kamen Raidā Fōze Kuraimakkusu Episōdo) is the director's cut version of the combined episodes 31 & 32. It was released on DVD and Blu-ray on October 21, 2012.

== Final Episode ==
Kamen Rider Fourze: Final Episode (仮面ライダーフォーゼ FINAL EPISODE, Kamen Raidā Fōze Fainaru Episōdo) is the director's cut version of the last two episodes. It was released on DVD and Blu-ray on February 21, 2013.

== Cast ==
- Gentaro Kisaragi (如月 弦太朗, Kisaragi Gentarō): Sota Fukushi (福士 蒼汰, Fukushi Sōta)
- Ryusei Sakuta (朔田 流星, Sakuta Ryūsei): Ryo Yoshizawa (吉沢 亮, Yoshizawa Ryō)
- Kengo Utahoshi (歌星 賢吾, Utahoshi Kengo): Ryuki Takahashi (高橋 龍輝, Takahashi Ryūki)
- Yuki Jojima (城島 ユウキ, Jōjima Yūki): Fumika Shimizu (清水 富美加, Shimizu Fumika)
- Miu Kazashiro (風城 美羽, Kazashiro Miu): Rikako Sakata (坂田 梨香子, Sakata Rikako)
- Shun Daimonji (大文字 隼, Daimonji Shun): Justin Tomimori (冨森 ジャスティン, Tomimori Justin)
- Tomoko Nozama (野座間 友子, Nozama Tomoko): Shiho (志保)
- JK (JK（ジェイク）, Jeiku): Shion Tsuchiya (土屋 シオン, Tsuchiya Shion)
- Sarina Sonoda (園田 紗理奈, Sonoda Sarina): Yuka Konan (虎南 有香, Konan Yuka)
- Chuta Ohsugi (大杉 忠太, Ōsugi Chūta): Takushi Tanaka (田中 卓志, Tanaka Takushi; of Ungirls)
- Mitsuaki Gamou (我望 光明, Gamō Mitsuaki): Shingo Tsurumi (鶴見 辰吾, Tsurumi Shingo)
- Kouhei Hayami (速水 公平, Hayami Kōhei): Kousei Amano (天野 浩成, Amano Kōsei)
- Natsuji Kijima (鬼島 夏児, Kijima Natsuji): Soran Tamoto (タモト 清嵐, Tamoto Soran)
- Kou Tatsugami (立神 吼, Tatsugami Kō): Kazutoshi Yokoyama (横山 一敏, Yokoyama Kazutoshi)
- Kuniteru Emoto (江本 州輝, Emoto Kuniteru): Hajime Yamazaki (山崎 一, Yamazaki Hajime)

=== Voice cast ===
- Scorpion Zodiarts (スコーピオン・ゾディアーツ, Sukōpion Zodiātsu): Eiji Takemoto (竹本 英史, Takemoto Eiji)
- Virgo Zodiarts (ヴァルゴ・ゾディアーツ, Varugo Zodiātsu): Rie Tanaka (田中 理恵, Tanaka Rie)
- Fourze Driver (フォーゼドライバー, Fōze Doraibā), Tachibana (タチバナ), Narrator: Nobuyuki Hiyama (檜山 修之, Hiyama Nobuyuki)

=== Guest cast ===
- Toshiya Miura (三浦 俊也, Miura Toshiya; 1–2, 13–14): Masanori Mizuno (水野 真典, Mizuno Masanori)
- Tsukasa Nishikawa (西川 司, Nishikawa Tsukasa; 3–4): Koji Saikawa (才川 コージ, Kōji Saikawa)
- Fumihiro Nitta (新田 文博, Nitta Fumihiro; 5–6): Kiyotaka Uji (宇治 清高,, Uji Kiyotaka)
- Takashi Satake (佐竹 剛, Satake Takashi; 7–8, 48): Satoshi Jinbo (神保 悟志, Jinbo Satoshi)
- Teruhiko Satake (佐竹 輝彦, Satake Teruhiko; 7–8): Ryuji Satō (佐藤 流司, Satō Ryūji)
- Takato Daimonji (大文字 高人, Daimonji Takato; 7–8): Ryo Kamon (加門 良, Kamon Ryō)
- Ritsuko Usaka (鵜坂 律子, Usaka Ritsuko; 9–10, 25–26): Hikari Kajiwara (梶原 ひかり, Kajiwara Hikari)
- Junta Abe (阿部 純太, Abe Junta; 15–16): Tokimasa Tanabe (田辺 季正, Tanabe Tokimasa)
- Haruka Utsugi (宇津木 遥, Utsugi Haruka; 21–22, 48): Nao Nagasawa (長澤 奈央, Nagasawa Nao)
- Man at kick boxing gym (21–22): Koji Nakamura (中村 浩二, Nakamura Kōji)
- Norio Eguchi (江口 規夫, Eguchi Norio; 23–24): Shugo Nagashima (永嶋 柊吾, Nagashima Shūgo)
- Yayoi Tokuda (徳田 弥生, Tokuda Yayoi; 25–26): Kasumi Suzuki (鈴木 かすみ, Suzuki Kasumi)
- Members of light music club (26): Kamen Rider Girls (仮面ライダーGIRLS, Kamen Raidā Gāruzu)
- Nao Yasuda (安田 奈央, Yasuda Nao)
- Erika Yoshizumi (吉住 絵里加, Yoshizumi Erika)
- Kaori Nagura (名倉 かおり, Nagura Kaori)
- Hitomi Isaka (井坂 仁美, Isaka Hitomi)
- Mitsuki Endo (遠藤 三貴, Endō Mitsuki)
- Member of light music club (26): tatsuo (of everset)
- Member of light music club (26), JK's father (Young) (35): Ryo (of defspiral)
- Member of light music club (26): Masaki (of defspiral)
- Member of light music club (26): AYANO (of FULL AHEAD)
- Goro Kisaragi (如月 吾郎, Kisaragi Gorō; 27, 44): Nobuo Yana (八名 信夫, Yana Nobuo)
- Mei Shirakawa (白川 芽以, Shirakawa Mei; 30-32): Runa Natsui (夏居 瑠奈, Natsui Runa)
- Yukina Takamura (高村 優希奈, Takamura Yukina; 33–34): Mika Akizuki (秋月 三佳, Akizuki Mika)
- Keisuke Yanami (矢波 敬介, Yanami Keisuke; 39–40): Ryotaro Sakaguchi (坂口 涼太郎, Sakaguchi Ryōtaro)
- Yuki's father (43–44): Yuu Kamio (神尾 佑, Kamio Yū)
- Haruto Soma (操真 晴人, Sōma Haruto; 48): Shunya Shiraishi (白石 隼也, Shiraishi Shun'ya)

== Songs ==
Opening theme

- "Switch On!"
  - Lyrics: Shoko Fujibayashi
  - Composition & Arrangement: tatsuo (of everset)
  - Artist: Anna Tsuchiya (土屋 アンナ, Tsuchiya Anna)
  Anna Tsuchiya decided to perform the opening theme for Kamen Rider Fourze after her young son became a fan of Kamen Rider OOO and because of her own fond memories of watching Kamen Rider Series shows as a child herself. A symphonic variation titled "Switch On! Orchestra Version" was played in the final two episodes.

Insert themes

- "Giant Step"
  - Lyrics: Shoko Fujibayashi
  - Composition & Arrangement: Shuhei Naruse
  - Artist: Astronauts (May'n & Yoshiharu Shiina)
  - Episodes: 6–16, 18–19, 23–25
  Astronauts is a special band formed by May'n and former Surface vocalist Yoshiharu Shiina for Kamen Rider Fourze.
- "Shooting Star"
  - Lyrics: Shoko Fujibayashi
  - Composition & Arrangement: tatsuo (of everset)
  - Artist: everset
  - Episodes: 16–18, 21–22, 26, 29
  "Shooting Star" is Kamen Rider Meteor's theme song. The band everset previously contributed to the Kamen Rider Series as being Kamen Rider W's fictional Galveston 19.
- "Bounce Back"
  - Lyrics: Shoko Fujibayashi
  - Composition & Arrangement: Yosuke Yamashita (山下 洋介, Yamashita Yōsuke)
  - Artist: Southern (Minami Kuribayashi & Yosuke Yamashita)
  - Episodes: 20–22, 31
  "Bounce Back" is the theme song for Kamen Rider Fourze Magnet States. SoutherN is a special band formed by Minami Kuribayashi and former NovaQuorb vocalist Yosuke Yamashita.
- "ENDLESS PLAY"
  - Lyrics: Shoko Fujibayashi
  - Composition: TAKUYA
  - Arrangement: Keisuke Iizuka, TAKUYA
  - Artist: Astronauts feat. SHIINA (Yoshiharu Shiina)
  - Episodes: 21, 29, 48
  "ENDLESS PLAY" was originally solely the theme song for Kamen Rider: Climax Heroes Fourze. It is a solo performance by Yoshiharu Shiina as "Astronauts feat. SHIINA".
- "Evolvin' Storm"
  - Lyrics: Shoko Fujibayashi
  - Composition & Arrangement: tatsuo (of everset)
  - Artist: everset
  - Episodes: 28–30, 36
  "Evolvin' Storm" is Kamen Rider Meteor Storm's theme song.
- "COSMIC MIND"
  - Lyrics: Shoko Fujibayashi
  - Composition & Arrangement: Shuhei Naruse
  - Artist: Astronauts (May'n & Yoshiharu Shiina)
  - Episodes: 32–35, 37, 40–46, 48
  "Cosmic Mind" is the theme song for Kamen Rider Fourze Cosmic States.

Other songs

- "Ganbare, Hayabusa-kun" (がんばれ、はやぶさくん; "Go, Hayabusa")
  - Artist: Yuki Jojima (Fumika Shimizu)
  - Episodes: 3, 15–16
  A song Yuki made up to praise the Hayabusa satellite. A version including the AGHS glee club is featured on the series' second original soundtrack.
- "Saite" (咲いて; "Blooming")
  - Lyrics: Tsuyoshi Himura & Tenji Nagano
  - Composition: Tenji Nagano
  - Arrangement: Shuhei Naruse
  - Artist: Kamen Rider Girls
  - Episodes: 26, 48
  The Kamen Rider Girls make a guest appearance in episode 26 where they perform their cover of everset's "Saite". This was also used as the background song in episode 48 during the graduation scene of the final battle.
- "Hayabusa Metal" (はやぶさメタル, Hayabusa Metaru)
  - Artist: Kamen Rider Club Band
  - Episodes: 35
  A rock variation of "Hayabusa-kun".
- "Love is Overdrive"
  - Lyrics: Shoko Fujibayashi
  - Composition: DJ HURRY KENN
  - Arrangement: AYANO (of FULL AHEAD)
  - Artist: JK (Shion Tsuchiya)
  - Episodes: 35–36
  A song JK makes up under the alias of Gene. With the Capricorn Zodiarts' power, JK sing the "God and Gene version" of the song.
- "Oyaji no Blues" (親父のブルース, Oyaji no Burūsu; "Father Blues")
  - Lyrics: Shoko Fujibayashi
  - Composition: DJ HURRY KENN
  - Arrangement: AYANO (of FULL AHEAD)
  - Artist: JK (Shion Tsuchiya)
  - Episodes: 36
  A song JK learned from his father.

The first soundtrack for Kamen Rider Fourze was released on December 21, 2011. A second soundtrack was later released on June 27, 2012. The Kamen Rider Fourze: Music States Collection' album, containing all vocal tracks from the series, was released on July 25, 2012. A special box collection was released on August 29, 2012, containing all of the songs and background music featured throughout the series and its films.
