= Change Your Life (Anna Tsuchiya song) =

Single by Anna Tsuchiya

from the album Strip Me?
- Released: 25 January 2006
- Genre: Pop, rock
- Label: Avex
- Songwriter(s): Anna Tsuchiya, Suzanne Standfast, Patrick Standfast, Joa Hemmer

Anna Tsuchiya singles chronology
| "Change Your Life" (2006) | "Slap that Naughty Body / My Fate" (2006) |

"Change Your Life" is the debut single by Japanese singer Anna Tsuchiya, released on 25 January 2006, under the Mad Pray Records label, a subsidiary of Avex. It spent five weeks in the Oricon Style singles chart, reaching number 35 on 2 February 2006. The lyrics were written by Tsuchiya, with the music by Suzanne Standfast, Patrick Standfast and Joa Heimer.

== Track listing ==
All lyrics are written by ANNA (Anna Tsuchiya)

| No. | Title | Music | Arranger(s) | Length |
|---|---|---|---|---|
| 1. | "Change Your Life" | Suzanne Standfast, Patrick Standfast, Joa Hemmer | Gary Newby |
| 2. | "Only Want You" | Anthony Mazza | Chokkaku |
| 3. | "Every Moment" | Joey Carbone | Newby |
| 4. | "Change Your Life" (Version 5) | Standfast, standfast, Hemmer | Newby |
