= Reunion Wilderness =

Studio album by the Railway Children
- Released: May 1987
- Studio: Revolution
- Genre: Alternative rock; jangle pop; new wave
- Label: Factory
- Producer: The Railway Children; Mike Johnson; Nick Garside

The Railway Children chronology
Reunion Wilderness (1987)	Recurrence (1988)

Reunion Wilderness is the debut album by English band the Railway Children, released in 1987 by record label Factory. It topped the UK Independent Albums Chart.

== Reception ==
Professional ratings
Review scores
Source	Rating
AllMusic	3/5 stars
New Musical Express	9/10

Trouser Press wrote: "Gary Newby's attractive voice is the band's only notable asset; otherwise this exercise in ringing electric guitars and briskly strummed acoustics is entirely routine."

== Track listing ==
Original CD edition
No.	Title	Length
1.	"Another Town"	2:55
2.	"The First Notebook"	3:56
3.	"Railroad Side"	3:17
4.	"Careful"	3:52
5.	"Brighter"	4:54
6.	"Big Hands of Freedom"	3:55
7.	"Listen On"	2:57
8.	"A Gentle Sound" (omitted from vinyl edition)	3:15
9.	"Content" (omitted from vinyl edition)	3:48
