= Rose (Anna Tsuchiya song) =

"rose"

Single by Anna Tsuchiya

from the album Strip Me?
- B-side: "Lovin' you"
- Released: 28 June 2006
- Recorded: 2006
- Genre: Punk rock, alternative rock
- Label: Avex Trax

Anna Tsuchiya singles chronology
"Slap that Naughty Body / My Fate'" (2006)	"rose" (2006)	"Kuroi Namida" (2007)

Music video
- "Rose" on YouTube

"rose" is the third single by Japanese singer Anna Tsuchiya under the pseudonym ANNA inspi' NANA (BLACK STONES). It was released on 28 June 2006 by Mad Pray Records, a subsidiary of Avex. It is Tsuchiya's highest ranking song, spending ten weeks on the Oricon Style chart and reaching #6 on 10 July 2006.

== Track listing ==
All lyrics are written by ANNA (Anna Tsuchiya).

No.	Title	Music	Arranger(s)	Length
1.	"rose"	Ayumi Miyazaki	Ayumi Miyazaki
2.	"Lovin' you"	Joey Carbone, Anthony Mazza, Ron Harris	Gary Newby
3.	"Ah Ah"	Paul Rein, Winston Sela, Daniel Eklund	LOW IQ 01

== Commercial endorsements ==
"rose" was used as the opening theme to the anime adaptation of the manga NANA. Its B-side, "Lovin' You", was the theme for the Japanese release of the film Silent Hill.
