= Bubble Trip/Sweet Sweet Song =

"Bubble Trip / Sweet Sweet Song"

Single by Anna Tsuchiya
- Released: 1 August 2007
- Recorded: 2007
- Genre: R&B, J-pop, Rock, Pop rock
- Label: Avex Trax
- Songwriters: Negin, Siam Kamli, Brian Kierulf, Joshua Schwartz (Bubble Strip and Sweet Sweet Song

Anna Tsuchiya singles chronology
"LUCY" (2007)	"Bubble Trip / Sweet Sweet Song" (2007)	"Cocoon" (2008)

CD+DVD Cover

Music video
- "Bubble Trip" on YouTube

"Bubble Trip / Sweet Sweet Song" is the sixth single of singer Anna Tsuchiya. This single to be released in two versions: a limited edition CD+DVD version and a regular CD only version. BUBBLE TRIP is described as a song that blends R&B and rock, and is produced by KNS Productions(who had previously produced songs from Britney Spears third and fourth albums). The song was used as the Herbal Essences Japan CM song. The other A-side, sweet sweet song, was used as the Daiichikosho karaoke company Premium DAM CM song.

== Track listing ==
All lyrics are written by ANNA (Anna Tsuchiya).

CD
No.	Title	Music	Arranger(s)	Length
1.	"Bubble Trip"	Negin, Siam Kamli, Brian Kierulf, Joshua Schwartz	Negin, Brian Kierulf, Joshua Schwartz	2:58
2.	"Sweet Sweet Song"	Ayumi Miyazaki	Ayumi Miyazaki	3:15
3.	"Bubble Trip" (Studio Apartment Remix)	Negin, Siam Kamli, Brian Kierulf, Joshua Schwartz	Negin, Brian Kierulf, Joshua Schwartz	6:09

DVD
No.	Title	Length
1.	"Bubble Trip" (Music video)
