= Every Beat of the Heart =

1990 single by the Railway Children

Single by the Railway Children

from the album Native Place
- B-side: "Everybody"; "Give It Away"; "Strange Attractor"
- Released: February 1990
- Recorded: Mid-1989
- Studio: Townhouse, Battery (London, England)
- Genre: Pop
- Length: 4:08
- Label: Virgin
- Songwriter: Gary Newby
- Producers: Steve Lovell; Steve Power

The Railway Children singles chronology
"Over and Over" (1988)	"Every Beat of the Heart" (1990)	"Music Stop" (1990)

Music video
- "Every Beat of the Heart" on YouTube

"Every Beat of the Heart" is a song by English new wave band the Railway Children, released as the lead single from their third studio album, Native Place (1990), in February 1990 by Virgin Records. The track was written by lead singer Gary Newby while production was helmed by Steve Lovell and Steve Power, and it was recorded in London in mid-1989. Music critics responded positively to the song, calling it an improvement on the band's earlier works.

Upon its initial release in 1990, the song reached number 68 on the UK Singles Chart and topped the US Billboard Modern Rock Tracks chart that September. The song was re-released in the UK in January 1991, peaking at number 24 the following month, and it also reached the top 30 in Ireland. A music video was filmed to promote the single.

== Critical reception ==
Jane Silley of British newspaper Record Mirror noted that "Every Beat of the Heart" is an improvement compared to the Railway Children's previous works. In a later review from the same publication, Tim Nicholson called it an "elastic" pop track that returned the band to form. David Giles of British trade paper Music Week compared the song to a "poppier" New Order track and praised the B-side "Everybody". Music & Media magazine described the recording as a "well-crafted" and anthemic song and later called it a "well-deserved" hit. Reviewing Native Place on AllMusic, Michael Sutton wrote that song has "shimmering", "invigorating", and "addictive" riffs.

Retrospectively, in 2017, online magazine Consequence ranked "Every Beat of the Heart" at number 323 out of 354 on their list of "Every Alternative Rock No. 1 Hit from Worst to Best", questioning its placement on alternative radio and referring to it as a "palpitation" rather than a "steady bumping". Reviewing the song for his "The Alternative Number Ones" column, Tom Breihan of Stereogum rated the song a 6 out of 10, writing that although the song does not transcend the zeitgeist of early 1990s pop music, it is "pretty good" and "doesn't aim to be anything bigger than pleasant bop-around music".

== Chart performance ==
In the United Kingdom, "Every Beat of the Heart" first appeared at number 93 on the UK Singles Chart on the week starting 25 February 1990. After four weeks, it reached its initial peak of number 68, spending six weeks within the top 100 during its first chart run. After the band's next two singles, "Music Stop" and "So Right", reached similar peaks, "Every Beat of the Heart" was re-released in 1991. This time, the song entered the UK Singles Chart at number 59 and ascended to number 24 on 17 February 1991, giving the Railway Children their highest-charting UK single as well as their longest-charting single, spending 12 weeks within the top 100 altogether. In neighbouring Ireland, the song entered the top 30 of the Irish Singles Chart for a single week in February 1991, peaking at number 28.

After the song's first release in the UK, numerous US rock radio stations began adding the song to their playlists in June 1990. The following month, on 21 July, the song debuted at number 23 on the Billboard Modern Rock Tracks chart. Over the next seven weeks, the song rose up the ranking until peaking at number one on the week of 8 September 1990. Afterwards, the single spent two more weeks in the top 30 before dropping out from number 13 on 29 September.

== Music video ==
The music video for "Every Beat of the Heart" features the Railway Children performing the song interspersed with clips of Gary Newby observing a woman in a city. The video was added to MTV's playlists on the week ending 21 July 1990 and also aired on American music programme Night Tracks starting in mid-August.

== Track listings ==
All songs were written by Gary Newby.

- UK 7-inch and cassette single
1. "Every Beat of the Heart"
2. "Everybody"
3. "Give It Away"
- UK 10-inch, 12-inch, and CD single
1. "Every Beat of the Heart"
2. "Everybody"
3. "Give It Away"
4. "Strange Attractor"
- US cassette single and Japanese mini-CD single
1. "Every Beat of the Heart"
2. "Everybody"

== Credits and personnel ==
Credits are lifted from the Native Place album booklet.

Studios

- Recorded in mid-1989 at Townhouse Studios and Battery Studios (London, England)
- Mixed at Strawberry Studios (Stockport, England)

The Railway Children

- Gary Newby – writing, vocals, guitar, keyboard, mixing
- Brian Bateman – rhythm guitar
- Stephen Hull – bass
- Guy Keegan – drums, percussion

Additional personnel

- Matt Irving – additional keyboard
- Steve Lovell – production
- Steve Power – production
- Richard Scott – mixing

== Charts ==
Chart (1990–1991)	Peak position
Europe (Eurochart Hot 100)	75
Ireland (IRMA)	28
UK Singles (OCC)	24
UK Airplay (Music Week)	12
US Modern Rock Tracks (Billboard)	1

== Release history ==
Region	Date	Format(s)	Label(s)	Ref.
United Kingdom	February 1990	7-inch vinyl; 10-inch vinyl; 12-inch vinyl; CD; cassette	Virgin	
Japan	21 June 1990	Mini-CD	Virgin	
United States	1990	Cassette	Virgin	
United Kingdom (re-release)	21 January 1991	7-inch vinyl	Virgin	
Australia	18 March 1991	7-inch vinyl; cassette	Virgin	
