= Friedia Niimura =

Japanese businessperson

- Born: Germany
- Other names: Rin Kozue
- Occupation: Businessperson
- Website: friedia.com

Friedia Niimura is a Japanese businessperson. Born in Germany, she lived in the USA until she was 13, then moved to Japan for approximately 10 years, working as a tarento under the stage name Rin Kozue (こずえ 鈴, Kozue Rin), but returned to the United States in 2005. As of 2022, she is the owner of a Los Angeles stationery shop called Paper Plant.
