= Switch On! =

- Cover for the CD+DVD combo pack featuring singer Anna Tsuchiya

Single by Anna Tsuchiya
- Released: November 23, 2011
- Genre: J-Pop
- Length: 3:23
- Label: Avex Trax
- Songwriters: Shoko Fujibayashi, tatsuo

Anna Tsuchiya singles chronology
"Unchained Girl" (2011)	"Switch On!" (2011)	"Voyagers" (2012)

Kamen Rider Series theme song singles chronology
"Anything Goes!" (2010)	"Switch On!" (2011)	"Life Is Show Time" (2012)

Alternate cover
- Cover for the CD-only version featuring Kamen Rider Fourze Base States

"Switch On!" is the 13th single by Japanese pop singer Anna Tsuchiya, released on November 23, 2011.

== Development ==
Tsuchiya decided to collaborate with the Kamen Rider Series after her son became a fan of the previous series Kamen Rider OOO, and she had watched the series as a child herself. She was also glad that she was going to perform the song for the franchise's 40th anniversary. The song was written by Shoko Fujibayashi (lyrics) and tatsuo of the band everset (composition and arrangement).

== Release ==
The single was initially scheduled to be released on October 26, 2011. However its release, along with the release of Maki Ohguro's balladic version of "Anything Goes!", were pushed back by a month for unknown reasons.

== Reception ==
Switch On! is the opening theme for the Kamen Rider Series Kamen Rider Fourze and debuted on the Oricon's daily charts at number 15, while its music video hit number 3 on the RecoChoku video download charts.

The single ultimately peaked at number 13 on the Oricon's Weekly Charts and 24 on the Billboard Japan Hot 100. The song was certified gold by the RIAJ for 100,000 downloads to cellphones in August 2012.

== Track listing ==
All lyrics are written by Shoko Fujibayashi; all music is composed by tatsuo.

CD
No.	Title	Arranger(s)	Length
1.	"Switch On!"	tatsuo	3:23
2.	"Switch On!" (Rock'n Roll States edit.)	Nao Harada	3:13
3.	"Switch On!" (Space Techno States edit.)	ikutaMachine	3:55
4.	"Switch On!" (instrumental)	tatsuo	3:21
Total length:			13:54

DVD
No.	Title	Length
1.	"Switch On!" (Music Clip)
