= Pushim =

Japanese musician (born 1975)

Pushim プシン
- Born: Paku Pushin 朴 冨心; November 26, 1975 (age 50)
- Origin: Osaka, Japan
- Genres: Reggae, dancehall, soul, R&B, jazz, pop, hip hop
- Years active: 1995 - present
- Label: Sony Music Japan
- Website: PUSHIM Official Homepage

Pushim (プシン; born November 26, 1975), born Paku Pushin (朴 冨心), is a Japanese reggae artist. She is signed to Sony Music Japan's Ki/oon Records division.

She began performing in the Kansai reggae scene in 1995. In 1998, she contributed back-up vocals for the Refugee Camp's "It's Too Late", a Carole King cover. After being signed to Sony Music Japan, she recorded and released her first single, "Brand New Day" on June 19, 1999 to much critical acclaim. In September 1999, she released her second single "Strong Woman", which was also a commercial success. The following spring, her debut album Say Greetings was released, having been recorded in Jamaica the previous year. She performed at Reggae Sumfest in 2003. Her 2006 album Sing A Song... Lighter! featured Luciano on one track. She has regularly visited Jamaica to record, and in 2007, she recorded in Jamaica with musicians including Sly & Robbie.

In 2010 she was nominated for the 'Best Reggae Video' award at the MTV Video Music Awards (VMA) Japan.

Pushim is Zainichi Korean. Her younger sister, Youngshim, is also a reggae musician in the Osaka area.

== Discography ==
=== Extended plays ===
Date of Release	Title	Label	Chart positions	JP sales	Certification
June 19, 1999	Brand New Day	Sony Music Japan	4	16,000	
April 10, 2002	Pak's Groove	Sony Music Japan	29	15,000	
June 8, 2011	Messenger	Sony Music Japan			
October 10, 2012	Setting Sun				

=== Studio albums ===
Date of Release	Title	Label	Chart positions	JP sales	Certification
March 8, 2000	Say Greetings!	Sony Music Japan	4	36,000	
July 4, 2001	Colors	Sony Music Japan	13	73,000	
May 3, 2003	Pieces	Sony Music Japan	10	127,000	Gold
December 17, 2003	Working Girl	Sony Music Japan			
August 4, 2004	Queendom	Sony Music Japan	6	88,000	
August 3, 2005	Dazzlez – Song of Songs	Sony Music Japan			
July 26, 2006	Sing a Song... Lighter!	Sony Music Japan	9	57,000	
February 13, 2008	Platinum Pushim	Sony Music Japan			
June 4, 2014	15th - The Best of Pushim	Sony Music Japan			

=== Singles ===
- [1999.06.19] Brand New Day
- [1999.10.01] STRONG WOMAN
- [2000.02.02] GREETINGS!
- [2000.05.03] Fruit Moon (Kajitsu no Gatsu/ 果実の月)
- [2000.10.12] SET ME FREE (feat. DJ Premier)
- [2001.04.25] heavenly
- [2001.06.20] Music Is Mystic (feat. BOXER KID)
- [2002.08.07] FOREVER
- [2003.02.05] I Wanna Know You
- [2003.04.23] DANCE HALLIC
- [2004.01.07] Like a sunshine, my memory
- [2004.06.16] SOLDIER
- [2004.07.22] a song dedicated
- [2005.07.27] Anything For You
- [2006.07.05] I pray
- [2006.10.04] I Say Yeah!
- [2007.08.22] HEY BOY
- [2008.07.02] RAINBOW
- [2008.10.22] Renaissance
- [2009.09.23] My Endless Love
- [2012.10.10] Setting Sun
- [2013.03.13] HEAT (feat. Ego-Wrappin')
- [2014.06.04] Light Up Your Fire
- [2015.12.14] Feel It
- [2016.01.13] People In The Shadow

== Filmography ==
- Happyend (2024), Fukuko
