= Spin Aqua =

Spin Aqua were a short-lived musical project between the model Anna Tsuchiya and the former Oblivion Dust guitarist K.A.Z. The duo performed music together for a year and seven months, releasing music for less than a year on the popular label Ki/oon Records.

== Information ==
The band debuted with the single "Unchained", which was followed up with Spin Aqua's first concert in December at the Tokyo Bay NK Hall at the Devilock '02 concert. This single was followed up five months later with "Mermaid," then three months later, the single "Paper Moon". Out of these three singles, "Mermaid" was the only one that charted on Oricon charts (peaking at No. 197).

Spin Aqua's debut album and debut DVD release, Pisces and Spin Aqua Films - 1st Session, were both released a month after the last single. The album fared similarly poorly on the charts, reaching a low position of No. 187.

The band would later slip into hiatus due to Tsuchiya's pregnancy and engagement to fellow model Joshua. In mid-2004 it was announced that Spin Aqua had permanently disbanded.

== Discography ==
=== Albums ===
- 2003: Pisces

=== Singles ===
- 2002: "Unchained"
- 2003: "Mermaid"
- 2003: "Paper Moon"

=== DVD / VHS ===
- 2003: Spin Aqua Films - 1st Session
