= Kuroi Namida =

"Kuroi Namida" "黒い涙"

Single by Anna Tsuchiya

from the album Anna Tsuchiya Inspi' Nana (Black Stones)
- B-side: "Just Can't Get Enough", "I'm addicted to you"
- Released: 10 January 2007
- Genre: Alternative rock
- Label: Avex Trax
- Songwriters: Megumi Takeuchi, Hiroki Nagase

Anna Tsuchiya singles chronology
"rose" (2006)	"Kuroi Namida" "黒い涙" (2007)	"Lucy" (2007)

Music video
- "Kuroi Namida" on YouTube

"Kuroi Namida" (黒い涙, lit. 'Black Tears') is the fourth single by Japanese singer Anna Tsuchiya, released on 10 January 2007 under the pseudonym "Anna Tsuchiya inspi' Nana (Black Stones)" on the Mad Pray Records Label, a sub-label to Avex. It spent six weeks in the Oricon singles chart, reaching #7 on 22 January 2007. The song was used as an ending theme to the anime-adaption of the Japanese manga Nana. It was Tsuchiya's second single used in the series, the first being "Rose".

The B-side, a cover of the Depeche Mode song "Just Can't Get Enough" but with a different arrangement, was used in a TV commercial for the Nissan March.

== Track listing ==
No.	Title	Lyrics	Music	Arranger(s)	Length
1.	"Kuroi Namida"	Megumi Takeuchi	Hiroki Nagase	Gary Newby
2.	"Just Can't Get Enough"	Vince Clarke	Vince Clarke	Gary Newby
3.	"I'm Addicted to You"	ANNA (Anna Tsuchiya)	Katsumi Ohnishi	CHOKbich
4.	"Kuroi Namida" (Deep Sadness Version)
