= Rie Eto =

Japanese popular music artist (born 1973)

Rie Eto 衛藤利恵
- Also known as: amber
- Born: September 29, 1973 (age 52)
- Occupation: Singer

Rie Eto (衛藤 利恵, Eto Rie) (born September 29, 1973) is a Japanese popular music artist. She released the majority of her singles and albums under her real name, but from 2000 to 2001 she used the stage name amber. She has released no new material herself since 2001, but has composed songs for other artists like Spin Aqua.

== Discography ==
=== Singles ===
- Tenshi no Hohoemi (30 November 1994)
- sometime something (10 March 1995)
- The GIRL (10 October 1995)
- Kono Umi he (25 February 1996)
- Himawari (25 June 1996)
- Paysage (25 May 1997)
- Paradise In Me (10 August 1997)
- High & Low ep (1 October 2000)
- Namida no Marijji (22 August 2001)

=== Albums ===
- Be there (25 April 1995)
- Single collection (25 April 1996)
- 6 Months 11 Dreams (25 July 1996)
- Love Can Smooth The Way (25 September 1997)
- French Connection (3 June 1998)
- 2:00 AM or later (18 October 2000)
