= Anna Tsuchiya =

Japanese singer and actress (born 1984)

- 土屋 アンナ
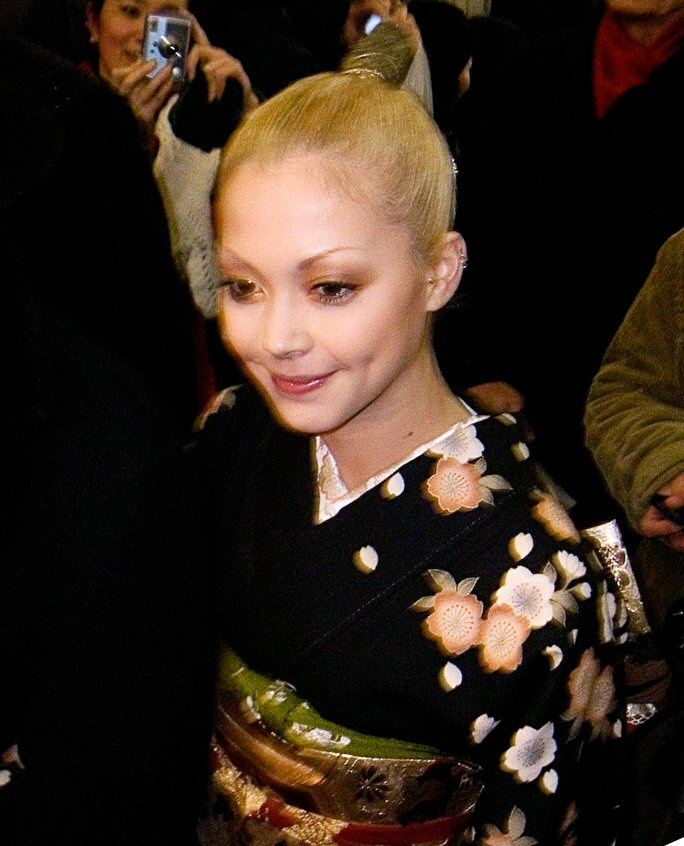
- Tsuchiya in 2007
- Born: March 11, 1984 (age 42); Shibuya, Tokyo, Japan
- Other name: ANNA TSUCHIYA inspi' NANA
- Occupations: Singer; actress; model
- Agent: Back Stage Entertainment
- Spouses: Joshua Niimura (m. 2004; div. 2006); Yamato Kikuchi (m. 2009; div. 2016)
- Children: 4
- Musical career
- Origin: Tokyo, Japan
- Genres: Pop rock; alternative rock; punk rock; pop punk
- Instrument: Vocals
- Years active: 1998–present
- Label: Mad Pray

Anna Tsuchiya (土屋 アンナ, Tsuchiya Anna; born March 11, 1984) is a Japanese singer, actress and semi-retired model. Since 2005, she is primarily known as a singer.

== Life and career ==
=== Early life ===
Tsuchiya was born in Tokyo to a Japanese mother and an American father of Polish descent (the surname of her father is Hider). In her earliest years, she spoke English and Japanese. Tsuchiya's parents divorced when she was seven. She has an older sister, Angela.

=== Modeling career ===
Tsuchiya's modeling career began at the age of fourteen after her older sister Angela, a former fashion model, suggested it. She entered her sister's former agency and was picked up by an agent who specialized in magazine-modeling. Her first jobs consisted of modeling for an open collection in Kobe and for Japanese Seventeen in 1998. Demand for her grew and by 2002, she was doing television commercials for Uniqlo and Edwin.

=== Inspiration for "Ichigo" ===
Her best known role in acting was as Ichigo Shirayuri—a rural-delinquent biker-gang girl turned fashion model – in the 2004 movie Kamikaze Girls. Ichigo as a model was portrayed as one with tendencies for violent behavior and delinquency. This Blue Ribbon Award-winning role, quite different from the one in the original work written by author and designer Nobara Takemoto, was loosely based on Tsuchiya's actual story which she later revealed after the movie's release.

=== Retirement ===
Tsuchiya retired from modeling at 18. She has said that she realized she could no longer compete with "gifted ones" like Emi Suzuki. She remains in demand for fashion and lifestyle magazines like Kera, Soup, and Zipper.

On June 2, 2007, Tsuchiya attended the official retirement ceremony for the sumo wrestler Kyokushuzan held in Ryogoku Kokugikan, presented him with a bouquet, and appeared in his memorial photobook released on June 4, 2007.

=== Use of dialects ===
Although born and raised in Tokyo, she sometimes uses Kyushu or Okinawa slang and speaks in southern dialects especially when she is drunk and on the radio. She has explained that the majority of the models she encountered were from the southern islands or the north, so she learned slang from them. This helped the development of her character Ichigo, the Bōsōzoku delinquent, in Kamikaze Girls.

=== Music career ===
Tsuchiya sang in her school choir and has been involved in the music industry since age 16. At 18, she terminated her contract with Japanese Seventeen, and supposedly decided to leave show business altogether. However, after an offer by former Oblivion Dust member K.A.Z, she invested in her music career. In mid-2002, she formed the rock duo Spin Aqua with K.A.Z. Tsuchiya has said her influences have changed over the years, from Whitney Houston, Diana Ross, Cyndi Lauper, Bette Midler, and Mariah Carey, to Bon Jovi and Guns N' Roses.

Soon after she debuted as a singer, she was dubbed "The Second Nanase" because of her resemblance to Nanase Aikawa. Spin Aqua released three singles, one album, and a video collection, without commercial success. In 2004, Tsuchiya became pregnant, and the group disbanded.

In the Japanese version of the 2006 film Silent Hill, her song "Lovin' You" is used.

In 2005, Tsuchiya announced plans to begin a solo career. On August 24 of that year, she released her first mini-album, Taste My Beat, on Avex Group's sub-label, Mad Pray Records. Her first single was "Change Your Life", followed by a second single entitled "Slap that Naughty Body" / "My Fate". After these releases, Tsuchiya released her first remix album, Taste My Xxxremixxxxxxx!!!!!!!! Beat Life! Her third single, "Rose", was used as the opening theme for Nana; Olivia Lufkin's "Starless Night" was used as the ending theme. This boosted Tsuchiya's music career, as "Rose" reached No. 6 on the Oricon charts and become her first Top Ten Hit.

In July 2006, Tsuchiya made her first overseas appearance at the Japan Expo in Paris, France. During this time, to boost her popularity, she also debuted her album Strip Me?.

In early 2007, after a short hiatus, she returned to the music scene with a new single called "Kuroi Namida". This song would also be featured in the Nana anime. This was followed by the third Nana anime opening single, "Lucy", in early February. This directly preceded a second full-length Nana album, titled Anna Tsuchiya Inspi' Nana (Black Stones), which contained singles from the show and new songs. A quasi-soundtrack album called Nana Best was then released, which included popular and unreleased songs by both her and Olivia Lufkin from the TV series. In March 2007, Lufkin's and Tsuchiya's songs from these albums were played at Shibuya AX in Tokyo in March 2007.

On June 30 of the same year, Tsuchiya performed at Anime Expo in Long Beach, California, followed by performances on July 27 at Pentaport Rock Festival in South Korea, and on July 29 at Formoz Festival in Taiwan. Called Tsichiya's "World Fez Tour", the series of performances concluded with a summer tour in Japan, which included a performance for a second time at Summer Sonic Festival. Shortly after the conclusion of the tour, Tsuchiya released her single "Bubble Trip" / "Sweet Sweet Song" on August 1.

The single "Cocoon" was released on January 30, 2008, followed in June by the single "Crazy World" which was a collaboration with the Japanese EMI Music recording artist AI. Tsuchiya released a third single in September 2008, "Virgin Cat", which was used to promote the show The L Word in Japan.

In October 2008, she released her third full-length album, the sexually explicit Nudy Show!

In 2008, Tsuchiya's song "Guilty" was featured in the ending credits of the film Resident Evil: Degeneration.

In 2009 Tsuchiya performed a set with a full orchestra at the New Classic Gig in Tokyo, revealing herself as a fan of Chopin and his "Revolutionary Etude" in particular. The orchestra included 70 members and the show was broadcast in 38 countries.

In May 2010, Tsuchiya's remix of her Nudy Show! album was released, titled Nudy xxxremixxxxxxx!!!!!!!! Show!

On November 23, 2011, she released "Switch On!", her thirteenth single. It is the opening theme for the Kamen Rider Series, Kamen Rider Fourze. She decided to record the song because her son was a fan of the previous series, Kamen Rider OOO. She herself watched earlier versions while growing up. On August 22, 2012, she released another Kamen Rider single: Voyagers, the theme song to Kamen Rider Fourze the Movie: Space, Here We Come!.

In 2012, Tsuchiya's song "Carry On" was featured in the ending credits of the film Resident Evil: Damnation.

=== Acting career ===
Tsuchiya made her acting debut in 2004 in Novala Takemoto's adapted hit Kamikaze Girls as the girl biker punk yankī "Ichigo Shirayuri". This role brought her both immediate attention and critical success, with Tsuchiya winning several awards in Japan.

Tsuchiya's success in acting continued with various movie performances and appearances in dramas such as Katsuhito Ishii's The Taste of Tea which played at Cannes, the 2007 live-action remake of Dororo, and as the voice of Lindsay Lohan's character "Maggie Peyton" in the Japanese dub of Herbie: Fully Loaded. In February 2007's Sakuran she played the rebellious but beautiful courtesan Kiyoha in a live action adaptation of the manga.

Her latest performance in a film is starring in the live-action adaptation of the manga The Legend of Kamui.

In addition to acting, she has also been known for her impersonation skills, of many martial artists and wrestlers, most notably Wanderlei Silva, Melvin Manhoef and Jun Kasai.

== Personal life ==
In 2004, Tsuchiya announced her engagement to model and actor Joshua Niimura, the younger brother of model Friedia Niimura (Rin Kozue). On November 19, 2004, Tsuchiya gave birth to their first child, a son named Sky (澄海, Sukai) who is featured in a photobook with his mother, titled, Happy Days – Anna, Mama ni Naru!. In July 2006, it was announced that Tsuchiya and Niimura had divorced. In May 2008, Niimura died of heart failure at the age of 25.

In a 2008 interview in The Japan Times, Tsuchiya said: "It is cool being wild and broken-down, but drinking at nighttime is enough for me. I believe when you make rock music, it might not be cool if you behave not so cleverly. Actually, I've been rather earnest. When I drink a bit, I can get crazy, but not too much. The happiest thing for me is my family."

In September 2009, Tsuchiya wrote on her blog that she was pregnant and had married her long-time stylist, Yamato Kikuchi. The two had begun dating in 2007. On March 26, 2010, Tsuchiya gave birth to her second son, Simba (心羽, Shinba). The couple divorced in 2016.

On March 6, 2017, she gave birth to her third child, a daughter. On November 21, 2018, she had her fourth child, another girl.

== Discography ==
- Taste My Beat (2005)
- Strip Me? (2006)
- Anna Tsuchiya Inspi' Nana (Black Stones) (2007)
- Nudy Show! (2008)
- Rule (2010)

== Filmography ==
=== Film ===
Year	Title	Role	Notes
2003	Kantoku Kennen (監督感染, Director Infection)		Kennen segment
2004	Kamikaze Girls	Ichigo Shirayuri	Leading role Won – Japan Academy Prize for Rookie of the Year; Won – Blue Ribbon Awards Best New Actress; Won – Hochi Film Award Best New Artist; Won – Kinema Junpo Awards Best New Actress; Won – Mainichi Film Award Sponichi Grand Prize New Talent Award; Won – Yokohama Film Festival Best New Talent
2004	The Taste of Tea	Aoi Suzuishi	Won – Blue Ribbon Awards Best New Actress; Won – Hochi Film Award Best New Artist; Won – Kinema Junpo Awards Best New Actress; Won – Mainichi Film Award Sponichi Grand Prize New Talent Award; Won – Yokohama Film Festival Best New Talent
2005	Bashment	Juri Ōmori	Leading role
2005	Arbeit Eye: Hyaku Man-nin no Hyōteki	Monique	
2006	Memories of Matsuko	female prisoner (cameo)	
2007	Dororo	Sabame's wife	
2007	Sakuran	Kiyoha / Higure	Leading role
2008	Paco and the Magical Book	Tamako	
2008	Soreike! Anpanman: Fairy Rinrin's Secret	Rinrin (voice)	
2009	Heaven's Door	Host club customer	
2009	The Legend of Kamui	Ayu	
2015	Gonin Saga	Asami Kikuchi	
2019	Diner	Maria	
2020	Over the Sky	Orika (voice)	
2022	Alivehoon		
2025	Blazing Fists	Kaoruko Akai	
2025	ChaO	Editor-in-chief (voice)	
2026	Chimney Town: Frozen in Time	The Mouse Queen (voice)	

=== Television ===
Year	Title	Role	Notes
2006–07	Nana	Nana Osaki (singing voice)	
2011	Mito Kōmon		Season 43, Ep. 6
2014	S: Saigo no Keikan	Aki Yokokawa	
2020	Followers	Herself	Ep. 1
2023	Sennyu Sosakan Matsushita Kohei	Herself	Ep. 4
2025	Private Banker	Saori Tenguuji	

=== Dubbing roles ===
Year	Title	Role
2005	Herbie: Fully Loaded	Maggie Peyton (Lindsay Lohan)
2012	Battleship	Cora Raikes (Rihanna)
2023	Puss in Boots: The Last Wish	Kitty Softpaws (Salma Hayek)
2023	Haunted Mansion	Harriet (Tiffany Haddish)

== Works ==
=== Photobooks ===
Title	Issue date
White Ice Sherbet	2003-01-20
Anna Banana	2004-07-12
Fleur	2005-01-19
Happy Days – Anna, Mama ni Naru! (アンナ、ママになる!, Anna, Become a Mother!)	2005-12-20
Tsuchiya Anna Photo Album	2007-03-02
An-san Hostess Shuugyouchuu (あんさんホスティス修業中)^{†}	2007-08-03
Anna Tsuchiya 5years	2009-10-30

^{†} This is a compilation of her column at Flyman Postman Press.
