= The Railway Children (band) =

British rock band

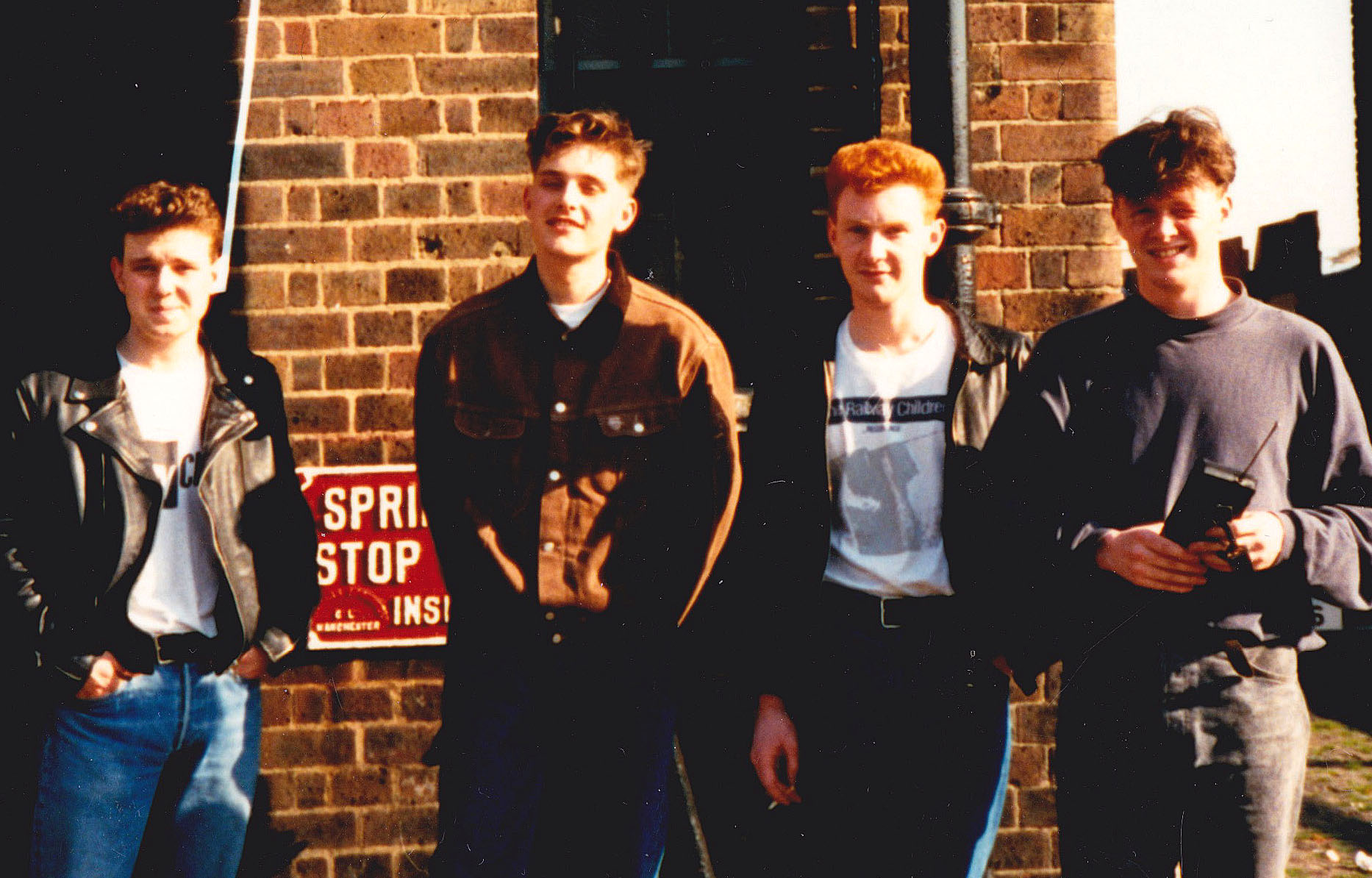

Background information
- Origin: Wigan, England
- Genres: Indie pop, new wave
- Years active: 1984–1991, 1996, 2016–2019
- Labels: Factory, Virgin, Ether
- Past members: Gary Newby; Stephen Hull; Brian Bateman; Guy Keegan

The Railway Children are a British indie band, formed in Wigan in 1984, by Gary Newby (songwriter/vocals/guitar/keyboards), Brian Bateman (rhythm/guitar), Guy Keegan (drums), and Stephen Hull (bass).

== Career ==
Factory Records recorded their debut single "A Gentle Sound" in 1986. This was followed by their first album, Reunion Wilderness in 1987, which topped the UK Indie Chart. They left Factory shortly afterwards and were signed to Virgin Records.

1988 saw the release of their second album, Recurrence, on Virgin Records, and support tours with R.E.M. in Europe (Work Tour) and The Sugarcubes in the US. A national chart hit eluded them with singles "In the Meantime", "Somewhere South" and "Over and Over". The US-only promo "A Pleasure" was a commercial/college rock hit. In 1990, they released Native Place, an album that saw the band take a more pop oriented direction, with keyboard textures coming more to the fore than previously. "Every Beat of the Heart" became a top 40 hit in the UK with a peak at No. 24, and the song became a No. 1 hit on the newly founded Modern Rock Tracks chart in the U.S.

The band parted with Virgin Records in 1992, and broke up soon after. Keegan later had a spell in the Wigan-based folk rock band The Tansads, The Crash Band, and The Ultras, while Hull and Bateman left music for good.

Newby continued solo, and has since released several albums as the Railway Children: Dream Arcade (1997, Ether Records), Gentle Sound (2002, Ether Records) and two collections of rare recordings: Rarities #1 in 2007 and Rarities #2 in 2010; the latter available only by download from his official site. Newby spent several years in Japan from 2002 onwards, writing/arranging music and lyrics for several major Japanese artists, including Anna Tsuchiya, Every Little Thing, V6, Detroit Metal City, Sailor Moon and Yoshikuni Douchin.

In 2016, the original line up of Newby, Keegan, Hull and Bateman decided to get together purely for a series of live dates. They went on to play several times over the following two years, including the NYC Popfest, the Shiiine On Weekender and concerts in Manchester, Berlin and London as well as a hometown gig at the Wigan Diggers Festival. Their final concert was at the Borderline, London in December 2018, after which Hull and Bateman decided to bow out of performing for good.

== Discography ==
=== Studio albums ===
Year	Album	Label	Peak chart positions	
Year	Album	Label	UK Indie	UK
1987	Reunion Wilderness	Factory Records	1	—
1988	Recurrence	Virgin Records	—	96
1990	Native Place	Virgin Records	—	59
1997	Dream Arcade	Ether Records	—	—
2003	Gentle Sound	Ether Records	—	—
"—" denotes releases that did not chart or were not released.

=== Compilation albums ===
- Radio One Evening Sessions (Strange Fruit, 1993)
- Listen On: The Best of the Railway Children (Virgin Records, 1995)
- Gentle Sound (acoustic compilation album) (Ether Records, 2003)
- Rarities 1# (2007) – download only
- Rarities 2# (2010) – download only

=== Singles ===
Year	Title	Peak chart positions		
Year	Title	US Alt.	UK Indie	UK
1986	"A Gentle Sound"	—	6	—
1987	"Brighter"	—	3	—
1988	"In the Meantime"	—	—	95
1988	"Somewhere South"	—	—	—
1988	"Over and Over"	—	—	—
1990	"Every Beat of the Heart"	1	—	24
1990	"Music Stop"	—	—	66
1990	"So Right"	—	—	68
1991	"Something So Good"	—	—	57
2002	"Skinship"	—	—	—
"—" denotes releases that did not chart or were not released.
