= Maximum the Hormone discography =

Japanese nu metal band discography

- Studio albums: 4
- Extended plays: 5
- Singles: 14
- Video albums: 4
- Music videos: 25

Maximum the Hormone (Japanese: マキシマム ザ ホルモン, Hepburn: Makishimamu za Horumon) is a Japanese heavy metal/hardcore punk band from Hachiōji, Tokyo.

== Studio albums ==
Title	Album details	Peak positions	Certifications (sales thresholds)
Title	Album details	JPN	Certifications (sales thresholds)
A.S.A. Crew	Released: 29 August 1999; Label: Sky Records	—	
Rock-impo Goroshi	Released: 2 March 2005; Label: VAP	27	
Bu-ikikaesu	Released: 14 March 2007; Label: VAP	5	JPN: 3× Platinum
Yoshū Fukushū	Released: 31 July 2013; Label: VAP	1	JPN: Platinum
"—" denotes a recording that did not chart.

== Extended plays ==
Title	EP details	Peak positions
Title	EP details	JPN
Hō	Release date: 14 February 2001; Label: Sky Records (Japan)	—
Mimi Kajiru	Released: 23 October 2002; Label: Mimikajiru	—
Kusoban	Released: 21 January 2004; Label: Mimikajiru	72
Mimi Kajiru Shinuchi	Released: 18 November 2015; Label: VAP	—
Korekara no Menkata Cottelee no Hanashi o Shiyou	Released: 28 November 2018; Label: Warner Music Japan	—
"—" denotes a recording that did not chart.

== Singles ==
Title	Year	Peak positions	Sales	Certifications	Album
Title	Year	JPN	Sales	Certifications	Album
"Bullpen Catcher's Dream"	2000	—			Non-album singles
"Niku Cup"	2002	—			Non-album singles
"Enzui Tsuki Waru"	2003	53			Kusoban
"Rock Bankuruwase C/W Minoreba☆Rock"	2004	33			Rock-impo Goroshi
"Hōchō Hasami Cutter Knife Dosu Kiri/Rei Rei Rei Rei Rei Rei Rei Rei Ma Ma Ma Ma Ma Ma Ma Ma"	2004	50			Rock-impo Goroshi
"Zawa...Zawa...Za..Zawa......Zawa"	2005	14			Bu-ikikaesu
"Koi no Mega Lover"	2006	9			Bu-ikikaesu
"Tsume Tsume Tsume/F"	2008	2		JPN: Gold	Yoshū Fukushū
"Greatest the Hits 2011–2011"	2011	1		JPN: Gold	Yoshū Fukushū
"Korekara no Menkata Cottelee no Hanashi o Shiyou!"	2018	—			Non-album singles
"Hungry Pride"	2020	—			Non-album singles
"Kamigami" (TV edit)	2021	—			Non-album singles
"Hawatari Nioku Centi" (TV edit)	2022	—			Non-album singles
"Koi no America"	2023	—			Non-album singles
"Ki・Se・I・Rush"	2024	5	JPN: 31,509		Non-album singles
"—" denotes a recording that did not chart.

== Demo tapes ==
- めっちゃ蒙古斑 (1997)
- A.S.A. Crew (1998)
- 鳳 (1999)

== Video albums ==
Title	Video details	Chart positions	Certifications
Title	Video details	JPN	Certifications
Debu vs. Debu	Released: 15 September 2005; Label: VAP	16	
Deco vs. Deco	Released: 19 March 2008; Label: VAP	2	JPN: Gold
Deka vs. Deka	Release date: 18 November 2015; Label: VAP	1	
Dhurha vs. Dhurha	Released: January 12, 2022; Label: Warner Music Japan		

== Music videos ==
Year	Title	Album
2002	"Abara Bob"	Mimi Kajiru
2003	"Rolling 1000toon"	Rock-impo Goroshi
2003	"Koi no Sweet Kuso Meriken"	Kusoban
2004	"Minoreba Rock"	—
2004	"Rock Bankuruwase"	Rock-impo Goroshi
2005	"Hōchō Hasami Cutter Knife Dosu Kiri"	Rock-impo Goroshi
2005	"Rock-impo Goroshi"	Rock-impo Goroshi
2006	"What's Up, People?!"	Bu-ikikaesu
2006	"Zetsubō Billy"	Bu-ikikaesu
2006	"Koi no Mega Lover"	Bu-ikikaesu
2007	"Bu-ikikaesu!!"	Bu-ikikaesu
2007	"Bikini Sports Ponchin"	Bu-ikikaesu
2008	"Tsume Tsume Tsume"	Yoshu Fukushu
2011	"Chiisana Kimi no Te / Maximum the Hormone"	Yoshu Fukushu
2011	"Utsukushiki Hitobito no Uta"	Yoshu Fukushu
2013	"A.L.I.E.N"	Yoshu Fukushu
2013	"Yoshū Fukushū"	Yoshu Fukushu
2015	"Koi no Sperm"	Yoshu Fukushu
2018	"Haikei VAP-dono"	Korekara no Menkata Cottelee no Hanashi o Shiyou
2018	"Maximum the Hormone II - Korekara no Menkata Cottelee no Hanashi o Shiyou"	Korekara no Menkata Cottelee no Hanashi o Shiyou
2019	"Hungry Pride"	—
2021	"Kyōkatsu (Live)"	Dhurha Vs Dhurha
2021	"Reiwa Strawberry Vibe"	Dhurha Vs Dhurha
2021	"W×H×U×"	Dhurha Vs Dhurha
2023	"Koi no America"	—
2024	"Satsui vs Satsui"	Ki・Se・I・Rush
2024	"Shimi" (feat. Atarashii Gakko!)	Ki・Se・I・Rush
