= Death Note (2006 TV series) =

Japanese anime television series

- Genre: Mystery; Psychological thriller; Supernatural thriller
- Based on: Death Note by Tsugumi Ohba (Note: Author) and Takeshi Obata (Note: Illustrator)
- Developed by: Toshiki Inoue
- Directed by: Tetsurō Araki
- Voices of: Mamoru Miyano; Kappei Yamaguchi; Nakamura Shidō II; Aya Hirano; Noriko Hidaka; Nozomu Sasaki
- Music by: Yoshihisa Hirano; Hideki Taniuchi
- Opening theme: "The World" by Nightmare (#1–19); "What's Up, People?!" by Maximum the Hormone (#20–37)
- Ending theme: "Alumina" by Nightmare (#1–19, Film 1); "Zetsubō Billy" by Maximum the Hormone (#20–36); "Coda – Death Note" by Yoshihisa Hirano (#37); "Light no Engi" by Hideki Taniuchi (Film 2)
- Country of origin: Japan
- Original language: Japanese
- No. of seasons: 1
- No. of episodes: 37 + 2 TV films

Production
- Executive producers: Masahiko Osawa; Suzuko Fujimoto; Mitsuru Ōshima; Hiroshi Hirayama; Kazuhiko Torishima
- Producers: Toshio Nakatani; Manabu Tamura; Masao Maruyama
- Cinematography: Kazuhiro Yamada
- Animator: Madhouse
- Editor: Aya Hida
- Running time: 22 minutes; 130 minutes (Film 1); 93 minutes (Film 2)
- Production companies: Nippon Television; D.N. Dream Partners; VAP; Shueisha; Madhouse

Original release
- Network: Nippon Television
- Release: October 4, 2006 – June 27, 2007
- Release: August 31, 2007 (Film 1)
- Release: August 22, 2008 (Film 2)

Death Note (stylized in all caps) is a Japanese anime television series based on the manga series Death Note, written by Tsugumi Ohba and illustrated by Takeshi Obata. It was directed by Tetsurō Araki at Madhouse and aired in Japan on Nippon Television every Wednesday (with the exception of December 20, 2006, and January 3, 2007) shortly past midnight, from October 4, 2006, to June 27, 2007. The plot of the series primarily revolves around high school student Light Yagami, who decides to rid the world of evil with the help of a supernatural notebook called a Death Note. This book causes the death of anyone whose name is written in it and is passed on to Light by the Shinigami Ryuk after he becomes bored within the Shinigami world.

A two-hour "Director's Cut" compilation television film, titled Death Note: Relight – Visions of a God, aired on Nippon Television two months after the anime series concluded. Although advertised to be the "complete conclusion", the popularity of the series inspired the release of a second TV film, titled Death Note: Relight 2 – L's Successors nearly a year later. These films summarize the first two parts of the series' narrative, but they alter the plot by adding and omitting scenes.

Death Note has been critically acclaimed, and is considered to be one of the best anime series of all time.

== Cast and characters ==
Character	Japanese	English
Light Yagami	Mamoru Miyano	Brad Swaile
L	Kappei Yamaguchi	Alessandro Juliani
Ryuk	Nakamura Shidō II	Brian Drummond
Misa Amane	Aya Hirano	Shannon Chan-Kent
Near	Noriko Hidaka	Cathy Weseluck
Mello	Nozomu Sasaki	David Hurwitz
Teru Mikami	Masaya Matsukaze	Kirby Morrow
Soichiro Yagami	Naoya Uchida	Chris Britton
Touta Matsuda	Ryō Naitō	Vincent Tong
Shuichi Aizawa	Keiji Fujiwara	Trevor Devall
Kanzo Mogi	Kazuya Nakai	John Murphy
Hideki Ide	Hideo Ishikawa	Brian Dobson
Hirokazu Ukita	Hidenobu Kiuchi	Jeremy From
Watari	Kiyoshi Kobayashi	French Tickner
Kiyomi Takada	Masumi Okamura (Part I); Maaya Sakamoto (Part II)	Heather Doerksen
Raye Penbar	Hideo Ishikawa	Michael Adamthwaite
Naomi Misora	Naoko Matsui	Tabitha St. Germain
Kyosuke Higuchi	Issei Futamata	Andrew Kavadas
Rem	Kimiko Saitō	Colleen Wheeler
Sachiko Yagami	Ai Satō	Saffron Henderson
Sayu Yagami	Haruka Kudō	Kelly Metzger (Part I); Kristie Marsden (Part II)

== Production ==
Tetsurō Araki, the director of the anime series, said that he wished to convey aspects that "made the series interesting" instead of simply "focusing on morals or the concept of justice". Toshiki Inoue, the series writer, agreed with Araki and added that, in anime adaptations, there is a lot of importance in highlighting the aspects that are "interesting in the original". He concluded that Light's presence was "the most compelling" aspect; therefore the adaptation chronicles Light's "thoughts and actions as much as possible". Inoue noted that to best incorporate the manga's plot into the anime, he "tweak[ed] the chronology a bit" and incorporated flashbacks that appear after the openings of the episodes; he said this revealed the desired tensions. Araki said that, because in an anime the viewer cannot "turn back pages" in the manner that a manga reader can, the anime staff ensured that the show clarified details. Inoue added that the staff did not want to get involved with every single detail, so the staff selected elements to emphasize. Due to the complexity of the original manga, he described the process as "definitely delicate and a great challenge". Inoue admitted that he placed more instructions and notes in the script than usual. Araki added that because of the importance of otherwise trivial details, this commentary became crucial to the development of the series.

Araki said that when he discovered the Death Note anime project, he "literally begged" to join the production team; when he did join, he insisted that Inoue should write the scripts. Inoue added that, because he enjoyed reading the manga, he wished to use his effort.

== Release ==
The Death Note anime television series, directed by Tetsurō Araki and animated by Madhouse, premiered on Nippon Television on October 4, 2006, and concluded on June 27, 2007, running for a total of 37 episodes. The series aired every Tuesday at 0:56, which is effectively every Wednesday at 12:56 a.m. JST. It was produced by a production committee consisting of Nippon Television, D.N. Dream Partners, VAP, Shueisha and Madhouse. In North America, the series was licensed by Viz Media for American viewers to use "Download-to-Own" and "Download-to-Rent" services while it was still airing in Japan. This release was seen as "significant because it marked the first time a well known Japanese anime property was made legally available in the United States for domestic audiences to download while the title was still airing on Japanese television". The downloadable episodes contained the original Japanese audio and English subtitles, and were made available through IGN's Windows-only Direct2Drive service. DVDs of the series have also been released, containing both an English dubbed audio track, produced by Ocean Productions, and the original Japanese audio track with optional English subtitles. Viz announced at Anime Expo 2007 that the first DVD would be released on November 20, 2007, in both regular and special editions, and also confirmed at San Diego Comic-Con in 2007 that the first 15,000 copies of each DVD would contain collectible figures.

Death Note was originally slated to make its North American television premiere in Canada, as part of YTV's Bionix programming block, on September 7, 2007. However, the show was removed from the schedule at the last minute and the Canadian premiere was pushed back to October 26, 2007, at 10:00 p.m. Thus, it instead premiered in the United States on October 20, 2007, on Cartoon Network's nighttime programming block Adult Swim and reran until January 10, 2010, when the syndication license expired. The last episode premiered on YTV on July 4, 2008, and would later premiere on Adult Swim two days later. The show also streamed online for free on Adult Swim Video, with a new episode available every Saturday afternoon, on the day of its broadcast premiere. On July 26, 2017, Starz announced that they would be offering episodes of the series for their video on demand service starting on August 1 of that same year.

An animated two-hour compilation TV film titled Death Note Relight: Visions of a God (DEATH NOTE リライト・幻視する神, Desu Nōto Riraito: Genshisuru Kami) aired on Nippon Television in Japan on August 31, 2007, at 8:00 p.m. It is a recap which takes place after the series end, where a shinigami approaches Ryuk in the shinigami realm in order to learn more about the human world. Instead, Ryuk tells him of all the events leading up to the final story arc, about Light Yagami and his rival L. Originally, this special was advertised as a retelling told from Ryuk's point of view, but it does not give a different point of view from what was originally told. However, it does contains updated dialogue, as well as a few additional scenes not featured in the original series run.

Nippon Television also aired a second compilation film titled Death Note: Relight: L's Successors (DEATH NOTE リライト2 Lを継ぐ者, Desu Nōto Riraito 2: L o Tsugu Mono) on August 22, 2008. Like the first film, this compilation summarizes the second part of the anime series. Specifically, it recounted the final half of the suspenseful supernatural story, including the investigators Near and Mello's confrontations with the vigilante Kira. This version features more scene additions than the previous film and omits the mafia subplot.

Tropics Entertainment licensed the series in South and Southeast Asia for streaming on its Tropics Anime Asia YouTube Channel, releasing each episode daily from August 1 to September 6, 2026.

== Episodes ==
=== Part I ===
No.	Title	Directed by	Written by	Storyboarded by	Animation directed by	Original release date	American air date
1	"Rebirth"; Transliteration: "Shinsei" (Japanese: 新生)	Tetsurō Araki & Kei Tsunematsu	Toshiki Inoue	Tetsurō Araki	Masaru Kitao & Takahiro Kagami	October 4, 2006	October 21, 2007
On the grounds of his high school, Light Yagami discovers a notebook which claims inside of it to be able to kill anyone whose name and face are known to its owner. He initially dismisses the so-called "Death Note" as a hoax, but, after testing its powers, he discovers that these claims are indeed real. The original owner, a shinigami named Ryuk, approaches Light and explains that the notebook now belongs to him. Since Light is the new owner, he is the only one who can see and hear Ryuk. Ryuk also says that when Light's time to die comes, he'll write Light's name in his personal Death Note. Light decides to use the Death Note's power to rid the world of evil and become the god of a new, peaceful world.
2	"Confrontation"; Transliteration: "Taiketsu" (Japanese: 対決)	Tomohiko Itō	Toshiki Inoue	Junichi Takaoka	Akemi Kobayashi	October 11, 2006	October 28, 2007
As criminals begin dying from inexplicable heart attacks, Interpol convenes to discuss the phenomenon. Unable to explain it, they turn to the world's top-ranked detective, L, whose true identity is a closely guarded secret. L speaks to the Interpol representatives through a computer and an electronic voice, promising them that they are dealing with mass-murder and that he will soon confront the killer, whom the general public has been calling Kira (the Japanese pronunciation of the English word killer). This displeases Light, who had been going to great lengths to keep the Death Note hidden. L tricks Light into revealing that Kira lives in Japan's Kanto region with a television broadcast. A humiliated Light swears to eliminate L.
3	"Dealings"; Transliteration: "Torihiki" (Japanese: 取引)	Hiroyuki Tsuchiya	Toshiki Inoue	Sato Shinji	Mariko Aoki	October 18, 2006	November 4, 2007
Police authorities discuss the "Kira case" with L. Upon inquiring about the time of death of the victims, L concludes that Kira is likely a student with a naive concept of justice. He requests data on how the victims were publicized and begins to suspect that Kira has access to police information. Because the police officer in charge of the Kira case, Soichiro Yagami, is Light's father, Light can monitor the authorities' movements. Meanwhile, Ryuk tells Light that he is being followed. He also explains that shinigami get the lifespans of people they have taken before their time, and their eyes can see everyone's name and lifespan floating above their heads. He gives Light the option to trade half his remaining lifespan for the eyes of a shinigami, just like Ryuk's.
4	"Pursuit"; Transliteration: "Tsuiseki" (Japanese: 追跡)	Naoyasu Hanyū	Toshiki Inoue	Takashi Anno	Shinichi Miyamae	October 25, 2006	November 11, 2007
Light tells Ryuk that he is trying to create an ideal world where no criminals are left unpunished, and that as the god of such a world, he cannot sacrifice half of his life for the shinigami eyes. Light begins experimenting to find out how much control he has over how a criminal dies. Using this knowledge, Light devises a plan to find out who has been following him. He makes a drug dealer hijack a bus on which Light, and by extension, his follower, are passengers. During the hijacking, Light manipulates his tracker to reveal that he is Raye Penber, a Federal Agent from the United States employed by L and his associate Watari. During the ordeal, Light tricks the hijacker into touching a page that was torn from the Death Note, allowing the hijacker to see Ryuk. The hijacker opens fire on Ryuk; Penber believes the hijacker is hallucinating and attempts to subdue him.
5	"Tactics"; Transliteration: "Kakehiki" (Japanese: 駆引)	Mitsuhiro Yoneda	Toshiki Inoue	Mitsuhiro Yoneda	Kōsuke Murayama, Takehiro Hamatsu & Hideto Komori	November 1, 2006	November 18, 2007
One week later, Light follows Penber onto a train. He forces him to write down the names of his fellow agents on a piece of the Death Note by threatening Raye's family, then kills Raye. Because of the simultaneous death of these twelve FBI agents in Japan, the police are scared to continue investigating, and the President of the United States pulls the FBI off the Kira case. The Japanese police, who were previously unaware that there were FBI agents in Japan, conclude that L hired them to investigate the Japanese police and their families, causing them to distrust L. Soichiro announces that because of the heightened stakes of the case, any officer who no longer wishes to investigate Kira may leave, and will not be demoted for doing so. Only five officers decide to remain on the case. In an effort to repair his relations with the Japanese police, L meets in secret with the remaining detectives who want to work on the Kira case.
6	"Unraveling"; Transliteration: "Hokorobi" (Japanese: 綻び)	Oyunamu	Yasuko Kobayashi	Masato Bessho	Dong Seok Kim	November 8, 2006	November 25, 2007
In his meeting with the detectives, L reveals his thoughts about how Kira might be following the murders of the FBI agents and pinpoints who the federal agents were tracking during that period. Raye's widow, Naomi Misora, approaches Light about her husband's death. He offers to let her join the investigation as long as she tells him her name.
7	"Overcast"; Transliteration: "Donten" (Japanese: 曇天)	Tomohiko Itō	Shōji Yonemura	Toshio Hirata	Junichi Takaoka	November 15, 2006	December 2, 2007
Light writes Naomi's name on the Death Note. Just before the Death Note takes effect, Light informs her that he is Kira. Meanwhile, Watari reveals his identity in the meeting with Light's father and the other detectives. He gives the detectives special gadgets embedded in clothing in the event Kira comes into contact with them or they are in trouble. Detective Shuichi Aizawa is sent to the police headquarters by L.
8	"Glare"; Transliteration: "Mesen" (Japanese: 目線)	Masato Bessho	Toshiki Inoue	Masato Bessho	Akemi Kobayashi	November 22, 2006	December 9, 2007
L is close to discovering the identity of Kira. He requests surveillance equipment to be installed in the homes of those he suspects, including Soichiro Yagami's son. Light, however, becomes aware that he is being watched and has Ryuk locate all the cameras in his room. He deceives the surveillance team by watching the news on a portable television hidden in a bag of potato chips and continues to kill the criminals being reported. The next day, he discards the television by mixing it with the trash.
9	"Encounter"; Transliteration: "Sesshoku" (Japanese: 接触)	Yukio Okazaki	Toshiki Inoue	Michio Fukuda	Takashi Saijō	November 29, 2006	December 16, 2007
L's suspicions are momentarily subdued, but he does not discard the possibility that Light may be Kira and decides to meet him in person. At the college entrance exams, Light notices a mysterious and eccentric student staring at him, who introduces himself as Hideki Ryuga, the same name as a famous idol. Light is shocked when "Hideki Ryuga" reveals himself as L. Since Light risks either killing the real Ryuga by accident or arousing suspicion by having L die right after meeting Light, he decides to befriend L, gather more information about his true identity, and kill him at a later time.
10	"Doubt"; Transliteration: "Giwaku" (Japanese: 疑惑)	Shinji Osamura	Toshiki Inoue	Junichi Takaoka	Yūki Kinoshita	December 6, 2006	December 23, 2007
In a bid to profile Light's behavior, L challenges him to a game of tennis. L asks him some questions regarding the Kira case and invites him to help in the investigation. The two then receive news that Soichiro Yagami has had a heart attack and is in the hospital. Light promises to his father that he will make sure Kira is caught and executed for making him suffer. On the way out, L confronts and scrutinizes Light, still uncertain whether or not he is Kira. Light attempts a bluff and demands to be placed in a prison cell without television for one month to prove his innocence. L is satisfied but curious that Light should offer this proposition. Meanwhile, the television station Sakura TV receives audio tapes from an anonymous person claiming to be Kira.
11	"Assault"; Transliteration: "Totsunyū" (Japanese: 突入)	Naoyasu Hanyū	Shōji Yonemura	Makoto Matsuo	Shinichi Miyamae	December 13, 2006	January 5, 2008
Sakura TV is forced to broadcast several prerecorded audio messages allegedly from Kira. L determines the messages are trying to gain public support for Kira and must be stopped, but the investigation team are unable to contact the station directly. Hirokazu Ukita, one of the investigators working with L, rushes to Sakura TV but mysteriously dies in front of the station, along with two police officers. The investigation team believes that Kira no longer needs to know the person's name to kill, while L suspects this may be a new, different Kira. Soichiro Yagami, hearing news of the broadcasts, hijacks a bus, crashes into the Sakura TV lobby, and seizes the tapes. A young girl named Misa Amane discusses her admiration for Kira with a shinigami named Rem, and reveals that she has made the trade for shinigami eyes.
12	"Love"; Transliteration: "Koigokoro" (Japanese: 恋心)	Hiroyuki Tsuchiya	Toshiki Inoue	Takashi Anno	Mariko Aoki	December 27, 2006	January 12, 2008
Light meets with L and the detectives. To test Light's analytical skills, L has him listen to the recordings confiscated by the team to determine if there are any clues in the reader's voice. In this way, L concludes that Light cannot be Kira. The team then broadcasts a recording made by L and Light to trick the second Kira into replying. Shocked and wanting to pursue this lead, the investigation team formulates a plan, while Light decides what to do.
13	"Confession"; Transliteration: "Kokuhaku" (Japanese: 告白)	Mitsuhiro Yoneda	Toshiki Inoue	Michio Fukuda	Kōsuke Murayama, Yoshitsugu Hatano, Takehiro Hamatsu & Atsushi Aono	January 10, 2007	January 19, 2008
Detective Touta Matsuda and Light volunteer to go to Aoyama to investigate on the date mentioned in the journal entry. Light intends to find out who the second Kira is, and in order to keep his identity unknown to the shinigami following Misa, he gets a group of his friends to surround them while they walk. With her shinigami eyes, however, Misa learns that Light is Kira because, as a Death Note holder, his life span is the only one she can't see. Later, Misa confirms to the investigation team that she has found the real Kira. The team decides to change their approach and try to reason with her. They release a television broadcast condemning Kira as a heartless murderer who will kill anyone who discovers his identity. Furthermore, they offer to lessen the severity of the punishment the second Kira will face if she reveals information about the real Kira. Misa ignores this, finds Light and explains that she tracked him down because she loves him.
14	"Friend"; Transliteration: "Tomodachi" (Japanese: 友達)	Tomohiko Itō	Shōji Yonemura	Tomohiko Itō	Junichi Takaoka	January 17, 2007	January 26, 2008
After Light introduces Misa to Ryuk, the two Kiras discuss their plans to get rid of L. Taking advantage of the situation and of Misa's love for him, Light concludes that he can use her to mislead L while furthering his plans for a better world, then dispose of her when he no longer has a need for her. Rem, however, threatens to write down Light's name in her own Death Note if Misa's safety is compromised. In the meantime, L is thrown off the trail by the second Kira and is confused by the new audio tapes purposely denouncing the police's attempt to make the first Kira appear as a pariah. L concludes that the two Kiras might have met and are working towards the same goal. In response to Rem's threat against his own life, Light uses her emotions toward Misa to convince her to move forward with a plan by which she will write down L's name in her own Death Note instead.
15	"Wager"; Transliteration: "Kake" (Japanese: 賭け)	Oyunamu	Yasuko Kobayashi	Takashi Anno	Jang Kil Yong	January 24, 2007	February 2, 2008
Worried at the prospect that he might be murdered, as he is convinced the two Kiras have met, L demands that in the event of his death, Light should be arrested. Later, Light and L meet each other outside college. Much to the anger and frustration of Light, Misa appears and converses with the two. Minutes after Misa leaves, Light receives the news from L that she has been arrested on grounds of being the second Kira. Misa appears to be blindfolded and tied to a chair, while L instructs Watari to torture her to obtain information. A few days later, Misa relinquishes ownership of her Death Note, thus erasing her memories of its existence.
16	"Decision"; Transliteration: "Ketsudan" (Japanese: 決断)	Masato Bessho	Toshiki Inoue	Toshio Hirata	Dong Jun Kim	January 31, 2007	February 10, 2008
Light decides to tell L that he thinks that he may be Kira subconsciously and wishes to be confined. Light's father also believes it is a good idea that he himself be confined to a cell as he cannot risk his emotions getting the better of him in this investigation. Light concocts a plan whereby he tells Ryuk he will relinquish ownership of the Death Note at any time in a discreet discussion, while being monitored by L. After Light's imprisonment, Kira's executions stop and L's suspicion is heightened. Light chooses this time to give up the Death Note, losing his memories of being Kira. His change in behavior puzzles L; Light goes from being calm to completely desperate. The Kira executions then resume and the new spate of killings confuses L.
17	"Execution"; Transliteration: "Shikkō" (Japanese: 執行)	Ryōsuke Nakamura	Toshiki Inoue	Ryōsuke Nakamura	Akemi Kobayashi	February 7, 2007	February 17, 2008
In a last bid to determine if Light and Misa are the two Kiras, L and Soichiro stage a stunt in which Light's father attempts to kill Light and then himself out of shame. Seeing Light and Misa's reactions to it, L intervenes and announces that he no longer suspects them of being Kira, although he is still suspicious over the fact that Misa's DNA was found on the audio tapes. Misa is released, but Light continues working on the Kira case. L and Watari move the investigation team's headquarters to a new building inside the city. Elsewhere, Rem speaks to a mysterious businessman about the Death Note. Eight businessmen then plan the next murder Kira will commit.
18	"Ally"; Transliteration: "Nakama" (Japanese: 仲間)	Shinji Osamura	Shōji Yonemura	Shinsaku Sasaki	Masaki Hinata	February 14, 2007	February 24, 2008
L proposes that he be tied to Light, causing a scuffle to break out in the new headquarters. It is some time until Kira begins killing again, which has L and Light thinking that Kira may be killing for monetary profit. Their investigation leads them to the Yotsuba Group, a rich organization that dominates global markets. Kira is also reported to have been sending threats to politicians and the investigation team is forced to conduct their operations in secret. Aizawa quits the Task Force, angry at L for testing his loyalty, although he feels conflicted about his decision. L brings two new members to the investigation team, Aiber and Wedy.
19	"Matsuda" (Japanese: 松田)	Eiko Nishi	Yasuko Kobayashi	Michio Fukuda	Shinichi Miyamae	February 21, 2007	March 2, 2008
Feeling inferior at his lack of participation in the Kira case, Matsuda decides to snoop around the Yotsuba Group and do his own research. He finds evidence that Kira is in the building, but is apprehended by the eight businessmen before he can act. Using the fake identity card Watari gave him, he passes himself off as Misa's manager. He pretends to offer a deal involving her in their commercial campaign, while contacting L using his modified belt buckle. Following L's instructions, he then fakes his own death in front of the eight Yotsuba Group executives by jumping off the balcony. In one of the Group's later meetings, one of its members chooses to leave out of fear he may have to face the consequences of Kira's actions.
20	"Makeshift"; Transliteration: "Kosoku" (Japanese: 姑息)	Hiroyuki Tsuchiya	Toshiki Inoue	Kiyoko Sayama	Mariko Aoki	February 28, 2007	March 9, 2008
The investigation team installs wiretaps and surveillance cameras to monitor the Yotsuba Group meetings and are amazed at how openly they discuss their use of Kira. Light and L come up with a plan to contact one of the members of the Group, Reiji Namikawa. Namikawa agrees to act as a spy and help postpone Kira's killings by discussing them at the meetings. L reveals that he still suspects Light is the first Kira by playing mind games with him. Afterward, L questions Misa and wants her to infiltrate the Yotsuba Group to obtain information. Soichiro worries that even if they do gather enough information on the Group it will be difficult to capture all of its members at the same time.
21	"Performance"; Transliteration: "Katsuyaku" (Japanese: 活躍)	Mitsuhiro Yoneda	Toshiki Inoue	Mitsuhiro Yoneda & Tetsurō Araki	Takehiro Hamatsu, Atsushi Aono & Terumi Nishii	March 7, 2007	March 16, 2008
The third Kira sets his eyes on Misa after meeting her. While Misa is taking a break from meeting with the Yotsuba Group, Rem contacts her. Misa is able to see the shinigami, but her memories of being the second Kira do not return upon touching a portion of the Death Note that Rem has brought her. Rem then tells Misa about everything that has happened and that she must trust Light lest she be killed. Upon re-entering the room, she spots who the third Kira must be: Kyosuke Higuchi. Misa goes on a date with him and is able to obtain proof that Higuchi is the criminal L is looking for. Her ease in determining who Kira is leaves L very suspicious, since he could not deduce it himself.
22	"Guidance"; Transliteration: "Yūdō" (Japanese: 誘導)	Naoto Hashimoto	Toshiki Inoue	Sayo Yamamoto	Akemi Kobayashi	March 14, 2007	March 23, 2008
After learning that Higuchi is Kira, L decides that the police must not apprehend him until they understand his killing method. He arranges for Sakura TV to air a "Kira special" where Matsuda will declare he knows the identity of Kira to lure out Higuchi. Having been granted immunity from prosecution, several of the businessmen trick Higuchi and lead him to follow L's plan. As Higuchi races to the television station, determined to kill the whistleblower, L and the investigation team watch his every move via cameras and wiretaps.
23	"Frenzy"; Transliteration: "Kyōsō" (Japanese: 狂騒)	Tomohiko Itō	Shōji Yonemura	Yuzo Sato	Mamoru Yokota & Junichi Takaoka	March 21, 2007	March 30, 2008
While driving to Sakura TV, Higuchi talks with Rem about his situation. L, Light and Misa watch from the investigation team building and wonder who he is talking to. L wonders if Higuchi is talking to a shinigami. Higuchi enters the station's offices and writes Matsuda's fake name in his Death Note. The team thinks he has just written a note to himself, but find his subsequent erratic behavior odd. L argues that Higuchi has attempted to use his killing method. Higuchi then makes the deal with Rem to obtain shinigami eyes. A furious pursuit ensues when L realizes Higuchi can kill after looking at a person's face and orders the police to apprehend him. Aizawa and Ide return, leading a squad of police cars to block Higuchi's path. After this, Aizawa rejoins the Task Force.
24	"Revival"; Transliteration: "Fukkatsu" (Japanese: 復活)	Hisato Shimoda	Shōji Yonemura	Minoru Ohara	Masaki Hinata	March 28, 2007	April 6, 2008
Higuchi is arrested on grounds of being Kira and causing multiple murders in the region of Kanto. After inspecting Higuchi's Death Note, L discovers that shinigami do exist. While L is stunned, Light takes the Death Note from him and remembers that he is the original Kira. Light then kills Higuchi by writing his name on a hidden scrap of the Death Note. The investigation team reviews the rules written in the book and sees two fake rules Light added: after writing a name, the owner must continue writing names every 13 days or perish; and if the Death note is destroyed, all those who have touched it will die. They conclude that Light must be innocent and they must not destroy the book. Meanwhile, Light orders Misa to recover the other Death Note he had hidden a few months earlier. Having lost her shinigami eyes when she relinquished her Death Note, Misa makes another deal with Ryuk in order to find out L's true identity.
25	"Silence"; Transliteration: "Chinmoku" (Japanese: 沈黙)	Mitsuyuki Masuhara	Toshiki Inoue	Tetsurō Araki	Takahiro Kagami & Hideki Inoue	April 4, 2007	April 13, 2008
L asks Rem about Death Notes; she reveals as little information as possible to avoid implicating Light or Misa. Meanwhile, Misa begins to use her Death Note to kill criminals. Although Light denies Misa's involvement, L becomes very suspicious of her and Rem realizes that it was Light's plan all along to endanger Misa so that Rem would sacrifice herself to kill L. Later, Light finds L on the roof of the investigation team headquarters. The latter laments how distant he is from other people and how often they, like most people, lie. When the two rejoin the rest of the team, L reveals that he is planning on testing the thirteen-day rule, the only thing currently absolving Misa. Before he can do so, however, Rem kills Watari and L at the cost of her own life. After secretly snatching away Rem's Death Note, Light celebrates his victory in silence.
26	"Renewal"; Transliteration: "Saisei" (Japanese: 再生)	Tomohiko Itō	Tomohiko Itō	Tomohiko Itō	Mamoru Yokota	April 11, 2007	April 20, 2008
The first half of the episode features L narrating the events of the first 25 episodes. The account of the Kira case is revealed to have been left behind by L as a record of his achievements as a detective. It is deleted by Light when he discovers it. The investigation team appoints Light as L's successor and agrees to not publicly announce L's death. Light resumes his executions with a vengeance, killing Aiber, Wedy, and the remaining Yotsuba group. The show jumps ahead in time five years, depicting Light joining the National Police Agency (NPA) of Japan in 2012, at the age of 23. Five years earlier, shortly after L's death, L's computer is shown automatically notifying an elderly man of L's fate. The man then reveals this information to two children.

=== Part II ===
No.	Title	Directed by	Written by	Storyboarded by	Animation directed by	Original release date	American air date
27	"Abduction"; Transliteration: "Yūkai" (Japanese: 誘拐)	Tomio Yamauchi	Toshiki Inoue	Kiyoko Sayama	Hirotaka Marufuji & Mamoru Yokota	April 18, 2007	April 27, 2008
Orphanage caretaker Roger Ruvie informs L's successors, Mello and Near, that L has died. Relinquishing the opportunity to succeed L, Mello leaves the orphanage to pursue Kira on his own, backed by the American Mafia. Near allies himself with US President David Hoope. Along with Steve Mason of the FBI, he forms an organization whose goal is to catch Kira, the Special Provision for Kira (SPK). Aizawa informs Soichiro that the director of the NPA has been kidnapped (unbeknownst to them, by Mello) and demanded the Death Note in the Japanese task force's possession as ransom. As soon as Light discovers this, he kills the director. Mello then decides to kidnap Light's sister, Sayu. While scrambling to find a way to rescue Sayu, the investigation team contacts SPK for help in solving the case of kidnapping. Near reveals that he knows of L's death and that someone has attempted to replace him.
28	"Impatience"; Transliteration: "Shōsō" (Japanese: 焦燥)	Eiko Nishi	Toshiki Inoue	Michio Fukuda	Shinichi Miyamae	April 25, 2007	May 4, 2008
Near suggests that he and Light cooperate to rescue Sayu. Soichiro takes the Death Note to the exchange point chosen by the kidnappers in Los Angeles, but Mello's men hijack the plane he is on and drop him off in the middle of the desert. Light monitors his father via satellite, until he enters an underground facility. There, Soichiro exchanges the Death Note for Sayu. Mello slaughters most of the SPK once he obtains the Death Note. Near then proposes to Light that the two cooperate completely in the future, and shares his suspicions that Mello is playing a game to see who can catch Kira faster. Meanwhile, in the shinigami realm, a shinigami named Sidoh tells another, Armonia Justin, that he lost his Death Note. Armonia Justin informs Sidoh that it was stolen by Ryuk and dropped in the human world.
29	"Father"; Transliteration: "Chichioya" (Japanese: 父親)	Tomohiko Itō	Toshiki Inoue	Shinsaku Sasaki	Shinichi Yokota & Junichi Takaoka	May 2, 2007	May 11, 2008
Light uses the Death Note to have a member of Mello's Mafia mail him the address of their hideout. Sidoh sees the address and goes to find Mello, revealing to him that the 13-day rule is fake. Meanwhile, Light informs Ryuk that he will give up ownership of his Death Note and borrow Misa's. The next day, Misa, posing as Kira, calls the investigation team to tell them that she will give them her Death Note. She also tells them that most of the members of Mello's mafia will die on November 10 and that will be the best time to find the stolen Death Note. Upon receiving the second Death Note, Soichiro makes the deal with Ryuk to obtain shinigami eyes. The investigation team storms Mello's facility on the set date. Soichiro comes face to face with Mello and reads his true name: Mihael Keehl. Before he can write it on the recently recovered Death Note, however, Soichiro is shot. Mello escapes by detonating explosives and Soichiro is taken to a hospital, where he dies comforted by the belief that his son cannot be Kira because he can see Light's lifespan. Light returns Sidoh's lost Death Note to him.
30	"Justice"; Transliteration: "Seigi" (Japanese: 正義)	Hideki Itō	Shōji Yonemura	Ryosuke Nakamura	Hideki Itō	May 9, 2007	May 18, 2008
The President of the United States declares America's neutrality regarding Kira in Sakura TV's program Kira's Kingdom. Meanwhile, a scarred Mello uses SPK agent Halle Lidner as hostage to gain entrance into Near's headquarters and meet with him. Mello demands the picture Near has of him so that he will remain safe from Kira. In return, he tells Near about shinigami and that some of the Death Note's rules are fake. Already suspicious of Light, Near proposes to the investigation team that they test the "thirteen-day" rule, but none of them believe that they should. In response, Light contacts the President of the United States, asking for information on the whereabouts of the SPK and threatening to kill him if he does not cooperate. Aizawa, who has started to suspect Light, considers informing Near. Later, Hitoshi Demegawa, the host of Sakura TV's show, goes to America as Kira's messenger and gives a worldwide broadcast inciting people to break into the newly found headquarters of the supposedly evil SPK.
31	"Transfer"; Transliteration: "Ijō" (Japanese: 移譲)	Hisato Shimoda	Yasuko Kobayashi	Toru Takahashi	Akemi Kobayashi & Terumi Nishii	May 16, 2007	May 25, 2008
Demegawa commands Kira's followers to break into the SPK headquarters in New York, while Misa watches the scene on television, waiting to kill Near as soon as he exits the building. Near asks the Japanese investigation team to consider that Light may be Kira. He and the remaining SPK members then escape the building by dropping buckets of money out of the windows to distract the protesters. Aware that his team is beginning to doubt his identity, Light e-mails Misa with a new plan. Aizawa offers Near information about the past investigation that leads him to conclude that Light is Kira. Aizawa then tells Light that he would like to resume surveillance on Misa and him to help clear their names, to which Light agrees. Demegawa appears on television soon after, asking Kira's followers to donate money to build a temple to worship Kira. Disgusted, Light has Teru Mikami, the new owner of Misa's Death Note whom Light selected based on his appearances in Kira's Kingdom, kill Demegawa. Back at the investigation team headquarters, Aizawa realizes that with both Light and Misa under observation, the new killings cannot be attributed to either of them.
32	"Selection"; Transliteration: "Sentaku" (Japanese: 選択)	Hironobu Aoyagi	Yasuko Kobayashi	Kiyoko Sayama	Masaki Hinata	May 23, 2007	June 1, 2008
Tragic events in Teru Mikami's childhood convince him that God wants him to stand up to evil. As a result, when criminals everywhere begin to die, Mikami believes that this is God's righteous judgment and becomes a frequent guest on Kira's Kingdom. After Light gives him a Death Note, Mikami becomes ecstatic and passes judgment on criminals in Light's stead. He chooses a new spokesperson for Kira: Kiyomi Takada, who happens to be one of Light's girlfriends in college. Light realizes that he can use this connection to his advantage and sets up a meeting with Takada, ostensibly for the benefit of the investigation. While the two meet, Takada receives a call from Mikami and Light reveals himself to Mikami as Kira. They create a ploy to force the investigation team to remove all bugs from the room, after which Light tells Takada that he wants her to be his goddess in the new world. Light then tells the investigation team that he will pretend to be Takada's boyfriend to catch Kira. Elsewhere, Mello watches Misa, suspecting her of being the second Kira.
33	"Scorn"; Transliteration: "Chōshō" (Japanese: 嘲笑)	Tetsuhito Saitō	Shōji Yonemura	Kiyoko Sayama	Shin Jae Ick	May 30, 2007	June 8, 2008
Near goes to Japan, allegedly as bait for Kira, and ponders on how to beat Light, knowing that the one who is doing his will has shinigami eyes and that the two communicate via Takada. Following Light's instructions, Takada asks Mikami to send her five pages of the Death Note. She tells him that he will continue his work in a fake book made to look like the real one. While walking to a broadcast, Misa runs into Takada and rushes her, jealous that she is not the more popular star. Halle Lidner, who has been sent by Near to act as Takada's bodyguard, stops her, but Takada meets with Misa soon after, with Lidner sitting in with them. By the end of the conversation, Takada is convinced that Misa is stupid and Lidner reports to Near about the love triangle between Light, Takada and Misa. Elsewhere, SPK member Stephen Gevanni confirms that Mikami is the new Kira, after watching him kill a man by writing something in a notebook.
34	"Vigilance"; Transliteration: "Koshi" (Japanese: 虎視)	Eiko Nishi	Shōji Yonemura	Minoru Ohara	Shinichi Miyamae	June 6, 2007	June 15, 2008
After Gevanni's report, Near decides that they must get close to Mikami discreetly, so that the shinigami trailing Mikami will not warn him. Meanwhile, Aizawa marks several notepads before Light and Takada meet, to determine whether or not they are communicating in secret through written notes. Takada tells Light of her meeting with Misa. Annoyed at the trouble that both women cause him, Light assures her that she is the only one for him. He then writes a script for Takada that makes it sound like she has agreed to help capture Kira. After the meeting, Aizawa's suspicions are confirmed. The SPK picks up Misa then and, when Light contacts Near to tell him that they have lost track of her, Near informs him that he has her. Meanwhile, Gevanni searches Mikami's gym locker and finds the notebook. During a second visit, Gevanni takes photographs of the names written in it. Near determines that the handwriting is Mikami's. Now having everything he needs, Near sets his plan in motion.
35	"Malice"; Transliteration: "Satsui" (Japanese: 殺意)	Tomohiko Itō	Toshiki Inoue	Tomohiko Itō	Shinichi Yokota & Junichi Takaoka	June 13, 2007	June 22, 2008
Mello, with the help of his accomplice Matt, kidnaps Takada in a daring operation, getting in the way of both Near and Light's plans to set up a meeting between the SPK and the investigation team. Matt is shot by Takada's bodyguards and Takada, prepared to face such an event, kills Mello by writing his name in a piece of the Death Note she managed to hide away. Once Light hears about this, he uses a piece of his Death Note to make her commit suicide by setting fire to everything around her, including all evidence.
36	"1.28"	Takayuki Hirao	Toshiki Inoue	Kiyoko Sayama	Takuro Takahashi	June 20, 2007	June 29, 2008
Each having developed a strategy to bring the other down for good, Light and Near finally meet face to face in an abandoned warehouse. Light brings out Mikami to have him write the names of everyone but Light on his Death Note. Meanwhile, Near is confident that the pages of the notebook Mikami is using are fake, revealing that he has tampered with them. All they need to do now is check whose name was not written to find out who the real Kira is. Light struggles to mask his glee as he thinks of how he already knew of Near's actions and that that had been why he had Takada keep the real Death Note while switching Mikami's with a false one. As the seconds before the Death Note's power takes effect count down, Light declares his victory to Near.
37	"New World"; Transliteration: "Shin Sekai" (Japanese: 新世界)	Tetsurō Araki	Toshiki Inoue	Tetsurō Araki	Takahiro Kagami & Terumi Nishii	June 27, 2007	July 6, 2008
Mikami's Death Note fails to work. Near reveals that he knew about the fake notebook and had actually tampered with the real one. Mikami is restrained and, faced with Near's undeniable evidence, Light confesses that he is Kira. In a desperate last ditch attempt, he begins to write Near’s name on a piece of the Death Note hidden in his watch, but Matsuda stops him by shooting him several times. Seeing Light writhe on the floor in agony, Mikami kills himself, causing a commotion that allows Light to flee the warehouse. However, Light's wounds do not allow him to travel far and Ryuk, reasoning that Light will offer him no further entertainment in defeat, writes down Light's name in his Death Note, just as he promised when they first met. Light dies of a heart attack, seeing L's figure in front of him.

== Relight TV films ==
No.	Title	Directed by	Written by	Storyboarded by	Animation directed by	Original release date	American release date
1	"Director's Cut Complete Conclusion Relight: Visions of a God"; Transliteration: "Direkutāzu Katto Kanzen Ketchaku – Riraito: Genshisuru Kami" (Japanese: ディレクターズカット完全決着版 〜リライト・幻視する神〜)	Tetsurō Araki	Toshiki Inoue, Shōji Yonemura & Yasuko Kobayashi	Tetsurō Araki	Masaru Kitao	August 31, 2007	June 23, 2009
A nameless new shinigami, interested in visiting the human world, visits Ryuk sometime after Kira case has concluded. Receiving an apple from the former, Ryuk agrees to tell Light's story, but stops at Light's victory over L. The film concludes with the shinigami leaving and setting his sights on the human realm, as Ryuk says, "If you're lucky, some unbelievable guy might just pick up your notebook. Maybe you'll get to see something you'll never forget for the rest of your life. That's what I think. Wouldn't you agree, Light?"
2	"Relight 2: L's Successors"; Transliteration: "Riraito 2: Eru o Tsugu Mono" (Japanese: リライト2 Lを継ぐ者)	Hideki Inoue	Toshiki Inoue, Tetsurō Araki, Shōji Yonemura & Yasuko Kobayashi	Tetsurō Araki & Hideki Inoue	Masaru Kitao	August 22, 2008	October 27, 2009
The special summarizes episodes 27–37 of the anime by omitting most of Mello's involvement in the Kira case. Unlike its predecessor, the film merely uses a condensed version of the final episode as its ending, followed by an added scene of Aizawa and Matsuda finding Light's body. There is also a scene showing Ryuk leaving the human realm.

== Home media release ==
=== Japanese ===
VAP (Japan, Region 2/A)
Volume / Title	Discs	Episodes	Release date
1	1	1–3	December 21, 2006
2	1	4–6	January 24, 2007
3	1	7–9	February 21, 2007
4	1	10–12	March 21, 2007
5	1	13–15	April 25, 2007
6	1	16–18	May 23, 2007
7	1	19–21	June 27, 2007
8	1	22–24	July 25, 2007
9	1	25–27	August 22, 2007
10	1	28–30	September 27, 2007
11	1	31–33	October 24, 2007
12	1	34–35	November 21, 2007
13	1	36–37	December 21, 2007
Relight	1	TV film 1	March 19, 2008
Relight 2	1	TV film 2	November 21, 2008
Blu-ray Box	7	1–37	October 19, 2016

=== English ===
Viz Media (North America, Region 1/A)
Volume / Title	Discs	Episodes	Release date
1	1	1–4	November 20, 2007
2	1	5–8	December 18, 2007
3	1	9–12	February 19, 2008
4	1	13–16	April 29, 2008
5	1	17–20	June 24, 2008
6	1	21–24	August 26, 2008
7	1	25–28	October 28, 2008
8	1	29–32	December 30, 2008
9	1	33–37	February 24, 2009
Box Set 1	5	1–20	November 18, 2008
Box Set 2	5	21–37	April 14, 2009
Relight	1	TV film 1	June 23, 2009
Relight 2	1	TV film 2	October 27, 2009
The Complete Series	10	1–37 + 2 TV films	November 18, 2014

== Music ==
Five pieces of theme music are used for the series. The first opening theme, titled "The World", is performed by Nightmare. Nightmare also performed the first ending theme, "Alumina" (アルミナ, Arumina), which reappears as the ending theme in the television film Death Note: Relight: Visions of a God and as an insert in episodes 12 and 19. Both songs appear on their album The World Ruler. The second opening theme from episode 20 onwards is "What's Up, People?!" and the second ending theme is "Zetsubō Billy" (絶望ビリー, Zetsubō Birī; "Desperate Billy"), which also appears as an insert in the TV special Death Note: Relight: Visions of a God. Both themes are performed by Maximum the Hormone and appear on their album Bu-ikikaesu. The final episode's ending theme is "Coda – Death Note" by series co-composer Yoshihisa Hirano. "Misa's Song", performed by Misa's voice actress Aya Hirano, is heard as an insert for episode 25. The English version of the song is performed by the character's English voice actress, Shannon Chan-Kent.

Several soundtracks for the series have been released. The music from the anime was composed by Yoshihisa Hirano and Hideki Taniuchi, while the CDs were also published by VAP. The first one was Death Note Original Soundtrack, which was released in Japan on December 21, 2006. It contains music from the series with the first opening and ending themes are sung by the Japanese band Nightmare in the TV size format. Death Note Original Soundtrack II was first released in Japan on March 21, 2007. It features the new opening and closing themes by Maximum the Hormone in the TV size format. The third CD, Death Note Original Soundtrack III was released on June 27, 2007. Tracks 1–21 were composed and arranged by Taniuchi, while tracks 22–28 were composed and arranged by Hirano. The album features one track sung by Aya Hirano, who was also the Japanese voice actress of Misa Amane in the anime series. Also appearing on this soundtrack is the ending theme Coda – Death Note, which can be heard at the end of the final episode of the anime as the credits are shown.

== Reception ==
On the review aggregator website Rotten Tomatoes, 100% of 14 critics' reviews are positive, with an average rating of 8.5/10. The website's consensus reads: "Death Note is an exceptional anime that poses profound questions about justice and murder, all while delivering a supremely satisfying tale of tactical one-upmanship between a detective and killer."

The anime was commended by Tom S. Pepirium of IGN, who said that Death Note's "heavy serialized nature" is what "makes the show so engaging and discussion worthy". Pepirium, saying that translating Death Note is "no small task", stated that Stephen Hedley created an English dub with "nothing clunky". He added that Karl Willems, director of the dub, assembled a "stunning voice cast of professionals" with a "solid tone minus some of the cheesy yelling and screaming of other dubs". On the NPR show Fresh Air, John Powers said that Death Note is "at least as addictive as a show like Lost". Hyper wrote:

Running over thirty-seven 20 minutes episodes, the anime sticks much closer to the manga so takes a far more languid approach to storytelling, better fleshing out the fantastic characters of Light and his nemesis, L. Light in particular is one of the most layered characters to appear in anime in a long time.

Jacob Hope Chapman from Anime News Network praised Teru Mikami's role as bloody and flashy and even better than that of Near, Mello, and Misa. The Daily Telegraph's Henry St. Leger wrote, "What starts as a moral fable about the corruption of power becomes a slow-burning game of cat-and-mouse as Light is chased down by the world's greatest detective. Some droning voice acting leadens what is otherwise a brilliantly terse noir." Vulture's Maya Phillips wrote, "Beyond its deft twists and turns, Death Note also addresses questions about morality, justice, and capital punishment. All this, plus beautiful animation and well-written dialogue and plot, makes Death Note the cream of the animated crop."

The Death Note anime was one of the series to win Best TV Anime at the 2007 Tokyo International Anime Fair. In 2009, Death Note was ranked 51st in IGN's "Top 100 Animated Series" list.
