= Tokyo Jukebox =

Studio album by Marty Friedman
- Released: May 20, 2009
- Length: 57:02
- Label: Avex Trax

Marty Friedman chronology
Future Addict (2008)	Tokyo Jukebox (2009)	Bad DNA (2010)

Tokyo Jukebox is the eighth studio album by the American guitarist, producer and arranger Marty Friedman. It consists entirely of Japanese song covers, chosen by him and the readers of Nikkei Entertainment!.

Friedman revealed in 2018 that "Polyrhythm" was the most difficult song he had ever recorded in his entire musical career because it consisted of 8 guitar tracks, each recorded in a different octave, and its repetitiveness.

== Track listing ==
No.	Title	Length
1.	"Tsume Tsume Tsume" (Maximum the Hormone cover)	5:28
2.	"Gift" (Mr. Children cover)	4:24
3.	"Amagigoe" (Sayuri Ishikawa cover)	4:22
4.	"Story" (Ai cover)	5:02
5.	"Polyrhythm" (Perfume cover)	4:37
6.	"Kaeritaku Natta Yo" (Ikimono-gakari cover)	5:56
7.	"Tsunami" (Southern All Stars cover)	4:55
8.	"Yuki no Hana" (Mika Nakashima cover)	4:02
9.	"Eki" (Mariya Takeuchi cover)	4:46
10.	"Sekai ni Hitotsu Dake no Hana" (SMAP cover)	4:16
11.	"Romance no Kamisama" (Kohmi Hirose cover)	3:44
12.	"Ashita e no Sanka" (Alan cover)	6:18
Total length:		57:02
