= The Best "Love Winters" =

Compilation album by Kohmi Hirose
- Released: November 11, 1998
- Genre: J-pop
- Length: 58:19
- Label: Victor Entertainment

Kohmi Hirose chronology
rhapsody (1998)	The Best "Love Winters" (1998)	Music D. (1999)

The Best "Love Winters" (広瀬香美 THE BEST “Love Winters”, Hirose Kōmi Za Besuto Rabu Wintāzu) is a best of album released by the Japanese singer-songwriter Kohmi Hirose on November 11, 1998. The album is a compilation of her first 13 singles, most of which were written for the advertising campaigns of Alpen, a Japanese winter sporting goods store. Love Winters is Hirose's most successful album, reaching number 2 on the Oricon's Weekly Album charts, 27 for the 1998 End-of-Year Album charts, and selling over 2.4 million copies.

== Track list ==
All tracks are written by Kohmi Hirose.

No.	Title	Arranger(s)	Length
1.	"Ai ga Areba Daijōbu" (愛があれば大丈夫, "I'll Be All Right If There Is Love")	Shirō Sagisu	4:29
2.	"Futari no Birthday" (二人のBirthday, "Two People's Birthday")	Shirō Sagisu	5:44
3.	"Romance no Kamisama" (ロマンスの神様 Romansu no Kamisama, "The Cupid of Romance")	Komi Hirose, Takao Konishi	4:28
4.	"Shiawase o Tsukamitai" (幸せをつかみたい, "Grasp the Happiness You Want")	Komi Hirose	4:32
5.	"Gelaende ga Tokeru Hodo Koishitai" (ゲレンデがとけるほど恋したい Gerende ga Tokeru Hodo Koishitai, "The Slopes Will Melt From Our Love")	Komi Hirose	5:03
6.	"DEAR...again (Ver.2.05)"	Komi Hirose, Akimitsu Honma	6:03
7.	"Mafuyu no Kaerimichi" (真冬の帰り道, "The Way Back From the Dead of Winter")	Komi Hirose, Akimitsu Honma	4:21
8.	"promise"	Komi Hirose, Akimitsu Honma	4:39
9.	"Pianissimo" (ピアニシモ Pianishimo)	Komi Hirose, Akimitsu Honma	5:33
10.	"Groovy!"	Komi Hirose, Akimitsu Honma	4:17
11.	"Shiawase ni Naritai" (幸せになりたい, "I Want to Be Happy"; self-cover of song written for Yuki Uchida)	Akimitsu Honma	4:07
12.	"Always I Need"	Akimitsu Honma	4:41
Total length:			58:19
