= Deco Vs. Deco =

Video by Maximum the Hormone
- Released: March 19, 2008
- Genre: Metalcore
- Length: 421 minutes
- Language: Japanese
- Label: VAP

Maximum the Hormone chronology
| Debu Vs. Debu (2005) | Deco Vs. Deco (2008) | Deka Vs. Deka (2015) |

Deco Vs. Deco is the second DVD released by the Japanese rock band Maximum the Hormone on March 19, 2008. The DVD contains live performances, music videos and more extras. The RIAJ certified the DVD Gold selling more than 100,000 copies.

== Track listing ==
Live footage

1. "What's Up, People?!"
2. "Hōchō Hasami Cutter Knife Dosu Kiri (包丁・ハサミ・カッタ・ナイフ・ドス・キリ)"
3. "Kuso Breakin' Nou Breakin' Lily (糞ブレイキン脳ブレイキン・リリィー)"
4. "Policeman Benz (ポリスマンベンツ)"
5. "Kyokatsu (恐喝～kyokatsu～)"
6. "Zetsubō Billy (絶望ビリー)"
7. "Bu-ikikaesu!! (ぶっ生き返す!!)"
8. "Bikini Sports.Ponchin (ビキニ・スポーツ・ポンチン)"
9. "Futoshi (上原～FUTOSHI～)"
10. "Shimi (シミ)"
11. "Louisiana Bob (ルイジアナ・ボブ)"
12. "Black ¥ Power G-Men Spy (ブラック￥パワーGメンスパイ)"
13. "Falling Jimmy"
14. "Rolling 1000toon"
15. "Koi no Mega Lover (恋のメガラバ)"
16. "Chu Chu Lovely Muni Muni Mura Mura Purin Purin Boron Nururu Rero Rero (チューチュー ラブリー ムニムニ ムラムラ プリンプリン ボロン ヌルル レロレロ)"
17. "Nigire Tsutsu!! (握れっっ!!)
18. "Credits (Rock-impo Goroshi (ロッキンポ殺し) as background)"

Music videos

1. "What's Up, People?!"
2. "Koi no Mega Lover (恋のメガラバ)"
3. "Zetsubō Billy (絶望ビリー)"
4. "Bu-ikikaesu!! (ぶっ生き返す!!)"
5. "Bikini Sports Ponchin (ビキニ・スポーツ・ポンチン)"

Bonus footage

Deco Vs Deco includes a documentary about the tour, recording at the studio, making of the music videos, "2nd Ryo Challenge" and the "Documentary Inferno".
