= Rock Bankuruwase C/W Minoreba Rock =

"Rock Bankuruwase/Minoreba☆Rock"

Single by Maximum the Hormone

from the album Rock-impo Goroshi
- Released: 23 June 2004
- Genre: Nu metal; pop punk
- Length: 9:54
- Label: VAP

Maximum the Hormone singles chronology
"Enzui Tsuki Waru" (2003)	"Rock Bankuruwase" / "Minoreba☆Rock" (2004)	"Hōchō Hasami Cutter Knife Dosu Kiri/Rei Rei Rei Rei Rei Rei Rei Rei Ma Ma Ma Ma Ma Ma Ma Ma" (2005)

"Rock Bankuruwase C/W Minoreba☆Rock" (ロック番狂わせC／Wミノレバ☆ロック, Rokku Bankuruwase C/W Minoreba☆Rokku) is a double a-side maxi single released by Maximum the Hormone on June 23, 2004. It peaked at number 33 on Oricon Singles Chart.

== Track listing ==
No.	Title	Length
1.	"Rock Bankuruwase" (ロック番狂わせ)	2:18
2.	"Minoreba☆Rock" (ミノレバ☆ロック)	3:54
3.	"W×H×U× ~Washi Kate Honma wa Uretainjai~" (W×H×U×～ワシかてホンマは売れたいんじゃい～)	3:07
4.	"R.H.C.P. ga Boku o Sarai ni Yatte Kita" (R.H.C.P.が僕をさらいにやってきた)	0:35
Total length:		9:54

== Trivia ==
The single is released with a 'mystery' 2nd disc; a DVD. There are 4 available, one for each band member. All of the clips featured on the DVDs have been compiled as a special feature on Maximum the Hormone's 1st DVD; Debu Vs Debu.
