= Promise (Kohmi Hirose song) =

- Single cover art

Single by Kohmi Hirose

from the album Rhapsody
- Released: November 27, 1997
- Genre: J-pop; flamenco
- Length: 4:41
- Label: Victor Entertainment
- Songwriter: Kohmi Hirose
- Producer: Hirose

Kohmi Hirose singles chronology
"Natsu da Mon" (1997)	"Promise" (1997)	"Pianissimo (song)" (1998)

Audio sample
- "Promise": file; help

"Promise" (stylized as "promise") is a song recorded by Japanese singer-songwriter Kohmi Hirose, from her seventh studio album, Rhapsody (1998). It was released on November 27, 1997, by Victor Entertainment as the album's second single. It is Hirose's second best-selling single, behind "Romance no Kamisama", selling over 600,000 copies. "Promise" was featured in commercials for the Alpen company's 1998 winter campaign.

== Internet meme ==
The song was popularized on the Internet through its use in the "Get Down" (ゲッダン, Geddan) meme, which originated on Nico Nico Douga and then spread to YouTube. The meme featured glitchy gameplay footage from the Nintendo 64 game GoldenEye 007 achieved via slowly pulling the cartridge loose, but not loose enough to fully disconnect it, resulting in character models moving their limbs and bodies rapidly in abnormal fashion. People imitated the glitch in real life through stop motion and then superimposed the chorus of "Promise" over the resulting video.

== Chart performance ==
"Promise" entered the Oricon Singles Chart at number 14, with 32,000 copies sold. The song climbed one spot to number 13 in its second week, selling 34,000 copies, and again to number 12 on its third week, selling 42,000 copies. "Promise" peaked at number four on its fourth charting week, with 69,000 copies sold. It spent the following four weeks within the top ten, selling 244,000 copies. The single charted for a total of sixteen weeks, selling a reported total of 542,000 copies. It peaked at number ten on the monthly Oricon Singles Chart for the month of January 1998 and charted at number 45 on the year-end Oricon Singles Chart for the year 1998.

== Track listing ==
All tracks are written by Kohmi Hirose.

No.	Title	Arranger(s)	Length
1.	"Promise"	Akimitsu Honma; Kohmi Hirose	4:41
2.	"Chocolate"	Honma; Hirose	5:03
3.	"Promise" (Karaoke)	Honma; Hirose	4:41
Total length:			14:25

== Charts ==
Chart (1997–98)	Peak position
Japan Weekly Singles (Oricon)	4
Japan Monthly Singles (Oricon)	10
Japan Yearly Singles (Oricon)	45

== Certification ==
Region	Certification	Certified units/sales
Japan (RIAJ)	Platinum	542,000
Japan (RIAJ)	Gold	100,000* (digital)
