= Greatest the Hits 2011–2011 =

Single by Maximum the Hormone

from the album Yoshū Fukushū
- Released: 23 March 2011
- Genre: Metalcore
- Length: 14:15
- Label: VAP
- Songwriter(s): Maximum the Ryokun (all songs)

Maximum the Hormone singles chronology
"Tsume Tsume Tsume/"F"" (2008)	"Greatest the Hits 2011–2011" (2011)	"Korekara no Menkata Cottelee no Hanashi o Shiyou!" (2018)

"Greatest the Hits 2011–2011" is a triple A-side maxi single released by the Japanese heavy metal band Maximum the Hormone. The single was released on March 23, 2011. The title of the single is a pun by the band, telling the fans that: "Greatest Hits doesn't necessarily mean a collection of past titles. We can say these new songs are our best!". The single comes with three separate covers, one for each song, and also comes packaged with a "bonus booklet" which is a collected and edited version of Maximum the Ryokun's column in Bubuka magazine titled "Maximum The Ryokun's Legal Trip".

The single peaked at number 1 for two consecutive weeks on the Oricon charts selling more than 81,000 in its first week, and making this the first time Maximum the Hormone has ever topped a chart since their formation in 1997. It is also their best opening week, beating previous single "Tsume Tsume Tsume/'F'" who had sold approximately 62,000 copies in its first week. It was also certified by the RIAJ as gold for a shipping of more than 100,000 physical copies.

All three tracks are available on the album Yoshū Fukushū.

== Track listing ==
All tracks are written by Maximum the Ryokun

No.	Title	Length
1.	"Utsukushiki Hitobito no Uta" (鬱くしき人々のうた)	4:39
2.	"Maximum the Hormone"	4:55
3.	"My Girl"	4:51
Total length:		14:15

== Personnel ==
- Daisuke-han – unclean vocals
- Maximum the Ryokun – guitar, vocals
- Nao - drums – vocals
- Ue-chang - bass guitar – backing vocals
