= Mimi Kajiru Shinuchi =

EP by Maximum the Hormone
- Released: 18 November 2015
- Genres: Hardcore punk; nu metal
- Length: 20:32
- Label: VAP

Maximum the Hormone chronology
Yoshū Fukushū (2013)	Mimi Kajiru Shinuchi (2015)	Korekara no Menkata Cottelee no Hanashi wo Shiyou (2018)

Mimi Kajiru Shinuchi (耳噛じる 真打) is an EP by Japanese nu metal/hardcore punk band Maximum the Hormone, released on 18 November 2015. It was first made available as part of the set for the band's third video release Deka Vs. Deka. It consists of re-recordings from their 2002 EP Mimi Kajiru. The band's 2017 live comeback tour was titled after the EP.

This is Maximum the Hormone's last release with VAP, as the band would sign with Warner Music Japan in September 2018.

== Track listing ==
No.	Title	Length
1.	"Nigireeeeeeee!!" (握れっっっっっっっっ!!)	4:37
2.	"Johnny Tetsu Pipe III" (ジョニー鉄パイプIII)	2:50
3.	"Abara Bob (Abara Capsule Markets-Bob)" (アバラ・ボブ (アバラ・カプセル・マーケツボブ))	2:29
4.	"Usukimi Billy ~Kogimi Sairoku-hen~" (薄気味ビリー～濃気味再録編～)	3:20
5.	"Ningen Enpi (2015mix)" (人間エンピ (2015mix))	3:52
6.	"Motto Policeman Fuck" (もっとポリスマンファック)	1:51
7.	"Patrol Car Moyasu ~Sotsugyō~" (パトカー燃やす～卒業～)	1:33
Total length:		20:32

== Personnel ==
- Daisuke-han – lead and backing vocals
- Maximum the Ryokun – guitar, lead and backing vocals
- Ue-chang – bass guitar, backing vocals
- Nao – drums, backing and lead vocals
