= Yoshū Fukushū =

Studio album by Maximum the Hormone
- Released: July 31 2013
- Recorded: 2008-2013
- Studio: Innig Studio
- Genres: Metalcore; nu metal; experimental metal
- Length: 60:30
- Languages: Japanese, English
- Label: VAP

Maximum the Hormone chronology
Bu-ikikaesu (2007)	Yoshū Fukushū (2013)	Mimi Kajiru Shinuchi (2015)

Singles from Yoshū Fukushū
- 1. "Tsume Tsume Tsume/F" Released: July 9, 2008; 2. "Greatest the Hits 2011–2011" Released: March 23, 2011

Professional ratings
Review scores
Source	Rating
The Circle Pit	Positive
Metal Storm	4.5/5 stars

Yoshū Fukushū (予襲復讐, Yoshū Fukushū) is the fourth studio album by Japanese rock band Maximum the Hormone. It was released on July 31, 2013.

== Track listing ==
No.	Title	Length
1.	"Yoshū Fukushū" (予襲復讐)	5:13
2.	"Utsukushiki OP ~Tsuki no Bakugekiki~" (鬱くしきOP～月の爆撃機～)	0:31
3.	"Utsukushiki Hitobito no Uta" (鬱くしき人々のうた)	4:38
4.	"Benjo Sandal Dance" (便所サンダルダンス)	4:04
5.	"Chū 2 the Beam" (中2 ザ ビーム)	4:01
6.	"「F」"	4:07
7.	"Tsume Tsume Tsume" (爪爪爪)	4:35
8.	"Rock Oreimairi ~3 Chord de Omae Full Bokko~" (ロックお礼参り～3コードでおまえフルボッコ～)	2:19
9.	"Unbelievable! ~Suwomintsu Hokereiro Mifueho~" (アンビリーバボー!～スヲミンツ ホケレイロ ミフエホ～)	3:35
10.	"A-L-I-E-N" (え・い・り・あ・ん)	4:46
11.	"My Girl"	4:02
12.	"Mesubuta no Ketsu ni Binta (Kick mo)" (メス豚のケツにビンタ (キックも))	2:41
13.	"Beauty Korosseum" (ビューティー殺シアム)	5:22
14.	"Maximum the Hormone"	4:55
15.	"Koi no Sperm" (恋のスペルマ)	5:37
16.	"Untitled" (hidden track)	0:30
Total length:		60:30

== Track information ==
- "Benjo Sandal Dance" was used as the theme song for the Japanese release of Kick-Ass 2.
- Untitled track 16 is omitted on digital releases.

== Chart positions ==
=== Album ===
Year	Chart	Position
2013	Oricon Album	1
