= Mimi Kajiru =

EP by Maximum the Hormone
- Released: 23 October 2002
- Genre: Hardcore punk; nu metal
- Length: 21:14
- Label: Mimikajiru

Maximum the Hormone chronology
| Hō (2001) | Mimi Kajiru (2002) | Kusoban (2004) |

Professional ratings
Review scores
| Source | Rating |
|---|---|
| Metal Storm | 3.5/5 stars |

Mimi Kajiru (耳噛じる, Bitten on the Ear) is the second EP by Japanese rock band Maximum the Hormone, released on 23 October 2002. Most of the tracks were re-recorded for the band's 2015 EP Mimi Kajiru Shinuchi.

== Track listing ==
All tracks are written by Maximum the Ryokun.

| No. | Title | Length |
|---|---|---|
| 1. | "Nigire!!" (握れっっ!!) | 3:41 |
| 2. | "Johnny Tetsu Pipe" (ジョニー鉄パイプ) | 1:54 |
| 3. | "Abara Bob" (アバラ・ボブ) | 2:28 |
| 4. | "Johnny Mamamiya California ~Johnny Tetsu Pipe II~" (ジョニー・ママミヤ・カリフォニア～ジョニー鉄パイプII～) | 1:05 |
| 5. | "Sanpin" (三品-SANPIN-) | 1:36 |
| 6. | "Usukimi Billy" (薄気味ビリー) | 3:27 |
| 7. | "Nobodys" | 1:09 |
| 8. | "Ningen Enpi" (人間エンピ) | 4:00 |
| 9. | "Patrol Car Moyasu" (パトカー燃やす) | 0:40 |
| 10. | "Policeman Fuck" (ポリスマンファック) | 1:14 |
| Total length: | | 21:14 |

== Personnel ==
- Daisuke-han – lead and backing vocals, drums (9, 10)
- Maximum the Ryokun – guitar, backing and lead vocals
- Ue-chang – bass guitar, backing vocals
- Nao – drums (1–8), backing and lead vocals
