= Tsume Tsume Tsume/F =

"Tsume Tsume Tsume/"F""

Single by Maximum the Hormone

from the album Yoshū Fukushū
- Released: 9 July 2008
- Genre: Metalcore; alternative metal
- Length: 10:13
- Label: VAP

Maximum the Hormone singles chronology
"Koi no Mega Lover" (2006)	"Tsume Tsume Tsume/"F"" (2008)	"Greatest the Hits 2011–2011" (2011)

"Tsume Tsume Tsume/"F"" (Japanese: 爪爪爪／「F」, Hepburn: Tsume Tsume Tsume/「F」) is a double A-side maxi single by Japanese metal band Maximum the Hormone, released on July 9, 2008. The single reached number 2 on the Oricon Singles Chart and was certified gold by the RIAJ. The tracks "Tsume Tsume Tsume" and "F" were included in 2013's Yoshū Fukushū, released five years later.

== Track listing ==
All tracks are written by Maximum the Ryokun.

No.	Title	Length
1.	"Tsume Tsume Tsume" (爪爪爪)	4:16
2.	""F"" (「F」)	4:10
3.	"Kill All the 394"	1:47
Total length:		10:13

== Personnel ==
- Daisuke-han – vocals
- Nao – drums, vocals, backing vocals
- Maximum the Ryokun – guitar, vocals
- Ue-chang – bass, backing vocals

== Legacy ==
The song "F" is about the Dragon Ball character Frieza. Akira Toriyama, the creator of Dragon Ball, stated that he was listening to the song when he named the nineteenth animated movie in the series, Dragon Ball Z: Resurrection 'F'. He had met the band personally through a friend and one of the members admitted that they had been singing the song about Frieza. The song was featured in the film during Frieza's resurrection and a fight scene between Goku and Frieza.

American musician Marty Friedman covered "Tsume Tsume Tsume" for his 2009 album Tokyo Jukebox.

== Performance ==
The single peaked at number 2 on the Oricon Singles Chart and was the 44th bestselling single of 2008. It was certified Gold by the RIAJ, selling more than 100,000 copies in Japan and 150,000 copies worldwide.
