= Hō =

EP by Maximum the Hormone
- Released: 14 February 2001
- Genre: Hardcore punk; nu metal
- Length: 23:51
- Label: Sky

Maximum the Hormone chronology
A.S.A. Crew (1999)	Hō (2001)	Mimi Kajiru (2002)

Hō (鳳, Phoenix) is the debut EP by Japanese nu metal/hardcore punk band Maximum the Hormone. This was the second record and first EP of the band to feature the current lineup. This was the band's final release with Sky, as they later established their own music label Mimikajiru and later they would sign to VAP.

== Track listing ==
No.	Title	Length
1.	"Force"	4:30
2.	"Maximum the Hormone no Theme ~Men Kata Kotteri~" (マキシマム ザ ホルモンのテーマ～麺カタこってり～)	3:21
3.	"Maximum the 21-seiki" (マキシマム ザ 21世紀)	3:18
4.	"B×B×"	3:56
5.	"Imin no Buta (Kari)" (移民の豚 (仮))	3:45
6.	"W.H.U"	3:07
7.	"Machine-Gun Kuso Boogie" (マシンガン糞ブギ)	1:54
Total length:		23:51

== Personnel ==
- Daisuke-han – lead and backing vocals
- Maximum the Ryokun – guitar, backing and lead vocals
- Ue-chang – bass guitar, backing vocals
- Nao – drums, backing and lead vocals
