= Rock-impo Goroshi =

Studio album by Maximum the Hormone
- Released: 2 March 2005
- Genre: Nu metal; funk metal; hardcore punk
- Length: 33:29
- Label: VAP

Maximum the Hormone chronology
Kusoban (2004)	Rock-impo Goroshi (2005)	Bu-ikikaesu (2007)

Singles from Rock-impo Goroshi
- 1. "Rock Bankuruwase C/W Minoreba☆Rock" Released: 23 June 2004; 2. "Hōchō Hasami Cutter Knife Dosu Kiri/Rei Rei Rei Rei Rei Rei Rei Rei Ma Ma Ma Ma Ma Ma Ma Ma" Released: 25 November 2004

Professional ratings
Review scores
Source	Rating
Metal Storm	4/5 stars

Rock-impo Goroshi (ロッキンポ殺し, Rokkinpo Goroshi; lit. "Rock-impo Killing") is the second studio album by Japanese rock band Maximum the Hormone. The title refers to someone who can't feel the soul of rock music and has become "rock-impotent" in the eyes of vocalist and lyricist Maximum the Ryokun.

== Track listing ==
All tracks are written by Maximum the Ryokun.

No.	Title	Length
1.	"Rock-impo Goroshi" (ロッキンポ殺し)	4:02
2.	"Hōchō Hasami Cutter Knife Dosu Kiri" (~~包丁~~・~~ハサミ~~・~~カッター~~・~~ナイフ~~・~~ドス~~・~~キリ~~)	2:25
3.	"Nitro BB Sensō" (ニトロBB戦争)	2:06
4.	"Falling Jimmy"	2:09
5.	"Kawakita Saruin" (川北猿員)	1:52
6.	"Anal Whisky Ponce (Re-rec.)" (アナル・ウイスキー・ポンセ (Re-rec.))	2:14
7.	"Rock Bankuruwase" (ロック番狂わせ)	2:18
8.	"Haiyani Spain" (ハイヤニ・スペイン)	3:27
9.	"Uehara~Futoshi~" (上原～FUTOSHI～)	2:36
10.	"Rei Rei Rei Rei Rei Rei Rei Rei Ma Ma Ma Ma Ma Ma Ma Ma" (霊霊霊霊霊霊霊霊魔魔魔魔魔魔魔魔)	3:01
11.	"Rolling 1000toon"	2:46
12.	"Rock 'n' Roll Chainsaw" (ロックンロール・チェーンソー)	3:28
13.	"Koi no Kinako Watashi ni Kudasai" (恋のきなこ私にください)	1:07
Total length:		33:29

== Charting positions ==
=== Album ===
Year	Chart	Position
2005	Oricon Album Charts	27

== Personnel ==
- Daisuke-han – lead vocals
- Maximum the Ryokun – guitar, vocals
- Ue-chang – bass, backing vocals
- Nao – drums, vocals

== Notes ==
- "Rolling1000toon" was featured as an ending theme for the anime series Air Master and as a playable song in the Bemani games DrumMania 10th MIX and GuitarFreaks 11th MIX.
