= Romance no Kamisama =

Single by Kohmi Hirose

from the album Success Story
- Released: December 1, 1993
- Genre: J-pop
- Length: 4:29
- Label: Victor Entertainment
- Songwriter(s): Kohmi Hirose
- Producer(s): Hirose

Kohmi Hirose singles chronology
"Futari no Birthday" (1993)	"Romance no Kamisama" (1993)	"Dramatic ni Koishite" (1994)

Audio sample
- "Romance no Kamisama": file; help

"Romance no Kamisama" (ロマンスの神様, Romansu no Kamisama, "The Cupid of Romance", lit. "The God of Romance") is a song recorded by Japanese singer-songwriter Kohmi Hirose, from her third studio album, Success Story. It was released on December 1, 1993, by Victor Entertainment as the album's second single. It is Hirose's most successful single to date, selling two million copies in Japan alone. Romance no Kamisama was also the first of Hirose's songs to be featured by the Alpen company, a Japanese winter sports store, in their winter advertisements, resulting in the Japanese public affectionately naming Hirose the "Queen of Winter" (冬の女王, Fuyu no Joō).

== Appearances ==
Although the song was initially included on her third album Success Story, "Romance no Kamisama" has also been featured on the compilation albums The Best "Love Winters" (which has sold 2.4 million copies), Alpen Best, and Tie-Up Collection: Hirose Kohmi no Terebi de Kīta Ano Kyokutachi. Alpen Best also featured a piano-only arrangement of the song; this same version was later featured on Hirose's eleventh studio album Making My Life Better (2008).

== Covers ==
Several artists have covered "Romance no Kamisama", including the Exit Trance DJ Starving Trancer, featuring Maki on vocals. Haruko Momoi recorded a cover for her album More & More Quality RED: Anime Song Cover (2008). Marty Friedman recorded a version for his album Tokyo Jukebox (2009). In 2001, Italian vocalist Judy Crystal recorded an English-language cover titled "God of Romance" for the Dance Dance Revolution video game series, more specifically Dance Dance Revolution 5th Mix. Japanese idol and VTuber Tokino Sora recorded a version for her album Re:Play released on November 24, 2021.

== Chart performance ==
"Romance no Kamisama" entered the Oricon Singles Chart at number six, with 88,000 copies sold. The song hit number one on its third week on the chart, selling 139,000 copies. "Romance no Kamisama" remained in the number-one spot for three straight weeks, before getting edged out by Dreams Come True's "Winter Song" for a week. It returned to the top of the chart on its seventh charting week, bringing its total weeks atop the list to four. Oricon also recognized it as the number-one song of January 1994, the number one song for the first half of 1994, and the number two song for the whole of 1994, bested only by Mr. Children's "Innocent World". "Romance no Kamisama" ultimately sold 1.75 million physical copies. In an October 16, 2010, Ustream.tv recording of her Hirose Kohmi Radio de Follow Me radio show (later broadcast by JOLF on October 21), Hirose stated that before the song was released the Victor Entertainment president jokingly promised that if the single sold a million copies, he would take the entire recording staff to Disney World in Florida. Once it sold 1.7 million copies, the president followed through on his promise and sent ten staff members to Florida for nine days.

== Track listing ==
All tracks are written by Kohmi Hirose

No.	Title	Arranger(s)	Length
1.	"Romance no Kamisama" (ロマンスの神様, "The Cupid of Romance")	Kohmi Hirose; Takao Konishi	4:29
2.	"Na Na Na..."	Hirose; Konishi	4:15
3.	"Romance no Kamisama" (Original Karaoke)	Hirose; Konishi	4:29
4.	"Na Na Na..." (Original Karaoke)	Hirose; Konishi	4:15
Total length:			17:38

== Charts ==
Chart (1993–94)	Peak position
Japan Weekly Singles (Oricon)	1
Japan Monthly Singles (Oricon)	1
Japan Yearly Singles (Oricon)	2

== Certifications ==
Region	Certification	Certified units/sales
Japan (RIAJ)	4× Platinum	1,600,000^{^}
Japan (RIAJ) Digital single	Platinum	250,000^{*}
Streaming
Japan (RIAJ)	Gold	50,000,000^{†}
^{*} Sales figures based on certification alone.^{^} Shipments figures based on certification alone.^{†} Streaming-only figures based on certification alone.

== See also ==
- List of Oricon number-one singles
