= Kusoban =

EP by Maximum the Hormone
- Released: 21 January 2004
- Genre: Nu metal; funk metal
- Length: 20:40
- Label: Mimikajiru

Maximum the Hormone chronology
Mimi Kajiru (2002)	Kusoban (2004)	Rock-impo Goroshi (2005)

Singles from Kusoban
- 1. "Koi no Sweet Kuso Meriken" Released: 3 September 2003

Professional ratings
Review scores
Source	Rating
Metal Storm	3.5/5 stars

Kusoban (糞盤, Shit Disc) is the third EP by Japanese rock band Maximum the Hormone.

== Track listing ==
All tracks are written by Maximum the Ryokun

No.	Title	Length
1.	"Koi no Sweet Kuso Meriken" (恋のスウィート糞メリケン)	3:43
2.	"Seiritsū wa kannazuki o kōrasu kion." (生理痛は神無月を凍らす気温。)	2:51
3.	"Healthy Bob" (ヘルシー・ボブ)	2:17
4.	"Cefiro Radio Comeback ~Seishun Saikai~" (セフィーロ・レディオ・カムバック～青春最下位～)	2:34
5.	"Mr. Boogie Tambourine Man" (Mrブギータンブリンマン)	3:02
6.	"Heisei Strawberry Vibe" (平成ストロベリーバイブ)	3:12
7.	"Bōriki" (暴力-BOURIKI-)	1:37
8.	"Tatari-kun" (祟り君～たたりくん～)	0:48
Total length:		20:40

== Chart positions ==
Chart (2004)	Position
Oricon Albums Chart	72

== Personnel ==
- Daisuke-han – lead vocals
- Maximum the Ryokun – guitar, vocals
- Ue-chang – bass, backing vocals
- Nao – drums, vocals
