= Koi no Mega Lover =

Single by Maximum the Hormone

from the album Bu-ikikaesu
- Released: 5 July 2006
- Genre: Alternative metal; nu metal
- Length: 5:27
- Label: VAP
- Songwriter: Ryo Kawakita

Maximum the Hormone singles chronology
"Zawa... Zawa... Za.. Zawa...... Zawa" (2005)	"Koi no Mega Lover" (2006)	"Tsume Tsume Tsume/"F"" (2008)

"Koi no Mega Lover" (恋のメガラバ, Koi no Mega Raba) is a maxi single from the band Maximum the Hormone, released on July 5, 2006. The single charted on the Oricon charts at the position 9.

== Track listing ==
No.	Title	Length
1.	"Koi no Mega Lover" (恋のメガラバ)	5:27
2.	"Louisiana Bob" (ルイジアナ・ボブ)	3:40
3.	"Rockin' Uglymotion" (ロッキン・アグリーモーション)	1:59
4.	"Johnny Inbu Life" (ジョニー陰部LIFE)	2:14
Total length:		13:20
