= Bu-ikikaesu =

Studio album by Maximum the Hormone
- Released: March 14, 2007
- Recorded: Innig Studio
- Genre: Nu metal
- Length: 49:21
- Label: VAP

Maximum the Hormone chronology
Rock-impo Goroshi (2005)	Bu-ikikaesu (2007)	Yoshū Fukushū (2013)

Singles from Bu-ikikaesu
- 1. "Zawa...Zawa...Za..Zawa......Zawa" Released: November 16, 2005; 2. "Koi no Mega Lover" Released: July 5, 2006

Professional ratings
Review scores
Source	Rating
AllMusic	2.5/5 stars
Metal Storm	5/5 stars

Bu-ikikaesu (ぶっ生き返す; lit. "Come Back To Life") is the third studio album by Japanese heavy metal band Maximum the Hormone. It was the band's first album to chart on the Oricon charts, debuting at number five and selling 70,000 copies in its first week, after which it remained on the charts for seventy-eight weeks. The RIAJ certified the album Gold, selling more than 100,000 copies in Japan and 250,000 worldwide. In September 2007, Rolling Stone Japan rated Bu-ikikaesu #98 on their list of the "100 Greatest Japanese Rock Albums of All Time".

Three tracks went on for use in two anime series. "What's Up, People?!" and "Zetsubō Billy" were used as the opening and ending, respectively, for episodes 20–37 of Death Note. The song "Akagi" was used for the anime of the same name.

== Track listing ==
All tracks are written by Maximum the Ryokun.

No.	Title	Length
1.	"Bu-ikikaesu!!" (ぶっ生き返す!!)	3:54
2.	"Zetsubō Billy" (絶望ビリー)	3:44
3.	"Kuso Breakin' Nō Breakin' Lily" (糞ブレイキン脳ブレイキン・リリィー)	4:16
4.	"Louisiana Bob" (ルイジアナ・ボブ)	3:40
5.	"Policeman Benz" (ポリスマンベンツ)	4:09
6.	"Black ¥ Power G-Men Spy" (ブラック￥パワーGメンスパイ)	2:27
7.	"Akagi" (アカギ)	2:16
8.	"Kyōkatsu" (恐喝～Kyokatsu～)	3:36
9.	"Bikini Sports Ponchin" (ビキニ・スポーツ・ポンチン)	3:56
10.	"What's Up, People?!"	4:10
11.	"Chū Chū Lovely Muni Muni Mura Mura Purin Purin Boron Nururu Rero Rero" (チューチュー ラブリー ムニムニ ムラムラ プリンプリン ボロン ヌルル レロレロ)	3:06
12.	"Shimi" (シミ)	4:17
13.	"Koi no Mega Lover" (恋のメガラバ)	5:27
14.	"Untitled" (hidden track)	0:23
Total length:		49:21

== Track information ==
- The track title "Chū Chū Lovely Muni Muni Mura Mura Purin Purin Boron Nururu Rero Rero" is based on an assortment of sound effects in Japanese, chū chū (meaning the sound of a kiss) lovely muni muni (the sound of someone squeezing something soft) mura mura (the sound of being horny) purin purin (the sound with which large breasts are emphasised in Anime) boron (the sound of something that pops out) nururu (the sound of moving around in something wet and dirty) rero rero (the sound made by the tongue going over something).
- Untitled track 14 is omitted on digital releases.

== Personnel ==
- Daisuke-han – unclean lead and backing vocals
- Maximum the Ryokun – guitar, backing and clean lead vocals
- Ue-chang – bass guitar, backing vocals
- Nao – drums, backing and clean lead vocals
- Yasu-kun – recording engineer
- Takii – mastering

== Charts and certifications ==
=== Album ===
Year	Chart	Position
2007	Oricon Album Charts	5

=== Certification ===
Country	Sales	Certification
Japan	250,000	Gold
