= Maximum the Hormone =

Japanese heavy metal band

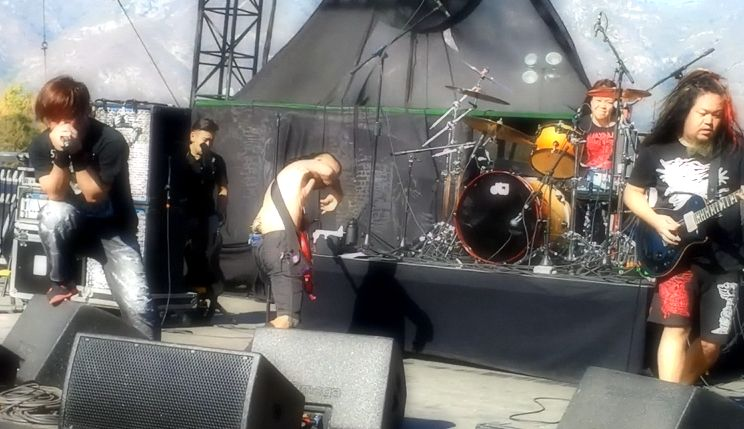
- Maximum the Hormone performing at Knotfest 2014

Background information
- Origin: Hachiōji, Tokyo, Japan
- Genres: Nu metal; hardcore punk; metalcore; funk metal; alternative metal
- Years active: 1997–present
- Labels: VAP (2002–2018); Warner Music Japan (2018–present); Sky; Mimikajiru
- Members: Daisuke-han; Nao; Maximum the Ryokun; Ue-chang
- Past members: Sugi; Key-yan
- Website: www.55mth.com www.maximumthehormone.jp

Maximum the Hormone (Japanese: マキシマム ザ ホルモン, Hepburn: Makishimamu za Horumon) is a Japanese heavy metal/hardcore punk band from Hachiōji, Tokyo. Their lineup consists of vocalist Daisuke-han, drummer Nao, guitarist Maximum the Ryokun, and bassist Ue-chang. Each member alternates singing lead vocals, often within the same song, with the exception of Ue-chang, who provides backup vocals almost exclusively.

The group is best known for their unconventional and experimental style of alternative metal music. Over their career, they have found success incorporating elements of heavy metal, hardcore punk, hip hop, pop, funk, and ska into their sound. Stylistically, their music runs the gamut from being dark and serious, to ironic or humorous, often with drastic shifts in tempo and mood over the course of a song. The band's eclectic nature frequently draws comparisons to System of a Down.

== History ==
=== 1997–2001: Formation, early days, and line-up change ===
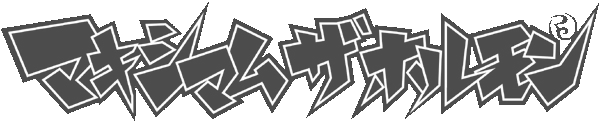
Maximum the Hormone written in Katakana, used as the band logo since 2000

Maximum the Hormone was formed in March 1997 by vocalist Daisuke-han, guitarist Key-yan, bassist Sugi and drummer Nao, initially as a cover band of the High-Lows as part of the member's university's light music club. In May, the band began recording original songs, half of them being melodic hardcore and the other half being hardcore punk. They played their first show in Hachiōji in June 1997. The following month, the band released their first demo tape, selling out all 100 copies. They also continued to play shows in Hachiōji and Shibuya and dropped the melodic hardcore parts of their music. In March 1998, a second demo tape was released with 200 copies and in May, the band embarked on their first domestic tour. In August, their first album A.S.A. Crew was recorded and the band participated in the collaboration album PUNKER SHOT 2, released by Sky Records. In December 1998, guitarist Key-yan and bassist Sugi left the band, which caused the release of A.S.A. Crew to be postponed until August 1999. In January 1999, Nao's younger brother Maximum the Ryokun joined the band, as he had played guitar since junior high-school and could also sing. He became the band's co-lead vocalist, handling guitars and singing duties while Daisuke handles screams and raps. After using a support bassist for their live shows, bassist Ue-chang joined in September 1999, completing their current lineup. The first release with this lineup would come in October 1999 in the form of another demo tape. The band then decided to write their band name in katakana to reflect the change in the band members, and the band also started incorporating Japanese into their lyrics. In 2001, the band released an EP, Hō.

When asked about the group's name in an interview, Maximum the Ryokun stated "Take it as you like, it means anything from the Japanese cuisine for cooking animal innards to the sensation of the maximum amount of your hormones coming to the boil! Although when we go abroad people think we’re just some sorta sexual-energy-drink". "Hormone" (or horumon) is a style of yakiniku (Japanese BBQ) where many of the typically discarded internal organs are grilled in bite sized pieces and eaten.

=== 2002–2007: Commercial success ===
In 2002, the band left Sky Records and signed with Mimikajiru Records. The band released the single, "Niku Cup", followed by a full-length album, Mimi Kajiru, in 2002. The EP Kusoban, released in 2004, featured heavy music mixed with light pop that has gained them mainstream attention. After the release of Kusoban, the band signed to VAP, a major record label.

The band released the full-length album Rock-impo Goroshi in 2005. The release caused a surge in their fanbase, as they began to sell out more shows, playing many rock festivals, and eventually releasing a live DVD, Debu Vs. Debu. In addition, "Rolling1000toon" was featured as an ending theme in the Air Master anime, as well as being featured in DrumMania 10th Mix as a playable song. The song's title is actually a play on words. Combined, the number 1000 (pronounced "sen"), and "toon" (pronounced "ton") form the phrase "rolling senton". A senton is a leaping move, in pro wrestling, that often includes somersaults. The concept is illustrated at the end of the music video, when the protagonist (bassist Ue-chang) fells the bully character by leaping into the air, doing several mid-air flips, then landing the final blow.

In 2006 the band entered popular culture with the song "Koi no Mega Lover", which reached number nine on the Oricon charts during the summer – their first top-ten hit in Japan. The band had three of their songs featured in anime series: "What's Up, People?!" and "Zetsubō Billy" are featured as the second opening and ending themes of Death Note, and "Akagi" is featured as the ending theme for Akagi.

Maximum the Hormone released their next album, Bu-ikikaesu, in 2007 The album debuted at number five on the Oricon chart; their first full album to reach that chart. Also, the album was certified Gold in Japan.

=== 2008–2010: First and second hiatus ===
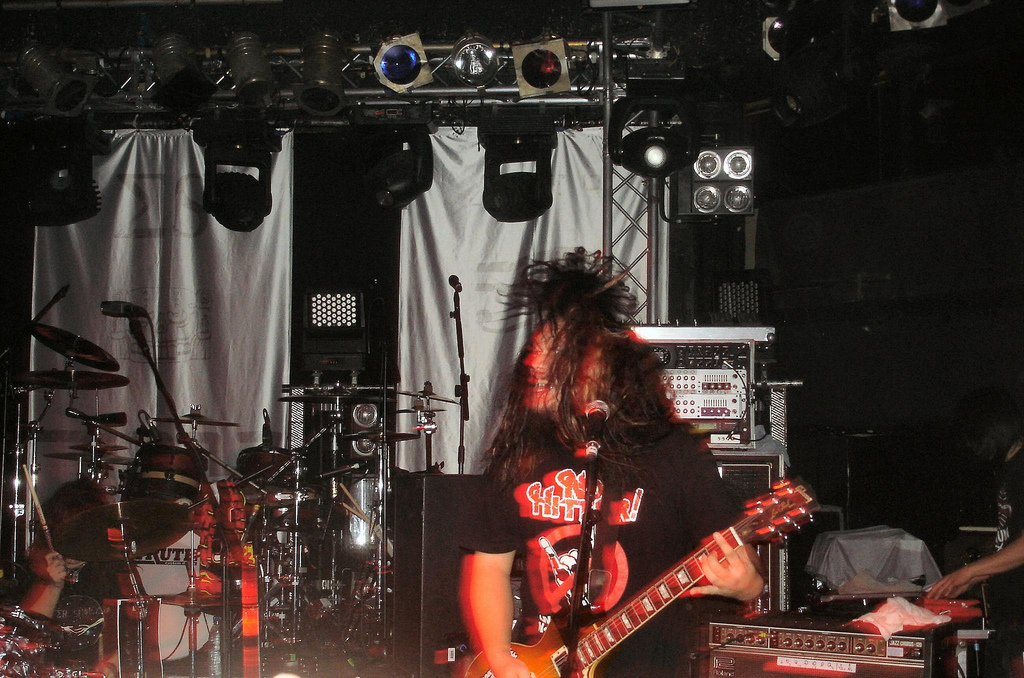
Maximum the Hormone performing in 2008

In 2008, the band released their second live DVD: Deco Vs. Deco, and made their first overseas appearances with a short tour through the United States and Canada in support of Dropkick Murphys. On May 3, Maximum the Hormone performed at the hide memorial summit alongside many other artists, in memory of the deceased musician. A new single titled "Tsume Tsume Tsume/F" was released at the start of the Tsume Tsume Tsume tour in July, and reached the number two spot on the Oricon weekly singles chart. The tour continued through October 2008, with an additional show on November 30. The subject of the song "F" is Dragon Ball character, Frieza.

On October 27, Maximum The Hormone made their first appearance in the United Kingdom, supporting Enter Shikari at the Bournemouth BIC. They continued to tour with Enter Shikari until November 3, playing venues in Exeter, Southampton and Folkestone, before ending with two nights at the London Astoria. However, prior to the Enter Shikari dates, it was announced that Daisuke would require corrective surgery on his throat, causing the band to go on temporary hiatus while he recovered. The hiatus started in December and lasted for several months. After Daisuke recovered from throat surgery the band went on to headline several shows in Japan with support from Bring Me the Horizon and Blessed by a Broken Heart in May 2009, as well as winning the award for Best Rock Video for "Tsume Tsume Tsume" in the 2009 MTV Video Music Awards Japan.

In 2009, Megadeth guitarist Marty Friedman performed an instrumental cover of "Tsume Tsume Tsume" on his tribute/cover album Tokyo Jukebox. Though not mentioned in the title, near the end of the track he segues into an abbreviated version of the song "Louisiana Bob". On November 19, 2009, the band released a statement via their official website stating that drummer Nao was pregnant, but after discussions with her bandmates and staff, Nao decided to continue with all shows. On November 3, However, Nao fell ill and was transported to the hospital, where she was told that it would be unhealthy for her and the baby to continue performing. This resulted in the band going on hiatus until Nao carried the baby to term, forcing them to cancel all shows including an appearance at the Soundwave Festival 2010 in Australia. On May 6, 2010, the band released a statement through their website stating that Nao gave birth to a healthy baby girl and that they would no longer be on hiatus. The band members appeared as extras in the live-action adaptation of BECK.

=== 2011–2014: Return to activity and Yoshū Fukushū ===
On February 7, 2011, the band released a video for the songs "Chiisana Kimi no Te (小さな君の手)" (Your Little Hands) and "Maximum the Hormone" on their official website. They released a single titled "Greatest the Hits 2011–2011" on March 23, debuting at number 1 spot on the Oricon weekly singles chart. In June of the same year, they toured Europe. In early August they played at Pentaport Rock Festival in Incheon, South Korea.

Maximum the Hormone performed the closing theme for the 2011 live-action television series QP.

The album Yoshū Fukushū was released on July 31, 2013, their first full album in six years. It was their first album to reach number one on Oricon's charts. The CD features unique packaging, as it is approximately the height and width of a standard DVD case, and bound like a manga. According to the band's official website, it is "A frantic 156-page book with 'Our Merciless Home'war'k' descriptions, a dialogue style track-by-track rundown for all 15 songs by Maximum the Ryokun, Ryokun's inner world is exposed by professional manga artists"

On June 2, the group released the video for the song "A-L-I-E-N", but as a prank, they placed it on a randomly relocating URL, so page visitors would only have one chance of seeing the video. The video for the album's title track, "Yoshū Fukushū", was released on July 26, 2013. The song "Benjo Sandal Dance" (Toilet Sandal Dance) had been used in a Stride gum commercial as well as the theme song for the Japanese release of Kick-Ass 2, featuring the band in full special effects makeup as early primates. In keeping with the band's quirky aesthetic, the song "Benjo Sandal Dance" lyrically references Maximum the Ryokun's habit of wearing toilet sandals, traditionally strictly only for wearing in the bathroom, at all times. As referenced in the song's lyrics, as well as their FAQ, he exclusively wears toilet sandals sold under the brand name VIC, made by Nishibe Chemical Co. Ltd. Dunhill. In September, the band announced a special merchandise package, including a T-shirt and limited edition VIC sandals with the Maximum the Hormone logo stamped on the heel.

=== 2015–present: Third hiatus and signing with Warner Music Japan ===
Maximum the Hormone in 2019

In November 2015, the band released their third live album, Deka vs. Deka. The album also came with a complete re-recording of their 2002 album Mimi Kajiru as a bonus disc. The re-recording, entitled Mimi Kajiru Shinuchi, was also released alongside a book containing sheet music for the songs on Yoshū Fukushū, which was released in February 2016. The band was in the midst of another hiatus as drummer Nao announced her intention to try for another baby; her second child was born in May 2016. The band returned to activity in 2017, announcing the Mimi Kajiru Shinuchi Tour across Japan.

In September 2018, the band released a track entitled "Haikei VAP-dono" (with Daisuke playing drums), to announce their departure from VAP to sign a new record deal with Warner Music Japan. A series of shows in October and November 2018 were cancelled due to Daisuke suffering a herniated disc. In November 2018, they released a music video for "Korekara no Menkata Kotteri no Hanashi wo Shiyou", which commented on fans' negative response to Maximum the Ryokun's dramatic weight loss. An EP also titled Korekara no Menkata Cottelee no Hanashi wo Shiyou was released on November 28, 2018. On May 5, 2019, the band made a surprise appearance at the Viva La Rock 2019 festival, announcing that they would resume live performances and launch a June 2019 tour of Japan.

In 2021, the band released the song "Kamigami" (KAMIGAMI-神噛-; lit. "Gods" / "God Biting"), which was used as the opening theme for the anime Record of Ragnarok. Their song "Hawatari 2 Oku-senchi" was featured as one of the twelve ending theme songs and insert song for the anime Chainsaw Man. Daisuke-han and Nao also host the weekly Maximum the Hormone radio show. In July 2023, the band released a single without a title given. The title was later revealed to be "Koi no America" with the release of the music video in August.

== Musical style ==
Maximum the Hormone performs nu metal and hardcore punk but incorporates many elements of pop, funk, ska, hip hop, and extreme metal into their music as well. The band is also labeled as alternative metal, funk metal, groove metal, and more recently metalcore by some critics. AllMusic's Alexey Eremenko writes that Maximum the Hormone is distinguished by "a general lack of the teenage angst and self-importance characteristic of true nu-metalers." Their funky sound, heard in many songs such as "Maximum 21st Century", is mostly produced by bass player Ue-chang's unconventional use of the slapping technique; he is often referred to as "The Chopper" by the band (both in their FAQ, and their song "A-L-I-E-N"). Lead vocals are split between Daisuke, Ryo, and Nao, with Ryo and Nao providing the melodic vocals while Daisuke provides the screams and rapping. Ue-chang is yet to perform lead vocals (aside from a verse on the joke track "Chiisana Kimi no Te") but does perform backing vocals alongside the rest of the band.

Their music-videos often have a tongue-in-cheek aspect as well, such as "Rolling1000toon", which features an underdog (with the requisite karate training montage) facing up to a bully, or "Koi no Mega Lover", which features an awkward young man whose clumsy amorous advances are rejected by a beautiful girl at a party.

== Band members ==
Current members

- Daisukehan (ダイスケはん, Daisuke-han), real name Daisuke Tsuda (津田 大輔, Tsuda Daisuke) – screaming vocals, rapping (1997–present), percussion (2018–present), keyboards (2021–present)
- Nao (ナヲ, Nawo), real name Nao Kumamoto (熊本 奈緒, Kumamoto Nao), née Kawakita (川北) – drums, clean vocals (1997–present), percussion (1997–2018)
- Maximum the Ryokun (マキシマムザ亮君, Makishimamu za Ryōkun), real name Ryō Kawakita (川北 亮, Kawakita Ryō) – guitar, clean vocals (1999–present), unclean vocals (2007–present)
- Ue-chang (上ちゃん, Ue-chan), real name Futoshi Uehara (上原 太, Uehara Futoshi) – bass, backing vocals (1999–present)

Former members

- Sugi, real name Hideo Sugiura (杉浦 秀夫, Sugiura Hideo) – guitar, backing vocals (1997–1998)
- Key-yan, real name Kiichiro Yoshikawa (吉河 喜一郎, Yoshikawa Kiichiro) – bass, backing vocals (1997–1998)

Timeline

== Discography ==
- A.S.A. Crew (1999)
- Rock-impo Goroshi (2005)
- Bu-ikikaesu (2007)
- Yoshū Fukushū (2013)

== Awards and nominations ==
CD Shop Awards

Year	Nominee / work	Award	Result
2014	Yoshū Fukushū	Grand Prix	Won

MTV Video Music Awards Japan

Year	Nominee / work	Award	Result
2009	"Tsume Tsume Tsume"	Best Rock Video	Won
2014	Yoshū Fukushū	Album of the Year	Nominated

Space Shower Music Video Awards

Year	Nominee / work	Award	Result
2009	Maximum the Hormone	Special Award	Won
2012	"Maximum the Hormone"	Best Your Choice	Won
2014	"Yoshū Fukushū"	Best Video of the Year	Won

== Tours and concerts ==
=== Japan ===
- Punkspring with Various Artists (2007)
- Cursive Japan Tour with guests Maximum the Hormone and Beat Crusaders (2007)
- Rock in Japan Festival with Various Artists (2007)
- Rising Sun Rock Festival with Various Artists (2007)
- Summer Sonic Festival with Various Artists (2008)
- Summer Sonic Festival with Various Artists (2011)
- Rock in Japan Festival with Various Artists (2012)
- Ozzfest Japan with Various Artists (2013)
- Summer Sonic Festival with Various Artists (2013)
- Rock in Japan Festival with Various Artists (2013)
- Knotfest Japan with Various Artists (2014)
- Summer Sonic Festival with Various Artists (2017)

=== Overseas ===
- Enter Shikari Tour in UK with guests Maximum the Hormone and P-Dex (2008)
- Enter Shikari Tour in UK with guests Maximum the Hormone, Canterbury, and P-Dex (2008)
- Enter Shikari Tour in UK with guests Maximum the Hormone, An Albatross, and P-Dex (2008)
- Dropkick Murphys Tour in US with guest Maximum the Hormone (2008)
- Hellfest in France with Various Artists (2011)
- Pentaport Rock Festival in South Korea with Various Artists (2011)
- Knotfest in US with Various Artists (2014)
- Knotfest in Mexico with Various Artists (2017)
- Super Japan Expo in Chile with Various Artists (2017)
- European Tour 2022
