= Kaba-chan =

Japanese choreographer

- Born: June 19, 1969 (age 56); Yanagawa, Fukuoka, Japan
- Other name: Ichika Kabashima
- Occupations: Celebrity, choreographer
- Years active: 1996-present
- Agent: Platinum Production

Kaba-chan (KABA.ちゃん), born on June 19, 1969, in Yanagawa, Fukuoka, is a transgender woman who is a Japanese tarento and choreographer. After studying dance in New York City, she returned to Japan and was a member of the musical group Dos with Taeco Nishikawa and Asami Yoshino.

== Life and career ==
As a celebrity, Kaba-chan was open with her sexuality. While she was already known for her flamboyant character in Dos, she came out as a gay man publicly on television on a 2002 episode of the Japanese variety show Dancing Sanma Palace. In October 2014, when appearing on the talk show Uchi Kuru!? with drag queen Mitz Mangrove and transvestite LGBT activist Matsuko Deluxe, Kaba-chan revealed that she had undergone an orchiectomy that past June, in addition to having had plastic surgery and begun hormone therapy, and intended to have her gender officially changed in the koseki. In July 2015, she revealed while on the television show Non-Stop! that she was preparing to travel abroad to undergo counseling in preparation for sex reassignment surgery, as the Japanese law requires she medically transition before being allowed to have her gender legally changed, saying she may have been born a man but would like to die as a woman. In August, she appeared on a special women's only talk show promoting the release of the film Piece of Cake and announced that she would be going out of Japan to wait for her surgery. She expressed a desire to have her gender change officially recognized in front of a crowd at the National Olympic Stadium and said that fellow LGBT celebrities Mitz Mangrove, Matsuko Deluxe, and Ikko were all supportive of her decision and wished her good health. In September 2016, she announced that she had officially changed her legal name to Ichika Kabashima (椛島 一華, Kabashima Ichika).

Kaba-chan was also a contestant on two editions of Japan's Dancing with the Stars, entitled Shall We Dance? (シャル・ウィ・ダンス?, Sharu Wi Dansu?), winning its "1 day special" episode with dancing partner Hidemi Yamamoto performing a pasodoble and also winning its second "1 day special" with partner RYOKO performing a salsa.

== Choreography ==
- SMAP
  - SMAP×SMAP
  - "Sekai ni Hitotsu Dake no Hana"
  - SMAP concerts
- Namie Amuro
  - "Body Feels Exit"
  - "Chase the Chance"
  - "Don't Wanna Cry"
  - "You're My Sunshine"
  - "Sweet 19 Blues"
  - "A Walk in the Park"
  - "How to Be a Girl"
  - "Toi et Moi"
  - Play
  - Namie Amuro "Play" Tour 2007–2008
- Tomomi Kahara
  - "keep yourself alive"
  - "I Believe"
  - "Arigato ne!"
- dos
  - "Baby baby baby"
  - "More Kiss"
  - "Close Your Eyes"
- Toshinori Yonekura
- Tanpopo
  - "Last Kiss"
- MAX
  - "Love impact"
  - "Ginga no Chikai"
- Arisa Mizuki
- Sanpei
  - "Sanpei Days"
  - "Sanpei no 39 Days"
  - "Sanpei no Everyday"
- Rag Fair
  - "Rabu Rabu na Couple, Furi Furi de Chū"
- Chiaki with Kaba-chan
  - "Tsuraine Akachan!"
- Keiko Matsuzaka
- Pink Lady
  - Memorial concert
- Peter
- Pabo
  - "Koi no Hexagon"
- Yazima Beauty Salon
  - "Hamaguri Bomber"

== Discography ==
- "Challenger!!/Smile" (チャレンジャー!!/スマイル, Charenjā!!/Sumairu; April 28, 2004) performed by Rica Matsumoto/Toshiko Ezaki
  - Track 3: "Pokémon Ieru ka na? 2004" (ポケモン言えるかな? 2004) performed by Kaba-chan with the Dangerous Friends × 3 (KABA.ちゃん with 愉快な仲間×3, Kaba.chan wisu Kiken na Nakama kakeru 3)
- "Tsuraine Akachan!/Saikin Hayari no Make Uta" (つらいね赤ちゃん!/最近ハヤリのメイク歌, Tsuraine Akachan!/Saikin Hayari no Meiku Uta; July 7, 2004) performed by Chiaki with Kaba-chan
- "Odorimasenka?" (踊りませんか?; August 24, 2005) performed by C.K.M. (Chiaki, Kaba-chan, & Monroe)

== Filmography ==
=== Film ===
- Arashi no Yoru Ni - Grandmother goat
- Pokémon: Destiny Deoxys - Voice cameo
- Yazima Beauty Salon The Movie: Reaching a Nevada Dream - Mysterious cleaning lady
- Kamen Rider × Kamen Rider Wizard & Fourze: Movie War Ultimatum - Yu Kamimura
- Kamen Rider Wizard in Magic Land - Yu Kamimura
- Kamen Rider × Kamen Rider Gaim & Wizard: The Fateful Sengoku Movie Battle - Yu Kamimura

=== Television ===
- Waratte Iitomo! (regular from October 2002 to March 2005)
- Pokémon Chronicles
- Super Morning commentator
- Jungle Tantei (2009) - Hippo (Voice)
- Kamen Rider Wizard (2012) - Yu Kamimura
