= Concentration 20 =

Studio album by Namie Amuro
- Released: July 24, 1997
- Recorded: 1996–1997
- Studio: Record Plant (Los Angeles); Sony Music (New York City); TK Sequence 1105st (Tokyo)
- Genre: Dance-pop; pop rock
- Length: 56:17
- Language: English; Japanese
- Label: Avex Trax
- Producer: Tetsuya Komuro

Namie Amuro chronology
Original Tracks Vol.1 (1996)	Concentration 20 (1997)	181920 (1998)

Singles from Concentration 20
- 1. "A Walk in the Park" Released: November 27, 1996; 2. "Can You Celebrate?" Released: February 19, 1997; 3. "How to Be a Girl" Released: May 21, 1997

Concentration 20 is the third studio album by Japanese singer Namie Amuro. It was released on July 24, 1997, by Avex Trax. The album's musical style is a fusion of genres including pop, dance, rock, reggae and ska. Unlike Amuro's previous effort, Sweet 19 Blues (1996), which primarily had lyrics written by Tetsuya Komuro, Concentration 20's lyrics were mostly written by Marc Panther. Komuro did, however, compose and arrange most of the album's songs and wrote the lyrics to three of them. It was Amuro's second solo album since splitting up with Super Monkey's.

"A Walk in the Park" was released as the album's lead single on November 27, 1996. The single was very successful, becoming Amuro's fourth number one single on the Oricon Singles Chart and fourth million-seller. The second single, "Can You Celebrate?", was released on February 19, 1997. It became an unprecedented smash hit, selling over 2.29 million copies and remains the best-selling physical single by a female soloist in Japanese music history. "Can You Celebrate?" was certified double million by the Recording Industry Association of Japan (RIAJ), her first and last single to receive such a certification. The rock-infused third single, "How to Be a Girl", reached number one and sold over 770,000 copies, becoming Amuro's sixth number one single.

The album received positive reviews from music critics upon release, calling it more sophisticated than its predecessor. Concentration 20 was massively successful, premiering at the top of the Oricon Albums Chart with first-week sales of over 824,000 copies. It resided on the charts for 28 weeks, and was the seventh best-selling album of the year, selling nearly two million copies and is the 80th best-selling album of all time in Japan. Combined with the sales of its singles, Concentration 20 has sold around 4.5 million copies.

== Background and recording ==
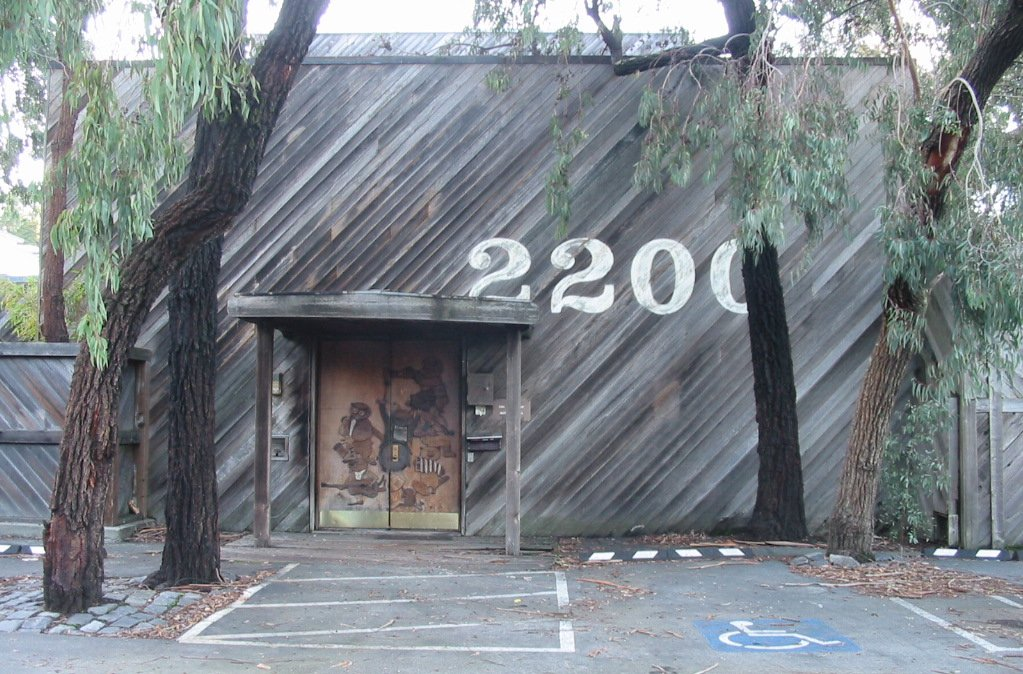
The Record Plant (Hollywood, California) was one of the studios where the album was recorded.

In summer 1996, Amuro released her second album Sweet 19 Blues, which was her first release since severing ties with Super Monkey's. The album was a mammoth commercial success, reaching number one on the Oricon Albums Chart, receiving a triple million certification from the RIAJ, spawning three chart-toppers, and was even the best-selling Japanese album of all time for a brief moment. By the end of the year, Sweet 19 Blues was named the second best-selling album in Japan of 1996, trailing behind Globe's eponymous debut album.

After this monumental success, recording for its follow-up began immediately. Much of the recording of Concentration 20 was done in the United States, primarily in California and New York. Two weeks were devoted to recording in Santa Monica. The title of the album was reportedly chosen because: "the studio at that time was on 20th Street in Santa Monica, and that is where we concentrated". Along with: "the 20th century is almost over, so let's concentrate on the time we have left", along with, "can we keep listening to this album throughout the 20th century?" The album was named so that it could be played with various meanings, such as "people who were 19 years old when Sweet 19 Blues was released are now entering their 20s", and so on, to broaden the imagination. Coincidentally, the title and Amuro's age at the time of release matched even though she was not aware of it. Other well-known artists such as Marc Panther, Koji Kubo, and m.c.A.T (Akio Togashi) also participated in the production of the album. "Storm" features m.c.A.T, as on the previous album.

== Composition ==
The album concept was "Fancy & Cool", with the "glamorous and flashy" part emphasized in "Can You Celebrate?" and the "cool" part in "Close Your Eyes, Close To You", "Concentration 20 (Make You Alright)" and "Whisper". The album embodies an array of styles including pop, rock and reggae. Unlike her previous album, which was heavy on the pseudo-R&B side, Concentration 20 was practically void of it; therefore, the album took on a more electronic style similar to that of her producer's group, Globe.

Opening the album is the industrial rock influenced track "Concentration 20 (Make You Alright)". "B w/z you" is a mid-tempo number with a rock beat and a powerful hammering sound. "Close Your Eyes, Close To You" is a Euro-style electronic rock tune with an intro that is prolonged and dynamic, leading the listener to believe it is an instrumental. "Me Love Peace !!" is a reggae-style number with a ska beat that evokes the tropical mood of Okinawa. She would not attempt a similar style again until 2005's "Want Me, Want Me", which featured prominent dancehall and reggaeton influences. "No Communication" is a dance pop number. "A Walk In The Park" is a brisk electronic rock number with a chorus that envelops the listener in warm sunlight; Komuro participates in the track by singing in the chorus. "To-Day" is a mellow song with contemporary AOR influences.

"Storm" is full-fledged rap number written by m.c.A.T. and composed by Akio Togashi. "Whisper" is song that has a composition that changes from the whispering sound of the title to intense electronic rock. "Can You Celebrate?" is a power ballad with a gospel-like chorus, a string orchestra and a piano sound. "I Know…" is an instrumental with an electric sound. "How to be a Girl" is an upbeat dance rock number.

== Promotion ==
=== Singles and other songs ===
The singles from this album were very successful, two were million sellers and all three reached the top spot of the Oricon Singles Chart.

"A Walk in the Park" was released as the album's lead single on November 27, 1996, four months after the massive success of Sweet 19 Blues. It became her fourth number one and million selling single. The single spent seven weeks into the top five and eight weeks in top ten totally. "A Walk in the Park" was the thirteenth best-selling single of the year 1997 in Japan. It was certified million in January 1997. "A Walk in the Park" ranks as her fifth best-selling single in the country.

February 19, 1997, saw the release of the album's second single, "Can You Celebrate?". Amuro began the year 1997 with her defining single and biggest success to date. It opened at the top spot on the singles chart with over 800,000 copies sold in its first week, the highest first week sales for any of Amuro's singles and the eighth highest opening sales of all time for a CD single in Japan. It spent two consecutive weeks at number one, seven weeks in the top five and eight weeks in top ten totally. It charted for forty weeks. "Can You Celebrate?" was the biggest-selling single of 1997, and is the fourteenth best-selling single in Japanese music history, with sales of over 2.29 million copies. It also received a double million certification from the Recording Industry Association of Japan (RIAJ) in March 1997, making it her only single to accomplish this. A maxi-single reissue of "Can You Celebrate?" was released on Christmas Day 1997 to commemorate Amuro's nuptial with Masaharu "Sam" Maruyama and was also successful with about 500,000 units sold, while also being certified platinum in January 1998. In December 1997, the song helped her to win the Best Single Award at the 39th Japan Record Awards.

"How to Be a Girl" is the third and last single from the album and was released on May 21, 1997. "How to Be a Girl" is Amuro's first attempt at rock music. The single still managed to be a commercial success, spending two consecutive weeks at number one and selling over 770,000 copies, included over 300,000 copies purchased in its opening week. "How to Be a Girl" was also the 23rd best-selling single of 1997. In June 1997, the single was certified million. "How to Be a Girl" is Amuro's seventh best-selling single overall.

=== Tie-ups and theme songs ===
"A Walk in the Park" and "Can You Celebrate?" were both jingles for Maxell UD commercials and "Whisper" was used as the background music for the Maxell MD74 commercial. "Can You Celebrate?" was also the theme song of the dorama Virgin Road. "How to Be a Girl" was used as background music in four commercials for Sea Breeze products. The first commercial was promoting a sun lotion, the second a shampoo, the third a deodorant and the last a moisturizer. "No Communication" was used as background music in a commercial for the DyDo Mistio drinks.

=== Live appearances and tours ===
Concentration 20 Tour
- Tour by Namie Amuro
- Associated album: Concentration 20
- Start date: July 26, 1997
- End date: August 13, 1997
- Legs: 1
- No. of shows: 8

Namie Amuro concert chronology
- First Anniversary Live (1996); Concentration 20 Tour (1997); Genius 2000 Tour (2000)

Two days after the release of the album, she started her first dome tour titled Mistio Presents Namie Amuro Summer Stage '97 Concentration 20 to support the album, which drew 300,000 spectators at four major domes: Osaka Dome, Tokyo Dome, Fukuoka Dome, and Nagoya Dome. Subsequently, a live release titled Namie Amuro Concentration 20 Live in Tokyo Dome was released on December 3, 1997, followed by additional formats on later dates. The initial VHS release debuted at No. 43 on the Oricon and charted for twelve weeks, while the 20th Anniversary DVD edition debuted at No. 65 on the Oricon charts, and charted for three weeks.

Concentration 20 Tour set list
1. "Close Your Eyes, Close to You"
2. "I Was a Fool"
3. "Private"
4. "Don't Wanna Cry"
5. "A Walk in the Park"
6. "No Communication"
7. "Storm"
8. "Concentration 20 (Make You Alright)"
9. "Sweet 19 Blues"
10. "B w/z You"
11. "Body Feels Exit" (Latin House Mix)
12. "Whisper"
13. "Chase the Chance"
14. "How to Be a Girl"

Encore

15. "Let's Do the Motion"
16. "You're My Sunshine"
17. "Can You Celebrate?"
18. "Me Love Peace!!"

Tour dates
Date (1997)	City	Country	Venue	Attendance
July 26	Osaka	Japan	Osaka Dome	300,000
July 27	Osaka	Japan	Osaka Dome	300,000
August 2	Tokyo	Japan	Tokyo Dome	300,000
August 3	Tokyo	Japan	Tokyo Dome	300,000
August 9	Fukuoka	Japan	Fukuoka Dome	300,000
August 10	Fukuoka	Japan	Fukuoka Dome	300,000
August 12	Nagoya	Japan	Nagoya Dome	300,000
August 13	Nagoya	Japan	Nagoya Dome	300,000

== Reception ==
Professional ratings
Review scores
Source	Rating
AllMusic	3.5/5 stars

Music critics gave Concentration 20 positive feedback. Ted Mills of AllMusic gave the record three and a half stars out of five, saying that the album has "mature effort" written all over it. Despite this, he still stated that it felt forced and Amuro's voice is still limited by her range. In 2014, the Japanese website Goo conducted a survey to determine which of Amuro's albums the Japanese public thought was her best; Concentration 20 received the sixth highest number of votes, with 216 votes in total.

Concentration 20 debuted at number one on the Oricon Albums Chart, with 824,980 copies sold in its first week of availability. It again nabbed the top spot on the charts in its second week, with sales of 362,440 copies. On its third week, Concentration 20 dropped to number four, shifting 229,550 copies. In total, it lasted seven weeks in the top ten, and stay in the top 300 chart for 28 weeks. The album was ranked as the seventh best-selling album of the year by Oricon, as well as the year's best-selling album by a female soloist. A month after the album's premiere, in August 1997, Amuro became the first teenage popster to surpass the 20 million single and album sales mark on Oricon. During the same month, Concentration 20 was certified double million by the Recording Industry Association of Japan (RIAJ) for shipments of over two million copies nationwide. In all, Concentration 20 sold about 1.9 million copies during its chart run. Concentration 20 is Amuro's third best-selling LP behind Finally and Sweet 19 Blues according to Oricon Style, as well as the fifty-sixth best-selling album in Japan for the 1990s decade.

== Track listing ==
Concentration 20 track listing
No.	Title	Lyrics	Music	Arranger(s)	Length
1.	"Concentration 20 (Make You Alright)"	Marc Panther	Tetsuya Komuro	Tetsuya Komuro	4:07
2.	"B w/z You"	Marc Panther	Tetsuya Komuro	Tetsuya Komuro	5:03
3.	"Close Your Eyes, Close to You"	Marc Panther	Tetsuya Komuro	Tetsuya Komuro	5:50
4.	"Me Love Peace!!"	Marc Panther	Tetsuya Komuro	Tetsuya Komuro	4:29
5.	"No Communication"	Marc Panther	Tetsuya Komuro	Tetsuya Komuro	4:14
6.	"A Walk in the Park"	Tetsuya Komuro	Tetsuya Komuro	Tetsuya Komuro	5:50
7.	"To-day"	Marc Panther	Cozy Kubo	Cozy Kubo	4:41
8.	"Storm"	m.c.A.T	Akio Togashi	Akio Togashi	3:07
9.	"Whisper"	Marc Panther	Tetsuya Komuro	Tetsuya Komuro	5:08
10.	"Can You Celebrate?"	Tetsuya Komuro	Tetsuya Komuro	Tetsuya Komuro	6:15
11.	"I Know..."		Tetsuya Komuro	Tetsuya Komuro	3:09
12.	"How to Be a Girl"	Tetsuya Komuro, Marc Panther	Tetsuya Komuro	Tetsuya Komuro	4:24

== Personnel ==
=== Musicians ===
- Namie Amuro – vocals, background vocals
- Lynn Mabry – background vocals
- Valerie Mayo – background vocals
- Akio Togashi – background vocals, keyboard
- Will Wheaton Jr. – background vocals
- Cozy Kubo – keyboard
- Tetsuya Komuro – backing vocals, guitar, keyboard, synthesizer
- Kazuhiro Matsuo – bass, guitar
- Kenji Sano – bass
- Ataru Sumiyoshi – bass
- Michael Thompson – guitar

=== Production ===
- Producers – Tetsuya Komuro
- Mixing – Eddie Delena
- Vocal direction – Tetsuya Komuro, Kenji Sano
- Photography – Itaru Hirama
- Art direction – Tycoon Graphics

== Charts ==
=== Weekly charts ===
Chart (1997)	Peak position
Japanese Albums (Oricon)	1
Taiwanese International Albums (IFPI)	1

=== Year-end charts ===
Chart (1997)	Position
Japanese Albums (Oricon)	7

=== Decade-end charts ===
Chart (1990–1999)	Position
Japanese Albums (Oricon)	56

=== All-time chart ===
Chart	Position
Japanese Albums (Oricon)	80

== Sales and certifications ==
Region	Certification	Certified units/sales
Japan (RIAJ)	2× Million	1,929,860
