= List of Oricon number-one singles of 1996 =

The following is a list of Oricon number-one singles of 1996.

== Oricon Weekly Singles Chart ==
Issue date	Song	Artist(s)	Ref.
January 1	"To Love You More"	Celine Dion with Kryzler & Kpmpany	
January 8	"To Love You More"	Celine Dion with Kryzler & Kpmpany	
January 15	"Departures"	Globe	
January 22	"My Friend"	Zard	
January 29	"Departures"	Globe	
February 5	"Departures"	Globe	
February 12	"Sora mo Toberuhazu"	Spitz	
February 19	"Namonaki Uta"	Mr. Children	
February 26	"Made in Japan"	V6	
March 4	"Sobakasu"	Judy and Mary	
March 11	"Dahlia"	X Japan	
March 18	"Mienai Chikara (Invisible One)/Move"	B'z	
March 25	"Don't Wanna Cry"	Namie Amuro	
April 1	"Don't Wanna Cry"	Namie Amuro	
April 8	"End of Sorrow"	Luna Sea	
April 15	"Don't Wanna Cry"	Namie Amuro	
April 22	"Hana (Mémento Mori)"	Mr. Children	
April 29	"Hana (Mémento Mori)"	Mr. Children	
May 6	"Anata ni Aitakute (Missing You)"	Seiko Matsuda	
May 13	"Cherry"	Spitz	
May 20	"Kokoro o hiraite"	Zard	
May 27	"Real Thing Shakes"	B'z	
June 3	"Ai no Kotodama (Spiritual Message)"	Southern All Stars	
June 10	"Beat Your Heart"	V6	
June 17	"You're My Sunshine"	Namie Amuro	
June 24	"You're My Sunshine"	Namie Amuro	
July 1	"La La La Love Song"	Toshinobu Kubota with Naomi Campbell	
July 8	"Stay"	Kyosuke Himuro	
July 15	"Ai no Kotodama (Spiritual Message)"	Southern All Stars	
July 22	"Forever Love"	X Japan	
July 29	"Aoi inazuma"	SMAP	
August 5	"Namida no kage"	Sharam Q	
August 12	"Atsuku nare"	Maki Oguro	
August 19	"Machine gun or buppanase"	Mr. Children	
August 26	"Squall"	Kyosuke Himuro	
September 2	"Another Orion"	Fumiya Fujii	
September 9	"Is this love"	Globe	
September 16	"Another Orion"	Fumiya Fujii	
September 23	"Nagisa"	Spitz	
September 30	"Take me Higher"	V6	
October 7	"Swallowtail Butterfly"	Yen Town Band	
October 14	"Save Your Dream"	Tomomi Kahara	
October 21	"Kore ga Watashi no Ikiru Michi"	Puffy	
October 28	"Kore ga Watashi no Ikiru Michi"	Puffy	
November 4	"Kore ga Watashi no Ikiru Michi"	Puffy	
November 11	"Can't Stop Fallin' in Love"	Globe	
November 18	"Pride"	Miki Imai	
November 25	"Can't Stop Fallin' in Love"	Globe	
December 2	"Shake"	SMAP	
December 9	"A Walk in the Park"	Namie Amuro	
December 16	"Yes"	My Little Lover	
December 23	"Pride"	Miki Imai	
December 30	"Pride"	Miki Imai	
