= List of awards and nominations received by Namie Amuro =

Namie Amuro awards and nominations
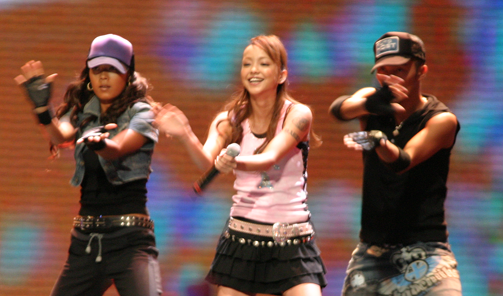
- Amuro at the 2005 MTV Asia Awards in Bangkok
Awards and nominations
Award	Wins	Nominations

Totals (Note: Certain award groups do not simply award one winner. They acknowledge several different recipients, have runners-up, and have third place. Since this is a specific recognition and is different from losing an award, runner-up mentions are considered wins in this award tally. For simplification and to avoid errors, each award in this list has been presumed to have had a prior nomination.)
- Wins: 89
- Nominations: 114

Japanese recording artist Namie Amuro has won numerous awards throughout her career, including 18 Japan Gold Disc Awards, 10 Japan Record Awards, 14 MTV Video Music Awards Japan and 6 Space Shower Music Awards.

== Awards and nominations ==
Name of award ceremony, year presented, award category, nominee of award, and result of nomination
Award ceremony	Year	Category	Nominee(s) / Work(s)	Result	Ref.
All Japan Cable Broadcasting Awards	1999	Yoshida Tadashi Award	"Something 'Bout The Kiss"	Won	
All Japan Cable Broadcasting Awards	2000	Grand Millennium Special Award	"Never End"	Won	
Asia Association Music Prize Awards	2005	Album of the Year	Queen of Hip-Pop	Nominated	
Asia Association Music Prize Awards	2007	Album of the Year	Play	Nominated	
Asia Association Music Prize Awards	2010	Album of the Year	Past Future	Nominated	
Association of Media in Digital Awards	2018	Excellence Award	Finally	Won	
Best Dresser Awards	1996	Female Category Musician	Namie Amuro	Won	
Billboard Japan Music Awards	2012	Top Pop Artist	Namie Amuro	Won	
CD Shop Awards	2018	Special Prize	Finally	Won	
CD Shop Awards	2019	Special Prize	Namie Amuro Final Tour 2018 ~Finally~	Won	
Design Awards Asia	2015	DOTD	"Anything"	Won	
Design Awards Asia	2015	DOTM	"Golden Touch"	Won	
FWA Design Awards	2015	Design Award	"Anything"	Won	
Golden Arrow Awards	1996	Best Music Award	Namie Amuro	Won	
Japan Blu-ray Awards	2019	Grand Prix	Namie Amuro Final Tour 2018 ~Finally~	Won	
Japan Blu-ray Awards	2019	Music Award	Namie Amuro Final Tour 2018 ~Finally~	Won	
Japan Cable Awards	1995	Best Request Award	"Try Me (Watashi o Shinjite)"	Won	
Japan Cable Awards	1996	Yomiuri Shimbun TV Special Award	"Don't Wanna Cry"	Won	
Japan Cable Awards	1996	Yomiuri Shimbun TV Special Award	"Sweet 19 Blues"	Won	
Japan Gold Disc Awards	1997	Artist of the Year	Namie Amuro	Won	
Japan Gold Disc Awards	1997	Best 5 Artists	Namie Amuro	Won	
Japan Gold Disc Awards	1997	Best 5 Songs	"Don't Wanna Cry"	Won	
Japan Gold Disc Awards	1997	Best Music Video	First Anniversary Live 1996 in Marine Stadium	Won	
Japan Gold Disc Awards	1998	Song of the Year	"Can You Celebrate?"	Won	
Japan Gold Disc Awards	1998	Pop Album of the Year	Concentration 20	Won	
Japan Gold Disc Awards	1999	Pop Album of the Year	181920	Won	
Japan Gold Disc Awards	2009	Best 10 Albums	Best Fiction	Won	
Japan Gold Disc Awards	2013	Song of the Year by Download (Asia)	"Love Story"	Won	
Japan Gold Disc Awards	2013	Best 5 Songs by Download	"Love Story"	Won	
Japan Gold Disc Awards	2014	Best Music Video	5 Major Domes Tour 2012 ~20th Anniversary Best~	Won	
Japan Gold Disc Awards	2015	Best 5 Albums	Ballada	Won	
Japan Gold Disc Awards	2017	Best 5 Songs by Download	"Hero"	Won	
Japan Gold Disc Awards	2018	Artist of the Year	Namie Amuro	Won	
Japan Gold Disc Awards	2018	Album of the Year	Finally	Won	
Japan Gold Disc Awards	2018	Best 5 Albums	Finally	Won	
Japan Gold Disc Awards	2019	Artist of the Year	Namie Amuro	Won	
Japan Gold Disc Awards	2019	Best Music Video	Namie Amuro Final Tour 2018 ~Finally~	Won	
Japan Jewelry Best Dresser Awards	2000	Female Award	Namie Amuro	Won	
Japan Record Awards	1995	Excellence Award	"Try Me (Watashi o Shinjite)"	Won	
Japan Record Awards	1996	Grand Prize	"Don't Wanna Cry"	Won	
Japan Record Awards	1996	Excellence Award	"Don't Wanna Cry"	Won	
Japan Record Awards	1996	Best Album Award	Sweet 19 Blues	Won	
Japan Record Awards	1997	Grand Prize	"Can You Celebrate?"	Won	
Japan Record Awards	1997	Excellence Award	"Can You Celebrate?"	Won	
Japan Record Awards	2000	Special Award	"Never End"	Won	
Japan Record Awards	2008	Excellence Award	Best Fiction	Won	
Japan Record Awards	2008	Best Album Award	Best Fiction	Won	
Japan Record Awards	2017	Special Award	Namie Amuro	Won	
Japan Wired Awards	1995	Excellence Award	"Try Me (Watashi o Shinjite)"	Won	
Japan Wired Awards	1996	Excellence Award	"Sweet 19 Blues"	Won	
JASRAC Awards	2019	Best 10 Domestic Works	"Can You Celebrate?"	Won	
JASRAC Awards	2019	Best 10 Domestic Works	"Never End"	Won	
JASRAC Awards	2019	Best 10 Domestic Works	"Hero"	Won	
JASRAC Awards	2019	Gold Award	"Hero"	Won	
MTV Europe Music Awards	2014	Best Japanese Act	Namie Amuro	Nominated	
MTV Student Voice Awards	2007	Student Voice Respect Award	Namie Amuro	Won	
MTV Video Music Awards Japan	2002	Inspiration Award Japan	Namie Amuro	Won	
MTV Video Music Awards Japan	2003	Best Collaboration	"Good Life" (as part of Suite Chic)	Won	
MTV Video Music Awards Japan	2004	Best R&B Video	"Put 'Em Up"	Won	
MTV Video Music Awards Japan	2004	Best Buzz Asia from Japan	"Put 'Em Up"	Won	
MTV Video Music Awards Japan	2005	Video of the Year	"Girl Talk"	Nominated	
MTV Video Music Awards Japan	2005	Best R&B Video	"Girl Talk"	Won	
MTV Video Music Awards Japan	2005	Most Impressive Performing Asian Artist	Namie Amuro	Won	
MTV Video Music Awards Japan	2006	Best Female Video	"WoWa"	Nominated	
MTV Video Music Awards Japan	2008	Best R&B Video	"Hide and Seek"	Won	
MTV Video Music Awards Japan	2009	Video of the Year	"New Look"	Nominated	
MTV Video Music Awards Japan	2009	Best Female Video	"New Look"	Won	
MTV Video Music Awards Japan	2009	Best R&B Video	"Sexy Girl"	Won	
MTV Video Music Awards Japan	2010	Best Female Video	"Fast Car"	Won	
MTV Video Music Awards Japan	2010	Video of the Year	"Fast Car"	Nominated	
MTV Video Music Awards Japan	2010	Album of the Year	Past < Future	Nominated	
MTV Video Music Awards Japan	2012	Best Female Video	"Love Story"	Won	
MTV Video Music Awards Japan	2012	Best Collaboration Video	"Make It Happen" (featuring After School)	Won	
MTV Video Music Awards Japan	2012	Best Pop Video	"Naked"	Nominated	
MTV Video Music Awards Japan	2013	Video of the Year	"In The Spotlight (Tokyo)"	Nominated	
MTV Video Music Awards Japan	2013	Best R&B Video	"In The Spotlight (Tokyo)"	Nominated	
MTV Video Music Awards Japan	2014	Video of the Year	"Ballerina"	Nominated	
MTV Video Music Awards Japan	2014	Best Female Video	"Ballerina"	Nominated	
MTV Video Music Awards Japan	2015	Video of the Year	"Birthday"	Nominated	
MTV Video Music Awards Japan	2015	Best Female Video – Japan	"Birthday"	Won	
MTV Video Music Awards Japan	2015	Best Creativity	Namie Amuro	Won	
MTV Video Music Awards Japan	2016	Best Female Video	"Mint"	Nominated	
NexTone Awards	2019	Gold Award	"In Two"	Won	
RTHK International Pop Poll Awards	2010	Top Japanese Gold Songs	"Fast Car"	Bronze	
RTHK International Pop Poll Awards	2010	Top Japanese Artist / Group	Namie Amuro	Silver	
RTHK International Pop Poll Awards	2015	Top Japanese Gold Songs	"Grotesque"	Silver	
RTHK International Pop Poll Awards	2015	Top Japanese Artist / Group	Namie Amuro	Bronze	
RTHK International Pop Poll Awards	2016	Top Japanese Gold Songs	"Golden Touch"	Silver	
RTHK International Pop Poll Awards	2016	Top Japanese Artist / Group	Namie Amuro	Bronze	
RTHK International Pop Poll Awards	2017	Top Japanese Gold Songs	"Hero"	Bronze	
RTHK International Pop Poll Awards	2017	Top Japanese Artist / Group	Namie Amuro	Silver	
RTHK International Pop Poll Awards	2018	Best Selling Album	Finally	Won	
RTHK International Pop Poll Awards	2018	Top Japanese Gold Songs	"Finally"	Silver	
RTHK International Pop Poll Awards	2018	Top Japanese Artist / Group	Namie Amuro	Gold	
RTHK International Pop Poll Awards	2019	Top Japanese Gold Songs	"Showtime"	Bronze	
RTHK International Pop Poll Awards	2019	Top Japanese Artist / Group	Namie Amuro	Silver	
Space Shower Music Awards	2004	Best R&B Video	"Put 'Em Up"	Nominated	
Space Shower Music Awards	2004	Best Your Choice	"Put 'Em Up"	Nominated	
Space Shower Music Awards	2008	Best Female Video	"Hide and Seek"	Won	
Space Shower Music Awards	2009	Best Artist	Namie Amuro	Won	
Space Shower Music Awards	2009	Best Female Video	"New Look"	Won	
Space Shower Music Awards	2010	Best Video of the Year	"Fast Car"	Won	
Space Shower Music Awards	2010	Best Art Direction	"Fast Car"	Won	
Space Shower Music Awards	2016	Best Female Artist	Namie Amuro	Nominated	
Space Shower Music Awards	2018	Best Female Artist	Namie Amuro	Won	
Spike Asia Awards	2015	Best Innovative Integration Bronze Award	"Anything"	Won	
World Music Awards	1997	Best Selling Japanese Artist of the Year	Namie Amuro	Won	
World Music Awards	2010	Best Asian Artist	Namie Amuro	Won	
World Music Awards	2012	World's Best Album	Uncontrolled	Nominated	
World Music Awards	2012	World's Best Female Artist	Namie Amuro	Nominated	
World Music Awards	2012	World's Best Video	"In The Spotlight (Tokyo)"	Nominated	
World Music Awards	2014	World's Best Album	Feel	Nominated	
World Music Awards	2014	World's Best Song	"Big Boys Cry"	Nominated	
World Music Awards	2014	World's Best Video	"Big Boys Cry"	Nominated	
World Music Awards	2014	World's Best Female Artist	Namie Amuro	Nominated	
World Music Awards	2014	World's Best Entertainer	Namie Amuro	Nominated	
World Music Awards	2014	World's Best Live Act	Namie Amuro	Nominated	

== State honors ==
Name of country, year given, and name of honor
Country	Year	Honor	Ref.
Japan	2000	Naha City Honorary Citizen Award	
Japan	2018	Okinawa Prefecture's National Honor Award	
