= List of best-selling singles in 1996 (Japan) =

This is a list of the best-selling singles in 1996 in Japan, as reported by Oricon.

Ranking	Single	Artist	Release	Sales
1	"Namonaki Uta"	Mr. Children	February 5, 1996	2,303,000
2	"Departures"	Globe	January 1, 1996	2,272,000
3	"La La La Love Song"	Toshinobu Kubota with Naomi Campbell	May 13, 1996	1,613,000
4	"Cherry"	Spitz	April 10, 1996	1,539,000
5	"Hana (Mémento Mori)"	Mr. Children	April 10, 1996	1,539,000
6	"Sora mo Toberuhazu"	Spitz	April 25, 1994	1,432,000
7	"Ai no Kotodama (Spiritual Message)"	Southern All Stars	May 20, 1996	1,381,000
8	"I'm Proud"	Tomomi Kahara	March 6, 1996	1,372,000
9	"Don't Wanna Cry"	Namie Amuro	March 13, 1996	1,372,000
10	"Chase the Chance"	Namie Amuro	December 4, 1995	1,362,000
11	"Mienai Chikara (Invisible One)/Move"	B'z	March 6, 1996	1,236,000
12	"Real Thing Shakes"	B'z	May 15, 1996	1,140,000
13	"You're My Sunshine"	Namie Amuro	June 5, 1996	1,098,000
14	"Anata ni Aitakute (Missing You)"	Seiko Matsuda	April 22, 1996	1,089,000
15	"Asia no Junshin"	Puffy	May 13, 1996	1,057,000
16	"Kore ga Watashi no Ikiru Michi"	Puffy	October 7, 1996	1,057,000
17	"Alice"	My Little Lover	April 22, 1996	1,033,000
18	"Sobakasu"	Judy and Mary	February 19, 1996	1,030,000
19	"My Friend"	Zard	January 8, 1996	1,000,000
20	"To Love You More"	Celine Dion with Kryzler & Kpmpany	October 21, 1995	999,000
