= Sweet 19 Blues =

- Standard edition slipcase artwork. Utilized for its 2012 reissue and subsequent digital release.

Studio album by Namie Amuro
- Released: July 22, 1996
- Recorded: 1995–1996
- Studio: TK Sequence Studios (Tokyo); Woodstock Karuizawa Studios (Tokyo); Artworks Studio (Tokyo); Baybridge Studio (Tokyo); Heart Beat Recording Studio (Tokyo); Image Recording Inc. (Tokyo); Paradise Studio Komazaw (Tokyo); Prime-Mix Studio (Tokyo); Onkio Haus (Tokyo); Record Plant Studios (Los Angeles); Sound Chamber (New York City)
- Genre: Dance-pop; acid house
- Length: 66:46
- Language: Japanese; English
- Label: Avex Trax
- Producer: Tetsuya Komuro

Namie Amuro chronology
Dance Tracks Vol.1 (1995)	Sweet 19 Blues (1996)	Original Tracks Vol.1 (1996)

Singles from Sweet 19 Blues
- 1. "Body Feels Exit" Released: October 25, 1995; 2. "Chase the Chance" Released: December 4, 1995; 3. "Don't Wanna Cry" Released: March 13, 1996; 4. "You're My Sunshine" Released: June 5, 1996; 5. "Sweet 19 Blues" Released: August 21, 1996

Sweet 19 Blues (stylized in all caps) is the second studio album by Japanese singer Namie Amuro. It was released through Avex Trax on July 22, 1996. It is Amuro's first release with the label since leaving Toshiba-EMI, as well as her first album free of material associated with her previous band, Super Monkey's. Sweet 19 Blues was solely produced by Tetsuya Komuro and features a diverse group of collaborators, including Cozy Kubo, Akio Togashi, Takahiro Maeda, M.c.A.T, and Randy Waldman.

Sweet 19 Blues showcases popular music genres from the 1990s, including pop, dance, R&B, jazz, blues, and eurobeat. The record was noted for taking influence from contemporary African-American music, particularly the work of Janet Jackson, SWV, and Total. Its singles were rearranged for inclusion on the album, and spliced with interludes. Lyrically, Sweet 19 Blues revolves around romance and young womanhood, and is seen as a transition from Amuro's Japanese idol image.

Music critics gave Sweet 19 Blues positive reviews, praising the album's themes, overall sound, and production quality, while some were divided over Amuro's vocal performance. In addition, Amuro and the album received numerous nominations and awards. Commercially, the album was a huge success, reaching number one on the Oricon Albums Chart and earning a triple million certification from the Recording Industry Association of Japan (RIAJ) for selling over three million copies. Sweet 19 Blues was briefly the top-selling album by a solo artist, and one of the most successful releases in Japanese music history.

Sweet 19 Blues spawned five singles, all of which were commercially successful in Japan, with some ranking among the best-selling singles of 1996. In addition, several tracks from the album were used as commercial themes for various advertising campaigns across Japan. Amuro promoted the album through live appearances, which appeared on the VHS release, Namie Amuro World. She also embarked on her First Anniversary tour, which a live release was distributed in December. In retrospect, publications have regarded Sweet 19 Blues as a pivotal moment in Japanese music history, owing to Amuro's trendsetting fashion style and departure from Japanese idol culture.

== Background ==
In the early 1990s, Amuro began her music career in her native Okinawa with the Toshiba-EMI idol group Super Monkey's, who made their move to Tokyo in 1993. Although the group's singles were not commercially successful, Amuro began to receive media attention for her work as an aspiring actress and model. They changed their name to Namie Amuro with Super Monkey's as a result, and released two singles under this iteration, including the breakthrough "Try Me (Watashi o Shinjite)" in January 1995. Their final two singles, "Taiyou no Season" and "Stop the Music", were primarily billed to Amuro, with Super Monkey's appearing on the back covers.

Amuro's debut studio album, Dance Tracks Vol. 1, was released on October 16, 1995, under Toshiba-EMI, while her Avex Trax debut single "Body Feels Exit" followed nine days later. The other members of Super Monkey's reformed as MAX under the new label months prior. Dance Tracks Vol. 1 was solely billed to Amuro and includes re-worked versions of each Super Monkey's single. The material in their original form later appears on the group's only compilation album Original Tracks Vol. 1 (1996), fully credited to Namie Amuro with Super Monkey's. Amuro's debut was a commercial success, topping the charts and selling more than a million units.

== Development and production ==
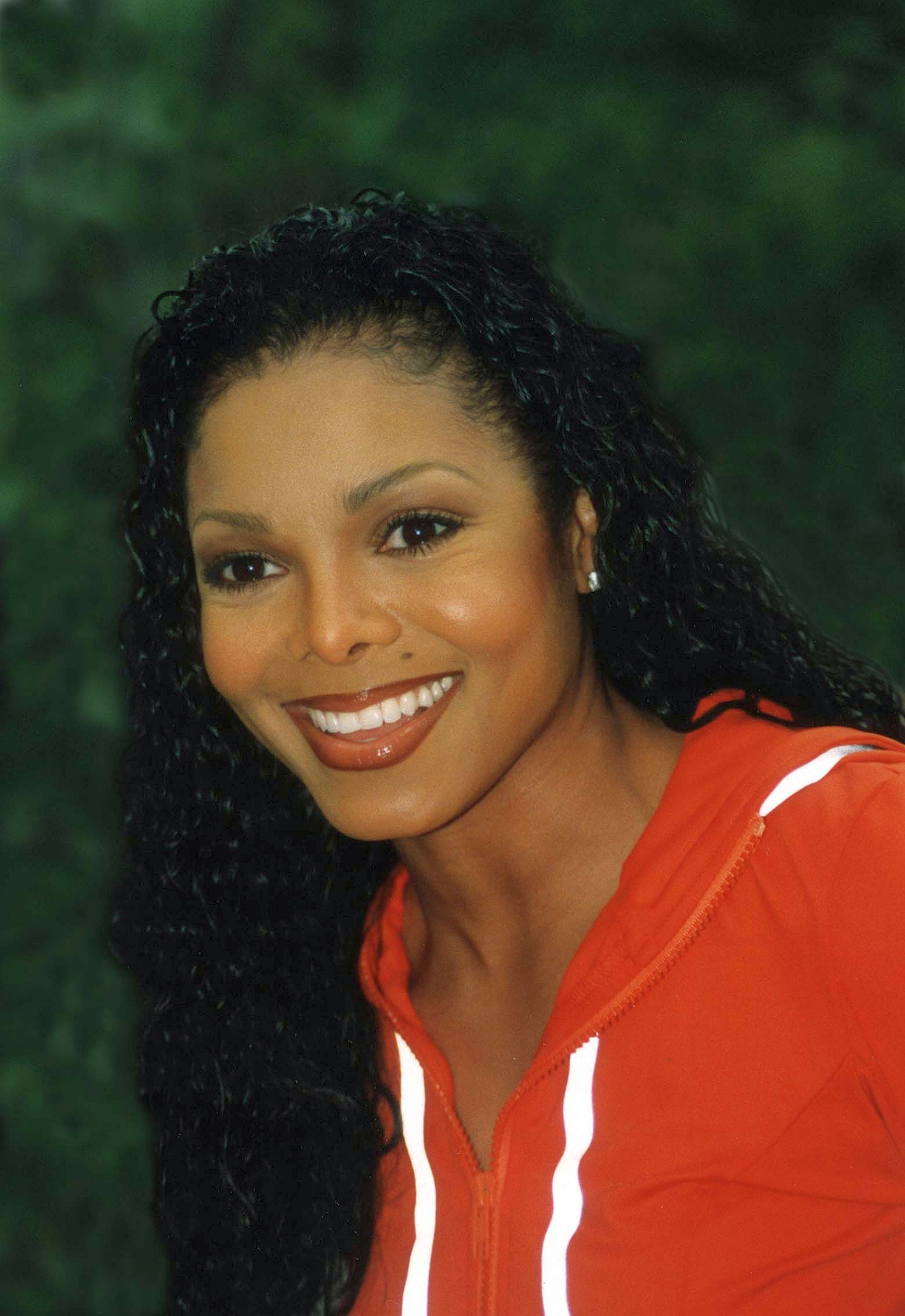
American singer Janet Jackson (pictured) was one of many influences to the album.

After leaving Toshiba-EMI and signing with Avex Trax in 1995, Amuro started working on new music. Avex Trax hired Tetsuya Komuro, who previously worked with Amuro while she was with Super Monkey's. Sweet 19 Blues featured a diverse cast of collaborators and composers, including Cozy Kubo, Akio Togashi, Takahiro Maeda, M.c.A.T, and Randy Waldman. Komuro worked on Sweet 19 Blues while also recording his debut album with Japanese band Globe, which was finished around the same time as Amuro's album.

Throughout the process, Amuro and her team were influenced by African-American music and artists from the 1990s, particularly Janet Jackson, TLC, and the Fugees, whom Amuro admired musically, as well as the notable success of girl groups SWV and Total. She wanted to incorporate these artists and influences into her own music and market it in Japan, where she was popular with the younger generation. Aside from that, the majority of the album's themes were inspired by Amuro's daily life, which she believed could inspire women of the same age in Japan through her music.

"Body Feels Exit" was one of the first recorded songs, released as a single in October 1995. The track features an uptempo dance and eurobeat sound that was common in Komuro's collaborations with other artists at the time. Three additional singles were released during the album's production: "Chase the Chance", "Don't Wanna Cry", and "You're My Sunshine", all of which echoed similar dance-oriented elements. However, Komuro chose to rework each single for the album. To complete this, he invited several musicians and management personnel to his private studio to work on it. During the sessions, he wrote several songs that would appear on the parent album.

Amuro recorded her vocals in various studios in Tokyo. During studio sessions, only Amuro, Komuro, and the director in charge were present. Amuro would usually enter the studio session without having read the lyrics and would receive them upon arrival. Her team believed that if she had received them before these sessions, the outcome could have been different. Amuro and her team would frequently finish a song per day and record it once, unless they were dissatisfied with the outcome. After finishing the album, Keith "KC" Cohen mixed it at Avaco Creative Studios and Studio Inn Studios.

== Composition and content ==
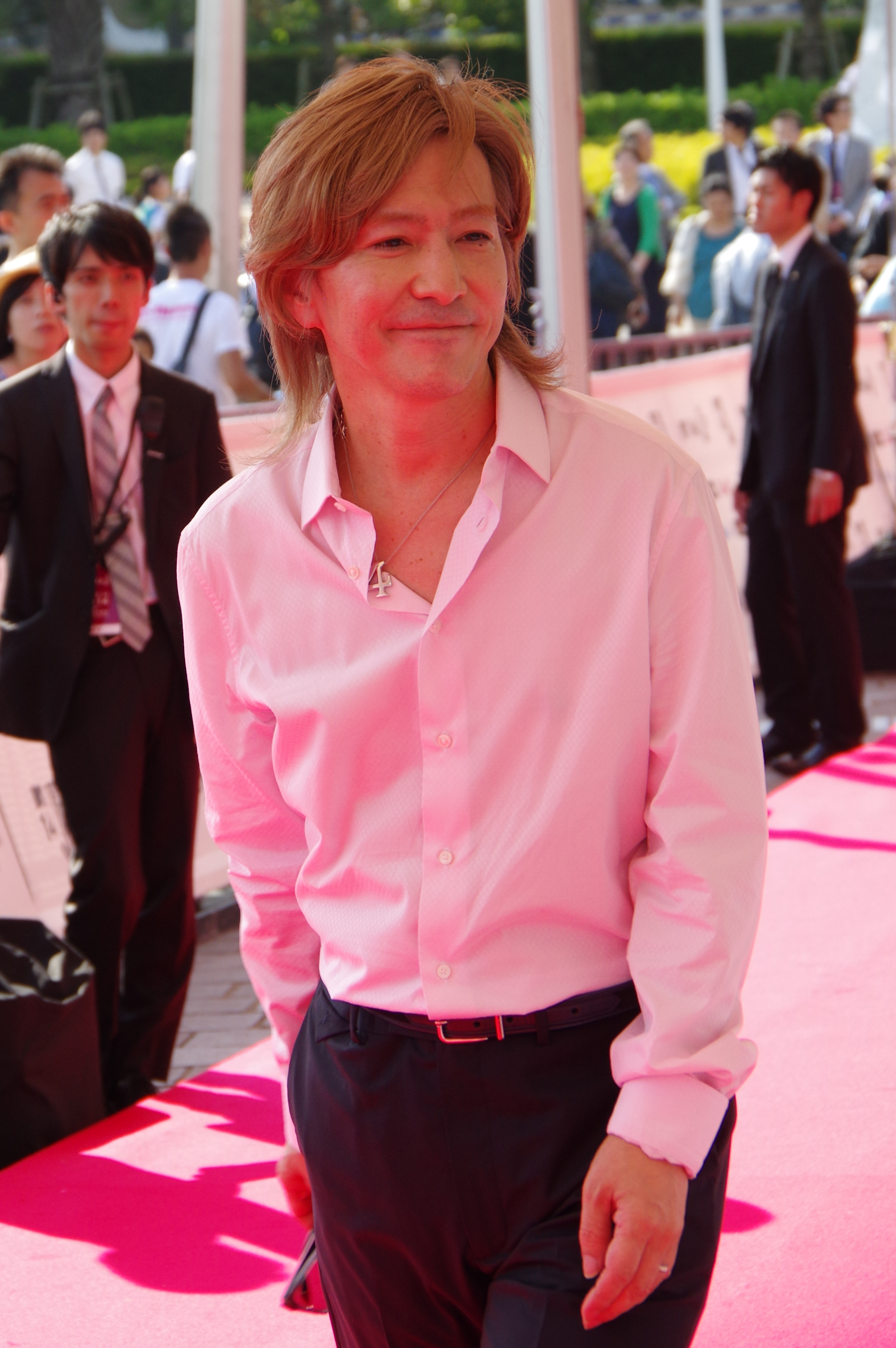
Japanese producer Tetsuya Komuro (pictured) crafted majority of the material for Sweet 19 Blues.

Sweet 19 Blues consists of 19 songs: 11 full-length recordings and eight interludes with instrumental or vocal sections. Musically, the album incorporates a wide range of popular music styles and genres from the 1990s, including pop, dance, R&B, jazz, blues, and eurobeat. According to AllMusic, the album "typified the songwriting and production values of Komuro-namely, a highly polished dance-pop sound characterised by disco rhythms and funky basslines." According to Ted Mills of the same publication, the album includes "some slinky dance numbers that could have been singles in their own right," as well as re-works of "Body Feels Exit," "Chase the Chance," "Don't Wanna Cry," and "You're My Sunshine" with remixes, new arrangements, or extended jams."

The album's first interlude, "Watch Your Step," features Amuro saying the title in acapella. "Motion" is a 51-second composition of humming. "Let's Do the Motion" is the album's first full-length track, featuring rapping by Amuro and Komuro. Takahiro Maeda, the song's songwriter, said the lyrics were metaphorical political references. "Private" was one of the first songs written for the album, and draws inspiration from R&B and African-American music, and includes a rap by Amuro. Komuro sent Maeda a demo recording of himself scat rapping and asked him to provide additional lyrics for "Private". He found the process challenging due to the simplicity of the singing lyrics and the difficulty of the rap, so he wrote the lyrics as a short story instead.

Randy Waldman composed the interlude "Ocean Way," which lasts more than one minute. The rework of "Don't Wanna Cry" features a groovy blues-inspired sound with piano riffs and replaces the original composition's bass guitars with various live instruments. The lyrics have a darker undertone, and Maeda had to slightly revise them after being told they were too heavy for Amuro. "Rainy Dance" is an R&B song inspired by Maeda's dislike for rainy days, but had thought rainy sounds could influence the rhythm of a song for Amuro. The CC Mix of "Chase the Chance" replaces the original sound with a band-oriented sound that incorporates live instrumentation.

"Joy" is an interlude that includes rapping by Amuro and uncredited artist M.c.A.T It was re-worked as a single released by the latter artist under the title "Thunder Party", which featured Amuro as a featured artist. "I'll Jump" is an R&B song with influences from 1970s jazz and soul music. "Scratch Voices" is a four-second interlude that transitions into "I Was a Fool," which sounds similar to "I'll Jump." The demo version was initially performed in English before Maeda translated it to Japanese. "Present" is a re-work of the same-titled song, which was released as a B-side to "Don't Wanna Cry"; both versions were considered sequels to "Don't Wanna Cry".

The interlude "Don't Wanna Cry (Symphonic Style)" lasts one minute and 24 seconds. The Hollywood remix of "You're My Sunshine" and the Latin House remix of "Body Feels Exit" both featured Latin music. The interlude "77~" spans one minute and 45 seconds. The title track is the album's final full-length recording, replacing guitar riffs by Kazuhiro Matsuo with Michael Thompson. The songwriting process took longer than expected, but Komuro felt it accurately represented Amuro. The lyrics explore Amuro's feelings about leaving her youth behind. The song was produced simultaneously with Globe's "Is this love" in late May 1996. The concept of the two songs share a common theme: "a girl who stopped baring her belly button and wearing a mini-skirt and started wearing pants" and "a girl who hides her body and tries to show her inner self." The album concludes with the interlude "Soon Nineteen," in which Amuro recites lyrics from the previous track.

== Release and artwork ==
Sweet 19 Blues was first promoted on July 20, 1996, and then widely distributed in Japan by Avex Trax two days later on July 22. A standard CD was issued in a standard jewelcase, while four limited edition slipcase versions featured four different photographs of Amuro. Each limited edition format was printed one million times. In October, the standard format was distributed in Hong Kong and Taiwan, while a cassette tape with alternative artwork was released in Hong Kong and Indonesia in 1996. Sweet 19 Blues was reissued in Taiwan in 1999 with a limited edition slipcase and 24-bit gold disc. In 2012, the original format was re-issued to commemorate Amuro's 20th career anniversary in the entertainment business.

The album artwork was photographed by Itaru Hirama, with Tycoon Graphics in Tokyo, Japan, designing its booklet. Komuro requested that Amuro take several photos for the album without hair or makeup to highlight her natural side. Shot in black and white, the photography style was a deliberate departure from the blue and white color scheme utilized on the "Body Feels Exit" single cover. Wearing a dress and high heels, Komuro stated that Amuro had an insecurity about her bare feet and found that the monochrome was "a good way to offset [this], and not make the photos look sexy".

Komuro was impressed with the finished work and contacted Avex Trax's upper management to have different artworks for the album printed, resulting in four limited slipcase editions. A fifth and sixth version were scheduled to be released, but the plan was later abandoned. In a retrospective interview with Spur magazine, Annie Fuku compared the photographs to the work of English model Kate Moss from the same period, to which Komuro referenced her Calvin Klein ads, which were also monochrome, "a bit decadent and not at all vulgar."

Mills explains that the album's name, Sweet 19 Blues, refers to the "melancholic passing of another sweet year of youth."

== Promotion ==
=== Singles and other songs ===
Sweet 19 Blues spawned five singles, all in their original form. "Body Feels Exit" was the album's lead single, which was distributed on mini CD and vinyl. It was the commercial theme for Japan's Taito X-55 karaoke video game system. The song achieved success in Japan, reaching number three on the Oricon Singles Chart and receiving a platinum certification from the Recording Industry Association of Japan (RIAJ) for sales of over 400,000 units. "Chase the Chance" was released on December 4, along with several remixes of the song. It was used as the theme song for the Japanese television drama The Chef. It was success in Japan, becoming Amuro's first number one single on the Oricon Singles Chart and her first single to sell more than one million copies in the country.

"Don't Wanna Cry" was released on March 13, 1996, and served as the commercial theme for the Japanese beverage company DyDo Drinks. It was a success in Japan, reaching number one on the Oricon Singles Chart and was certified triple platinum by the RIAJ for shipments of over 1.2 million units. "You're My Sunshine" was released on June 5, along with additional remixes of the song. It was a commercial success in Japan, reaching number one on the Oricon Singles Chart and becoming her final million-selling single from the album.

The title track was the album's final single, released on August 21, 1996. It served as the theme song for the 1996 Japanese comedy film That's Cunning! Shijō Saidai no Sakusen?, which also featured Amuro. It was a commercial success in Japan, reaching number two on the Oricon Singles Chart and was certified platinum by the RIAJ for sales of over 400,000 units. In addition to the singles, several album tracks were used as commercial themes in Japanese campaigns, including "Private" for Nissan, "I'll Jump" for DyDo Drinks, and "Joy" for Maxwell.

=== Live appearances and tours ===
First Anniversary Live
- Tour by Namie Amuro
- Associated album: Sweet 19 Blues
- Start date: August 27, 1996
- End date: September 1, 1996
- Legs: 1
- No. of shows: 4

Namie Amuro concert chronology
- First Anniversary Live (1996); Concentration 20 Tour (1997)

Amuro promoted the album with a series of live performances and appearances throughout Japan. She performed songs from Sweet 19 Blues at a Nippon Budokan event before heading to Tokyo for the album's live release party. Amuro's VHS release, Namie Amuro World (1996), included footage of these events and a birthday montage in Jamaica and New York City. In addition, a re-issue titled Namie Amuro: Chase the Chance 19 Memories included excerpts from various concert dates between March and May 1996; the excepts were taken from her concert tour with Super Monkey's.

In August of that year, Amuro embarked on a four-date tour called Namie Amuro First Anniversary to commemorate her first year as a solo artist. The tour setlist included songs from Sweet 19 Blues and previous recordings. Snippets from her August 31 and September 1 shows at the Chiba Marine Stadium were added on Namie Amuro World. Subsequently, a live release titled First Anniversary Live 1996 in Marine Stadium was released on December 4, 1996 on VHS, followed by additional formats on later dates. The live release performed moderately in Japan, reaching number 18 on the Oricon DVD chart.

First Anniversary Live set list
1. Opening (includes elements of "Let's Do the Motion")
2. "Try Me (Watashi o Shinjite)"
3. "Taiyou no Season"
4. "Heart ni Hi wo Tsukete"
5. "Aishite Muscat"
6. "Dancing Junk" (featuring rap by Sheila E.)
7. "Rainy Dance"
8. "I Was a Fool"
9. "Private"
10. "Don't Wanna Cry"
11. "I'll Jump"
12. "Joy" (with m.c.A • T)
13. "Body Feels Exit"
14. "Let's Do the Motion"
15. "You're My Sunshine"
16. "Chase the Chance"

Encore

17. "Go! Go! (Yume no Hayasade)"
18. "Stop the Music"
19. "Get My Shinin'"
20. "Sweet 19 Blues" (with Tetsuya Komuro)

Tour dates
Date (1996)	City	Country	Venue	Attendance
August 27	Ginowan	Japan	Ginowan Seaside Park	—
August 28	Ginowan	Japan	Ginowan Seaside Park	—
August 31	Chiba	Japan	Chiba Marine Stadium	—
September 1	Chiba	Japan	Chiba Marine Stadium	—

== Critical reception ==
Professional ratings
Review scores
Source	Rating
AllMusic	3.5/5 stars
CDJournal	(positive)

Music critics complimented Sweet 19 Blues. Ted Mills of AllMusic gave the record three and a half stars out of five, praising producer Tetsuya Komuro's contributions to the remixes and musical expansions on a "brilliantly produced pop album." Mills emphasised that Komuro's intention to remix the majority of the content "came as a shock" to the Japanese public. Despite his reservations about Amuro's "limited[ed]" vocal abilities, he concluded that "Listenable and danceable, from beginning to end, any 19-year-old pop wunderkind couldn't ask for anything more... and secured a place in J-Pop history." In a 1996 review, Yuichi Hirayama, writing for What's In magazine, said that the "melodious Eurobeat" of the tracks emphasized Amuro's voice well, and praised her rapping skills on the track "Private". He found the English lyrics in the songs to be "forced", but praised the Japanese lyrics, saying they showed "a different side" of Amuro.

Japanese magazine CDJournal felt Amuro's "surreal" and "poet[ic]" songwriting, as well as her image shift from a typical Japanese idol, was a successful turning point in her career. OKMusic editor Tomoyuki Hokari praised Amuro's singing abilities, Komuro's involvement, and the album's overall sound, calling it a "historical masterpiece". In 2015, the Japanese website Goo conducted a survey to determine which of Amuro's albums the Japanese public thought was her best; Sweet 19 Blues received the most votes, with over 1,600 votes in total.

Amuro's work on Sweet 19 Blues received numerous awards and recognition. At the 1996 Japan Record Awards, "Don't Wanna Cry" and "Sweet 19 Blues" received the Excellence Award, the album was named Best Album, and "Don't Wanna Cry" won the Grand Prize, making Amuro the youngest recipient in the latter category at the age of 19. At the 1997 Japan Gold Disc Awards, Amuro won Artist of the Year and was named one of the Top Five Best Artists, "Don't Wanna Cry" was named one of the Top Five Best Songs, and her First Anniversary Live 1996 in Marine Stadium won Best Music Video.

== Commercial performance ==
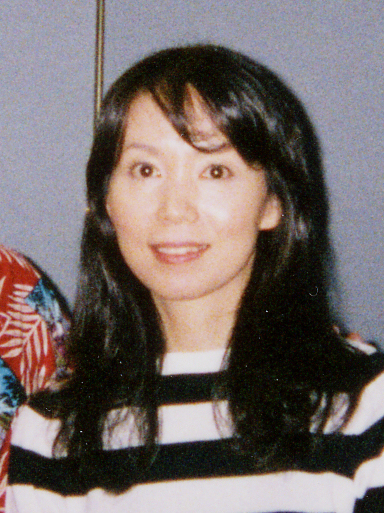
Sweet 19 Blues surpassed Impressions by Mariya Takeuchi (pictured) as the highest-selling record by a female artist.

Sweet 19 Blues was a commercial success throughout Asia. In Japan, the album debuted at the top of the Oricon Albums Chart, selling 1,921,850 copies in its first week. It remains Amuro's highest first-week sales to date, the first female act to sell over a million copies in a week, and the ninth fastest-selling album in the country overall. It stayed in the same position the following week, moving 352,950 units. Sweet 19 Blues spent 42 weeks on the charts and sold 3,186,860 copies, making it the second best-selling album of the year, trailing Globe's self-titled album. It was certified triple million by the RIAJ for exceeding shipments of three million units.

Sweet 19 Blues briefly became the best-selling album by a Japanese solo act and female artist, outselling Mariya Takeuchi's Impressions (1994), which sold 3,067,000 copies. However, it was replaced by Mariah Carey's 1998 greatest hits album Number 1's. It was the third-best-selling album at the time of its release, trailing only Globe and Mr. Children's Atomic Heart (1994), before being pushed lower by the release of Glay's greatest hits album Review (1997). It is currently the 14th best-selling album, the seventh best-selling studio release, and the seventh best-selling album by a female Japanese artist in the country.

After Amuro announced her retirement, Sweet 19 Blues debuted at number 13 on the Oricon Digital Chart, selling 766 digital copies. Despite not charting in other countries, it was reported to be popular throughout Asia. Several publications reported that the album sold more than three million copies in its first week throughout Asia. (Note: Several sources differ on the exact sales amount and whether sales were calculated in Japan or across Asia. According to all listed references, Sweet 19 Blues sold over three million units in its first week.) Sweet 19 Blues remain's Amuro's best-selling studio album and overall work.

== Impact ==
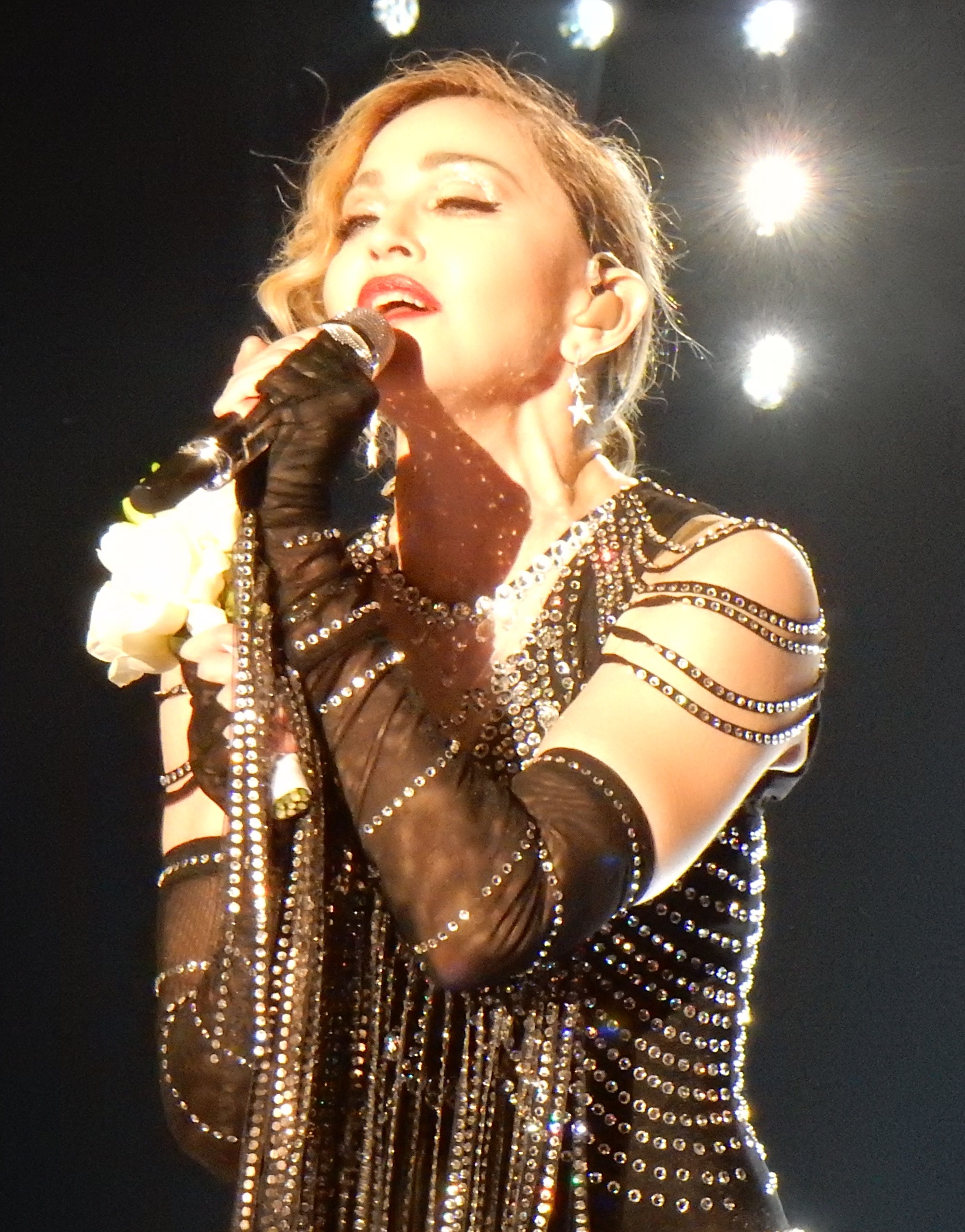
Amuro's unexpected rise to fame was compared to the similar experience of Madonna (pictured), with whom Amuro was frequently compared to throughout her career.

Sweet 19 Blues is regarded as an important moment in Japanese pop culture. According to the RIAJ, Amuro, along with the "Komuro family" of Komuro, Globe, Tomomi Kahara, and TRF, were the most "dominating" figures in the Japanese industry and music economy at the time, leading to higher sales percentages than the previous year. That same year, Billboard featured an article about Komuro, citing Amuro's single "Don't Wanna Cry" as a "good example of Komuro's good school of pop production." Mr. Miyoshi of Polygram told The New York Post, "Because of her [Amuro], all the other record companies in Japan are looking for their own idol singers to promote."

Journalists and commentators cited Amuro's fashion and style during the time as a trend for the Japanese public, and her fan base was dubbed "Amura". She rose to prominence in fashion magazines and the general press as a result of the traditional Japanese idol departure, which includes "dying their hair brown, plucking their brows... High heels, a miniskirt, and tattoos." As a result, critics observed that she stood out from her contemporaries and other idol singers. However, David W. Edgington, author of the novel Japan at the Millennium: Joining Past and Future, believed Amuro had changed the stereotype of idol culture, whereas writer Marwan Kraidy saw her as part of "Japan's rising cultural power" in the world.

Furthermore, an author from the United States-Japan Women's Centre believed the singer's success with Sweet 19 Blues was the reason many people looked to her as a role model from 1996 to 1997. Some commentators compared her unexpected success to that of Janet Jackson and Madonna, two artists who rose to prominence at a young age. These two artists, in particular, prompted the Western media to refer to Amuro as the "Queen of Japanese Pop" or the "Japanese Madonna".

== Track listing ==
No.	Title	Writer(s)	Producer(s)	Length
1.	"Watch Your Step!!"	Namie Amuro	Tetsuya Komuro	0:04
2.	"Motion"		Komuro	0:51
3.	"Let's Do The Motion"	Komuro; Takahiro Maeda	Komuro	4:08
4.	"Private"	Komuro; Maeda	Komuro	5:36
5.	"Ocean Way" (Interlude)		Randy Waldman	1:05
6.	"Don't Wanna Cry" (Eighteen's Summer Mix)	Komuro; Maeda	Komuro	5:40
7.	"Rainy Dance"	Maeda	Kubo	3:43
8.	"Chase the Chance" (CC Mix)	Komuro; Maeda	Komuro	4:39
9.	"Joy" (Interlude)	M.c.A・T	Togashi	1:20
10.	"I'll Jump"	Komuro	Komuro	5:19
11.	"Scratch Voices" (Interlude)	Amuro	Komuro	0:04
12.	"I Was a Fool"	Komuro; Maeda	Komuro	4:37
13.	"Present"	Maeda	Kubo	4:36
14.	"Don't Wanna Cry (Symphonic Style)" (Interlude)		Komuro	1:24
15.	"You're My Sunshine" (Hollywood Mix)	Komuro	Komuro	5:42
16.	"Body Feels Exit" (Latin House Mix)	Komuro	Komuro	8:52
17.	"'77~" (Interlude)		Kubo	1:45
18.	"Sweet 19 Blues"	Komuro	Komuro	5:39
19.	"...Soon Nineteen" (Interlude)	Komuro	Komuro	1:52
Total length:				66:46

== Credits and personnel ==
Credits adapted from the liner notes of Sweet 19 Blues.

Recording and management

- Recorded and mixed between at TK Sequence Studios, Woodstock Karuizawa Studios, Artworks Studio, Baybridge Studio, Heart Beat Recording Studio, Image Recording Inc., Paradise Studio Komazawa, Prime-Mix Studio, Onkio Haus (Tokyo, Japan); Record Plant Studios, Sound Chamber (Los Angeles, California, New York City, New York).

Personnel

- Namie Amuro – vocals, background vocals
- m.c.A.T – vocals
- Sheila E. – backing vocals, percussion
- Joey Johnson – backing vocals
- Lynn Mabry – background vocals
- Ricky Nelson – background vocals
- Tracey Whitney – background vocals
- Valerie Williams – background vocals
- Kinbara Chieko – strings
- Cozy Kubo – producer, keyboard, synthesizer
- Tetsuya Komuro – producer, backing vocals, keyboard, synthesizer
- Kazuhiro Matsuo – guitar
- Tatsuya Murayama – strings
- Raphael Padilla – percussions
- Michael Paulo – saxophone
- Neil Stubenhaus – bass guitar
- Michael Thompson – guitar
- Keith Cohen – arranger, mixing
- Akihiko Shimizu – vocal director
- Itaru Hirama – photographer
- Tycoon Graphics – art direction

== Charts ==
=== Weekly charts ===
Chart (1996)	Peak position
Japanese Albums (Oricon)	1
Taiwanese International Albums (IFPI)	2

=== Year-end charts ===
Chart (1996)	Position
Japanese Albums (Oricon)	2

=== Decade-end charts ===
Chart (1990–1999)	Position
Japanese Albums (Oricon)	9

=== All-time chart ===
Chart	Position
Japanese Albums (Oricon)	13

== Certifications and sales ==
Region	Certification	Certified units/sales
Japan (RIAJ)	3× Million	3,359,640

== Release history ==
Sweet 19 Blues release history
Region	Date	Format	Label	Ref(s).
Japan	July 20, 1996	Promotional CD	Avex Trax	
Japan	July 22, 1996	CD; limited edition CD	Avex Trax	
Hong Kong	1996	CD; cassette tape	Avex Trax	
Indonesia	1996	Cassette tape	Avex Trax	
Taiwan	1996	CD	Avex Trax	
Taiwan	1999	CD (re-issue)	Avex Trax	
Japan	2012	CD (re-issue)	Avex Trax	

== See also ==
- Digital Dance Mix Vol. 1 Namie Amuro, 1997 video game featuring two songs from the album
- List of best-selling albums in Japan
- List of best-selling singles in 1996 (Japan)
- List of Oricon number-one albums of 1996
