= List of Oricon number-one albums of 1996 =

These are the Oricon number one albums of 1996, per the Oricon Albums Chart.

== Chart history ==
Key
†	Indicates best-selling album of 1996

Issue Date	Album	Artist(s)
January 1	Beauty and Harmony	Miwa Yoshida
January 15	Back Beats #1	Maki Ohguro
January 22	Back Beats #1	Maki Ohguro
January 29	Back Beats #1	Maki Ohguro
February 5	Hey Man	Mr. Big
February 12	Banzai	Ulfuls
February 19	Beat Out!	Glay
February 26	Looking Back	Kazumasa Oda
March 4	The Live 3	TRF
March 11	King & Queen	Tomoyasu Hotei
March 18	King & Queen	Tomoyasu Hotei
March 25	Singles Collection +6	Wands
April 1	Daiginjō	Miyuki Nakajima
April 8	Globe †	Globe
April 15	Love Unlimited	Dreams Come True
April 22	Globe †	Globe
April 29	Globe †	Globe
May 6	Style	Luna Sea
May 13	Globe †	Globe
May 20	Globe †	Globe
May 27	Globe †	Globe
June 3	Neon Genesis Evangelion III	TV soundtrack
June 10	Fake Star	Kuroyume
June 17	Love Brace	Tomomi Kahala
June 24	Only Good Summer	Tube
July 1	Love Brace	Tomomi Kahala
July 8	Shinkai	Mr. Children
July 15	Red	Nanase Aikawa
July 22	Today Is Another Day	Zard
July 29	Young Love	Southern All Stars
August 5	Sweet 19 Blues	Namie Amuro
August 12	Sweet 19 Blues	Namie Amuro
August 19	Since 1995: Forever	V6
August 26	Smap 009	SMAP
September 2	Singles	T-Bolan
September 9	Singles	T-Bolan
September 16	Psyence	Hide
September 23	By Myself	Hitomi
September 30	Montage	Yen Town Band
October 7	Montage	Yen Town Band
October 14	Missing Piece	Kyosuke Himuro
October 21	MTV Unplugged Live	Chage and Aska
October 28	Kyutai no kanaderu ongaku	Kenji Ozawa
November 4	Indigo Chiheisen	Spitz
November 11	Indigo Chiheisen	Spitz
November 18	Dahlia	X Japan
November 25	Aozora no Tobira	Shōgo Hamada
December 2	Beloved	Glay
December 9	Friends II	B'z
December 16	Greeting	V6
December 23	Maximum	MAX
December 30	Golden Q	Sharan Q
