= Can You Celebrate? =

- Mini CD cover

Single by Namie Amuro

from the album Concentration 20
- Released: February 19, 1997
- Recorded: 1996
- Studio: Sony Music Studios (New York City)
- Genre: Pop; gospel; classical
- Length: 6:16
- Label: Avex Trax
- Songwriter: Tetsuya Komuro
- Producer: Tetsuya Komuro

Namie Amuro singles chronology
"A Walk in the Park" (1996)	"Can You Celebrate?" (1997)	"How to Be a Girl" (1997)

Alternative cover
- Maxi-single cover

"Can You Celebrate?" (stylized in all caps) is the ninth single by Japanese recording artist Namie Amuro. Serving as the second single from her third studio album Concentration 20, it was released on February 19, 1997, by Avex Trax. Its lyrics and composition was handled solely by Tetsuya Komuro. Musically, "Can You Celebrate?" is a power ballad that incorporates gospel and classical music. Lyrically, the song express a longing for a deep and lasting love, asking if the listener can celebrate and kiss the singer.

The song received warm reception from music critics, praising its production and Amuro's vocal performance, with some considering it to be a highlight from her discography. Commercially, the single was a massive success in Japan, becoming Amuro's biggest hit to date. "Can You Celebrate?" is the best-selling single by a female Japanese solo artist, with sales of over 2.29 million copies. Additionally, it is ranked as the 14th best-selling single of all time in the history of the Oricon Singles Chart.

The song also served as the opening theme for the dorama Virgin Road in 1997, which starred Emi Wakui, Tetsuya Takeda and Takashi Sorimachi. Amuro herself appeared in the opening sequence of the drama, along with Tetsuya Komuro on the piano. The re-release of "Can You Celebrate?" as a maxi single in December 1997 was a Christmas gift from Komuro to commemorate Amuro's wedding with Masaharu Maruyama of TRF. Featuring remixes of "Can You Celebrate?" as well as a remix of "Dreaming I Was Dreaming," the reissued single also charted number one the following year.

== Background and recording ==
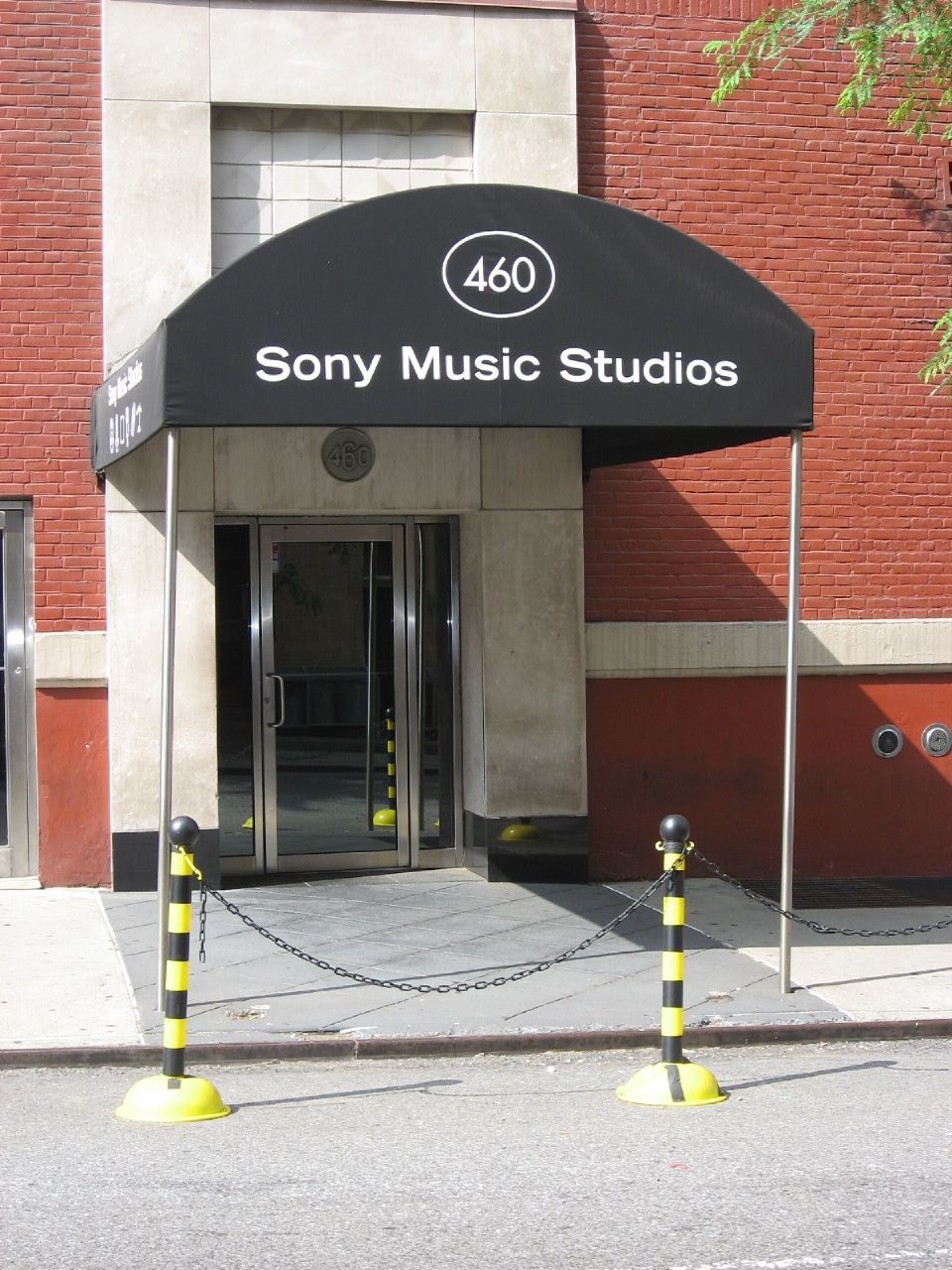
"Can You Celebrate" was recorded at Sony Music Studios in New York City.

In summer 1996, Amuro released her sophomore album Sweet 19 Blues, which was her first release since severing ties with Super Monkey's. The album was a mammoth success, reaching number one on the Oricon Albums Chart, receiving a triple million certification from the RIAJ, spawning three number one hits, and was even the best-selling Japanese album of all time for a brief moment. By the end of the year, Sweet 19 Blues was named the second best-selling album in Japan of 1996, right behind Globe's eponymous debut album. After this monumental success, recording for its follow-up began immediately.

When Miwako Kurihara, the executive producer of Virgin Road, asked Komuro to produce the song "Can You Celebrate?," she requested that he "write the last and greatest wedding song of the 20th century in the Komuro style." Komuro replied with, "Is there anything else you would like to order? It's easier for me to do what you want if you tell me what you want, rather than leaving it up to me to do it all." So Kurihara asked, "Please make a song that can be played in both happy scenes and sad, tearful scenes."

Once completed in the fall of 1996 at Sony Music Studios in Hell's Kitchen, New York City, Kurihara instructed him to redo the composition. In response, Komuro immediately played the piano and explained the expected completion of the song, and the recording was immediately redone and the demo tape was completed in two weeks. Because of Komuro's intention that "the quality of this song cannot be understood with a half-baked sound," the entire composition was recorded with a full orchestra, which was unusual for a demo tape.

== Composition ==
"Can You Celebrate?"
"Can You Celebrate?" is a power ballad that draws inspiration from gospel and classical music.

Musically, "Can You Celebrate?" is a power ballad that takes strong influences from gospel and classical music; it incorporates ethereal strings, and an emotional piano sound into the composition. Lyrically, the song express a longing for a deep and lasting love, asking if the listener can celebrate and kiss the singer.

Amuro expressed her feelings about the song by commenting, “I am happy that a ballad that I thought I was not good at was accepted by so many people. It has become a song of memories.” The lyric “Let's a party time tonight” in the song is a typographical error; in fact, the actual lyrics were “It's a party time tonight,” according to Komuro himself. On the other hand, Komuro chose to use English and Japanese expressions that are grammatically incorrect because they sounded better to him.

== Release and promotion ==
Still from the 1997 version of the music video showing Amuro singing in a flower field.

Avex Trax released "Can You Celebrate?" in Japan on February 19, 1997, as a mini CD. It serves as the second single from Amuro's third studio album Concentration 20 (1997). "Can You Celebrate?" was used as the theme song to the popular dorama Virgin Road. Amuro and Komuro both appear in the title sequence of the dorama. On December 25, 1997, the single was re-released as a maxi-single to celebrate Amuro's marriage to Masaharu Maruyama.

The original music video for "Can You Celebrate?" was directed by Wataru Takeishi. The 1997 version of the music video depicts Amuro singing in an empty house, in a rain shower and in a flower field while wearing a brown tuxedo or a long black dress.

In 2014, a new version for the song's music video was filmed for its re-recorded version on the ballad compilation album Ballada (2014). This version was directed by Kensuke Kawamura, and features Amuro singing in a white ballgown in a room entirely adorned in lights.

== Reception ==
=== Critical reception ===
"Can You Celebrate?" received positive reception from music critics. AllMusic cited the song as a standout from Amuro's discography. The magazine CDJournal reacted to the song positively in their review of Concentration 20, calling the instrumentation "beautiful" and praising Amuro's vocal performance throughout.

=== Commercial response ===
In Japan, "Can You Celebrate?" was a massive success on the Oricon Singles Chart. It debuted at the top spot of the chart with 828,480 copies sold in its first week of availability, becoming Amuro's highest first week sales for a CD single. The single resided at number one for a second week, selling 460,860 copies. It slid to number two during its third week on the chart, with 311,440 copies sold. On its fourth week it stayed at number two, with 158,900 copies sold. On the single's fifth week it continued to reside at number two, shifting 116,340 copies. On its sixth week of availability, "Can You Celebrate?" dropped to number four on the weekly singles chart with 80,110 copies sold. After April 7, 1997, the single remained in the top ten for an additional two weeks. "Can You Celebrate?" was Japan's highest-selling single of 1997, topping the year-end Oricon Singles Chart with 2,223,090 copies sold throughout the fiscal year. The single charted in the top 100 for forty weeks and sold a reported total of 2,296,200 copies during its chart run, making it the best-selling single by a female Japanese soloist and the fourteenth best-selling single of all time in Japan. "Can You Celebrate?" received a double million certification from the RIAJ, becoming Amuro's first and only single to accomplish this.

The maxi single re-release reached number one on Oricon's weekly singles chart on January 12, 1998, with 280,060 copies sold in its opening week. The re-released single ranked for eight weeks in the top 100 and sold 454,020 copies, becoming the 54th best-selling single in Japan of 1998. The maxi-single re-release was certified platinum for selling over 500,000 copies.

== Live performances ==
In 1997, Amuro performed "Can You Celebrate?" as the first headliner on the 1997 FNS Music Festival and Music Station Super Live 1997; the Super Live performance was also Amuro's last appearance on Music Station before her maternity leave. Amuro sang "Can You Celebrate?" at the 48th NHK Kohaku Uta Gassen, and then took a year off from her singing career to give birth and raise her child. She made a comeback at the 49th NHK Kohaku Uta Gassen in 1998, and sang the song for the second year in a row. During her comeback performance that night she was so moved by the warm applause and cheers from the audience that she shed tears during the scene. When Amuro appeared at Kohaku in 1998, the audience rating for each singer was 64.9%, the highest audience rating for a singer in history.

== Accolades ==
With this song, she won the "Grand Prix" at the 39th Japan Record Awards, her second consecutive award following her win for "Don't Wanna Cry" the year prior. On the day of the event, Tetsuya Komuro came to congratulate her with a bouquet of flowers and also played the piano and sang the chorus in the song. Amuro was so moved that she sang the song with tears in her eyes. Other awards include Song of the Year (Japanese Music Grand Prix) at the 12th Japan Gold Disc Awards. It ranked first in the annual ranking of copyright royalty distribution (domestic works) by the Japanese Society for Rights of Authors, Composers and Publishers (JASRAC) in 1997, and won the Gold Award at the 1998 JASRAC Awards. It was ranked 10th in the same ranking for the year 2018. "Can You Celebrate?" is also ranked 15th in the Heisei era royalty distribution rankings.

== Track listings ==
CD single

1. "Can You Celebrate? (Straight Run)" (Tetsuya Komuro) – 6:16
2. "Can You Celebrate? (Seventh Avenue South Mix)" (Tetsuya Komuro) – 8:41
3. "Can You Celebrate? (Back Track with TK)" (Tetsuya Komuro) – 6:16

1997 re-released maxi single

1. "Can You Celebrate? (Wedding Mix)" – 6:28
2. "Dreaming I Was Dreaming (Subconscious Mix)" – 5:21
3. "Can You Celebrate? (Heavenly Mix)" – 4:46
4. "Can You Celebrate? (Wedding Mix – Instrumental)" – 6:28
5. "Dreaming I Was Dreaming (Subconscious Mix – Instrumental) – 5:20

== Personnel ==
- Namie Amuro – vocals, background vocals
- Tetsuya Komuro – piano, background vocals
- Valerie Pinkerton-Background vocals
- Lynn Mabry-Background vocals
- Will Wheaton-Background vocals
- Kazuhiro Matsuo – guitar
- Producer – Tetsuya Komuro
- Arrangement – Tetsuya Komuro, Cozy Kubo
- String Arrangement – Randy Waldman
- Additional production – Robert Arbittier, Gary Adante
- Mixing – Dave Way
- Remixing – Joe Chiccarelli

== TV performances ==
- February 4, 1997 – Utaban
- February 9, 1997 – Super Jockey
- February 10, 1997 – Hey! Hey! Hey! Music Champ
- February 14, 1997 – Music Station
- February 16, 1997 – Mega Hits Special
- March 7, 1997 – Music Station
- March 28, 1997 – Music Station Special
- March 31, 1997 – Hey! Hey! Hey! Music Champ in Daiba
- May 21, 1997 – TK Groove Museum Hong Kong
- May 27, 1997 – TK Pan-Pacific Tour
- October 3, 1997 – Music Station Special
- November 16, 1997 – 1st The Japan Audition
- November 28, 1997 – TK Groove Museum Beijing
- December 11, 1997 – FNS Music Festival
- December 26, 1997 – Music Station Special Super Live 1997
- December 31, 1997 – 39th Japan Record Awards
- December 31, 1997 – 48th Kōhaku Uta Gassen
- December 31, 1998 – 49th Kōhaku Uta Gassen
- December 27, 1999 – SMAP X SMAP
- April 12, 2000 – Music Museum
- December 2, 2000 – Love Love Aishiteru
- March 30, 2001 – Music Station Special
- December 6, 2001 – FNS Music Festival
- December 25, 2001 – Eienteki Oto Raku Shounen
- September 27, 2004 – Hey! Hey! Hey! Music Champ Special

== Charts ==
Chart (1997)	Peak position
Japan Singles (Oricon) (8cm)	1
Taiwan Singles (IFPI Taiwan)	2

Chart (1998)	Peak position
Japan Singles (Oricon) (12cm)	1

=== Monthly charts ===
Chart (1997)	Peak position
Japan Singles (Oricon) (8cm)	1

Chart (1998)	Peak position
Japan Singles (Oricon) (12cm)	3

=== Year-end charts ===
Chart (1997)	Position
Japan Singles (Oricon) (8cm)	1

Chart (1998)	Peak position
Japan Singles (Oricon) (12cm)	54

== Certifications and sales ==
Region	Certification	Certified units/sales
Japan (RIAJ) 8cm release	2× Million	2,296,200
Japan (RIAJ) 12cm release	Platinum	454,020
Japan (RIAJ) Digital	Platinum	250,000^{*}
^{*} Sales figures based on certification alone.
