= 38th Japan Record Awards =

1996 Japanese music awards ceremony

- Date: 31 December 1996
- Venue: TBS A-Studio, Tokyo
- Hosted by: Masaaki Sakai

Television/radio coverage
- Network: TBS

The 38th Annual Japan Record Awards (第38回日本レコード大賞) took place on 31 December 1996, starting at 6:30PM JST. The primary ceremonies were televised in Japan on TBS.

The audience rating was 16.6%.

== Award winners ==
- Japan Record Award:
  - Tetsuya Komuro (producer) & Namie Amuro for "Don't Wanna Cry"
- Best Vocalist:
  - Yoshimi Tendo
- Best New Artist:
  - Puffy AmiYumi
- Best Album:
  - globe for "globe"
- New Artist Awards:
  - dos
  - Puffy AmiYumi
  - Speed
