= How to Be a Girl =

Single by Namie Amuro

from the album Concentration 20
- Released: May 21, 1997
- Genre: Pop; dance; rock
- Length: 13:06
- Label: Avex Trax
- Songwriters: Tetsuya Komuro; Marc Panther
- Producer: Tetsuya Komuro

Namie Amuro singles chronology
"Can You Celebrate?" (1997)	"How to Be a Girl" (1997)	"Dreaming I Was Dreaming" (1997)

"How to Be a Girl" is the tenth single by Japanese recording artist Namie Amuro. It was released on May 21, 1997, through Avex Trax. It was used as the Bristol-Myers Sea Breeze commercial song, which was used for four commercials. The style of the song is similar to that of her single "A Walk in the Park," which has an evident electronic sound in the vein of her producer Tetsuya Komuro's group globe. Lyrics were even written by Marc Panther, who is another member of the group. This was the final single from her third studio album Concentration 20 (1997), which was released two months later. The single is a follow-up to "Can You Celebrate?", which became her biggest hit.

This single reached number one on the weekly Oricon Singles Chart for two consecutive weeks, and continued to rank for a total of eleven weeks. "How to Be a Girl" sold 772,130 copies, becoming the twenty-third best-selling single in Japan of 1997. According to Avex, this is Amuro's first number one single to not sell over a million copies.

== Background and composition ==
Marc Panther and Komuro co-wrote the lyrics, with Panther writing the basic lyrics first and Komuro finishing them at the same time he was working on the composition. The singing sessions were conducted slowly over a period of two days. The concept was intended to be "a rock song that can be danced to."

== Music video ==
In the music video, Amuro changes her clothes in five different ways. The filming took place at Shintomichō Station on Sunday before the last train without permission. The set used was also created in one day before the shoot. The choreography by Kaba-chan, a well-known former member of the three-member music group dos, was also a popular topic of interest.

== Commercial performance ==
"How to Be a Girl" debuted at number one on the Oricon Singles Chart, with 328,560 copies sold in its first week. It stayed at number one for a second week with 162,340 copies sold. The single dropped to number four the following week, selling 88,600 copies. During its fourth week of availability the single stayed at number four with 65,660 copies sold. "How to Be a Girl" single stayed in the top ten one last week, ranking at number nine and selling 41,380 copies on its fifth week of availability. Afterwards, it dropped to number 16 on its sixth charting week and out of the top twenty entirely the following week. It charted in the top 100 for eleven weeks, selling a reported total of 772,130 copies. "How to be a Girl" ranked at number 23 on the year-end Oricon Singles Chart for 1997 and was certified million by the RIAJ.

== Track listing ==
1. How to Be a Girl – Straight Run
2. How to Be a Girl – Adult Education Mix
3. How to Be a Girl – Instrumental

== Personnel ==
- Namie Amuro – vocals

== Production ==
- Producer – toney black

== TV performances ==
- May 16, 1997 – Music Station
- May 24, 1997 – PopJam
- May 24, 1997 – CDTV
- May 30, 1997 – Music Station
- May 31, 1997 – PopJam
- June 9, 1997 – Hey! Hey! Hey!
- June 24, 1997 – Utaban

== Charts ==
Chart (1999)	Peak position
Japan Weekly Singles (Oricon)	1
Japan Monthly Singles (Oricon)	2
Japan Yearly Singles (Oricon)	23

== Certification and sales ==
Region	Certification	Certified units/sales
Japan (RIAJ)	Million	772,130
