= Digital Dance Mix Vol. 1 Namie Amuro =

1997 video game

- Cover art featuring Namie Amuro
- Developer: Sega AM2
- Publisher: Sega
- Producer: Yu Suzuki
- Designer: Yoshifusa Hayama
- Programmers: Tadahiro Kawamura; Hideki Tanaka
- Artist: Yoshifusa Hayama
- Composers: Tetsuya Komuro; Takenobu Mitsuyoshi; Hidenori Shoji
- Platform: Sega Saturn
- Release: JP: 10 January 1997
- Genre: Music game
- Mode: Single-player

Digital Dance Mix Vol. 1 Namie Amuro (Note: Japanese: デジタルダンスミックス Vol.1 安室奈美恵, Hepburn: Dijitaru Dansu Mikkusu Vol.1 Amuro Namie) is a 1997 music game developed by Sega AM2 and published by Sega for the Sega Saturn. The game stars Japanese singer Namie Amuro and features two songs from her 1996 studio album Sweet 19 Blues: "Chase the Chance" and "You're My Sunshine". Gameplay focuses on watching virtual performances of the two songs and playing minigames themed around Amuro.

Development was led by veteran producer and game designer Yu Suzuki. Amuro participated by performing motion capture for her in-game model, which was one of the most detailed and technically advanced models created for a Sega Saturn title. AM2 implemented new TrueMotion video compression technology that was designed to enable high quality video playback on the Saturn hardware.

Digital Dance Mix Vol. 1 Namie Amuro was released in Japan on 10 January 1997, and was sold exclusively through convenience store chains including Seven-Eleven and FamilyMart. Reviews were mixed, with praise for the detailed model of Amuro, but criticism for the small amount of content. It sold over 116,000 copies by late 1997. Further installments in the Digital Dance Mix series were planned but ultimately no other games were released.

== Gameplay ==
The game includes a "Digital Dance" mode where the player uses onscreen controls (bottom) to adjust the camera and music. Shown is a performance of "Chase the Chance".

Digital Dance Mix Vol. 1 Namie Amuro is a music game that is composed of three main game modes.

In "Digital Dance", the player watches a performance of either "Chase the Chance" or "You're My Sunshine", featuring choreography performed by a digital model of Amuro. The player may customize the type of stage and Amuro's outfit, with five stages and six costumes available to choose from. During the performance, the player may adjust the position and zoom of the in-game camera to observe the choreography from any angle. The camera may be programmed to follow a specific part of the model, such as the head or chest. The speed of the song can be changed.

"Sing It" is a karaoke mode in which lyrics are displayed onscreen and the volume of Amuro's vocals is lowered so the player may sing along to the track. The player can freely stop, play, or rewind the song to practice.

The "Presents" mode features four simple minigames themed around Amuro. "Chase the Dance" is a rhythm game in which button inputs must be pressed in time with the song. "Sweet 16 Cards" is a card-matching memory game. "Door my Sunshine" is a simple puzzle game where the player must assemble a door from puzzle pieces. "A Walk In The Maze" is a maze game in which the player must guide a monkey through a maze to reach Amuro. A brief profile of Amuro's biographical information and a summary of her discography up to 1996 can also be viewed.

== Development ==
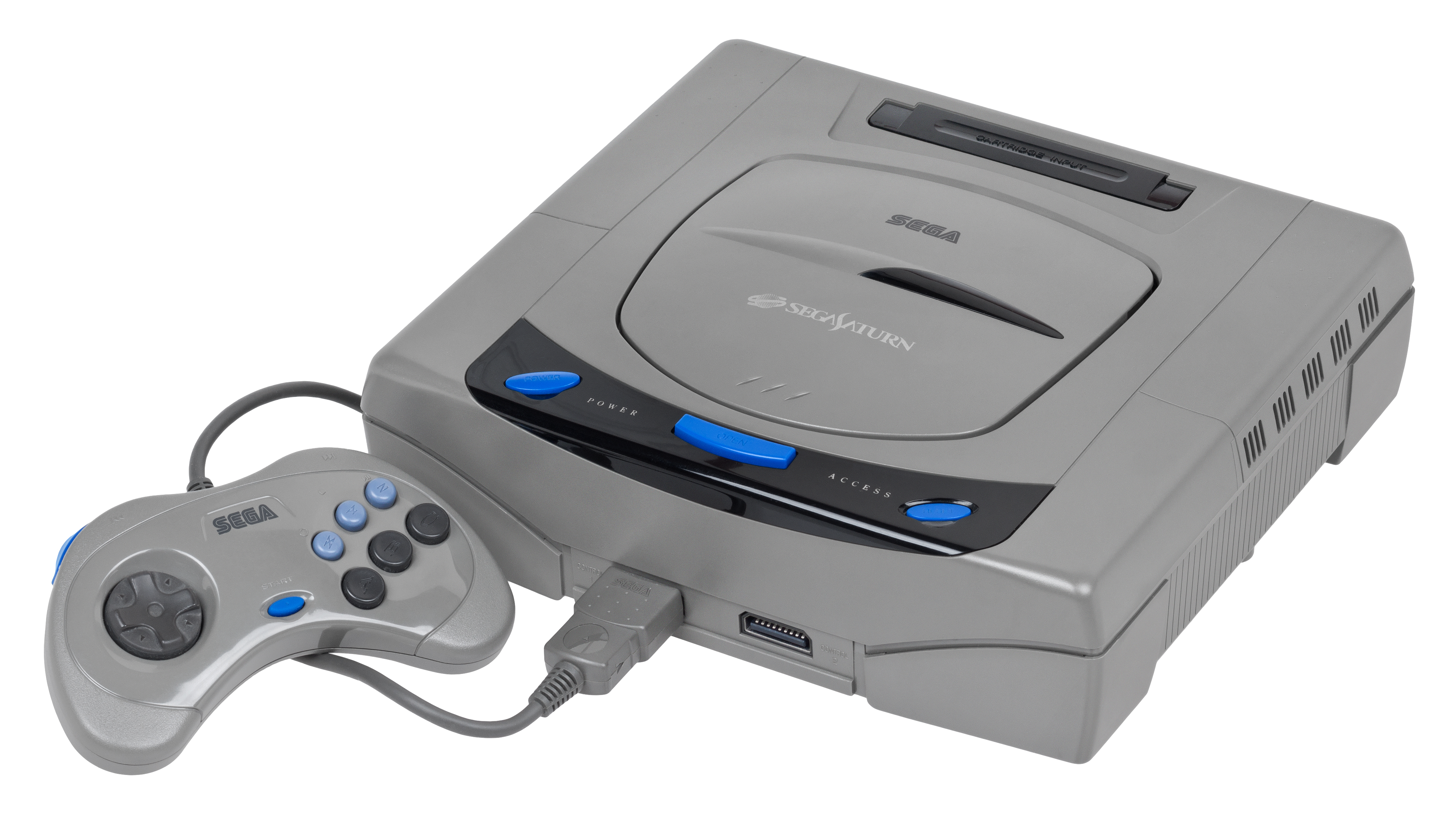
Sega released Digital Dance Mix Vol. 1 Namie Amuro exclusively on the Sega Saturn.

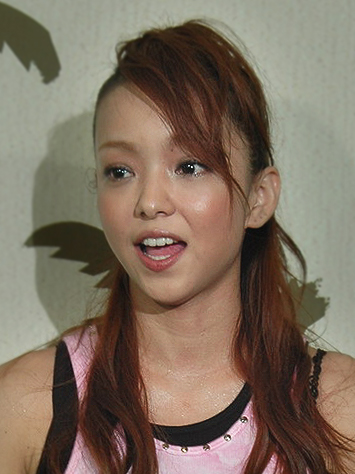
Namie Amuro (pictured in 2005) provided motion capture for the virtual choreography.

Digital Dance Mix Vol. 1 Namie Amuro was developed by Sega AM2, a team within Sega. The game was produced by Yu Suzuki, who had previously created games including Out Run (1986) and the Virtua Fighter franchise. He explained that its concept originated from the Virtua Fighter CG Portrait series that AM2 had developed beginning in 1995, which featured pre-rendered still images of 3D modeled characters. The developers wanted to create a more interactive title that used real-time rendering and would allow players to adjust the in-game camera. Suzuki further described it as an example of music software that was "a step forward" from traditional CDs and DVDs, suggesting that players could use the game to practice karaoke or learn choreography. Development was completed rapidly over a period of approximately two months.

Namie Amuro performed motion capture to produce the game's animations and choreography, and she personally selected the lineup of costumes that would be included. According to Suzuki, Amuro was chosen to be featured as she was the most popular artist in Japan at the time. He believed that her inclusion could make the game appeal to the general public and music fans who did not typically play video games. At Amuro's request, her choreographer created a new dance routine for "Chase the Chance" that she specially performed for use in the game. Amuro was very impressed with the game's accurate recreation of her choreography. The dance performances are rendered in real time at 60 frames per second. The music was originally composed and arranged by Tetsuya Komuro for Amuro's second studio album Sweet 19 Blues (1996); Komuro was correspondingly credited as a composer for the game.

The motion capture process was based on wireless technology AM2 had previously developed to create animations for Virtua Fighter 3 (1996). The virtual model of Amuro, one of the most technically advanced and detailed models in a Sega Saturn game, was created by scanning her face to create a 3D image that became the base of the model. In a December 1996 interview, Suzuki explained that AM2's adoption of 3D scanning had substantially accelerated character modelling. Whereas creating a polygonal character face had taken approximately two months for past games, the new process could capture the underlying facial data in around 15 minutes. Suzuki noted that the captured motion sometimes required additional processing to correct tracking errors and smooth the resulting animations.

Video editing for the game's pre-recorded opening video was handled by editor Shūichi Kakesu, who was previously known for working with director Mamoru Oshii on the anime film Ghost in the Shell (1995) and had been introduced to Suzuki at a trade event. Kakesu was provided with five of Amuro's promotional videos, and he was asked to use footage from two of them to create a new video approximately three minutes in duration. While he was new to the video game industry, Kakesu was interested in working on the game as he believed the 3D animation technology developed for video games had the potential to impact anime and filmmaking productions. A new implementation of the TrueMotion compression codec was used to render the video. Sega had chosen to use this technology on its consoles for cost reasons; unlike MPEG, TrueMotion did not need separate decoding hardware. A TrueMotion engineer wrote the new version specifically for AM2 in response to criticism that video playback on the Saturn was inferior to other consoles; it allowed for enhanced playback that was superior to previous Saturn games. Suzuki described the resulting video as "very high-quality movie footage".

=== Unproduced sequels ===
Suzuki stated in January 1997 that future installments in the Digital Dance Mix series were planned, which would feature other artists beyond Amuro. He expressed interest in developing a second game starring Amuro as well as a dancing game featuring the Virtua Fighter characters Sarah Bryant and Pai Chan. In December 1996, shortly before the release of Digital Dance Mix Vol. 1 Namie Amuro, American singer Michael Jackson visited Sega headquarters in Tokyo and was photographed performing various dance moves, leading to speculation that a Digital Dance Mix game starring Jackson was in development.

Ultimately, no further games were released, leaving Vol. 1 Namie Amuro as a standalone game. Suzuki later explained in 2011 that he had anticipated dance and rhythm games would become more popular, but did not develop further titles because he became uninterested in making a sequel that would be too similar to its predecessor.

== Release ==
Digital Dance Mix Vol. 1 Namie Amuro was released in Japan on 10 January 1997. The game was sold exclusively through convenience store chains in Japan, including Seven-Eleven, FamilyMart, Circle K, Sunkus, and Shikoku Spar. It was made available at over 16,000 stores at launch. Although the game was formally published by Sega, distribution at convenience stores was handled by DigiCube. A Sega representative stated in an April 1997 interview that the company chose to distribute the game through DigiCube "based on the content of the software" and that it was not developed specifically for release at convenience stores.

Coverage of the game in Western media was limited due to its Japan-only release, and publications generally viewed it as a curiosity that was unlikely to be sold internationally. Game Players characterized it as part of a new wave of Japanese music games alongside PaRappa the Rapper (1996), while GamePro and Computer and Video Games commented on the atypical convenience store release strategy. GameFan noted the realistic motion-captured movement of Amuro's model, and wrote that "console game machines appear to be becoming the stage for singers". British magazine Mean Machines Sega, describing the title as "a concert sim", opined that "Digital Dance Mix has about a 0.005% chance of coming out in this country". Similarly, Computer and Video Games believed that "there's hardly any chance of it being released in the UK, unless Sega can persuade the Spice Girls to have a go".

In January 1998, Edge reported that a version of Digital Dance Mix Vol. 1 Namie Amuro for the Panasonic M2 had been showcased at the Digitalmedia World Expo trade event in November 1997. The port was never released due to the cancellation of the M2 platform.

== Reception ==
Digital Dance Mix Vol. 1 Namie Amuro was not a commercial success. It sold 49,186 copies in its first week of release, placing number 2 in the Famitsu Top 30 for week 2 in 1997. Sales reached 100,000 copies by April 1997, and 116,553 copies by November 1997.

The game received mixed reviews. Praise was directed to the detailed model of Namie Amuro, while criticism focused on the small amount of content, with only two songs included. The South Korean magazine Game Champ regarded Digital Dance Mix Vol. 1 Namie Amuro as an attempt by Sega to expand the Saturn's appeal beyond conventional video games, and commended AM2 for their use of 3D scanning and motion capture to create Amuro's model. The magazine considered it an innovative way to enjoy interactive digital media through the Saturn. Writing for Game Criticism, Wataru Hayashimura praised the technical achievement of making the game for the Saturn, and speculated that it might lead to a port of Virtua Fighter 3 for the system. However, he criticized the dance animations for seeming stiff and robotic, and unfavorably compared the animation and use of music to PaRappa the Rapper.

The Japanese Sega Saturn Magazine stated that the game's content "seemed to still be in the planning stages" and wished that there was more interactivity in the gameplay. Hungarian magazine 576 Kbyte praised the high-resolution model of Amuro but called the game "a video clip emulator" without lasting appeal. The English Sega Saturn Magazine lauded Amuro's model and the high framerate, but panned the minigames. The publication deemed the title "spectacularly without point" for anyone other than fans of Amuro and wrote that it was "very expensive considering what it offers".

Retrospective commenters have identified Digital Dance Mix Vol. 1 Namie Amuro as a precursor to other music and rhythm games, including Bust a Groove (1998), Space Channel 5 (1999), and the Hatsune Miku: Project Diva series.

== See also ==
- Namie Amuro discography
