= Taeko Nishino =

Japanese singer and actress

Taeko Nishino (Japanese: 西野妙子) is a Japanese singer and actress. She was an idol, and the lead singer of dos.

== Life ==
She was born in 1975.

== Discography ==
She released the following singles:

- A Kyu Kiss (Japanese: A級キッス) (1990)
- Give Me Paradise (Japanese: ギブ・ミー・パラダイス)
- Kanashii Ringo (Japanese: 悲しい林檎) (1991). This single reached number 42 on the Oricon Singles Chart, and spent five weeks in that chart.
- Junjokarende Gomennasai (Japanese: 純情可憐でごめんなさい) (1991). This single reached number 50 on the Oricon Singles Chart, and spent three weeks in that chart.
- Junai Kyo Jidai (Japanese: 純愛狂時代) (1991)
- 246 Heartbreakers (1991)
- Kanashii Onna Ni Nacchau Yo (Japanese: 悲しい女になっちゃうよ) (1992)
- Mafuyu Datte Iijanai (Japanese: 真冬だっていいじゃない)(1992)
- Kizu Darake No Kiss (Japanese: 傷だらけのキス) (1993)
- Kiss Me (1994)
- Patron (Japanese: パトロン) (1994)
- Deep Grind (1997). This single reached number 42 on the Oricon Singles Chart, and spent five weeks in that chart.

She released the following albums:

- Rythm Jam (1991)
- Flower Groove (1991). This album was praised by James Taylor.
- Hatsubaiyoteibi (Japanese: 発売予定日) (1992)
- Taste of the West (1992)
- Innocent Tune (1994)
- Golden Best Taeko Nishino (2026)

== Concerts ==
Her first concert was at the Nippon Seinenkan on 29 April 1991, and was released on video as First Concert 1991: Junjokarende Gomennasai (Japanese: First Concert 1991: 純情可憐でごめんなさい).

== Television ==
She appeared in an episode of Cafe City Yokohama (カフェシティヨコハマ) on TVK.

== dos ==
dos, or dance of sound, was a trio of singers consisting of Taeko Nishino, Asami Yoshida and Kaba-chan. It was produced by Tetsuya Komuro. The group appeared on the "Komuro Garcon" segment of Asayan. The group won a new artist award at the 38th Japan Record Awards.

dos released the following singles:

- Baby Baby Baby (1996). This single reached number 4 on the Oricon Singles Chart, and spent ten weeks in that chart. It reached number 5 on the Dempa Publications singles chart. In one week it sold 80,000 copies. It was certified platinum by RIAJ in April 1996.
- More Kiss (1996). This single reached number 6 on the Oricon Singles Chart, and spent ten weeks in that chart. It reached number 9 on the Dempa Publications singles chart. It was certified gold by RIAJ in August 1996.
- Close Your Eyes (1996). This single reached number 26 on the Oricon Singles Chart, and spent two weeks in that chart.

dos released the following album:

- Chartered (1996). This album reached number 3 on the Oricon Albums Chart, and spent seven weeks in that chart. It reached number 6 on the Dempa Publications albums chart. It was certified gold by RIAJ in October 1996.
