= A Walk in the Park =

Single by Namie Amuro

from the album Concentration 20
- Released: November 27, 1996
- Recorded: 1996
- Genre: Electronic rock
- Length: 5:39
- Label: Avex Trax
- Songwriter(s): Tetsuya Komuro
- Producer(s): Tetsuya Komuro

Namie Amuro singles chronology
"Sweet 19 Blues" (1996)	"A Walk in the Park" (1996)	"Can You Celebrate?" (1997)

"A Walk in the Park" is the eighth single by Japanese recording artist Namie Amuro from her third studio album Concentration 20 (1997). The song was released as the album's lead single on November 27, 1996, by Avex Trax. It was written, composed and produced by Tetsuya Komuro. The song is an electronic rock track, which features instrumentation from guitars, synthesizers, organs, keyboards and drums. Lyrically, it explores themes of loneliness, longing, and the desire for connection.

"A Walk in the Park" received positive reviews from music critics, who complimented the song's production and composition. Commercially, the song became her fourth number one single on the Oricon Singles Chart and her fourth million-selling single in Japan. The accompanying music video was directed by Masashi Mutō. Since its release, the song has appeared on several of Amuro's concert tours and subsequent live releases, as well as her greatest hits album 181920 (1998), and was re-recorded for her final compilation album Finally (2017).

== Background and composition ==
"a walk in the park"
"A Walk in the Park" is musically an upbeat electric rock song.

In summer 1996, Amuro released her sophomore album Sweet 19 Blues, which was her first release since severing ties with Super Monkey's. The album was a mammoth commercial success, reaching number one on the Oricon Albums Chart, receiving a triple million certification from the RIAJ, spawning three number one hits, and was even the best-selling Japanese album of all time for a brief moment. By the end of the year, Sweet 19 Blues was named the second best-selling album in Japan of 1996, right behind Globe's eponymous debut album. After this monumental success, recording for its follow-up began immediately.

"A Walk in the Park" is the first single from her third studio album Concentration 20 (1997). Japanese producer and composer Tetsuya Komuro had written, arranged and composed the song. Komuro collaborated with Amuro on her second studio album Sweet 19 Blues (1996) and his final work with Amuro was her album Break the Rules (2000). It was recorded in Tokyo, Japan and was mixed and mastered by Eddie Delena. Musically, "A Walk In The Park" is a brisk electronic rock number with a chorus that envelops the listener in warm sunlight. Lyrically, it explores themes of loneliness, longing, and the desire for connection while depicting a sense of sadness and unspoken feelings. Komuro participates by singing in the chorus.

== Release and promotion ==
Still from the music video for "A Walk in the Park"

Avex Trax released "A Walk in the Park" in Japan on November 27, 1996. It serves as the lead single for Amuro's second studio album Concentration 20 (1997). "A Walk in the Park" served as the commercial song for Maxell UD commercials.

The music video for "A Walk in the Park" was directed by Masashi Mutō. The video features Amuro in a white room, wearing a black tuxedo and a white coat and dress. It ended up appearing on her video album 181920 Films (1998). The choreography was done by the well-known former member of Dos, Kaba-chan. Amuro performed the song at the Japan Cable Awards in December 1996 and at the Japan Gold Disc Awards in February 1997.

== Reception ==
Music critics gave "A Walk in the Park" positive reviews. AllMusic had previously hailed the song as a standout from Amuro's discography. In his review of Concentration 20, AllMusic's Ted Mills described "A Walk in the Park" as a terrific pop song and one of the album's highlights. CDJournal gave the song a positive review, calling it "refreshing," and praised its guitar riff and uplifting synths.

Commercially, "A Walk in the Park" was successful in Japan. Released four months after the massive success of her first studio album Sweet 19 Blues, it became her fourth number one and million selling single. The single spent seven weeks into the top five and eight weeks in top ten totally. "A Walk in the Park" sold 1,066,580 copies by the end of 1997, making it the 13th best-selling single of the year. According to Oricon Style, it ranks as her 5th best-selling single in the country.

== Track listing ==
1. "A Walk in the Park (Straight Run)" (Tetsuya Komuro) – 5:39
2. "A Walk in the Park (Fabulous Freak Brothers Mix)" (Tetsuya Komuro) – 7:01
3. "A Walk in the Park (Back Track with TK)" (Tetsuya Komuro) – 5:36

== Personnel ==
- Producer, Composer, Arranger, Synthesizer Programming, Manipulating, Keyboards, Chorus - Tetsuya Komuro
- Guitar - Michael Thompson
- Bass - Kenji Sano
- Mixing - Eddie DeLena
- Additional Production (Track 2) - Gary Adante, Robert Arbittier

== Charts ==
=== Weekly charts ===
Chart (1996–1997)	Peak position
Japan Singles (Oricon)	1

=== Monthly charts ===
Chart (1996)	Peak position
Japan Singles (Oricon)	3

=== Year-end charts ===
Chart (1997)	Position
Japan Singles (Oricon)	13

== Certifications ==
Region	Certification	Certified units/sales
Japan (RIAJ)	Million	1,066,580
