= Sweet 19 Blues (song) =

1996 single by Namie Amuro

Single by Namie Amuro

from the album Sweet 19 Blues
- B-side: "Joy"
- Released: August 21, 1996
- Recorded: May 1996
- Genre: Pop; dance; R&B
- Length: 5:35
- Label: Avex Trax
- Songwriter: Tetsuya Komuro
- Producer: Tetsuya Komuro

Namie Amuro singles chronology
"You're My Sunshine" (1996)	"Sweet 19 Blues" (1996)	"A Walk in the Park" (1996)

"Sweet 19 Blues" (stylized in all caps) is the seventh single by Japanese recording artist Namie Amuro. It was composed, written and arranged by Tetsuya Komuro for her debut album of the same name. The single was released on August 21, 1996, by Avex Trax, following the album's success. The song's subject and the album in general was about the melancholic passing of another sweet year of youth, a particularly Japanese obsession.

Although it did not achieve the success of Amuro's previous singles, it still managed to debut at No. 2 on the Oricon Singles Chart with over 100,000 copies sold in its first week and eventually sold about half a million units overall. The single was certified platinum by the RIAJ for 400,000 copies shipped to stores.

The song was used as the ending theme song for the 1996 comedy film That's Cunning! Shijō Saidai no Sakusen?, in which Amuro also starred. Twelve years later, Miliyah Kato's 2008 hit song "19 Memories" sampled the song. In 2014, eighteen years after its release, a re-recorded version of "Sweet 19 Blues" was made for Amuro's compilation album Ballada. A rearranged version with new vocals was also included on Amuro's 2017 compilation album Finally.

== Production ==
After leaving Toshiba-EMI and signing with Avex Trax in 1995, Amuro started working on new music. Avex Trax hired Tetsuya Komuro, who previously worked with Amuro while she was with Super Monkey's. Sweet 19 Blues featured a diverse cast of collaborators and composers, including Cozy Kubo, Akio Togashi, Takahiro Maeda, M.c.A.T, and Randy Waldman. Komuro worked on Sweet 19 Blues while also recording his debut album with Japanese band Globe, which was finished around the same time as Amuro's album.

The song was produced simultaneously with globe's "Is this love" in late May 1996. The concept of the two songs share a common theme: "a girl who stopped baring her belly button and wearing a mini-skirt and started wearing pants" and "a girl who hides her body and tries to show her inner self." The songwriting process took longer than expected, but Komuro felt it accurately represented Amuro.

== Composition ==
The song carries its album's title, which according to Ted Mills from AllMusic, was a reflection of a "melancholic passing of another sweet year of youth" and a "particular Japanese obsession". Musically, the song is a melancholic ballad with R&B influences. The lyrics explore Amuro's feelings about leaving her youth behind. "Sweet 19 Blues" is the final full-length recording on its parent album, replacing guitar riffs by Kazuhiro Matsuo with Michael Thompson.

The song "Joy", which features vocals by m.c.A・T, is in fact a shortened version to what appears on the CD single of "Sweet 19 Blues"; two additional remixes appeared on it, whilst an original mix was featured on his single "Thunder Party". "Joy" was originally on m.c.A.T's fifth studio album Crossover.

== Reception ==
Toru Hajima commented; "I think this was the first Japanese hit song that I know of in which the first bar of the opening song began with ♭III (flat third). This represents one 'invention' that symbolizes that Tetsuya Komuro is a songwriter who, since the 1990s, has created an era".

Noritoshi Furuichi commented, "There is something strange about the way that 'absolute' and 'may be' are put together in one sentence."

== Chart performance ==
"Sweet 19 Blues" debuted at number two on the Oricon Singles Chart with 101,830 copies sold in its first week. It dropped to number four the next week, selling 82,220 copies. It dropped to number five on its third week, selling 59,140 copies. The single stayed in the top ten one last week, ranking at number nine and selling 53,730 copies. "Sweet 19 Blues" ranked at number 64 on the year-end Oricon Singles Chart for 1996. The single charted in the top 100 for thirteen weeks, selling a reported total of 452,890 copies.

== Music video ==
The original version of the "Sweet 19 Blues" music video was directed by Wataru Takeishi. The new version of the video was directed by Kanji Suto.

== Track listing ==
CD single / Digital download EP
No.	Title	Length
1.	"Sweet 19 Blues" (Straight Run)	5:35
2.	"Sweet 19 Blues" (KC Dub Mix)	5:37
3.	"Joy" (Straight Run)	3:58
4.	"Joy" (Extended Summertime Mix)	4:12

== Credits and personnel ==
Credits are taken from the CD single's liner notes.

- Tetsuya Komuro – production, composition, writing, arrangement (1), (2)
- Randy Waldman - strings arrangement (1), (2)
- Akio Togashi - composition, arrangement; writing, rapping (as m.c.A.T) (3), (4)
- Keith "KC" Cohen - mixing (3), (4)

== TV Performances ==
- ?, 1996 – Fun
- August 23, 1996 – Music Station
- August 24, 1996 – Mega Hit Night
- August 31, 1996 – PopJam
- August 31, 1996 – CDTV
- September 16, 1996 – Hey! Hey! Hey! Music Champ Special
- October 4, 1996 – Music Station Special
- October 29, 1996 – Utaban
- October 4, 1996 – Music Station Special
- November 2, 1996 – 27 hours TV
- November 26, 1996 – P-Stock
- December 14, 1996 – 29th All Japan Request Awards
- May 21, 1997 – TK Groove Museum HongKong
- May 27, 1997 – TK Pan-Pacific Tour

== Charts ==
Chart (1996)	Peak position
Japan Weekly Singles (Oricon)	2
Japan Monthly Singles (Oricon)	5
Japan Yearly Singles (Oricon)	64

== Certification and sales ==
Region	Certification	Certified units/sales
Japan (RIAJ)	Platinum	452,890
