= Body Feels Exit =

Single by Namie Amuro

from the album Sweet 19 Blues
- Released: October 25, 1995
- Recorded: 1995
- Genre: Pop, dance-pop, electronic, synthpop
- Length: 4:25
- Label: Avex Trax
- Songwriter: Tetsuya Komuro
- Producer: Tetsuya Komuro

Namie Amuro singles chronology
"Stop the music" (1995)	"Body Feels Exit" (1995)	"Chase the Chance" (1995)

"Body Feels Exit" (stylized as Body Feels EXIT) is Namie Amuro's debut solo single on the Avex Trax label. Released nine days after her only album with former label, Toshiba-EMI, "Body Feels Exit" debuted in the top three on the Oricon chart and would be her first of 24 consecutive top-ten solo singles.

== Information ==
"Body Feels Exit" can be considered her third single because she featured exclusively on "Stop the Music" and "Taiyou no Season," her two previous singles with the Super Monkey's. It also marks the beginning of the collaboration between Namie and Tetsuya Komuro. The song can be described as an upbeat dance track. "Body Feels Exit" was a huge hit at the time and remains one of the singer's most popular songs and a fan favorite. The original version of the song did not appear on her first studio album, Sweet 19 Blues, but was featured on her first greatest hits compilation 181920.

"Body Feels Exit" (1995)
Body Feels Exit, Namie Amuro's solo debut single

The single was certified platinum by the RIAJ for 400,000 copies shipped to stores.

== Taito ad campaign ==
The song was used as background music in eight commercials for TAITO to promote the X-55 model. Amuro appeared in all ad campaigns.

== Track listing ==
All tracks are written by Tetsuya Komuro.

CD
No.	Title	Length
1.	"Body Feels Exit" (Original Mix)	4:25
2.	"Body Feels Exit" (X-Tended Mix)	5:30
3.	"Body Feels Exit" (FKB Mix)	6:43
4.	"Body Feels Exit" (Original Karaoke)	4:22
Total length:		21:00

== Other versions ==
An English language version of "Body Feels Exit" was recorded by Eurobeat artist Virginelle. It appears on the album Super Eurobeat Vol. 80: Request Countdown 80 (1997) as part of a bonus disc of covers originally written by Tetsuya Komuro. The song was also performed by Anza Ohyama at a Sailor Moon Event in 1996.

== Personnel ==
- Namie Amuro – vocals, background vocals
- Tetsuya Komuro – background vocals, composing, arrangement

== Production ==
- Producer – Tetsuya Komuro
- Mixing - Dave Ford (Track 1, 2 & 4)
- Remix - FKB (Track 3)

== Charts ==
Oricon Sales Chart (Japan)

Release	Chart	Peak position	First week sales	Sales total	Chart run
October 25, 1995	Oricon Weekly Singles Chart	3	221,420	881,640	19 weeks

Oricon Sales Chart (Japan)

Release	Chart	Position	Sales total
October 25, 1995	Oricon 1995 Year-End Chart	70	510,880

Oricon Sales Chart (Japan)

Release	Chart	Position	Sales total
October 25, 1996	Oricon 1996 Year-End Chart	83	370,760
