= You're My Sunshine =

Single by Namie Amuro

from the album Sweet 19 Blues
- Released: June 5, 1996
- Genre: Pop; dance
- Length: 5:39
- Label: Avex Trax
- Songwriter(s): Tetsuya Komuro
- Producer(s): Tetsuya Komuro

Namie Amuro singles chronology
"Don't Wanna Cry" (1996)	"You're My Sunshine" (1996)	"Sweet 19 Blues" (1996)

"You're My Sunshine" (stylized as "You're my sunshine") is the sixth single by Japanese singer Namie Amuro. It was released on June 5, 1996, by Avex Trax and was produced by Tetsuya Komuro. The song was the image song for the Bristol-Myers Squibb (now Fine Today) "Sea Breeze '96" commercial in which she appeared. The version used in the initial commercial had a different tempo and tune from the CD package version. The following year, Amuro appeared in another "Sea Breeze" commercial, this time with her hit song "How to Be a Girl".

Commercially, "You're My Sunshine" was a success, becoming her third consecutive single to debut at #1 and sell over a million copies nationwide. Amuro promoted the single with several television performances throughout 1996. Since its release, the song has been included on the set list of several concert tours by Amuro. The song was also featured in the 1997 video game Digital Dance Mix Vol. 1 Namie Amuro for the Sega Saturn.

== Composition ==
"You're My Sunshine" was written and composed solely by J-Pop connoisseur Tetsuya Komuro. Musically, "You're My Sunshine" is a dance number that picks up tempo from the rap in the song. After the introduction, the tempo quickens and the male voice raps, followed by the chorus again. The single version of "You're My Sunshine" fades out, but the full version, included in the compilation album 181920, plays until the end. When it was included in the album Sweet 19 Blues, the mix was changed to the "Hollywood Mix" with percussion and other live sound oriented mixes. Consequently removing its original J-pop and eurobeat sound, in favor for a more "sophisticat[ed]" and "mature" composition.

== Music video ==
The music video for "You're My Sunshine" was directed by Shuichi Tan. The video was shot with the camera rotating in a circle; the composition seeming to circle around Amuro. Akin to her previous videos, a bare-chested male dancer makes an appearance.

== Chart performance ==
"You're My Sunshine" debuted at number one on the Oricon Singles Chart, with 434,230 copies sold in its first week. It stayed at number one on its second week of availability, selling 204,660 copies. On its third week the single fell to number two, selling 139,680 copies. On its fourth week it plummeted to number seven, selling 98,760 copies. The following week it dropped to number eight on the chart from selling 73,570 copies before dropping out the top ten entirely the following week. "You're My Sunshine" ranked at number 13 on the year-end Oricon Singles Chart for 1996. The single charted in the top 100 for twelve weeks and sold a reported total of 1,098,520 copies. The single received a million certification from the Recording Industry Association of Japan (RIAJ) for sales exceeding one million copies.

== Track listing ==
1. "You're My Sunshine (Straight Run)" (Tetsuya Komuro) – 5:39
2. "You're My Sunshine (Eddie Delena Dance Mix)" (Tetsuya Komuro) – 6:27
3. "You're My Sunshine (TV Mix)" (Tetsuya Komuro) – 5:36

== Production ==
- Producer – Tetsuya Komuro
- Arranger – Tetsuya Komuro
- Chorus Arranger - Joey Johnson
- Mixing & Remix – Eddie DeLena

== TV performances ==
- June 7, 1996 – Music Station
- June 10, 1996 – Hey! Hey! Hey! Music Champ
- June 15, 1996 – CDTV
- July 12, 1996 – Music Station
- July 17, 1996 – Avex Dance Net '96
- October 4, 1996 – Music Station Special
- November 26, 1996 – P-Stock
- December 16, 1996 – Asia Live Dream '96
- December 21, 1996 – PopJam X'mas Special
- December 27, 1999 – SMAP x SMAP

== Charts ==
Chart (1996)	Peak position
Japan Weekly Singles (Oricon)	1
Japan Monthly Singles (Oricon)	3
Japan Yearly Singles (Oricon)	13

== Certification and sales ==
Region	Certification	Certified units/sales
Japan (RIAJ)	Million	1,098,520
