= Chase the Chance =

Single by Namie Amuro

from the album Sweet 19 Blues
- Released: December 4, 1995
- Genre: J-pop; dance-pop; EDM
- Length: 4:25
- Label: Avex Trax
- Songwriters: Tetsuya Komuro; Takahiro Maeda
- Producer: Tetsuya Komuro

Namie Amuro singles chronology
"Body Feels Exit" (1995)	"Chase the Chance" (1995)	"Don't Wanna Cry" (1996)

"Chase the Chance" is the fourth single by Japanese singer Namie Amuro from her second studio album, Sweet 19 Blues (1996). It was released as the album's second single on December 4, 1995, through Avex Trax.

It debuted at number one on the Oricon charts, becoming her first of five singles to sell over a million copies. As of August 2012, the single has sold 1.3 million copies in Japan. At the end of the month, Amuro would make her first appearance as a solo artist on Kōhaku Uta Gassen performing the single. A pre-release TV commercial was released for the single, featuring excerpts from the music videos for her four previous singles (including three singles released by Toshiba-EMI) in slow motion and in black and white.

The song was featured in the 1997 video game Digital Dance Mix Vol. 1 Namie Amuro for the Sega Saturn.

== Background and release ==
"Chase the Chance" was Amuro's second single for the Avex Trax label, following "Body Feels Exit" which was released a month prior. 1995 became Amuro's breakthrough year as she parted ways with her former girl group, Super Monkey's, and saw her first run of solo singles reach top five on the Oricon charts. The rest of Super Monkey's regrouped as MAX earlier that same year and continued to dance backup for Amuro, with "Chase the Chance" marking the last single they performed with her. The group would go on to achieve success in their own right.

"Chase the Chance" was a runaway success and debuted as her first chart-topper. It outsold its predecessor by a third, and became her first of five singles to move more than a million copies.

"Chase the Chance" was also used as the theme song to the Nihon TV drama, "The Chef."

== Track listing ==
All lyrics are written by Tetsuya Komuro and Takahiro Maeda; all music is composed by Tetsuya Komuro, arranged by Tetsuya Komuro.

CD
No.	Title	Length
1.	"Chase the Chance" (Original Mix)	4:25
2.	"Chase the Chance" (Trip Club Mix)	5:30
3.	"Chase the Chance" (G.Wright Jungle Mix)	6:43
4.	"Chase the Chance" (Original Karaoke)	4:22
Total length:		21:02

== Personnel ==
- Namie Amuro – vocals, background vocals

== Production ==
- Producer – Tetsuya Komuro
- Arranger – Tetsuya Komuro
- Mixing – Gary Thomas Wright

== TV performances ==
- December 31, 1995 – Kōhaku Uta Gassen

== Charts ==
Oricon Sales Chart (Japan)

Release	Chart	Peak position	First week sales	Sales total	Chart run
December 4, 1995	Oricon Weekly Singles Chart	1	225,090	1,361,710	20 weeks

Oricon Sales Chart (Japan)

Release	Chart	Position	Sales total
December 4, 1995	Oricon 1996 Year-End Chart	10	1,361,710
