= M.c.A • T =

m.c.A • T
- Born: Akio Togashi (富樫 明生, Togashi Akio); May 15, 1961 (age 65); Sapporo, Japan
- Genres: Hip hop
- Occupations: Musician; rapper; singer; record producer
- Years active: 1989-present
- Label: Avex Trax
- Website: m.c.A・T

Akio Togashi (富樫 明生, Togashi Akio; born May 15, 1961 in Hokkaidō), better known by his stage name m.c.A • T (エムシーエーティー, Emu Shī Ē Tī; "Microphone Controller Akio Togashi") is a Japanese musician, rapper, singer and record producer with Avex Trax. He graduated from Hokkaido Sapporo Tsukisamu High School and the Hokkaido University of Education. His debut single as m.c.A·T, "Bomb A Head!," released in 1993 on Avex Trax, has since been re-released as "Bomb A Head! Returns!" in 2003 featuring DA PUMP and as "Bomb A Head! V" in 2004 as the opening theme of Tenjho Tenge.

He has also produced several of DA PUMP's releases, and like DA PUMP's ISSA, is a fan of the Kamen Rider Series. He has performed various songs for the series, collaborating with RIDER CHIPS on "The people with no name," the second ending theme for Kamen Rider 555, and on the single "Kamen Rider no Uta" (仮面ライダーのうた, Kamen Raidā no Uta) and with Rin' on "Flashback," the theme song for Kamen Rider Hibiki & The Seven Fighting Demons, as well as provided the voice for the Ghost Driver in Kamen Rider Ghost. He has also collaborated with Avex Trax artists such as AAA, Ayumi Hamasaki, Nami Tamaki, Namie Amuro, Toshinobu Kubota, and most recently Manabu Oshio on the single "Beastie Life" released late 2007. Several other artists he has worked with appear on the second disc for his latest album Music Conductor A·T.

== Discography ==
=== as Akio Togashi ===
Singles

- Primitive Power (1989)
- Let's A･B･C (1989)

Album

- Harlem Wonder Parade (1989)

=== as m.c.A·T ===
Singles and EPs

- Bomb A Head! (1993)
- Gold Chocolate. / I Miss U. (Promo, 1994)
- m.c.A·T Is 2 Funky. / Funky Gutsman!(Promo, 1994)
- Coffee Scotch Mermaid (1994)
- 風に叫ぶ~Energy Guy のテーマ~(Promo, 1994)
- 灼熱のMy Baby / Coffee Scotch Mermaid(Promo, 1994)
- 風に叫ぶ ~Energy Guyのテーマ~ (1994)
- Breakdown -Let's Go! Rookie Boy- (1995)
- Super Happy (1995)
- Oh! My Precious! (1995)
- Thunder Party (1996)
- Very Special Journey (1997)
- Bomb A Head! Returns! (2003)
- Bomb A Head! V (2004)
- Uh~lalala (2007)
- Beastie Life (2007)

Albums

- m.c.A·T (1994)
- Ah-yea-h (1995)
- Fight 4 da Future (1995)
- Crossover (1996)
- Returns! (2004)
- m.c.+A·T (2007)
- Music Conductor A·T (2008)
- Crystal Rainbow (2023)

Compilations and Remixes

- The Remix (1994)
- Da Remix II 12" Disc One (Single, 1995)
- Da Remix II (1996)
- Kissin' Me, Kissin' You (Da E-Smoove Remixes) (1996)
- One and Only (1997)
- m.c.A·T Best Singles+ (2007)
