= Tomomi Kahara =

Japanese singer (born 1974)

Tomomi Kahara 華原 朋美
- Born: 下河原 朋美 (Shimogawara Tomomi); August 17, 1974 (age 52); Koto, Tokyo, Japan
- Other name: Tomomi Kahala
- Occupations: Singer-songwriter; model; actress
- Spouse: Tomohiro Ohno (m. 2021; div. 2022)
- Children: 1
- Musical career
- Genres: J-pop; adult contemporary; pop rock; dance-pop
- Years active: 1995–2006; 2013–present
- Labels: Orumok Records; Warner Music Japan; Universal Music Japan
- Website: Universal Music Japan Site

Tomomi Kahara (華原 朋美, Kahara Tomomi) (formerly Tomomi Kahala) born Tomomi Shimogawara (下河原 朋美, Shimogawara Tomomi) on August 17, 1974 in Tokyo), is a Japanese pop singer. She is famous for working with Tetsuya Komuro who gave her much success in the 1990s, which led to her deep dip in popularity after 1999, the year in which she released her first non-TK produced album, One Fine Day. Tomomi Kahara and Tetsuya Komuro dated for a few years, but they suffered from personal problems which led to their breakup. After a period of sickness, Kahara's talent agency terminated her contract on June 29, 2007.

== Biography ==
=== Before 1995: Early life and career ===
Kahara was born in Koto, Tokyo in 1974. She attended Showa Gakuin Elementary, Shoin Junior, and Senior High School. She started her horse-riding lesson when she was three, and later received the 4th place in the National Sports Festival of Japan in 1992. Before she started her career as a singer, she worked as a model, and appeared in fashion magazines such as CanCam and Vivi as well as TV shows.

=== 1995–1997: Rise to fame ===
While working with Tetsuya Komuro, her first single "Keep Yourself Alive", was released in late 1995. It sold over 360,000 copies and went Top 10, peaking at No. 8. Her second single, "I Believe", was her first million-seller and added to her popularity. In March 1996, she released the single "I'm Proud" which peaked at No. 2 and was her best-selling single. It outsold Namie Amuro's singles released that year. In June 1996, she finally released her first album, Love Brace, a collection of songs about love and stated by Tetsuya Komuro to be his best work to date. It was a huge success selling over 2.5 million copies, half of them within the first week of release.

Already a big star, she and Tetsuya Komuro became an item and she continued to release singles, all peaking at 1. In December 1997, she finally released her second album, Storytelling. It went to the top of the charts and sold 1.37 million copies, much less than the 2.5 million copies that her previous album has sold.

=== 1998–1999: Decline ===
Since the release of Storytelling, her popularity began to decline and her relationship with her mentor, Tetsuya Komuro, was in every tabloid. Gossip magazines rumored that both of them were abusing drugs and that their relationship was beginning to fall apart. Her next single tumblin dice went only to the number-two position. Her music did not reach the top position again. Her next album, nine cubes, sold a depressing 261,000 copies, much less than her first two albums.

Her breakup with Tetsuya Komuro, frequent scandals, and suicide attempts shed her in a negative light in the conservative Japanese media. She finally left her record company, who released a compilation which sold well, over 600,000 copies and debuted at No. 1. At that time, gossip magazines were labeling rising-star, Ami Suzuki, as Kahara's replacement.

After some time relaxing after the scandals, Tomomi Kahara resumed her career at Warner writing her own lyrics.

=== 1999–2006: Post-Tetsuya Komuro ===
After Komuro, Kahara worked with a variety of producers at Warner Music Japan, including American Andy Marvel (Diana King, Jessica Simpson) and recorded songs by Gary Carolla (N Sync) and Vincent Degiorgio (N Sync, Atomic Kitten, Love, Inc., Mink, Nakano Mori Band) which appeared on her albums One Fine Day and Love Again, released in 1999 and 2001, respectively.

In 2004, Kahara signed with Universal Music Japan. (Now credited as Kahara. formerly Kahala.) Her most recent recordings for Universal Music Japan have shown her in a dazzling and sultry light with some of her best vocal performances to date. She covered some of her biggest hits and also recorded new songs from Korean and Japanese composers as well as pop standards such as "Ben", a cover version of the song by Michael Jackson. Her best-selling album at Universal sold a little over 50,000 copies and her latest album, Naked, sold only 12,000 copies, but she was still be seen in the media.

In 2006, after years of average fame, Tomomi Kahara returned briefly to the spotlight. She starred in a musical and her latest photobook, Crystallize II, which came with two strawberry condoms, sold unexpectedly well. She was one of the voice actors for the 'Sound of Music' Japanese DVD and she sang the theme song for a NHK Taiga drama.

=== 2007–present: hiatus and comeback announced ===
On June 29, 2007, Kahara canceled her contract with Ogipro after repeated personal issues began affecting her professional appearances. Following this, she went on hiatus, and it was uncertain whether she would return to the entertainment industry.

On November 4, 2008, Tetsuya Komuro was arrested. According to the Japanese weekly magazine Josei Jishin, Kahara was reportedly shocked by the news and suffered from insomnia.

On January 17, 2009, she was hospitalized after allegedly taking an excessive amount of tranquilizers.

On October 30, 2011, Kahara announced her intention to return to the entertainment industry. She began taking vocal and acting lessons in preparation.

By the end of 2012, she made her comeback with a live appearance on the FNS TV program.

On April 17, 2013, she released a new single titled Dreamed a Dream. This was followed by a self-cover album titled Dream: Self-Cover Best, released on June 26, 2013.

In August 2013, following the suicide of Hikaru Utada's mother, Kahara sparked controversy by stating that she wished to create a song about the event. Her comment was widely criticized as being insensitive.

In 2016, Kahara appeared as a guest artist in the Japanese touring ice show Fantasy on Ice, where she performed live in collaboration with various figure skaters during tour stops in Makuhari and Sapporo.

== Discography ==
=== Singles ===
List of singles, with selected chart positions
Year	Single	Peak chart positions	Sales	Label	Formats
Year	Single	JPN Physical	Sales	Label	Formats
1995	"Keep yourself alive"	8	370,000	Orumok Records	CD, digital download, streaming
1995	"I Believe"	1	1,028,490	Orumok Records	CD, digital download, streaming
1996	"I'm proud"	2	1,390,440	Orumok Records	CD, digital download, streaming
1996	"Love Brace"	6	255,000	Orumok Records	CD, digital download, streaming
1996	"Save your dream"	1	808,570	Orumok Records	CD, digital download, streaming
1997	"Hate tell a lie"	1	1,058,610	Orumok Records	CD, digital download, streaming
1997	"Love is all music"	1	653,000	Orumok Records	CD, digital download, streaming
1997	"Tanoshiku Tanoshiku" Yasashikune" (たのしく たのしく やさしくね)	1	416,560	Orumok Records	CD, digital download, streaming
1998	"I wanna go"	20	48,000	Orumok Records	CD, digital download, streaming
1998	"You Don't give up"	20	66,000	Orumok Records	CD, digital download, streaming
1998	"Tumblin' dice"	2	189,000	Warner Music Japan	CD, digital download, streaming
1998	"Here we are"	5	156,000	Warner Music Japan	CD, digital download, streaming
1998	"Daily News"	13	58,000	Warner Music Japan	CD, digital download, streaming
1999	"as A person"	6	287,000	Warner Music Japan	CD, digital download, streaming
1999	"Be Honest"	12	51,000	Warner Music Japan	CD, digital download, streaming
2000	"Believe In Future ~Mayonaka no Cinderella~" (真夜中のシンデレラ)	28	29,000	Warner Music Japan	CD, digital download, streaming
2000	"Blue Sky"	55	6,000	Warner Music Japan	CD, digital download, streaming
2001	"Never Say Never"	10	79,000	Warner Music Japan	CD, digital download, streaming
2001	"Precious"	32	14,000	Warner Music Japan	CD, digital download, streaming
2001	"Anata no Kakera" (あなたのかけら)	36	13,000	Warner Music Japan	CD, digital download, streaming
2002	"Akiramemashou" (あきらめましょう)	28	22,000	Warner Music Japan	CD, digital download, streaming
2003	"Pleasure"	55	4,000	Warner Music Japan	CD, digital download, streaming
2004	"Anata Ga Ireba" (あなたがいれば)	15	33,000	Universal Music Japan	CD, digital download, streaming
2005	"Namida No Tsuzuki" (涙の続き)	30	13,000	Universal Music Japan	CD, digital download, streaming
2006	"Hana/Keep on Running" (華/Keep On Running)	37	8,000	Universal Music Japan	CD, digital download, streaming
2006	"Ano sayonara ni sayonara wo" (あのさよならにさよならを)	46	5,000	Universal Music Japan	CD, digital download, streaming
2013	"Yume Yaburete -I Dreamed a Dream-"	13	-	Universal Music Japan	CD, digital download, streaming
2016	"Kimi ga Sobe de" (君がそばで)	46	-	Universal Music Japan	CD, digital download, streaming

==== Collaboration singles ====
List of singles, with selected chart positions
Year	Single	Peak chart positions	Sales	Label	Formats
Year	Single	JPN Physical	Sales	Label	Formats
2003	"Arigatou ne!" (ありがとね): with Hiroshi Takigawa	145	2,000	Tokuma Japan	CD

=== Digital singles ===
Year	Single	Reference
2022	"Carry's son"	
2023	"Change my everything"	

=== Albums ===
==== Studio albums ====
Title	Album details	Peak chart positions	Sales (JPN)
Title	Album details	JPN Oricon	Sales (JPN)
Love Brace	Released: June 3, 1996; Label: Orumok Records; Formats: CD, digital download, streaming	1	2,571,210
Storytelling	Released: December 24, 1997; Label: Orumok Records; Formats: CD, digital download, streaming	1	2,000,000
Nine cubes	Released: November 26, 1998; Label: Warner Music Japan; Formats: CD, digital download, streaming	5	400,000
One Fine Day	Released: November 25, 1999; Label: Warner Music Japan; Formats: CD, digital download, streaming	7	56,530
Love Again	Released: November 21, 2001; Label: Warner Music Japan; Formats: CD, digital download, streaming	26	11,370
Naked	Released: June 29, 2005; Label: Universal Music Japan; Formats: CD, digital download, streaming	30	11,944

==== Compilation albums ====
Title	Album details	Peak chart positions	Sales (JPN)
Title	Album details	JPN Oricon	Sales (JPN)
Kahala Compilation	Released: February 10, 1999; Label: Orumok Records; Formats: CD, digital download, streaming	1	695,730
Best Selection	Released: September 27, 2001; Label: Warner Music Japan; Formats: CD, digital download, streaming	23	21,860
Natural Breeze: Kahala Best 1998-2002	Released: July 17, 2002; Label: Warner Music Japan; Formats: CD, digital download, streaming	37	7,620
Super Best Singles~10th Anniversary	Released: December 14, 2005; Label: NBCUniversal Entertainment Japan; Formats: CD, digital download, streaming	65	5,012
All Time Singles Best	Released: June 26, 2015; Label: Universal Music Japan; Formats: CD, digital download, streaming	9	-
All Time Selection Best	Released: June 26, 2015; Label: Universal Music Japan; Formats: CD, digital download, streaming	29	-

==== Self-cover albums ====
Title	Album details	Peak chart positions	Sales (JPN)
Title	Album details	JPN Oricon	Sales (JPN)
Dream: Self Cover Best	Released: June 26, 2013; Label: Universal Music Japan; Formats: CD, digital download, streaming	15	-

==== Cover albums ====
Title	Album details	Peak chart positions	Sales (JPN)
Title	Album details	JPN Oricon	Sales (JPN)
Memories: Kahara Covers	Released: March 12, 2014; Label: Universal Music Japan; Formats: CD, digital download, streaming	10	-
Memories 2: Kahara All Time Covers	Released: October 1, 2014; Label: Universal Music Japan; Formats: CD, digital download, streaming	9	-
Memories 3: Kahara Back to 1995	Released: December 2, 2015; Label: Universal Music Japan; Formats: CD, digital download, streaming	30	-

== Videography ==
=== Live albums ===
No.	Release	Title	Formats
1st	December 12, 2001	Tomomi Kahala First Live	DVD, VHS
2nd	December 7, 2005	10th Anniversary Celebration Concert 2005	DVD, VHS

=== Music-videoclip albums ===
No.	Release	Title	Formats
1st	March 27, 2002	very best of Music Clips	VHS

== Publications ==
=== Books ===
- Mirai wo Shinjite - January 27, 2000
- Ku ari Raku ari: Mirai wo Shinjite Part 2 - July 25, 2001
- Showbiz - December 12, 2001
- Crystallize - December 20, 2005
- Crystallize II - March 27, 2006
