= Don't Wanna Cry (Namie Amuro song) =

Single by Namie Amuro

from the album Sweet 19 Blues
- B-side: "Present"
- Released: March 13, 1996
- Genre: Pop, dance, R&B
- Length: 4:40
- Label: Avex Trax
- Songwriter(s): Tetsuya Komuro; Takahiro Maeda; Cozy Kubo
- Producer(s): Tetsuya Komuro

Namie Amuro singles chronology
"Chase the Chance" (1995)	"Don't Wanna Cry" (1996)	"You're My Sunshine" (1996)

"Don't Wanna Cry" is a song by Japanese singer and record producer Namie Amuro released on the Avex Trax label, as her third single for her debut solo album Sweet 19 Blues (1996), It is her second consecutive million-selling single as well as her second consecutive number-one single. In December, the single took home the "Grand Prix Award" from the 38th Annual Japan Record Awards (analogous to Record of the Year from the Grammy Awards). 19 years old at the time, she is the youngest artist to have been awarded the grand prize.

== Commercial tie-in ==
"Don't Wanna Cry" was used in Daido Mistio commercials as its image song.

== Accolades ==
- Grand Prix Award (38th Annual Japan Record Awards)
- Best 5 Single Award (11th Japan Gold Disc Awards)

== Track listing ==
1. "Don't Wanna Cry (Radio Edit)" (Tetsuya Komuro, Takahiro Maeda) – 4:40
2. "Present" (Takahiro Maeda) – 4:39
3. "Don't Wanna Cry (Original Karaoke)" (Tetsuya Komuro) – 4:37
4. "Present (Original Karaoke)" (Takahiro Maeda) – 4:38

== Personnel ==
- Namie Amuro – vocals, background vocals

== Production ==
- Producer – Tetsuya Komuro
- Arranger – Tetsuya Komuro, Cozy Kubo
- Mixing – Chris Lord-Alge

== Charts ==
Oricon sales chart (Japan)

Release	Chart	Peak position	First week sales	Sales total
March 13, 1996	Oricon Weekly Singles Chart	1	323,910	1,389,700

Oricon sales chart (Japan)

Release	Chart	Position	Sales total
March 13, 1996	Oricon 1996 Year-End Chart	9	1,371,730

== TV performances ==
- December 31, 1996 – 38th Japan Record Awards
- December 31, 1996 &–; Kōhaku Uta Gassen
- June 5, 2006 – SMAPXSMAP
