= Koi no Cute Beat/Mister U.S.A. =

"Koi no Cute Beat / Mister U.S.A."

Single by Super Monkey's

from the album Original Tracks Vol.1
- Released: September 16, 1992
- Recorded: 1991
- Genre: J-Pop
- Length: 18:56
- Label: Toshiba-EMI
- Songwriters: Koi no Cute Beat - Minoru Komorita; Mister U.S.A.Masao Urino, Minoru Komorita

Super Monkey's singles chronology
"Koi no Cute Beat" / "Mister U.S.A." (1992)	"Dancing Junk" (1993)

"Koi no Cute Beat"/"Mister U.S.A." is the debut single from the Super Monkey's released under the Toshiba-EMI label. It is the only single by the group to be released under their original moniker. Three months after the release, their eldest member, Anna Makino, left the group.

== Music video ==
Although fans had copies of the music videos for the group's final three singles, the existence of music videos for the group's earliest singles were questionable until a low quality digital rip of "Mister U.S.A." surfaced on the internet from a Japanese website serving video files related to the group, MAX.

The music video appears to have been shot almost entirely in bluescreen except for one scene where the group performs a dance routine together. The remaining scenes of the video portrays the members of the group around the world in such locations as China and Egypt.

== Live performances and other usages ==
Namie Amuro first appeared on Downtown's Hey!Hey!Hey! Music Champ in March 1995. However, her first on-air meeting with the comedic duo was during one of their earlier TV programs in 1992 where she performed "Mister U.S.A." with the rest of the group. "Koi no Cute Beat" was featured as the ending theme to the variety program, Kuizu Sekai wa Show by Shobbai!! and "Mister U.S.A." was used in a commercial for Lotte cereal ice. The group showed in the commercials in what was their first major endorsement deal. They would go on to do subsequent commercials for the company.

== Track listing ==
1. "Koi no Cute Beat" (Minoru Komorita) - 4:59
2. "Mister U.S.A." (Masao Urino, Minoru Komorita) - 4:31
3. "Koi no Cute Beat (Original Karaoke)" (Minoru Komorita) - 4:59
4. "Mister U.S.A. (Original Karaoke)" (Minoru Komorita) - 4:27

== Personnel ==
- Namie Amuro - vocals, background vocals
- Anna Makino - vocals, background vocals
- Hisako Arakaki - background vocals
- Minako Ameku - background vocals
- Nanako Takushi - background vocals

== Charts ==
Oricon Sales Chart (Japan)

Release	Chart	Peak position	Sales total	Chart run
16 September 1992	Oricon Weekly Singles Chart	29	36,610	5 weeks
