= Taiyou no Season =

"Taiyou no SEASON"

Single by Namie Amuro

from the album Dance Tracks Vol. 1
- Released: April 26, 1995
- Recorded: 1995
- Genre: Pop, Electronic, Hi-NRG, Eurobeat
- Label: EMI Music Japan
- Songwriters: Suzuki Keimi; HINOKY TEAM; Dave Rodgers
- Producer: Max Matsuura

Namie Amuro singles chronology
"Try Me (Watashi o Shinjite)" (1995)	"Taiyou no SEASON" (1995)	"Stop the music" (1995)

"Taiyo no Season" (in Japanese : 太陽のSEASON) is the first single under the sole name of Japanese recording artist Namie Amuro. It was released on April 26, 1995, through EMI Music Japan. Effectively, the song marks Amuro's debut as a soloist. Although the single was released solely credited to "Namie Amuro", the back cover of the CD single shows "Namie Amuro with SUPER MONKEY'S" along with a photo of SUPER MONKEY'S (now MAX), who also appeared on music programs together under the same credit. "Taiyou no SEASON" was used as an advertising jingle for the Lotte's Crepe Ice commercials. "Taiyou no SEASON" was included on both the SUPER MONKEYS' Original Tracks Vol. 1 and Amuro's first greatest hits album 181920. A "NEW ALBUM MIX" was placed on the Dance Tracks Vol.1.

== Composition ==
Following the huge success of the previous song "Try Me (Watashi o Shinjite)," this was the second Eurobeat track to be released. The song is a Japanese language cover of Eurobeat artist Veronica Sales' song "Seasons". Meanwhile, the b-side is also a Japanese cover of the song "Burning Love", originally sung by Eurobeat artist D-Essex. The echoing vocals and rushing melody of "Taiyou no SEASON" give the song a sense of seasonality and speed, as if the listener is driving a convertible car along the seaside in the middle of summer.

== Commercial performance ==
"Taiyou no SEASON" debuted at number eight on the Oricon Singles Chart, with 69,750 copies sold in its first week. On its second week the single jumped to number five on the chart, selling 95,430 copies. It dropped to number ten the next week, selling 70,860 copies. The single stayed at number ten for a second consecutive week during its fourth week of availability, shifting 90,950 copies. "Taiyou no SEASON" then slid to number thirteen, selling 64,720 copies. Afterwards the single then lingered in the top twenty for the next three weeks, respectively ranking at number fifteen, number seventeen, and number twenty, before vanishing from the top twenty entirely on its ninth week of availability. "Taiyou no SEASON" was the fifty-sixth best-selling single in Japan of 1995. The single charted in the top 100 for seventeen weeks and sold a reported total of 610,680 copies.

== Track listing ==
All lyrics written by Keimi Suzuki, all music composed by HINOKY TEAM, all music arranged by Dave Rodgers
No.	Title	Length
1.	"Taiyou no SEASONS" (太陽のSEASON, "The Sun's Season")	3:23
2.	"Heart ni Hi wo Tsukete" (ハートに火をつけて, "Burning Fire in My Heart")	3:23
3.	"Taiyou no SEASON (ORIGINAL KARAOKE)"	3:23
4.	"Heart ni Hi wo Tsukete (ORIGINAL KARAOKE)"	3:23

== Charts ==
Chart (1995)	Peak position
Japan Weekly Singles (Oricon)	5
Japan Monthly Singles (Oricon)	10
Japan Yearly Singles (Oricon)	56

== Certification and sales ==
Region	Certification	Certified units/sales
Japan (RIAJ)	Platinum	610,680
