= Okinawa Actors School =

Japanese Performing Arts School

- 沖縄アクターズスクール

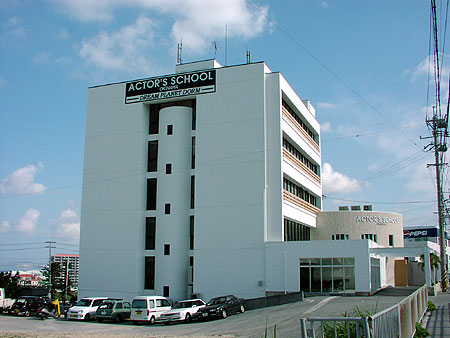
- The school’s historic building in Ginowan

Location
- 1-1-1 Kumoji; Naha, Okinawa Prefecture, 900-0015; Japan; 26°12′50″N 127°40′45″E

Information
- Type: Performing arts school
- Established: 1983
- Website: o-actors.com

Okinawa Actors School (沖縄アクターズスクール, Okinawa Akutāzu Sukūru) is a performing arts school in Okinawa, Japan which has another branch in Osaka. It was founded in 1983 by Masayuki Makino who became the first principal of the school. Many of the school's former students became popular J-pop stars especially in the 1990s. The school previously enrolled only local Okinawans before expanding its enrollment to the entire country in 1998.

By 2008, Okinawa Actors School was based in Ōyama, Ginowan, Okinawa. Following the school's revival, a new lesson studio opened at Palette Kumoji in Naha in 2023.

== Notable alumni ==
- Namie Amuro
- Hitoe Arakaki
- Rina Chinen
- D&D
- Da Pump
- Nanako Takushi
- Folder 5
- Gwinko
- Asuka Hinoi
- Hisako Arakaki
- Eriko Imai
- Meisa Kuroki
- Olivia Lufkin
- Anna Makino
- Ritsuko Matsuda
- MAX
- Misono
- Daichi Miura
- Reina Miyauchi
- Hikari Mitsushima
- Hiroko Shimabukuro
- Minako Inoue
- Speed
- Super Monkey's
- Takako Uehara
- Yu Yamada
