= 181920 =

Greatest hits album by Namie Amuro
- Released: January 28, 1998
- Genre: Pop, dance-pop
- Label: Avex Trax
- Producer: Tetsuya Komuro; Dave Rodgers; Claudio Accatino; Federico Rimonti; Laurent Gelmetti; Roberto Gabrielli

Namie Amuro chronology
Concentration 20 (1997)	181920 (1998)	Genius 2000 (2000)

Singles from 181920
- 1. "Dreaming I Was Dreaming" Released: November 27, 1997

181920 is the debut greatest hits album by Japanese singer Namie Amuro. Avex Trax released it in Japan on January 28, 1998, and it was later available in a variety of formats throughout Asia. The album contains Amuro's single releases from her debut studio album Dance Tracks Vol. 1 (1995) to her third album Concentration 20 (1997), as well as three tracks from her time with Toshiba-EMI. The album also included a new song called "Dreaming I Was Dreaming," which served as the only single from the album.

Music critics gave the album 181920 favorable reviews, praising its overall sound but finding the material insufficient. The Japan Gold Disc Awards also recognised the album as Pop Album of the Year that same year. Commercially, the album was a huge success in Japan, reaching number one on the Oricon Albums Chart and being certified double million by the Recording Industry Association of Japan (RIAJ) for sales of more than two million copies. After the album's campaign concluded, Amuro took a brief hiatus for maternity reasons.

== Content and material ==
181920 is Amuro's debut greatest hits album as a solo artist. (Note: Original Tracks Vol. 1 (1996) was a compilation album by Japanese girl group Super Monkey's, which included Amuro, though some markets and the album artwork billed as Namie Amuro with the Super Monkeys.) The album contains Amuro's single releases from her debut studio album, Dance Tracks Vol. 1 (1995), to her third album, Concentration 20 (1997). The album also features three songs from her time with Toshiba-EMI: "Try Me (Watashi o Shinjite)", "Taiyou no Season", and "Stop the Music". These three songs were recorded with the Japanese girl group Super Monkeys and released on the compilation Original Tracks Vol. 1 (1996). However, each song was completely reworked and recorded specifically for Amuro on Dance Tracks Vol. 1.

181920 features 12 tracks, including "high-energy electro-pop songs" and two ballads, "Can You Celebrate?" and "Dreaming I Was Dreaming," the latter being a new track for the album. Stylistically, the album focuses on various dance-oriented sounds, including eurobeat ("Try Me (Watashi o Shinjite)", "Chase the Chance"), standard dance-pop ("Body Feels Exit", "You're My Sunshine", "How to Be a Girl", "Stop the Music"), and ballad-inspired tracks ("Sweet 19 Blues", "Can You Celebrate?", "Dreaming I Was Dreaming").

== Release and promotion ==
Avex Trax first released 181920 in Japan on January 28, 1998, and later distributed in Hong Kong and Taiwan the same year. On July 1, a VHS and laserdisc format titled 181920 Films (1998) was released, containing most of the music videos from the album. The standard album was re-issued in Taiwan on September 29. In 2004, the album was re-released in all three territories, with a DVD album format and additional DVD disc that contained the music videos from 181920 Films. In 2012, the original format was re-issued to commemorate Amuro's 20th career anniversary in the entertainment business.

"Dreaming I Was Dreaming" is the album's only single. It was released a year earlier, on November 27, 1997, as a mini CD, and served as the commercial theme for Ginza Jewellery in Japan. It features a sample of T. Rex's "Liquid Generation" song. Commercially, it was a success in Japan, reaching number one on the Oricon Singles Chart and received double platinum certification from the Recording Industry Association of Japan (RIAJ) for shipments of over 800,000 units.

== Reception ==
Professional ratings
Review scores
Source	Rating
AllMusic	3.5/5 stars

Music critics complimented 181920. Ted Mills of AllMusic gave the album three and a half stars. Mills questioned the timing of its release, believing it was "premature to have a singles collection out so soon" and unusual given that it coincided with the rise of other Japanese singers, particularly Ayumi Hamasaki. Nonetheless, Mills stated that the material was "superior," but that it was a "short summation of the sound that changed J-Pop, circa 1996." In addition, the album won Pop Album of the Year at the Japan Gold Disc Awards in 1998.

Commercially, the album was a massive success in Japan. It debuted at number one on the Oricon Albums Chart, selling 857,100 units in its first week of release. It remained at number one for a second week, selling an additional 326,270 copies. The album spent 35 weeks on the charts and was the eleventh best-selling album of the year. Since its release, 1,693,465 copies have been sold in the region. It was certified double million by the RIAJ for exceeding sales of two million units. According to Oricon Style, 181920 is Amuro's fifth best-selling album overall. It is also the 74th best-selling album in Japan for the 1990s decade.

== Track listing ==
No.	Title	Length
1.	"Body Feels Exit"	4:22
2.	"Try Me (Watashi wo Shinjite)"	3:57
3.	"Chase the Chance"	4:31
4.	"Taiyou no Season"	3:30
5.	"You're My Sunshine"	5:46
6.	"How to Be a Girl"	4:26
7.	"Sweet 19 Blues"	5:36
8.	"Dreaming I Was Dreaming"	5:10
9.	"Stop the Music"	3:37
10.	"A Walk in the Park"	5:38
11.	"Don't Wanna Cry"	5:39
12.	"Can You Celebrate?"	6:21
Total length:		58:33

181920 & Films
No.	Title	Director(s)	Length
1.	"Opening"
2.	"Body Feels Exit" (Music video)	Masashi Muto
3.	"Chase the Chance" (Music video)	Norihiro Akita
4.	"Don't Wanna Cry" (Music video)	Norihiro Akita
5.	"You're My Sunshine" (Music video)	Shuichi Tan
6.	"A Walk In The Park" (Music video)	Masashi Muto
7.	"Can You Celebrate?" (Music video)	Wataru Takeishi
8.	"How to Be a Girl" (Music video)	Masashi Muto
9.	"Dreaming I Was Dreaming" (Music video)	Masashi Muto

== Credits and personnel ==
Credits adapted from the liner notes of 181920.

Musicians

- Namie Amuro – main vocals, background vocals
- Tetsuya Komuro - vocals, background vocals

Production

- Tetsuya Komuro - arranger, composer, producer, songwriter
- Hinoky Team - composer
- Dave Rodgers - arranger
- Claudio Accatino - composer
- Federico Rimonti - composer
- Laurent Gelmetti - composer
- Roberto Gabrielli - composer
- Kazumi Suzuki - songwriter
- Jonny Taira - producer
- Masato "Max" Matsuura - producer
- Marc Panther - songwriter
- Cozy Kubo - arranger, composer
- Yasuhiko Hoshino - arranger
- Natsumi Watanabe - songwriter
- Takahiro Maeda - songwriter

Imagery

- Tycoon Graphics - art director(s), designers
- Itaru Hirama - photographer
- Kyoko Tsunoda - styling
- Katsuma Yokoyama - Hair and makeup

Management

- Masato "Max" Matsuura - executive producer
- Shinji Hayashi - general producer
- Katsuro Oshita - general producer
- Yuichi Orimoto - production manager
- Kimi Sato - production coordinator
- Tetsuya Uekata - production coordinator
- Kazumi Yanagi - A&R chief
- Kengo Goto - A&R
- Takashi Kasuga - public relations
- Yukio Takemura - public relations
- Tatsuya Ikeda - public relations
- Jonny Taira - supervisor
- Tom Yoda - specially coordinator
- Akira Kobayashi - Rising Production management representative
- Masayuki Okura - Rising Production management representative
- Shigeo Maruyama - Tetsuya Komuro management representative
- Shigeo Ohtake - Tetsuya Komuro management representative

== Charts ==
=== Weekly charts ===
Chart (1998)	Peak position
Japanese Albums (Oricon)	1

=== Year-end charts ===
Chart (1998)	Position
Japanese Albums (Oricon)	11

=== Decade-end charts ===
Chart (1990–1999)	Position
Japanese Albums (Oricon)	74

=== All-time chart ===
Chart	Peak position
Japanese Albums (Oricon)	109

== Certifications ==
Region	Certification	Certified units/sales
Japan (RIAJ)	2× Million	1,693,465

== Release history ==
181920 release history
Region	Date	Format	Label	Ref(s).
Japan	January 28, 1998	CD	Avex Trax	
Hong Kong	1998	CD	Avex Trax	
Taiwan	1998	CD	Avex Trax	
Japan	January 28, 2004	CD; DVD audio	Avex Trax	
Hong Kong	January 28, 2004	CD+DVD	Avex Trax	
Taiwan	January 28, 2004	CD+DVD	Avex Trax	
Japan	2012	CD	Avex Trax	
Various	N/A	Digital download; streaming	Avex Trax	

== See also ==
- List of Oricon number-one albums of 1998
