= Original Tracks Vol. 1 =

- Cover artwork was used for CD/VCD and digital platforms

Compilation album by Super Monkey's
- Released: 30 September 1996
- Genre: Dance
- Label: Toshiba-EMI; USM

Namie Amuro chronology
Sweet 19 Blues (1996)	Original Tracks Vol. 1 (1996)	Concentration 20 (1997)

Original Tracks Vol. 1 is the first and only compilation album released by Super Monkey's, compiling all the singles and B-sides that had been released. The album was released by Toshiba-EMI on 30 September 1996, and was certified platinum by the RIAJ for 400,000 copies shipped. The album was also marketed with the group's other name, "Namie Amuro with Super Monkey's".

This is the last album released by Super Monkey's before Amuro made her solo debut with Avex Trax in 1995, and Minako Inoue, Nanako Takushi, Reina Miyauchi, and Ritsuko Matsuda formed MAX with Avex Trax in 1995.

== Release ==
"Dancing Junk" was used as the first ending theme to the anime series Nintama Rantarō. It peaked on Oricon Weekly Singles Chart at number 68, selling 18,660 copies in 4 weeks.

In March 2018, Universal Music Japan announced that they would release a remastered version of the album on the SHM-CD format on May 2, 2018.

== Track listing ==
1. Mister U.S.A. (Super Monkey's)
2. Koi no Cute Beat (Super Monkey's)
3. Dancing Junk (Super Monkey's 4)
4. Rainbow Moon (Super Monkey's 4)
5. Aishite Masukatto (Super Monkey's 4)
6. Wagamama wo Yurushite (Super Monkey's 4)
7. Paradise Train (Namie Amuro with Super Monkey's)
8. Kanashiki Broken Boy (Namie Amuro with Super Monkey's)
9. Try me ~watashi wo shinjite~ (Namie Amuro with Super Monkey's)
10. Memories ~ashita no tame ni~ (Namie Amuro with Super Monkey's)
11. Taiyou no Season (Namie Amuro with Super Monkey's)
12. Heart ni hi wo Tsukete (Namie Amuro with Super Monkey's)
13. Stop the Music (Namie Amuro with Super Monkey's)
14. Good-night (Namie Amuro with Super Monkey's)
