= Yukiko Todoroki =

Japanese actress (1917–1967)

- 轟 夕起子
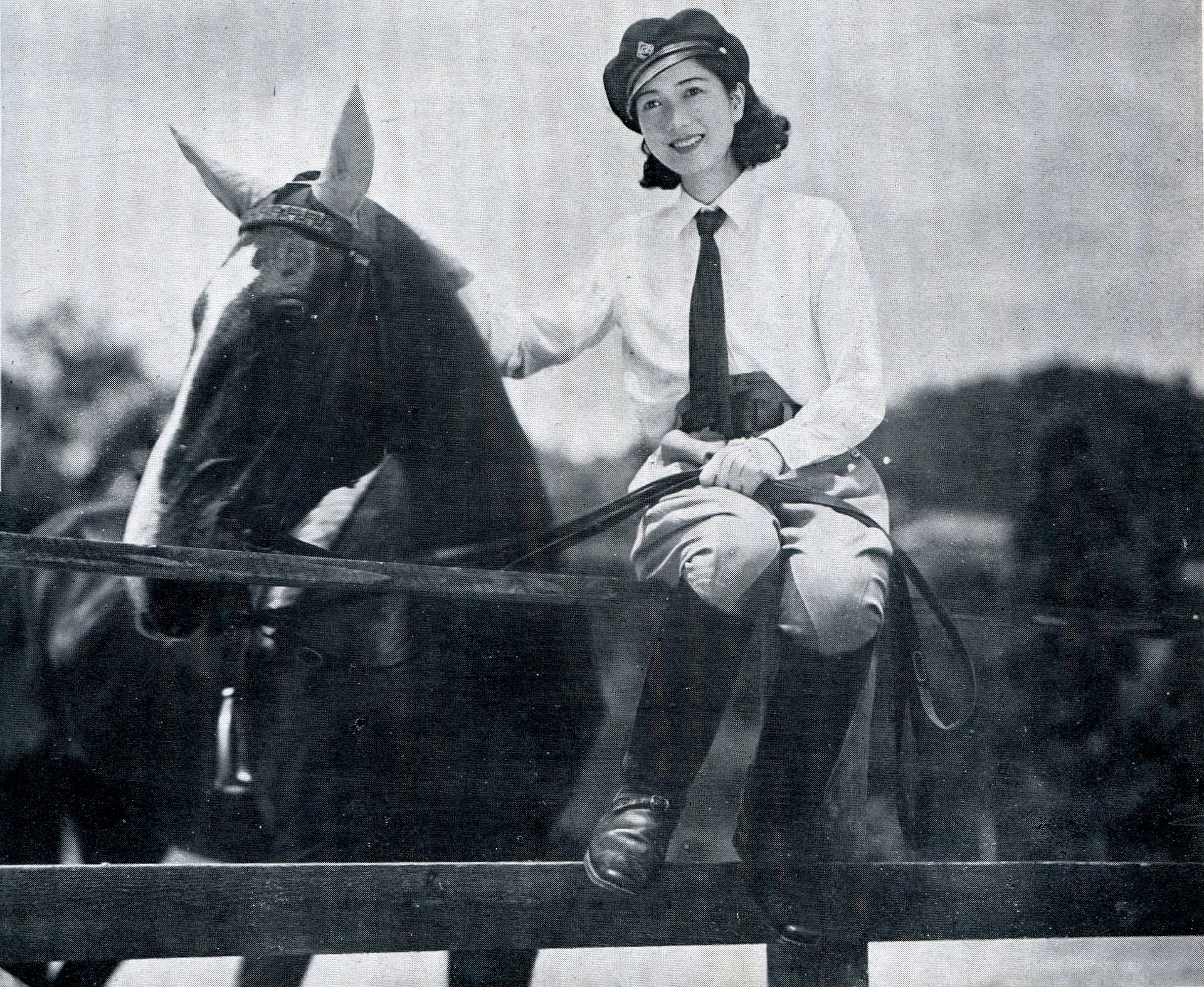
- Todoroki in 1937
- Born: September 11, 1917; Shinbori-chou, Azabu-ku, Tokyo, Japan
- Died: May 11, 1967 (aged 49); Komae, Tokyo, Japan
- Occupation: Actress
- Years active: 1937–1967
- Spouses: Masahiro Makino (m. 1940; div. 1950); Koji Shima (m. 1953; div. 1965)
- Children: 1
- Relatives: Anna Makino (granddaughter)

Yukiko Todoroki (轟 夕起子 Todoroki Yukiko; September 11, 1917 – May 11, 1967) was a Japanese actress. Her real name was Tsuruko Nishiyama. She participated in the Takarazuka Revue. At Takarazuka, she was known not by her real name, but by the stage name Toruko (Turquoise or Turk). Her birthplace was Shinbori, Azabu-ku in Tokyo. Her two ex-husbands were film directors Masahiro Makino and Koji Shima. Her son is Masayuki Makino, the principal of Okinawa Actors School. Anna Makino, a former member of idol group Super Monkey's, is her granddaughter.

== History and personal life ==
In 1931, she left Kyoto Prefectural Suzaku Senior High School to join the Takarazuka Revue. Shidare Itoi and Tomiko Hattori also joined the company at the same time. These Japanese beauties became very popular. In 1937, she left Takarazuka and had her debut as Otsu in the Nikkatsu production Musashi Miyamoto: Earth Scroll. It is said this was revenge by the four existing film companies (Shochiku, Nikkatsu, Shinko Cinema, and Daito Film) against Toho's Kazuo Hasegawa. While shooting Edo no Arawashi (1937), she met Nikkatsu director Masahiro Makino. She married him in 1940. The same year, her eldest son, Masayuki Makino, was born.

In 1942, due to government intervention, Nikkatsu's production division was forced to merge with other companies to form Daiei Studios. However, Todoroki did not join Daiei; she moved to Toho, to which her husband Makino was then attached.

In 1943, she gained popularity for portraying the heroine Sayo Murai in Akira Kurosawa's debut film, Sanshiro Sugata. That same year she had a hit with the theme song to Hanako-san, Otsukai wa jitensha ni notte.

After the war, she divorced Makino (1950), married Koji Shima (1953), then divorced him (1965). In the post-war period, she gained weight and was gradually forced into supporting roles. For example, she played Hideki Takahashi's mother in the television series Otoko no monshō from 1963 to 1966.

On May 11, 1967, at 17:15, she died in Komae, Tokyo of post-hepatic jaundice. She was 49 years old.

== Selected filmography ==
- 1937 Musashi Miyamoto: Earth Scroll - directed by Jun Ozaki (尾崎純)
- 1939 Kagirinaki zenshin - directed by Tomu Uchida
- 1939 Bakuon - directed by Tomotaka Tasaka
- 1940 Zoku Shimizu minato - directed by Masahiro Makino
- 1941 Jiro monogatari - directed by Koji Shima
- 1943 Hanako-san - directed by Masahiro Makino
- 1943 Sanshiro Sugata - directed by Akira Kurosawa
- 1945 Sanshiro Sugata Part II - directed by Akira Kurosawa
- 1946 Nanatsu no kao - directed by Sadatsugu Matsuda, part of the Bannai Tarao series
- 1948 Kinji Kiyasha zengohen - directed by Masahiro Makino
- 1948 Body at the Gate - directed by Masahiro Makino
- 1950 Mada kara tobidase - directed by Koji Shima
- 1950 Sasameyuki - directed by Yutaka Abe
- 1951 The Lady of Musashino - directed by Kenji Mizoguchi
- 1953 Life of a Woman
- 1954 Kyokubatan no maou - directed by Yasushi Sasaki, part of the Bannai Tarao series
- 1955 Seishun kaidan - directed by Kon Ichikawa
- 1955 The Maid's Kid - directed by Tomotaka Tasaka
- 1956 Hungry Soul - directed by Kon Ichikawa
- 1956 Hungry Soul, Part II - directed by Kon Ichikawa
- 1956 Suzaki Paradise: Akashingō - directed by Yūzō Kawashima
- 1956 A Slope in the Sun - directed by Tomotaka Tasaka
- 1958 Akai hatoba - directed by Toshio Masuda
- 1959 Sasameyuki - directed by Koji Shima
- 1959 Temptation on Glamour Island - directed by Yuuzou Kawashima
- 1961 Aitsu to watashi - directed by Kō Nakahira

== Television ==
- Sore wa watashi desu (NHK)

== See also ==
- Takarazuka Revue
- Nikkatsu
- Toho
