= Dreaming I Was Dreaming =

"Dreaming I was Dreaming"

Single by Namie Amuro

from the album 181920
- Released: November 27, 1997
- Genre: Pop
- Length: 5:11
- Label: Avex Trax
- Songwriter(s): MARC; Tetsuya Komuro; Cozy Kubo
- Producer(s): Tetsuya Komuro

Namie Amuro singles chronology
| "How to Be a Girl" (1997) | "Dreaming I was Dreaming" (1997) | "I Have Never Seen" (1998) |

"Dreaming I was Dreaming" is Namie Amuro's eleventh single on the Avex Trax label. Released after the announcement of her pregnancy and marriage to SAM of the group, TRF, it debuted at #1 on December 8, 1997. The single does not appear on any of Amuro's original albums but does appear on her first compilation album, 181920 (1998). The song samples the T. Rex song "Liquid Gang" from their 1974 album Zinc Alloy and the Hidden Riders of Tomorrow. It was her last original single before taking a year leave in 1998. The single was certified double platinum by the RIAJ for 800,000 copies shipped to stores.

== Commercial endorsements ==
"Dreaming I was Dreaming" was used in a television campaign commercial for Ginza Jewelry Maker Estate Twin Jewelry.

== Track listing ==
1. "Dreaming I was Dreaming (Straight Run)" (Marc, Tetsuya Komuro, Cozy Kubo) – 5:11
2. "Dreaming I was Dreaming (congratulations)" (Remixed by Joe Chiccarelli) – 6:35
3. "Dreaming I was Dreaming (Instrumental)" (Cozy Kubo) – 5:09

== Personnel ==
- Namie Amuro – vocals, background vocals
- Tetsuya Komuro – piano

== Production ==
- Producer – Tetsuya Komuro
- Arrangement – Cozy Kubo
- Mixing – Dave Way
- Remixing – Joe Chiccarelli

== Charts ==
Oricon Sales Chart (Japan)

| Release | Chart | Peak position | First week sales | Sales total |
|---|---|---|---|---|
| November 27, 1997 | Oricon Weekly Singles Chart | 1 | 204,530 | 558,830 |

Oricon Sales Chart (Japan)

| Release | Chart | Position | Sales total |
|---|---|---|---|
| November 27, 1997 | Oricon 1998 Year-End Chart | 42 | 558,830 |
