= Aishite Muscat =

Single by Super Monkey's 4
- Language: Japanese
- English title: I Love Muscat
- B-side: "Wagamama wo Yurushite"
- Released: November 5, 1993
- Genre: J-pop; dance-pop
- Length: 18:29
- Label: Toshiba-EMI
- Songwriter(s): Neko Oikawa; Minoru Komorita

Super Monkey's 4 singles chronology
"Dancing Junk" (1993)	"Aishite Muscat" (1993)	"Paradise Train" (1994)

"Aishite Muscat" (愛してマスカット, Aishite Masukatto; lit. "I Love Muscat") is a song by Super Monkey's, released as the second single under the moniker Super Monkey 4, and their third single in total. The b-side to the single is yet another Namie Amuro solo, "Wagamama wo Yurushite." The title track first appeared in a chewing gum commercial before the release of their second single, "Dancing Junk" (1993).

== Commercial endorsements ==
The a-side was used in commercials for Lotte Mascot Gum which starred the group. One commercial was shot while their original group leader, Anna Makino, was still a part of the group. A second commercial featuring the remaining members playing soccer aired during the release of the single.

== Track listing ==
All lyrics are written by Neko Oikawa; all music is composed and arranged by Minoru Komorita.

8cm CD single
No.	Title	Length
1.	"Aishite Muscat" (Aishite Masukatto (愛してマスカット; "I Love Muscat"))	4:06
2.	"Wagamama wo Yurushite" ((わがままを許して; "Forgive Selfishness"))	5:09
3.	"Aishite Muscat" (Original Karaoke)	4:06
4.	"Wagamama wo Yurushite" (Original Karaoke)	5:06
Total length:		18:29

== Personnel ==
- Namie Amuro - vocals, background vocals
- Hisako Arakaki - background vocals
- Minako Ameku - background vocals
- Nanako Takushi - background vocals

== Charts ==
Oricon Sales Chart (Japan)

Release	Chart	Peak Position	Sales Total	Chart Run
5 November 1993	Oricon Weekly Singles Chart	#67	10,530	2 weeks
