= Namie Amuro Final Tour 2018 Finally =

2017–2018 concert tour by Namie Amuro

Namie Amuro Final Tour 2018 ~Finally~
- Tour by Namie Amuro
- Associated album: Finally
- Start date: September 16, 2017
- End date: June 3, 2018
- Legs: 2
- No. of shows: 25

Namie Amuro concert chronology
- Live Style Tour (2016–17); Final Tour 2018 Finally (2017–18)

The Namie Amuro Final Tour 2018 ~Finally~ was the 21st and final concert tour by Japanese recording artist Namie Amuro. In September 2017, Amuro held a two-day concert titled the "25th Anniversary Live in Okinawa" in front of 52,000 people at the Ginowan Seaside Park in Ginowan, Okinawa. She subsequently embarked on a dome tour beginning at the Vantelin Dome Nagoya on February 17, 2018. The tour concluded on June 3, 2018, at the Tokyo Dome.

The Final Tour 2018 Finally marked Amuro's last concert tour before her retirement and attracted over 750,000 people in Japan and 50,000 people in China, Hong Kong and Taiwan. The tour broke the record for the most-attended concert tour of all time by a J-pop solo artist. A live concert DVD and blu-ray was released on August 29, 2018, which peaked at number one on the Oricon DVD and blu-ray chart. The DVD and blu-ray releases sold over 1.6 million combined copies.

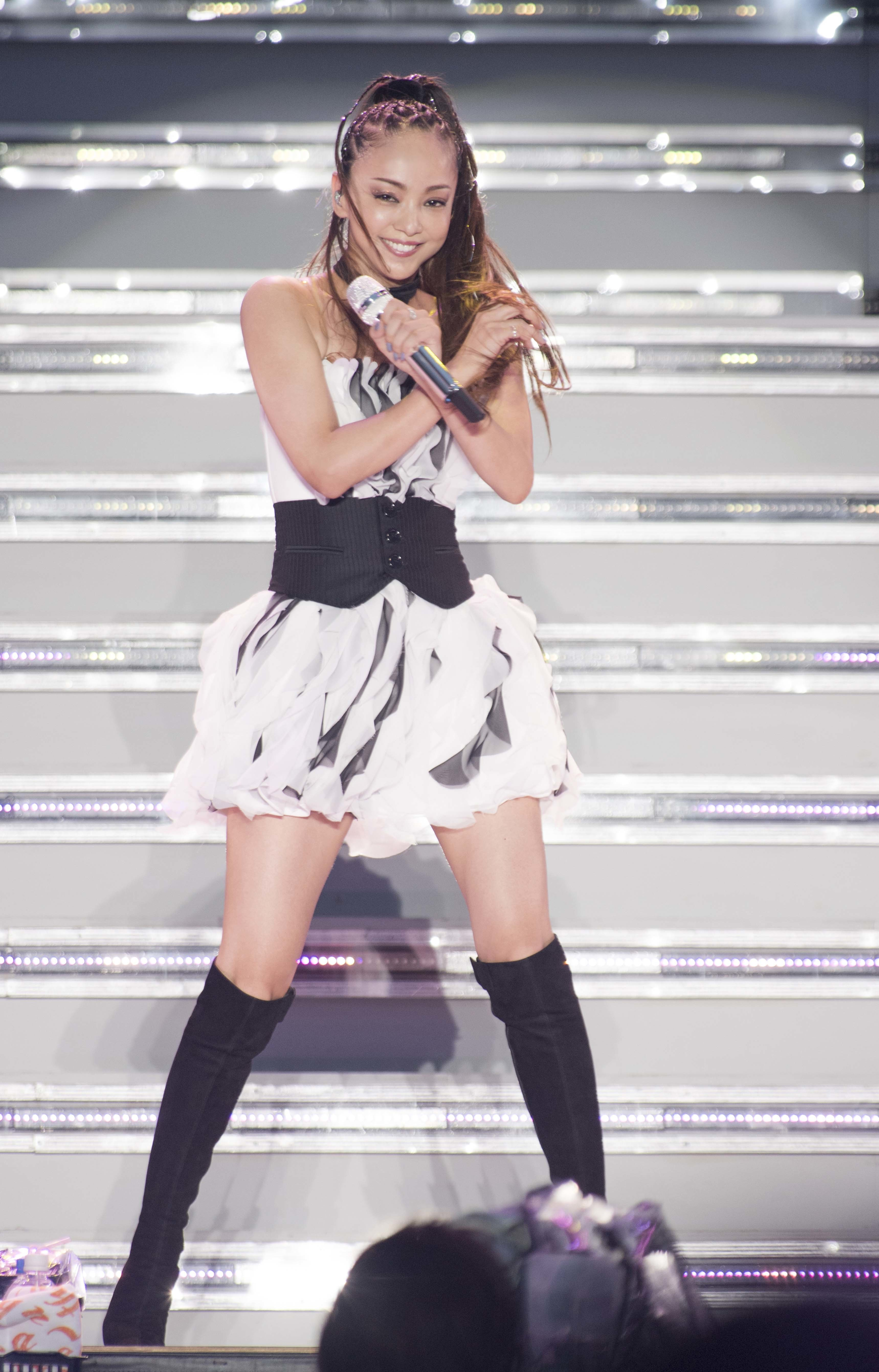
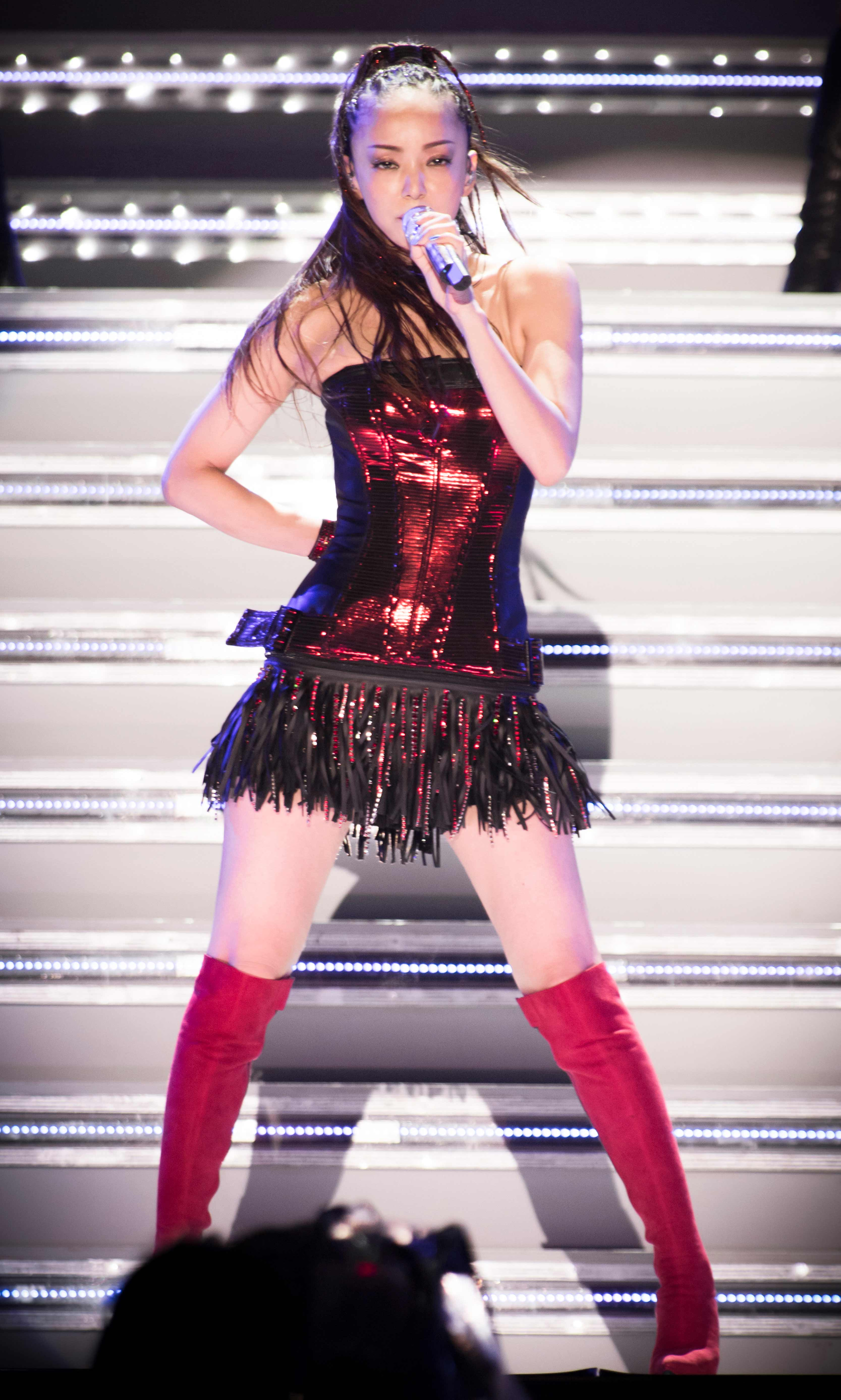
Amuro performing during her 25th Anniversary Live in Okinawa

== Set list ==
This is set list is from the show at the Tokyo Dome on June 3, 2018. It is not intended to represent all the shows from the tour.

1. "Hero"
2. "Hide and Seek"
3. "Do Me More"
4. "Mint"
5. "Baby Don't Cry"
6. "Girl Talk"
7. "New Look"
8. "What a Feeling"
9. "Showtime"
10. "Just You and I"
11. "Break It"
12. "Say the Word"
13. "Love Story"
14. "Sweet 19 Blues"
15. "Try Me (Watashi o Shinjite)"
16. "Taiyou no Season"
17. "You're My Sunshine"
18. "Get Myself Back"
19. "A Walk in the Park"
20. "Don't Wanna Cry"
21. "Never End"
22. "Can You Celebrate?"
23. "Body Feels Exit"
24. "Chase the Chance"
25. "Fighter"
26. "In Two"
27. "Do It For Love"

Encore

1. "Hope"
2. "Finally"
3. "How Do You Feel Now?"

== Tour dates ==
25th Anniversary Live in Okinawa
| Date (2017) | City | Country | Venue | Attendance |
|---|---|---|---|---|
| September 16 | Ginowan | Japan | Ginowan Seaside Park | 52,000 |
| September 17 | Ginowan | Japan | Ginowan Seaside Park | 52,000 |

Finally Tour 2018
| Date (2018) | City | Country | Venue | Attendance |
|---|---|---|---|---|
| February 17 | Nagoya | Japan | Vantelin Dome Nagoya | 750,000 (Note: The attendance figure is combined from all 17 dome concerts held in Japan throughout the tour.) |
| February 18 | Nagoya | Japan | Vantelin Dome Nagoya | 750,000 |
| February 24 | Fukuoka | Japan | Fukuoka Yahuoku! Dome | 750,000 |
| February 25 | Fukuoka | Japan | Fukuoka Yahuoku! Dome | 750,000 |
| February 27 | Fukuoka | Japan | Fukuoka Yahuoku! Dome | 750,000 |
| March 17 | Shenzhen | China | Shenzhen Bay Sports Center | 30,000 |
| March 18 | Shenzhen | China | Shenzhen Bay Sports Center | 30,000 |
| March 30 | Hong Kong | | Hong Kong Coliseum | 30,000 |
| March 31 | Hong Kong | | Hong Kong Coliseum | 30,000 |
| April 14 | Sapporo | Japan | Sapporo Dome | |
| April 15 | Sapporo | Japan | Sapporo Dome | |
| April 21 | Osaka | Japan | Kyocera Dome Osaka | |
| April 22 | Osaka | Japan | Kyocera Dome Osaka | |
| April 25 | Osaka | Japan | Kyocera Dome Osaka | |
| April 26 | Osaka | Japan | Kyocera Dome Osaka | |
| May 2 | Tokyo | Japan | Tokyo Dome | |
| May 3 | Tokyo | Japan | Tokyo Dome | |
| May 5 | Tokyo | Japan | Tokyo Dome | |
| May 6 | Tokyo | Japan | Tokyo Dome | |
| May 19 | Taipei | Taiwan | Taipei Arena | 22,000 |
| May 20 | Taipei | Taiwan | Taipei Arena | 22,000 |
| June 2 | Tokyo | Japan | Tokyo Dome | |
| June 3 | Tokyo | Japan | Tokyo Dome | |
| Total | | | | 854,000 |

== DVD ==
Namie Amuro Final Tour 2018 ~Finally~

Video by Namie Amuro
- Released: August 29, 2018
- Genre: Pop; R&B
- Label: Dimension Point

Namie Amuro chronology
| Namie Amuro Live Style 2016-2017 (2017) | Namie Amuro Final Tour 2018 ~Finally~ (2018) |

A concert album titled Namie Amuro Final Tour 2018 ~Finally~ was released as Namie Amuro's final concert DVD on August 29, 2018. The DVD and blu-ray releases sold over 1.7 million copies combined.

=== Charts ===
| Chart (2018) | Peak position |
|---|---|
| Japanese Blu-ray Chart (Oricon) | 1 |
| Japanese DVD Chart (Oricon) | 1 |

=== Sales and certifications ===
| Region | Certification | Certified units/sales |
|---|---|---|
| Japan (RIAJ) | Million | 1,674,000 |

== Accolades ==
| Year | Ceremony | Category | Result | Ref. |
|---|---|---|---|---|
| 2019 | CD Shop Awards | Special Prize | Won | |
| 2019 | Japan Blu-ray Awards | Grand Prix | Won | |
| 2019 | Japan Blu-ray Awards | Music Award | Won | |
| 2019 | Japan Gold Disc Awards | Best Music Video Award | Won | |
