= Dance Tracks Vol. 1 =

Dance Tracks Vol.1

Studio album / Remix album by Namie Amuro
- Released: 16 October 1995
- Genre: Eurobeat; dance-pop
- Length: 55:19
- Label: Toshiba-EMI
- Producer: Masato "Max" Matsuura; Yukihito Sakakibara

Namie Amuro chronology
Dance Tracks Vol.1 (1995)	Sweet 19 Blues (1996)

Dance Tracks Vol.1 is the debut studio album by Japanese singer Namie Amuro, released on 16 October 1995 as her only album with Toshiba-EMI. It features remixed material originally recorded with the idol group Super Monkey's, of which Amuro was a member at the time, as well as three original songs.

Nine days after Dance Tracks Vol.1 debuted, Amuro released her first single with Avex Trax, "Body Feels Exit", on 25 October 1995. The album reached the top position on the Oricon charts and charted for forty-four weeks.

The album is currently out of print, and is not listed in Amuro's official discography, along with her greatest hits album Original Tracks Vol. 1 (1996).

== Background and content ==
Released three months after the final Super Monkey's single, Dance Tracks Vol.1 could almost be classified as more of a remix album than an original album. Six out of the seven Super Monkey's singles appear on the album, all of which have been remixed. The album was originally scheduled to include four or five new songs, but because Amuro had a sore throat, the album was limited to three new songs: "Go! Go! (Yume no Hayasade)" (a cover of DJ NRG's "GO GO"), "Get My Shinin'," and "Super Luck!," and the rest were remixes of existing songs. Amuro later expressed regret for this in a 1996 interview, calling the album "a very half-baked album."

The other members of the Super Monkey's appear in the artwork of the album, but are not credited with any vocals. All seven original Super Monkey's singles were credited to both Amuro and the group. Following the massive success of this album and her next release, Sweet 19 Blues (1996) through Avex Trax, Toshiba-EMI released a "best of" compilation containing all original Super Monkey's a-sides and b-sides entitled, Original Tracks Vol.1 (1996).

== Reception ==
Dance Tracks Vol.1 debuted at number one on the Oricon Albums Chart, with 468,240 copies sold in its first week. It dropped to number two the next week, selling 132,540 copies. The album stayed in the top ten for ten nonconsecutive weeks, and charted in the top 300 for 44 weeks. Dance Tracks Vol.1 became the 21st best-selling album of 1995, selling 877,960 copies. It also sold 987,490 copies in 1996, becoming the 22nd best-selling album of that year. In the history of Japanese Oricon albums chart, Dance Tracks Vol.1 ranked at the 88th best selling album of all time, with cumulative physical sales of over 1.8 million copies. In 1996, the album was certified double million by the Recording Industry Association of Japan (RIAJ).

== Track listing ==
No.	Title	Lyrics	Music	Arranger(s)	Length
1.	"Go! Go! (Yume no Hayasade)"	Kayoko Ono	Giancarlo Pasquini; Luca Pernici	Yasuhiko Hoshino	4:50
2.	"Try Me (Watashi o Shinjite)" (New Album Mix)	Kazumi Suzuki	Hinoky Team	Dave Rodgers	4:04
3.	"Stop the Music" (New Album Mix)	Watanabe	Accatino-Rimonti-Gabrielli-Gelmetti	Yasuhiko Hoshino	3:51
4.	"Get My Shinin'"	Watanabe	Yasuhiko Hoshino	Yasuhiko Hoshino	4:02
5.	"Wagamama wo Yurushite" (Groovy Mix)	Neko Oikawa	Minoru Komorita	Minoru Komorita; Remixed by Yasuhiko Hoshino	5:00
6.	"Aishite Muscat" (Groovy Mix)	Neko Oikawa	Minoru Komorita	Minoru Komorita; Remixed by Yasuhiko Hoshino	4:04
7.	"Paradise Train" (Groovy Mix)	Masao Urino	Keizo Nakanishi	Takao Konishi; Remixed by Yasuhiko Hoshino	4:31
8.	"Dancing Junk" (Groovy Mix)	Masao Urino	Koji Makaino	Koji Makaino; Remixed by Yasuhiko Hoshino	4:47
9.	"Super Luck!"	Masumi Iizuka	Yasuhiko Hoshino	Yasuhiko Hoshino	3:56
10.	"Heart ni Hi o Tsukete" (New Album Mix)	Kazumi Suzuki	Hinoky Team	Dave Rodger	3:29
11.	"Taiyō no Season" (New Album Mix)	Kazumi Suzuki	Hinoky Team	Dave Rodgers	3:46
12.	"Try Me (Watashi o Shinjite)" (Extended Version) (Bonus track)	Kazumi Suzuki	Hinoky Team	Dave Rodgers; Edited by Takeshi "BUNTA" Matsumoto	5:11
13.	"Taiyō no Season" (Salsoulike Mix) (Bonus track)	Kazumi Suzuki	Hinoky Team	Dave Rodgers; Remixed by Satoshi Hidaka	3:30

== Personnel ==
- Namie Amuro - vocals, background vocals
- Producers - Masato 'Max' Masato, Yukihito Sakakibara
- Mixing - Naoki Yamada, Yoshinori Kaji, Koji Morimoto
- Remixing - Yasuhiko Hoshino, Satoshi Hidaka
- Photography - Takayuki Okada
- Art Direction - Kumiko Izumiya

== Charts ==
=== Weekly charts ===
Chart (1995–1996)	Peak position
Japanese Albums (Oricon)	1

=== Year-end charts ===
1999 year-end charts for First Love
Chart (1995)	Position
Japanese Albums (Oricon)	21

2000 year-end charts for First Love
Chart (1996)	Position
Japanese Albums (Oricon)	22

=== Decade-end charts ===
Chart (1990–1999)	Position
Japanese Albums (Oricon)	63

=== All-time chart ===
Chart	Position
Japanese Albums (Oricon)	88
