= Reina Miyauchi =

Japanese singer

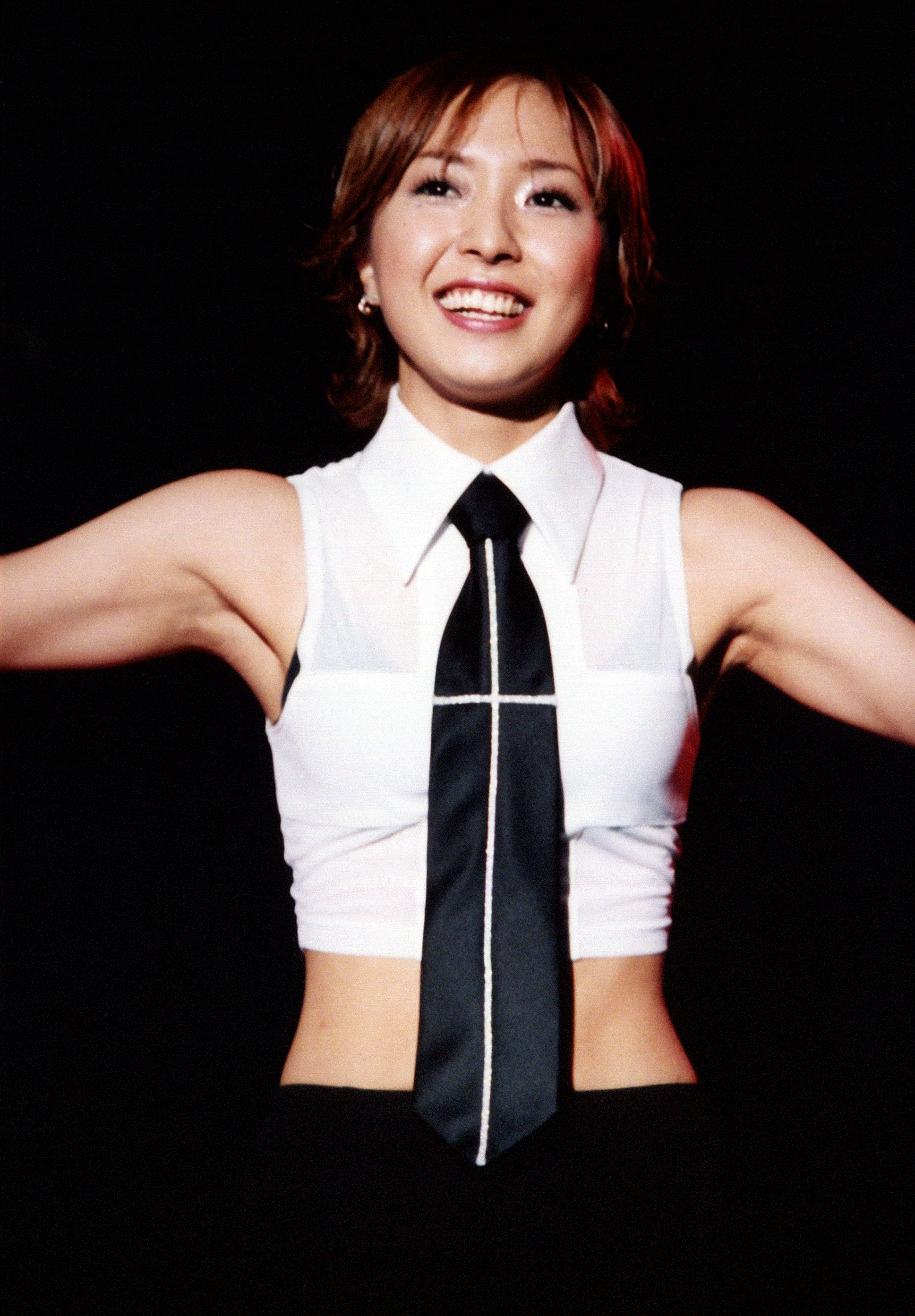
Reina Miyauchi in 1999

Reina Miyauchi (宮内 玲奈, Miyauchi Reina; born January 6, 1978) is a Japanese pop singer from Okinawa, Japan, and current member of the group MAX. She made her debut with the group Super Monkey's on 25 January 1995, and then, after the departure of Namie Amuro, she formed the group MAX with the remaining group members.

== See also ==
- Super Monkey's
- MAX
