= Namie Amuro =

Japanese singer (born 1977)

- 安室 奈美恵
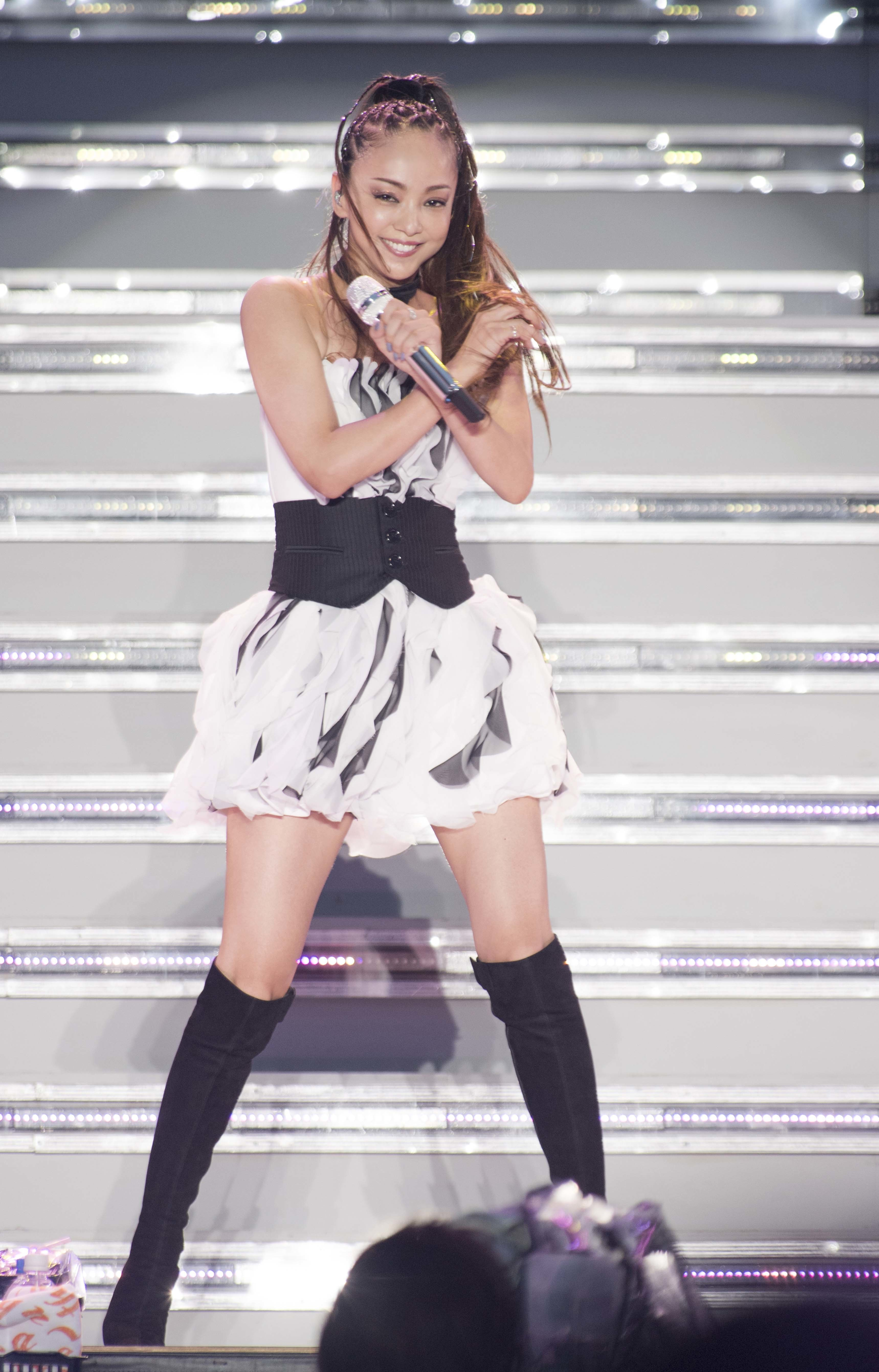
- Amuro at her 25th anniversary concert in Okinawa in September 2017
- Born: September 20, 1977 (age 49); Naha, Okinawa, Japan
- Other names: Namie Maruyama (legally, 1997–2002)
- Occupations: Singer; dancer; model; actress; entrepreneur; lyricist
- Years active: 1992–2018
- Works: Discography
- Spouse: Masaharu "Sam" Maruyama (m. 1997; div. 2002)
- Children: 1
- Musical career
- Genres: Pop; dance; R&B
- Instrument: Vocals
- Labels: Eastworld/Toshiba–EMI (1992–1995); Avex Trax (1995–2013); Dimension Point (2013–2018)
- Formerly of: Super Monkey's (1992–1995); Suite Chic (2002–2003)
- Website: namieamuro.jp

Namie Amuro (/ˌnɑːmiˈeɪ/ NAH-mee-AY; Japanese: 安室 奈美恵, romanized: Amuro Namie; born September 20, 1977) is a retired Japanese singer. She rose to prominence as a teen idol, and transitioned into a leading pop artist due to her versatility across music styles and visual presentation. Due to her career reinventions and longevity, she is known as an icon across Japan and Asia. She has been referred to as the "Queen of Japanese Pop", and her influence domestically has drawn comparisons to artists such as Janet Jackson and Madonna in Western pop culture.

Born in Naha, Okinawa, Amuro debuted as the lead singer of the idol group Super Monkey's in 1992 when she was 14 years old. Despite early sales disappointments, Amuro's rising popularity helped to score a major hit with the 1995 Eurobeat single "Try Me (Watashi o Shinjite)". Signing to Avex Trax for her solo career, Amuro catapulted to fame with a string of number one singles including "Chase the Chance" and "Don't Wanna Cry". A close partnership with renowned producer Tetsuya Komuro resulted in a dance-pop sound with Western influences. Her first four releases, including Sweet 19 Blues (1996) and Concentration 20 (1997), each received multi-million certifications. Her 1997 single "Can You Celebrate?" remains as the best selling single by a solo female artist in Japanese music history.

In the early 2000s, "Never End" became Amuro's last successful single before a decline in sales, and her music began evolving from pop to R&B as she reined in creative control of her career. This transition was marked by the Suite Chic project in 2002 and her sixth studio album Style (2003). Amuro's eighth studio album, Play (2007), with the hit single "Baby Don't Cry", began a period of commercial resurgence. Her comeback was solidified with the 2008 single "60s 70s 80s" and its parent release Best Fiction. She continued to experiment musically in the 2010s, dabbling in EDM and recording in English, beginning with her tenth studio album Uncontrolled (2012). It featured the million-certified single "Love Story". She later founded her own management company, Stella88, and record label, Dimension Point.

Amuro finished her career with the 2017 greatest hits album Finally, which became the best selling album of the decade and made her the only artist to achieve a million-seller in each of their teens, 20s, 30s and 40s. She officially retired from the music industry on September 16, 2018. As it coincided with the closure of the Heisei era (1989–2019), she became labelled as the representative "Heisei diva" with many calling it the "end of an era", in both senses.

Having sold more than 40 million records, Amuro is recognized as one of the best-selling artists in Japan by Oricon. She has received accolades from the Japan Record Awards, Japan Gold Disc Awards, MTV Video Music Awards Japan and the World Music Awards.

== Life and career ==
=== 1977–1995: Early life and career beginnings ===
Namie Amuro was born on September 20, 1977, at Okinawa Red Cross Hospital in Naha, Okinawa. She is one of four children of Emiko Taira. Through her mother, Amuro is a quarter Italian. Having divorced when Amuro was only 4 years old, Taira raised her children solely in Okinawa – she worked as a nursery school employee and a bar hostess to support her family. Although Amuro had no ambition to become a singer, she was discovered at age 12, while visiting a friend. One year later, Amuro was scouted by Masayuki Makino, the owner of Okinawa Actors School, and eventually she was enrolled there. In 1991, Makino placed her in an idol group named Super Monkey's, with four other girls: Anna Makino, Hisako Arakaki, Minako Ameku and Nanako Takushi. The sixth member, Rino Nakasone, joined the group one year later. On September 16, 1992, Super Monkey's released their debut single, "Koi no Cute Beat/Mr USA". However, Anna Makino left the group at the end of that year. In 1993, the remaining members of Super Monkey's moved to Tokyo.

Super Monkey's did not gain much success and the group went through constant lineup changes. In 1994, the group changed their name to Namie Amuro with Super Monkey's to reflect Amuro's rising popularity as an upcoming actress and fashion model. Aside from group's musical activities, Amuro had bit parts in Japanese television series and small films. Super Monkey's experienced a large amount of success with their single "Try Me (Watashi o Shinjite)", produced by Italian eurobeat producer Dave Rodgers, and Japanese businessman Max Matsuura. Released on January 25, 1995, the song reached number eight on the Oricon Singles Chart, and stayed in the top 200 chart for 25 weeks. Despite the beginning success as a group, the other four members of the Super Monkey's formed their own sub-group, MAX, under the Japanese record label Avex Trax. As a result, Amuro released two more solo singles under Toshiba-EMI before moving to Avex Trax herself.

After signing with Avex Trax in 1995, the corresponding record company Avex Group enlisted Japanese musician Tetsuya Komuro to work with Amuro on her then-upcoming album. Amuro made her solo debut with Avex, releasing the single "Body Feels Exit" on October 25, 1995. It became a huge success in Japan, peaking at number three on the Oricon Singles Chart and sold over 882,000 units in Japan. Amuro's second single with Komuro, "Chase the Chance", became her first number-one single on the Oricon Singles Chart and her first single to sell over 1 million units in Japan. For Amuro's success with those singles, she won the Golden Arrow Award in 1995.

=== 1996–1998: Sweet 19 Blues, Concentration 20, pregnancy, marriage, breakthrough, 181920 and motherhood ===
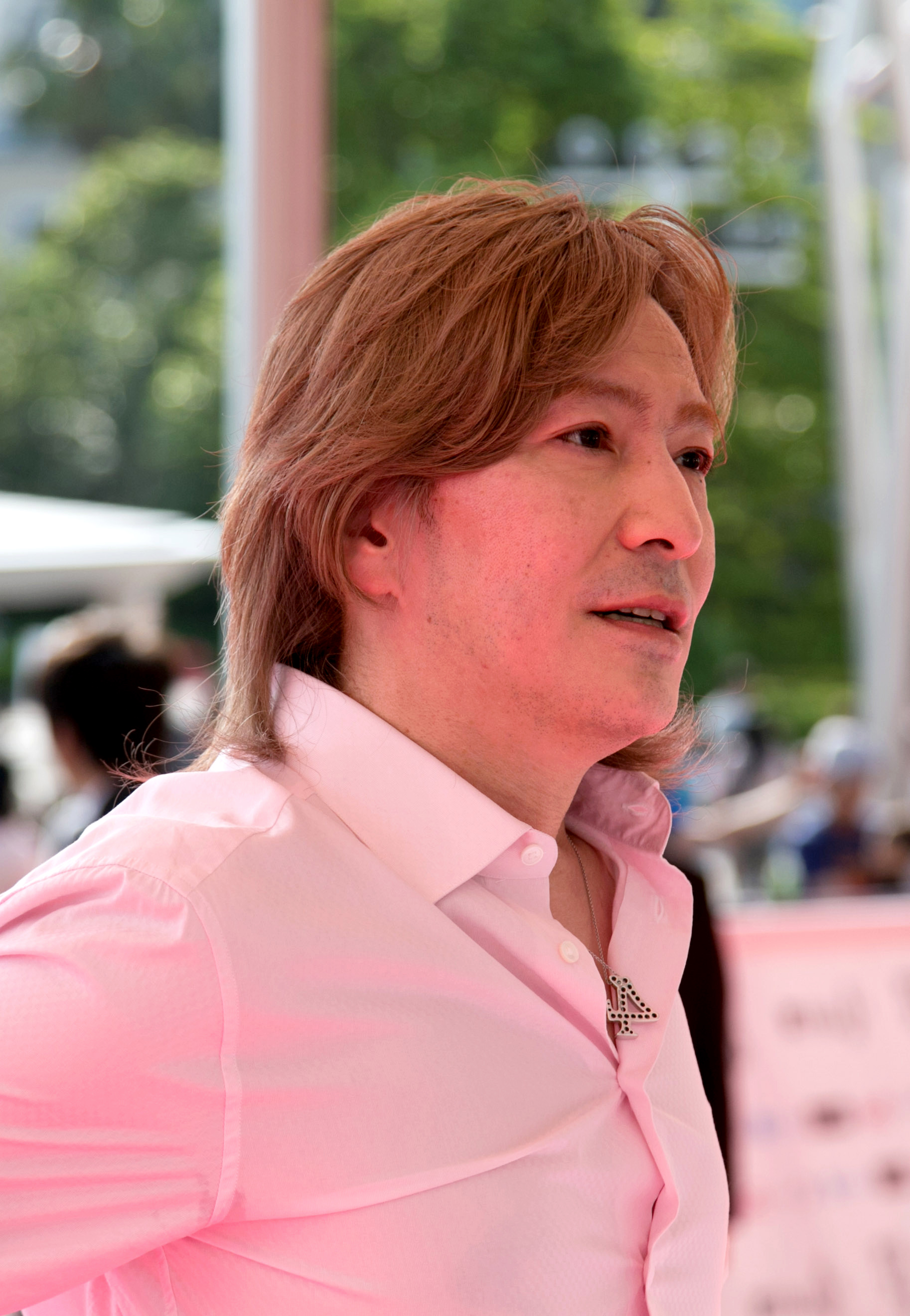
Japanese musician Tetsuya Komuro produced Amuro's first four studio albums.

After a brief hiatus, Amuro released two more singles in 1996: "Don't Wanna Cry" and "You're My Sunshine". Both singles were successful in Japan, bringing her second and third consecutive number one singles, and both sold over one million units there. Amuro achieved huge success after the release of her first solo studio album, Sweet 19 Blues (1996). Released on July 22, it reached number one on the Oricon Albums Chart in Japan, and has sold over 3.6 million units. She released the album's final single, the title track, on August 21, 1996; it achieved success by peaking at number two on the Oricon Singles Chart, and shifted over 400,000 units in Japan. On November 27, 1996, she started work on her second solo studio album with Komuro, and released its lead single "A Walk in the Park". It gave Amuro her fourth number one single on the Oricon Singles Chart, and her fourth single to sell over one million units there. At the end of 1996, she was awarded the Grand Prix Award for her song "Don't Wanna Cry", the highest honor at the Japan Record Awards, making her the youngest artist to have won the award. On February 19, 1997, she released her single "Can You Celebrate?", which became her fifth number one single. The single became a huge success in Japan, eventually selling 2,750,000 units there, making it the best-selling single by a solo female artist in Japan. After releasing her sixth consecutive number one single "How to Be a Girl" on May 21, 1997, Amuro released her second album Concentration 20 in July of that year. It became her third number one album in Japan, and sold over 1.9 million units there. For additional promotion, she embarked her Concentration 20 Dome Tour in Japan, which achieved commercial success. By early August 1997, the total sales of Amuro's records reached 20 million units in Japan.

During a press conference held on October 22, 1997, Amuro confirmed her marriage to Japanese musician and TRF band member Masaharu "Sam" Maruyama, and announced that she was three months pregnant with their first child. At the end of the year, she won the Grand Prix Award at the Japan Record Awards again for "Can You Celebrate?" and made her final appearance on the annual Japanese television music show 48th Kōhaku Uta Gassen before beginning her one-year hiatus from the music industry. She legally changed her name to Namie Maruyama, but continued to use her maiden name as her professional name.

Amuro's first compilation album, 181920, was released on January 28, 1998, and covers twelve singles which were released prior to her hiatus. The total sales of the album were around 2 million units in Japan. Four months later, on May 19, Amuro gave birth to her son, Haruto Maruyama at Maruyama Memorial General Hospital. She returned to the music industry by releasing the single "I Have Never Seen" on December 23, 1998. It became her eighth number one single on Oricon, and sold over 650,000 units in Japan. She made her first televised appearance on 49th Kōhaku Uta Gassen days later, performing a tearful rendition of her single "Can You Celebrate?".

=== 1999–2001: Personal struggles, Genius 2000 and Break the Rules ===
Working on the album Genius 2000 with Komuro and American producer Dallas Austin, after releasing its first single "I Have Never Seen" in 1998, Amuro released its second single "Respect the Power of Love" on March 17, 1999. On the same day, news publications in Amuro's hometown, Okinawa, reported that her mother, Emiko Taira, had been murdered. According to staff editors at The Japan Times, Emiko and her second husband, Tatsunobu Taira, were hit by an axe, owned by Kenji Taira, Emiko's ex-husband's brother. While her second husband survived with moderate injuries, Emiko was taken to hospital, and pronounced dead after noon on March 17. Kenji was then found dead in his car, after consuming insecticide. Upon hearing the news, Amuro postponed all promotional activities and flew back to Okinawa in order to identify her mother's body. A week later, the single debuted at the number two on the Oricon Singles Chart, beaten by the single "Dango 3 Kyodai". A third single, "Toi et Moi", was used for the Japanese animation movie Pokémon: The Movie 2000. Both singles proved successful, selling over 400,000 and 200,000 units in that region, respectively. Amuro made her first single debut with Austin on "Something 'Bout the Kiss", released on September 1, 1999. It became a success in Japan, reaching number three on the Oricon Singles Chart and sold over 390,000 units there. In January 2000, Amuro released her fourth studio album Genius 2000; it reached number one on the Oricon Albums Chart, and shifted over 800,000 units there. That same month, Amuro confirmed her separation from husband Masaharu. For the first half of 2000, Amuro embarked on her Genius 2000 Tour throughout Japan. She then released the single "Never End", in July, confirming work on her fifth studio album with Komuro and Austin. The single was used as part of the G8 Summit taking place in Okinawa, Japan that year. It was commissioned by late Prime Minister Keizō Obuchi, who asked Tetsuya Komuro to write a song conveying "a vision of harmony and interaction in the world in the 21st century". Obuchi later asked Amuro to perform the single at the summit.

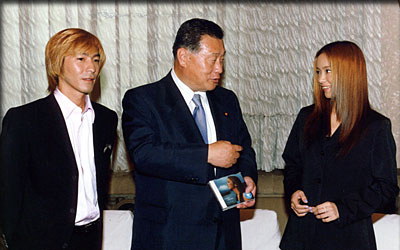
Komuro and Amuro presenting the CD single for "Never End" to Prime Minister Yoshiro Mori at the Prime Minister's Office on July 11, 2000

Amuro's fifth studio album Break the Rules was released on December 20, 2000, and is her final full-length produced album with Komuro. It became her first studio album to miss the top spot, peaking at number two on the Oricon Albums Chart. Amuro's sales started to decline from this release, as the album only shifted 335,000 units in Japan. To promote the studio album, Amuro toured Japan in March 2001, and finished in May that same year. In August, she released the single "Say the Word"; it was her first single that she contributed to songwriting. This was her first single to be released after departing with Komuro, until years later, and was released in part of her upcoming greatest hits album. Since then, she started to produce her own activities. However, in December she worked with Komuro for the last time on "Lovin' It", a single released as part of Avex's Song+Nation charity project. The single featured Japanese rapper Verbal from the music group M-Flo.

=== 2002–2004: Love Enhanced Single Collection, decline in sales and popularity, Suite Chic project and Style ===
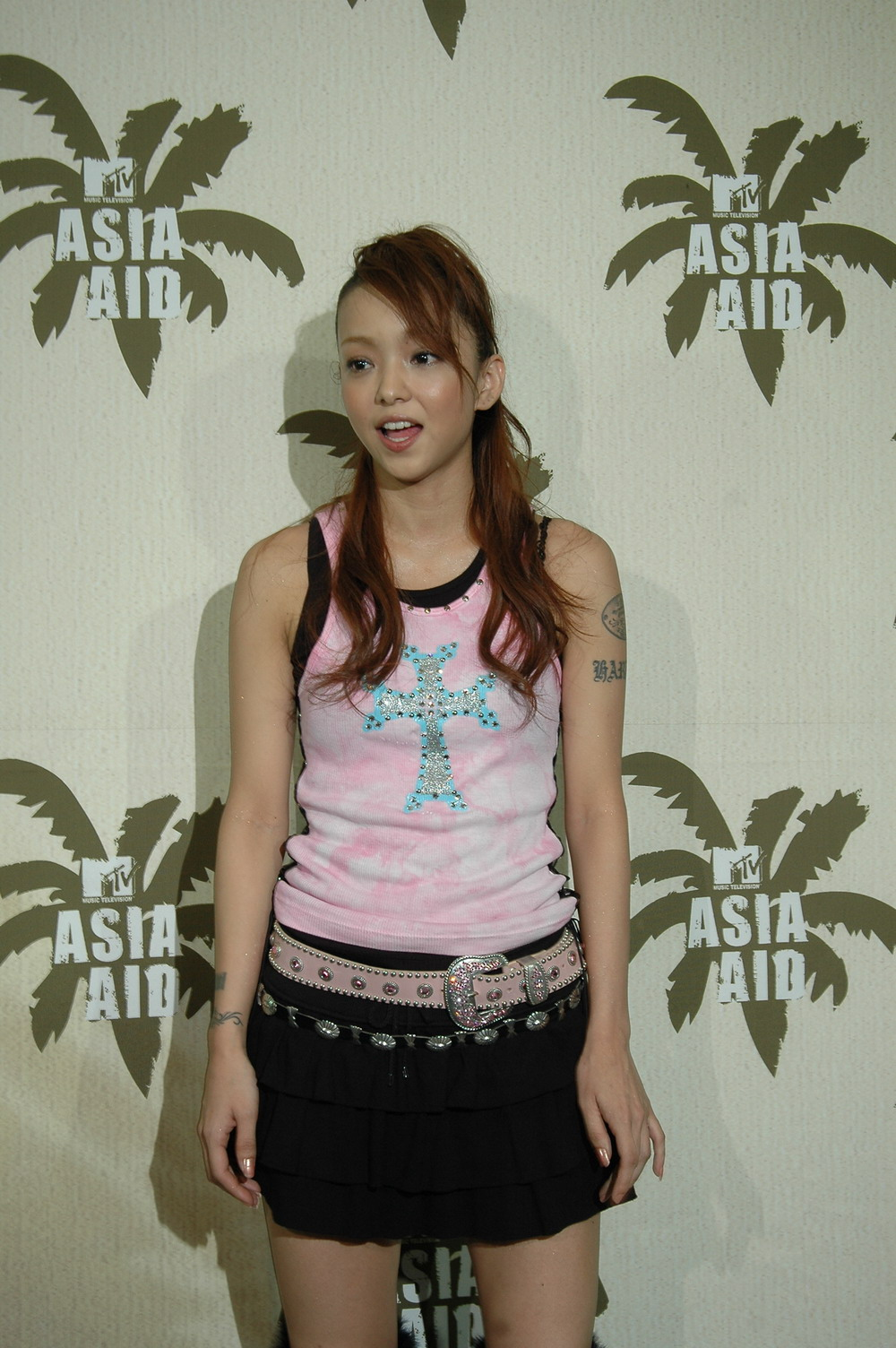
Amuro on the red carpet at MTV Asia Aid in Bangkok in February 2005

Amuro released her second compilation album, Love Enhanced Single Collection, on March 13, 2002. The album reworked nearly every single released after her return from hiatus in 1998, with new vocals, mixes or rearrangements. The single "I Will" was released a month before the album and became Amuro's first single below 100,000 units in sales. Although the album was moderately successful, peaking at number three and shifting over 300,000 units, it only sold a fraction of its predecessor 181920 (1998). In July 2002, Amuro divorced Maruyama, and legally changed her name back to Namie Amuro, having cited irreconcilable differences. According to reports, her divorce was due to her personal issues with Maruyama's family. Retrospectively, The Times attributed her loss in popularity during this era to the attention surrounding her personal struggles, while The Japan Times cited the rise of newer artists Hikaru Utada and Ayumi Hamasaki, who achieved great success in the wake of her hiatus. In a 2005 interview, Amuro said: "Even my closest friend said I was finished, but I think I may be a little different from the others. My popularity plunged three years ago and I didn’t try to court publicity. It was a real challenge forcing myself to be consistent in not playing up to my fans." Amuro started work on her sixth studio and third collaboration album with Dallas Austin, releasing Diane Warren-written single "Wishing on the Same Star" on September 11, 2002. The single saw a large slip in Amuro's sales, only shifting 95,000 units by the end of the year. In December 2002, Amuro was part of the musical project Suite Chic, involving several Japanese artists like Verbal, Zeebra, Dabo and DJ Muro. The project released two singles, one studio album and one remix album before dissolution in 2003.

Amuro returned to solo activities in mid-2003, releasing the singles "Shine More", "Put 'Em Up", and the double A-side singles: "So Crazy" and "Come". The single's saw an exploration of westernised musical styles with American producers, including R&B producers Full Force and the work of Austin. "Come" was used for the Japanese anime InuYasha, and is a re-arranged song that was originally recorded by Australian recording artist and TV personality Sophie Monk. At the end of the year, she released her sixth studio album and first album in three years, Style. The album became her lowest chart album on the Oricon Albums Chart, peaking at number four. It is also her lowest selling studio album, shifting only 222,000 units in that region. To promote the studio album, Amuro embarked on the So Crazy Tour on November 29. The tour concluded in Japan on April 11, 2004. She extended the concert tour, marked as a promotional appearance, in Taiwan, and South Korea. Shortly after the tour, she released the single "All for You" on July 22, 2004, confirming work on her seventh studio album. This was followed by the double A-side single "Girl Talk" and "Girl Talk/The Speed Star", released on October 14, 2004. It was successful in Japan, peaking at number two, and sold over 107,000 units in that region; it became her first top three single in two years. Amuro decided not to appear on 55th Kōhaku Uta Gassen, although she had been invited to perform at the event. She had previously attended the event nine years in a row.

=== 2005–2006: Queen of Hip-Pop and expansion into Asia ===
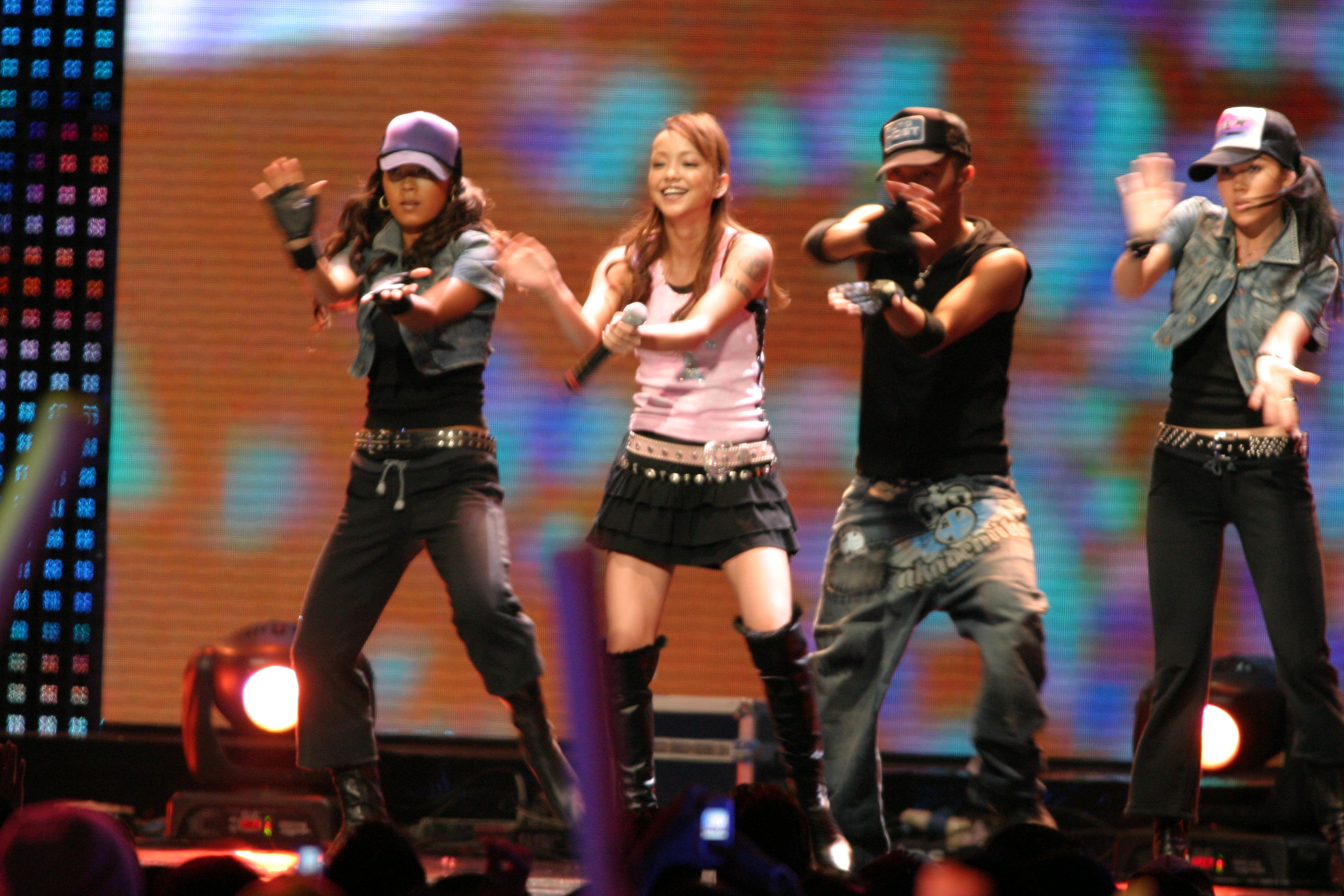
Amuro performing "Girl Talk" at MTV Asia Aid in Bangkok in February 2005

In April 2005, Amuro released the single "Want Me, Want Me". The song was a success in Japan, reaching number two on Oricon Singles Chart, and sold over 103,000 units in that region. In May, following a three-year split from Maruyama, Japanese publications reported that she would take back full custody of their child, Haruto. In August, she was granted full custody of Haruto with visitation rights by Maruyama. On May 29, Amuro performed at MTV Video Music Awards Japan for the fourth consecutive year in a row. She won two awards, "Best R&B Video" and "Most Impressive Performing Asian Artist", making her the first artist to win MTV VMAJ awards four years in a row (she won "Inspiration Award" in 2002, "Best Collaboration" in 2003 and "Best R&B Video" in 2004). Amuro released her seventh studio album Queen of Hip-Pop in July 2005. The album includes four singles: "Alarm", "All For You", "Girl Talk/The Speed Star" and "Want Me, Want Me". Queen of Hip-Pop was a success, reaching number two on the Oricon Albums Chart, and sold over 455,000 units in Japan. In collaboration with MGM Studios, Amuro was granted permission to use Pink Panther in the album. A female panther counterpart was created for the album as well. Both panther characters appeared in the music video of "WoWa". In September 2005, Amuro embarked on her Space of Hip-Hop concert tour in Japan. Shortly after the commencement of the tour, she announced that she would contribute to the Japanese theatrical release of the film Sin City (2005). After viewing the movie, Amuro made an offer to the Japanese distribution company to sing its theme song; the company, feeling that her image fit the movie, accepted her offer. The theme song, "Violet Sauce", was later released as part of a double A-side single, "White Light/Violet Sauce", in November 2005. It achieved moderate success in Japan, reaching number seven on the Oricon Singles Chart, and sold over 72,000 units there. The movie's director, Robert Rodriguez, was impressed by the song and asked to be a part of it; he can be heard saying "Welcome to Sin City" towards the end of the song. Shortly after the single, she released Filmography 2001–2005, a compilation of twelve of her music videos between the years 2001 to 2005. Amuro collaborated with Japanese recording artists Zeebra, Ai, and Mummy-D on Zeebra's album, The New Beginning, released in February 2006, in a song called "Do What U Gotta Do". In May, she released the double A-side single "Can't Sleep, Can't Eat, I'm Sick/Ningyo", which peaked at number two on the Oricon Singles Chart and shifted over 80,000 units in Japan. In August 2006, Amuro conducted her Live Style 2006 tour, spanning between August and November 2006. Released in February 2007, the Live DVD of the tour was placed on the second position by Oricon. Its total sales exceeded 90,000 units in Japan.

=== 2007–2009: Resurgence of sales, revived popularity, Play, Best Fiction and Past<Future ===
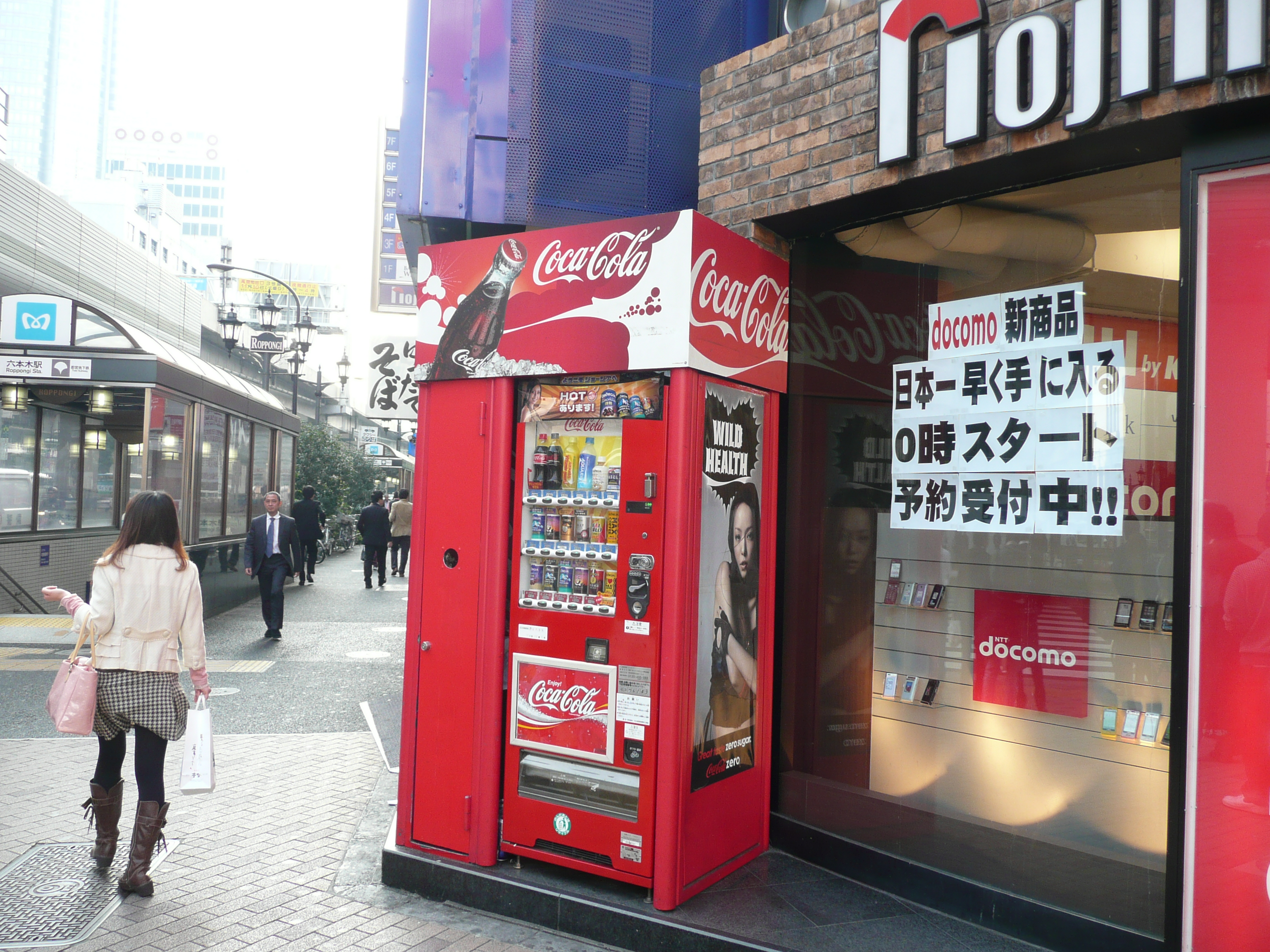
Amuro's image promoting her single Wild on the side of a Coca-Cola vending machine in November 2009

Amuro released the third single from her upcoming eight studio album, "Baby Don't Cry" on January 24, 2007; it was used as the theme song for the Japanese television series Himitsu no Hanazono. It was successful in Japan, reaching number three on the Oricon Singles Chart, and sold over 144,000 units in that region, her highest selling single since "Say the Word". Based on ringtone sales, it became her first single to shift over one million units since "How to Be a Girl". Alongside this, she achieved the distinction in having a top ten single each year for 13 consecutive years, breaking the solo female artist's record in Japan by Kyōko Koizumi and Shizuka Kudō. At the end of 2007, it ranked at number seven on the RIAJ yearly ringtone sales charts. She then released the fourth and final single, "Funky Town", on April 4, 2007. It achieved moderate success on the Oricon Singles Chart, peaking at number seven, and shifted over 54,000 units. She was also featured on Japanese group, M-Flo's album, Cosmicolor, in a song titled "Luvotomy". Her eighth studio album, Play, was released on June 27, 2007. The album charted atop of the Oricon Albums Chart, becoming Amuro's first number-one album in more than 7 years. To promote the album, Amuro conducted her concert tour in Japan, titled Play Tour 2007, spanning between August 18, 2007, and February 27, 2008. Originally consisting of 53 performances, it increased by 12 performances to 65 performances, making this Amuro's longest spanning tour. On the day when Play Tour 2007 concluded, Amuro released the Live DVD of the tour. It was placed on the second position by Oricon.

In early 2008, Amuro confirmed that she would promote Japanese hair company Vidal Sassoon through their new marketing campaign Fashion x Music x VS, with a new single. The single, though marketed as an extended play, was titled 60s 70s 80s, and consisted of three songs: "New Look", "Rock Steady", and "What A Feeling". The songs feature samples from The Supremes's "Baby Love" (1964), Aretha Franklin's "Rock Steady" (1971) and Irene Cara's "What A Feeling" (1983), respectively. 60s 70s 80s became a huge success in Japan, reaching number one on the Oricon Singles Chart, and sold over 293,000 units in that region, becoming Amuro's first number-one single since "I Have Never Seen" and her highest selling single since "Baby Don't Cry". On March 25, 2008, Amuro was awarded "Best Female Video" for "Hide & Seek" (from the album Play) at Space Shower Music Video Awards. "Hide & Seek" also won the award for "Best R&B Video" at MTV Video Music Awards, which was held at the Saitama Super Arena on May 31. In the same month, Amuro recorded a collaboration with Japanese musician Double in a song called "Black Diamond". Despite lacklustre success on the Oricon Singles Chart, it sold over 500,000 ringtone units. On July 26, Amuro participated at the 2008 A-nation music concert; an estimated 25,000 people attended her performance. This was the first time she was invited to perform in seven years. On July 30, she released her third greatest hits album, Best Fiction. Featuring tracks between 2003 and 2008, Best Fiction sold 681,000 copies in the first week and debuted at number one on the Oricon Albums Chart. Within its third week, Best Fiction sold over one million units, making her the first artist to have one million certified album in three consecutive decades. Best Fiction eventually spent six consecutive weeks at the number-one position, becoming the first album to do so in more than 14 years since the Dreams Come True's 1993 album Magic. By the end of 2008, Best Fiction became the second best-selling album behind Exile's Exile Love. In addition, it became the second best selling digital-format album by a Japanese artist behind Hikaru Utada's Heart Station. Best Fiction was awarded the Album of the Year award at the 50th Japan Record Awards. To promote the album, Amuro conducted her Best Fiction Tour, spanning between October 25, 2008, and July 12, 2009. The Live DVD and Blu-ray of the tour were released on September 9, 2009. Amuro was invited again to the 59th NHK Kōhaku Uta Gassen, but she declined.

On January 20, 2009, Amuro begun working on her ninth studio album, and featured a new track entitled "Dr." through a Vidal Sassoon commercial. She then released the album's lead double A-side singles, "Wild/Dr.," on March 18, 2009. The song was a success, peaking at number one on the Oricon Singles Chart, and sold over 119,000 units in that region. As a result, she also broke her own record of having all of her singles debut in the top 10 (on the Oricon Daily Singles Chart) for the last 15 years. Amuro collaborated with Japanese music group Ravex on a song for their album Trax (2008), entitled "Rock U". On October 1, Vidal Sassoon released new commercials featuring Amuro, and two tracks from her ninth studio album, "My Love" and "Copy That". On December 16, 2009, Amuro released her ninth studio album, Past<Future. The album was a success on the Oricon Albums Chart, reaching number one, and sold over 600,000 units in that region, slightly higher than the sales of Play.

=== 2010–2012: Award at WMA 2010, Checkmate!, Uncontrolled and 20th anniversary commemoration ===
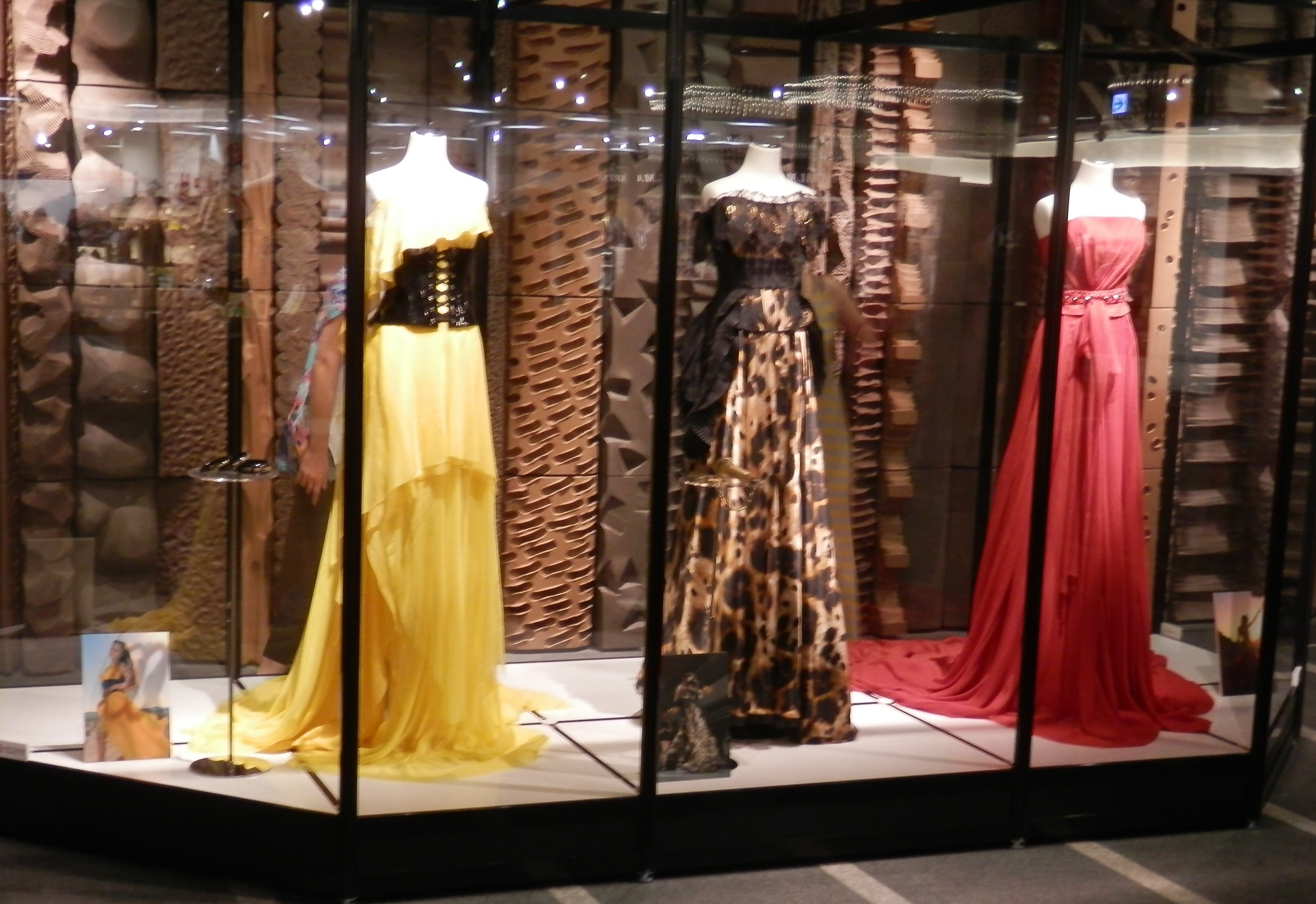
A selection of Amuro's costumes she wore during the entire Uncontrolled era; these selections are taken from the music videos Hot Girls and Only You.

To promote Past<Future, Amuro travelled throughout 26 cities in Japan to conduct her Past<Future Tour 2010, which began on April 3, 2010, in Ichihara, Chiba and concluded on December 15, 2010, in Nagoya, Aichi. On the day when Past<Future Tour 2010 ended, Amuro released the Live DVD and Blu-ray of the tour, which reached the top spot on the Oricon DVD charts and shifted over 100,000 copies. On May 18, 2010, Amuro won the Best Asian Artist award at World Music Awards in Monte Carlo, Monaco. There, she performed her track "Hide & Seek" from her album Play. Two months later, she released her double A-side single "Break It/Get Myself Back", which performed well on several record charts in Japan. On December 15, 2010, together with the premiere of Live DVD and Blu-ray of Past<Future Tour 2010, the Blu-rays of Space of Hip-Pop, BEST Tour Live Style 2006 and PLAY Tour 2007 were also released.

On April 27, 2011, Amuro published her fifth compilation and second collaboration album Checkmate!, her first musical release of the year. The album featured nine collaborative tracks Amuro had participated in throughout her career and four new recordings: "Wonder Woman", "Make It Happen", "Unusual" and "#1". Checkmate! was a commercial success, reaching the top spot on Oricon and distributed over 500,000 units in Japan. On July 27, Amuro released her first triple A-side single, "Naked/Fight Together/Tempest". Although it reached number two on Oricon Singles Chart, "Fight Together" was used as the theme song of the anime series One Piece. "Naked/Fight Together/Tempest" achieved better sales through digital store and certified double platinum by RIAJ. At the end of July 2011, Amuro conducted her first arena tour Live Style 2011 to promote Checkmate! and some new materials taken from her then-upcoming studio record. "Sit! Stay! Wait! Down!/Love Story" was the next double A-side single from Amuro's upcoming studio album, released on December 7, 2011. While the physical release of the single exceeded 100,000 units in Japan, "Love Story" shifted over 3 million digital copies throughout Japan, becoming one of Amuro's highest-selling singles to date. The single also featured two unreleased tracks: "Higher" and "Arigatou". "Higher" made an appearance on her Live Style 2011, whereas "Arigatou" was made available as a free download on Amuro's official Facebook page. The Live DVD and Blu-ray of the tour were released on December 21, 2011.

The final single, "Go Round/Yeah-Oh!", was released on March 21, 2012, and continued the 100,000 sales streak in Japan. In April, the singer confirmed the release of her 10th studio and first bilingual album Uncontrolled, which premiered on June 27, 2012. The album proved to be commercially successful, reaching the top spot on the Oricon Albums Chart and shifted 500,000 units throughout Japan. Uncontrolled also gave her the highest first-week sales of the year, and her 10th overall number one in the region. On September 16, Amuro was scheduled to host a special concert tour in her hometown Okinawa, commemorating her 20th anniversary in the music business. However, due to typhoon warnings in the region, the tour was cancelled and never rescheduled. After debuting her first digital single "Damage" on October 31, Amuro finished the year by conducting her 5 Major Domes Tour 2012 in Japan, spanning between November 24 and December 21, 2012, attended by around 340,000 people. Released on February 27, 2013, the Live DVD and Blu-ray of the tour were placed on the first position by Oricon. Their total sales exceeded 300,000 units in Japan.

=== 2013–2015: Feel, Ballada and Genic ===
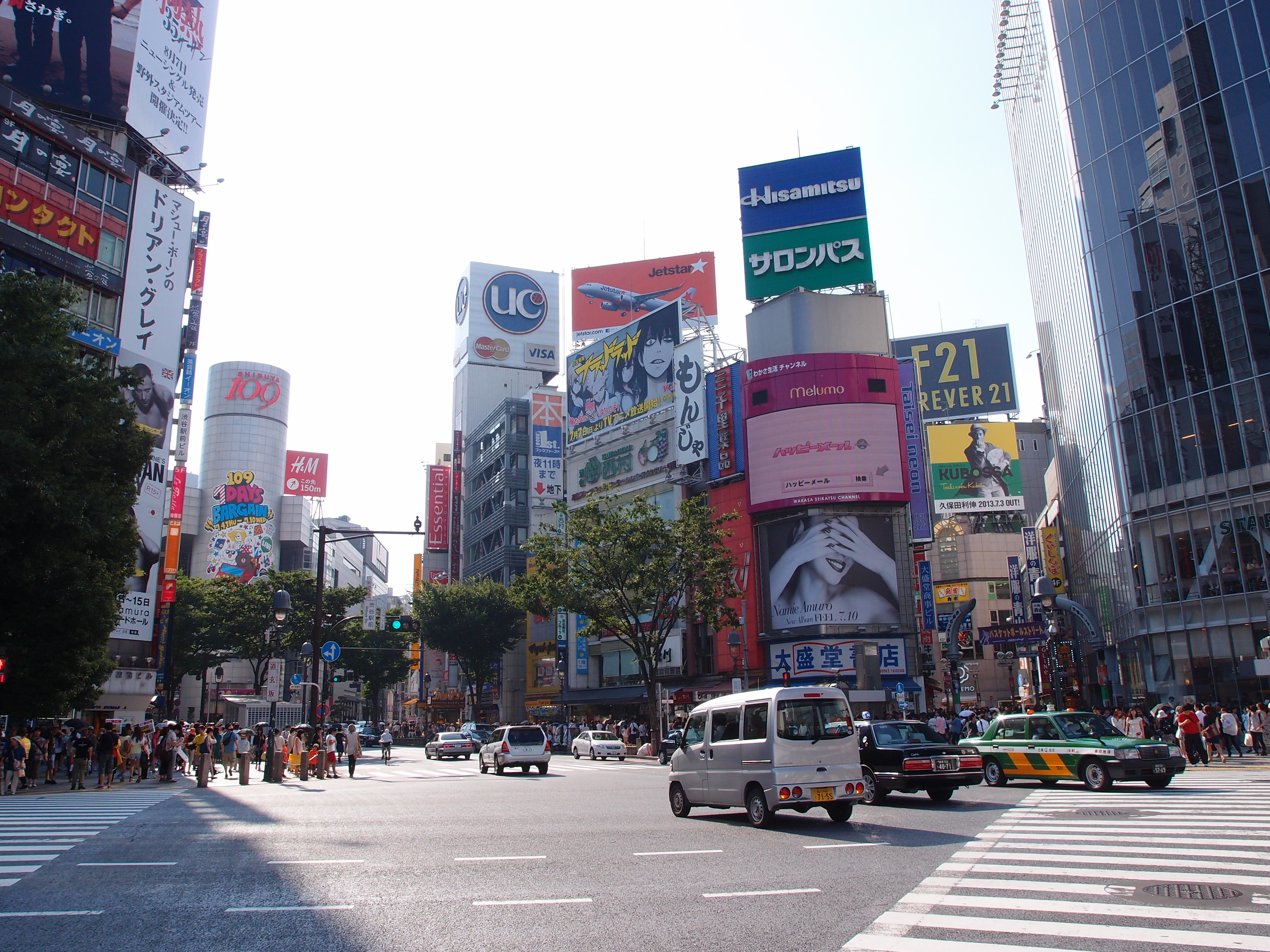
Amuro's picture promoted her album Feel on a billboard in Shibuya in July 2013.

On March 6, 2013, Amuro released her double A-side single "Big Boys Cry/Beautiful". Although both tracks appeared in the commercials for the make-up brand Kosé, its commercial experience resulted in being the singer's worst-performing single to date, barely shifting 30,000 units in Japan. Amuro returned to sole-digital releases with her single "Contrail", which was used as the theme song for the Tokyo Broadcasting System (TBS) series Flying Public Relations Office, and sold over 250,000 digital copies in Japan. Additionally, two more songs were released on the iTunes Store to promote her then-upcoming album: "Hands on Me" and "Heaven". On July 10, 2013, Amuro released her 11th studio and second bilingual album Feel. This was her first studio release through her own record label Dimension Point, which was operated under Avex Trax. Despite offering the track "Beautiful" as a single, it did not appeal on the final track list of the album. It was commercially successful on the Oricon Albums Chart, debuting at the top spot and was certified platinum by RIAJ. In support of the album, Amuro conducted her FEEL Tour 2013, spanning between August 16 and December 23, 2013. The Live DVD and Blu-ray of the tour were released on February 26, 2014. During the course of Amuro's digital releases, she was offered to feature in the remake of "Waterfalls", a song originally recorded by American girl-group TLC. Amuro—who knew the group during the singer's sessions with producer Dallas Austin, and whose fellow Okinawa Actors School alumni Speed had been huge fans of TLC—accepted the role, and re-recorded the rap segment as a homage to previous member Lisa 'Left Eye' Lopes, who had died in a car accident in La Ceiba, Honduras in 2002. Despite being a Japan-only release, Amuro's version was criticized due to the announcement of her involvement without the knowledge of Lopes' family, though Lopes' sister later stated she had no objections to Amuro's inclusion. However, TLC defended Amuro's involvement as neither member had access to Lopes' master recording rights and they "were forced to use creative ways to honor Lisa's memory and celebrate this milestone with the fans".

In 2014, Amuro released her single "Tsuki", including the title track and two previous digital compositions – "Ballerina" and "Neonlight Lipstick". The physical single was successful in sales, while the title song achieved a platinum award by the RIAJ. On June 4, 2014, Amuro released Ballada, her first conceptual greatest hits compilation. 15 tracks were all selected via a fan poll on the singer's website, and a few selection were re-recorded with new vocals and arrangements by Amuro. Additionally, a bonus DVD package included new music videos for her 1990's singles "Sweet 19 Blues" and "Can You Celebrate?", and two newly established videos for "Himawari" and "Four Seasons". It was placed on the first position by Oricon, and shifted under 500,000 units in Japan. In support of the album, Amuro conducted her second nationwide tour Live Style 2014, spanning between August 22 and December 23, 2014. The Live DVD and Blu-ray of the tour were released on February 11, 2015, through her label Dimension Point. In November 2014, Amuro released her first stand-alone single titled "Brighter Day", which featured a total of three different tracks and instrumentals. It was moderately successful on the Oricon Singles Chart, whereas the titular track sold over 250,000 digital copies in Japan. That same month, Amuro collaborated with Taiwanese singer Jolin Tsai on a song titled "I'm Not Yours", which was released as a track on Tsai's album Play (2014). The music video of the song was published on YouTube on February 2, 2015.

On June 10, 2015, Amuro released her 12th studio and third bilingual album Genic. It marked her first record with her own management company Stella88, which she founded after leaving Vision Factory. Despite there being five music videos from the record, the entire collection of tracks were newly recorded and featured no singles. However, it was a commercial success, peaking atop of Oricon Albums Chart and sold 250,000 copies in Japan alone. In collaboration with Google, the music video of "Anything", one of the songs from Genic, was produced as an extension of Google Chrome. To promote the album, Amuro conducted her Livegenic 2015–2016 tour, spanning between September 5, 2015, and February 10, 2016. During the course of her December concert dates, Amuro released her second independent maxi-single "Red Carpet" on December 2, 2015. The B-side track of the single, "Black Make Up", was used as the ending soundtrack of the anime series One Piece. Despite reaching number two on Oricon Singles Chart, the sales of "Red Carpet" slumped and only shifted 36,000 units in Japan, making it one of Amuro's lowest-selling singles to date. The Live DVD and Blu-ray of LIVEGENIC 2015–2016 were released on March 2, 2016.

=== 2016–2018: Return of maxi-single releases, 25th anniversary commemoration, Finally and retirement ===
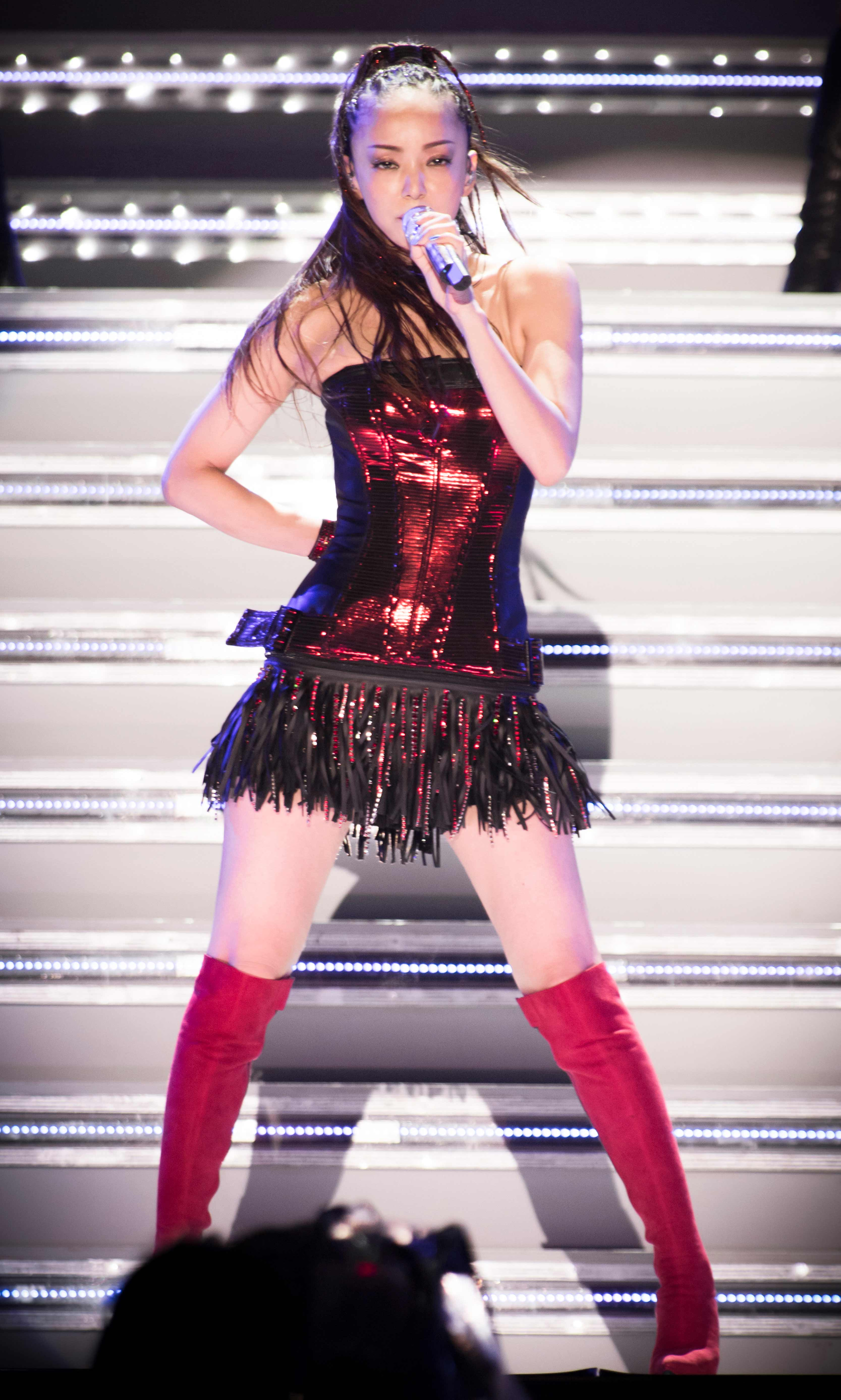
Amuro at her 25th anniversary concert in Okinawa in September 2017

On May 18, 2016, Amuro released her third independent maxi-single "Mint", which was used as the theme song of Fuji TV series Bokuno Yabai Tsuma (2016). Despite reaching number four on the region's single chart, the digital sales skyrocketed with the music video of the song, and achieved platinum status months later. The same year in June, Amuro accepted an offer by NHK to record the theme song for the Japanese broadcast of 2016 Summer Olympics and Paralympics in Rio de Janeiro. The single was titled "Hero" and saw a rise in its physical sales, achieving a gold certification by RIAJ. On October 26, 2016, Amuro released two songs "Dear Diary" and "Fighter" as a double A-side single "Dear Diary/Fighter". Both songs were used in Death Note: Light Up the New World, a 2016 movie adaption of the manga of the same name.

Amuro conducted her fourth annual tour Live Style 2016–2017, spanning between August 19, 2016, and May 3, 2017. The tour initially scheduled 88 dates, but due to a higher demand and further promotional activities with singles and the unreleased track "Christmas Wish", Amuro added 13 dates. The Live DVD and Blu-ray of the tour were released on May 3, 2017, and certified gold by RIAJ. On May 31, 2017, Amuro released her single "Just You and I", which sold over 100,000 digital units according to RIAJ. The following month, Amuro announced her 25th anniversary concert in her hometown Okinawa, which redeemed her cancelled 20th anniversary concert on September 16, 2012, due to typhoon warnings in the region. She opened the show on September 16 and 17, with 52,000 attenders totally (26,000 attenders each day), resulting in being one of the largest for a Japanese concert. Additionally, Amuro announced her third-time collaboration with One Piece. The anime's theme song, "Hope", premiered on October 1, 2017.

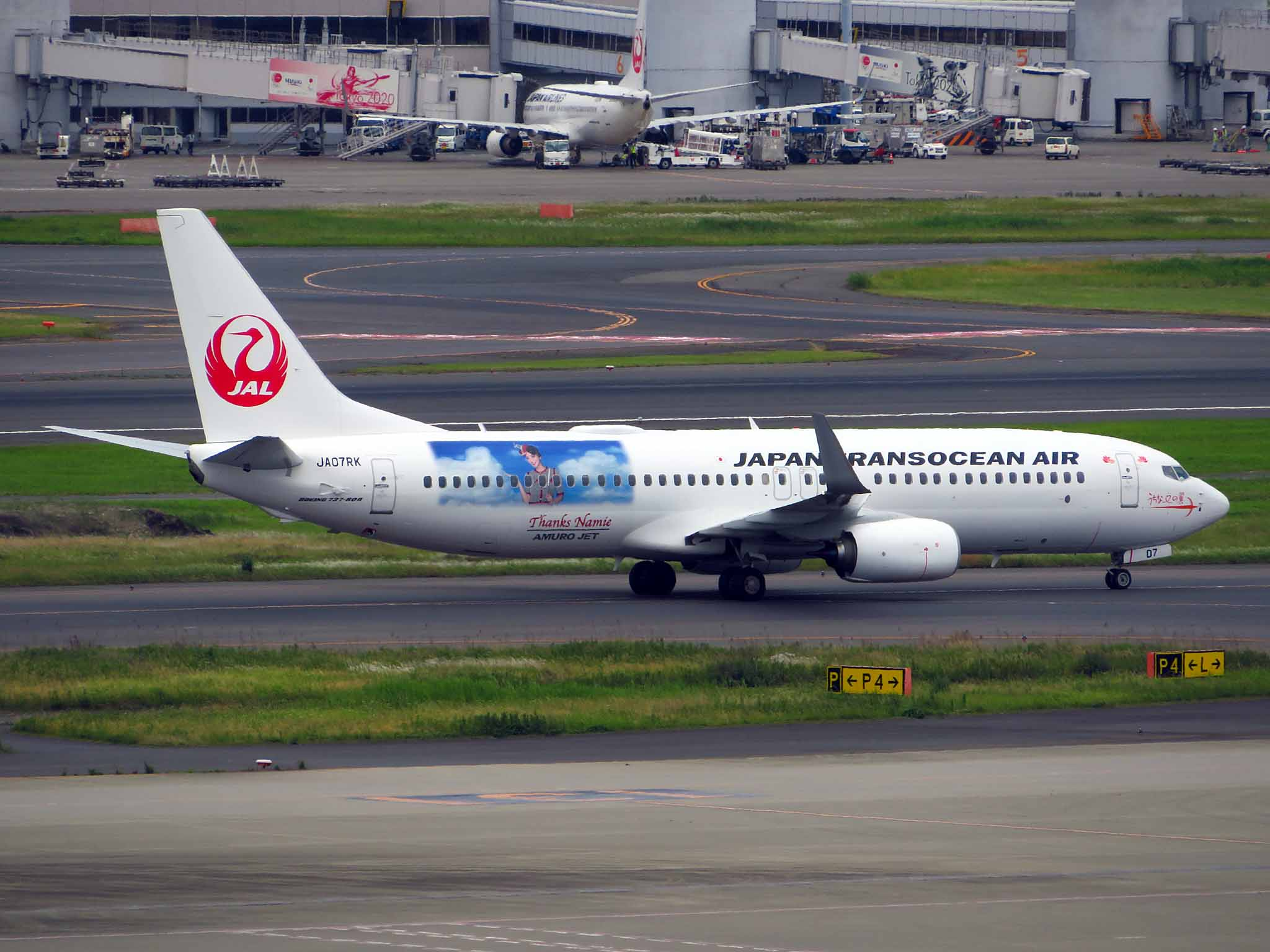
Namie Amuro 25th Anniversary in Okinawa livery appeared on Japan Transocean Air's Boeing 737 from May to September 2018 to commemorate her retirement.

On September 20, 2017, Amuro's 40th birthday, she announced her plan to retire from the music industry on September 16, 2018. Her final compilation album, Finally, was released on November 8, 2017. The album includes new recordings and re-recordings of her selected singles from 1992 to 2017. Finally became a huge success in Japan – it was placed on the first position by Oricon and sold 2,250,000 units by the end of 2017. In support of the album, Amuro conducted the Final Tour 2018 ~Finally~ as her farewell tour, spanning between February 17 and June 3, 2018. The tour took place in Nagoya Dome, Fukuoka Dome, Sapporo Dome, Osaka Dome and Tokyo Dome. During this tour, Amuro conducted another tour, named Final Tour 2018 ~Finally~ In Asia, to perform in China, Hong Kong and Taiwan. Taking place in Shenzhen Bay Sports Center, Hong Kong Coliseum and Taipei Arena, Final Tour 2018 ~Finally~ In Asia began on March 17 and concluded on May 20, 2018.

On May 23, 2018, Amuro was awarded "Okinawa's National Honor Award" at Okinawa Prefecture Government Office in Naha. By August 21, the total number of pre-ordered Live DVD and Blu-ray of Final Tour 2018 (the concerts in Japan only) exceeded 1 million units in Japan. On August 25, One Piece featured the anime version of Amuro at the end of one of its episodes to bid a farewell to her. The Live DVD and Blu-ray of Final Tour 2018 (the concerts in Japan only) were released on August 29, 2018. On September 15, Amuro made her final appearance as an entertainer at the "We ♥ Namie Hanabi Show: I ♥ Okinawa / I ♥ Music" at the Okinawa Convention Center, a commemoration of Amuro's career and other cultural and musical aspects in Okinawa. She officially retired from the entertainment industry on September 16, 2018. On September 30, 2018, her official website, fanclub, Facebook page, and online store all terminated service. On June 16, 2019, Amuro released her entire music collection onto the iTunes store (most of which was previously restricted to Japan), through her label Dimension Point. Her records published by her own label were also released through Apple Music, Apple's streaming service, on the same day. In November 2023, 5 years after her continued silence after her retirement, Amuro's creative content including her full discography on streaming services, music videos, online stores, and her YouTube channel were removed from official internet sites. As of 2026, her music releases are still absent from streaming services.

== Artistry ==
"Can You Celebrate?" (1997)
Amuro's best-selling single, Can You Celebrate?, represented a J-pop style that she experimented with during the 1990s.

"Fight Together" (2011)
Near the end of her career, Amuro transitioned into electronic dance music, as heard through her dance-pop track "Fight Together".

Amuro has a mezzo-soprano vocal range. By 2000, the English language started to heavily mix in with her music, starting with Genius 2000. In several tracks, Amuro would record her vocals in Japanese (and additionally in English), whereas back-up vocalists would provide English translations and marry the two together. By Play, the singer would start to record tracks with less electronic synths and beats, particularly with the album track "Baby Don't Cry". According to Mills, he felt that the song focused more on her vocals than the production. Her final three studio albums, Uncontrolled, Feel and Genic, had multiple full-length English tracks and, although it received positive remarks for experimentation, she was frequently lambasted for her incomprehensible deliveries in most songs.

Throughout her career, Amuro has covered a wide range of musical styles and genres. Her music through the 1990s were influenced by eurobeat and the rise of J-pop music. Additionally, she identifies Madonna and Janet Jackson as her inspirations, despite constant comparisons with sound and imagery by critics and publications alike. Sweet 19 Blues stuck with J-pop elements, but she began to experiment with Western genres such as R&B, jungle, acid house, house and jazz. From Genius 2000, she worked with American producer Dallas Austin, resulting in a fully adapted hip hop record with elements of J-pop. She carried this sound on with Style (2003), another record produced by Austin, and eventually onto Queen of Hip-Pop (2005). Amuro's transition from J-pop to "more mature, transatlantic" R&B was noted by critics, and the aforementioned title "Queen of Hip-Pop" was used by the Japanese media to identify her (the term "Hip-Pop" is Amuro's combination of hip-hop and pop).

In 2007, Amuro released Play, which was highlighted as one of her key re-inventions of her entire career. Sonically, the record relied on R&B and hip hop elements, but started to involve contemporary dance-pop music. To an extent, Tills from AllMusic compared the effort to the works of Jennifer Lopez and En Vogue. Uncontrolled (2012) saw yet another transition with her sound, leaving R&B and focusing on electronic dance music. Additionally, this saw her first experimentation with full-length English language tracks. Unlike her previous records, Uncontrolled ventured into Western practitioners to helm the collection, including the likes of The Nervo Twins, Henrik Nordenback, Christian Fast and Peter Mansson. This trend also moved onto her follow-up album Feel, where she worked with artists such as Hook n Sling, Dsign Music and Zedd. Her final studio album, Genic (2015), was her first record not handled by Japanese producers, and her second record to include almost all tracks entirely in English (after her 2013 album Feel).

== Legacy ==
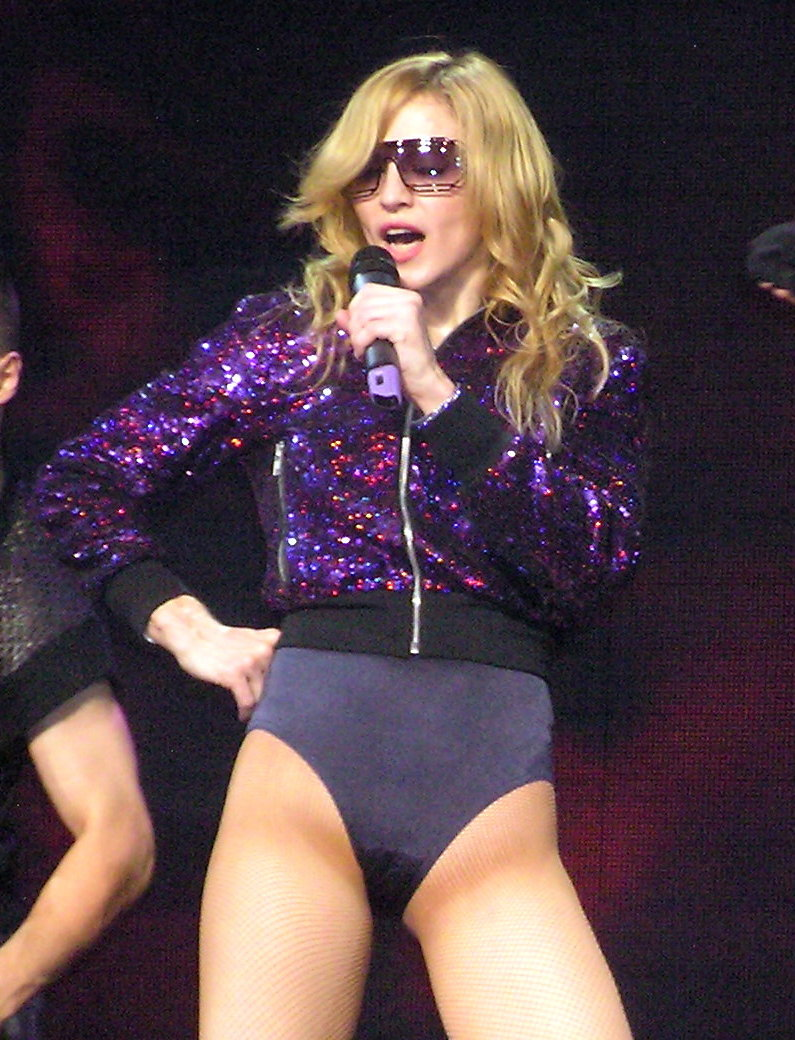
Amuro's sudden rise to fame was compared to American artist Madonna, hence she has been called "Japanese Madonna".

Ever since her debut, Amuro has been classified as one of Japan's most prominent and successful singers. In an opined article published by The Japan Times, writer Ian Martin encompassed the singer alongside superlatives Yumi Matsutoya, Hikaru Utada, Seiko Matsuda and Hibari Misora as the leading female figures in Japanese music history. Although Martin identified Utada as one of the "only contemporaries" to break the Western society, he felt Amuro was her "most immediate predecessor," based solely on the fact that "[Amuro] represented a period when Japanese pop was learning to see itself as something that could stand alongside the Western music from which it took many cues." Additionally, Amuro's career has been constantly compared to the likes of Matsuda's, both whom grew up in the idol routine and having achieved commercial resilience ever since; music author Motti Regev regarded the musicians as part of the "golden age of J-Pop", before records declined due to the rise of the digital market in the mid-2000s. Because of her longevity and the numerous musical and imagery re-inventions, numerous publications have referred her as the "Queen of Japanese Pop" and the Japanese equivalent to American singers Janet Jackson and Madonna.

Throughout her years active as a singer, Amuro has sold more than 36 million records in Japan according to Oricon. According to a report by Entertainment Weekly announcing her retirement, she has sold more albums in Japan than Lady Gaga, Katy Perry or Kesha have in the United States combined. As of 2017, this makes her the fifth highest-selling female act, and fourth best-selling female solo act overall, just behind Yumi Matsutoya, Ayumi Hamasaki, Hikaru Utada, and Japanese all-girl idol group AKB48 (see total list here). Additionally, Amuro was ranked the 12th best-selling digital artist according to Japanese digital site Recochoku. The singer has achieved nine number-one studio albums with an additional five compilation/collaborative inclusions, and 10 number-one singles. She is one of the only female solo artists to achieve the most accumulations of million-certified physical singles, with a total of five ("Chase the Chance", "Don't Wanna Cry", "You're My Sunshine", "A Walk in the Park" and "Can You Celebrate?" – see her discography for more). "Can You Celebrate?" still remains the best-selling physical release by a female singer—with estimate sales of 2.750 million copies sold in Japan alone. For a brief period in 1996, her second studio album Sweet 19 Blues was the best-selling album in Japanese music history. Additionally, she held the record for the highest-opening sales for a female or solo artist until it was challenged by Hikaru Utada's 1999 studio album First Love, which to this day stands as the best-selling album in Japan.

With her sudden rise to stardom, Amuro was noted by journalists and commentators as a trendsetter to the Japan and across Asia. She eventually became the most prominent figure in fashion magazines and the general press for changing the typical Japanese idol image and styles of women in Japan, in favour of "dyeing their hair brown, plucking their eyebrows... thick-soled/long boots, a miniskirt, tanned-skin and tattoos". This made her a fashion icon, and created a phenomenon fan base known as Amuraa in the 1990s, with many young girls and women looked up to her fashion, hairstyle and makeup. Additionally, her style has been noted for paving the way for kogal fashion trends in Japan, as well as for the gyaru subculture. Anthropologist Hiroshi Aoyagi said in 2003 that Amuro changed the stereotypical idol culture. Writer Marwan Kraidy described Amuro in 2005 as part of "Japan's rising cultural power" towards the world. Nichi-Bei Josei Jānaru, writing for the U.S.-Japan Women's Journal, believed the success of Sweet 19 Blues was the reason many people emulated her as a role model between 1996 and 1997.

== Discography ==
- Dance Tracks Vol. 1 (1995)
- Sweet 19 Blues (1996)
- Concentration 20 (1997)
- Genius 2000 (2000)
- Break The Rules (2000)
- Style (2003)
- Queen of Hip-Pop (2005)
- Play (2007)
- Past<Future (2009)
- Uncontrolled (2012)
- Feel (2013)
- Genic (2015)

== Filmography ==
List of television and films credits
Year	Title	Role	Notes
1992	Hirake! Ponkikki	Rabbit	
1993	Ichigo hakusho	Reiko Endo	
1994	Toki o Kakeru Shōjo	Miyoko Yoshiyama	
1995	Watashi, Mikata Desu		
1995	Station		
1995	Shounan Liverpool Gakuin		
1996	That's Cunning! Shijō Saidai no Sakusen?	Morishita Yumi	Film debut
1996	Gakko II		Cameo
2000	Yonigeya Honpo		
2011	The Reason I Can't Find My Love	Herself	Cameo; Episode 9

== Concert tours ==
=== Japan tours ===
- First Anniversary Live (1996)
- A Walk in the Park Tour (1997)
- Concentration 20 Tour (1997)
- Break the Rules Tour (2001)
- "AmR" Tour '01 (2001)
- Fan Space '04 (2004)
- Space of Hip-Pop (2005)
- Live Style 2006 (2006)
- Past<Future Tour (2010)
- Live Style 2011 (2011)
- Feel Tour (2013)
- Live Style 2014 (2014)
- Live Style 2016-2017 (2016–2017)

=== International tours ===
- Genius 2000 Tour (2000)
- So Crazy Tour (2003–2004)
- Play Tour (2007-2008)
- Best Fiction Tour (2008–2009)
- 5 Major Domes Tour (2012-2013)
- Livegenic Tour (2015–2016)
- Final Tour ~Finally~ (2017–2018)

== Video games ==
- Digital Dance Mix Vol. 1 Namie Amuro (1997, Sega Saturn)

== See also ==
- J-pop
- Japanese popular culture
- Honorific nicknames in popular music
- List of best-selling music artists in Japan
- List of best-selling singles in Japan
- List of best-selling albums in Japan
- Japan Record Awards
- MTV Video Music Awards Japan
- Billboard Japan Music Awards
