= Try Me (Watashi o Shinjite) =

Single by Namie Amuro with Super Monkey's

from the album Original Tracks Vol.1
- B-side: "Memories (Ashita no Tame ni)"
- Released: 25 January 1995
- Recorded: 3:59
- Genre: Eurobeat; Hi-NRG; J-pop
- Label: Eastworld; Toshiba-EMI
- Songwriter(s): Kazumi Suzuki
- Producer(s): Dave Rodgers

Namie Amuro with Super Monkey's singles chronology
"Paradise Train" (1994)	"Try Me (Watashi o Shinjite)" (1995)	"Taiyou no Season" (1995)

"Try Me" is a song originally recorded by English singer Lolita, written by Hinoky Team with production from Italian producer Dave Rodgers. Avex Trax released the song on 21 December 1994 as Lolita's first and only single from the album of the same name. A month later, Japanese girl group Namie Amuro with Super Monkey's recorded their own rendition of the track, subtitled "Try Me (Watashi o Shinjite)" (Try Me (私を信じて), Translate: "Believe Me").

The song with a new track called "Memories (Ashita no Tame ni)" was released as the fifth single overall from the group. It peaked to number 8 on the Oricon chart, marking their highest-charted song at the time, selling 733,000 copies in the country. The group performed the track at the 37th Japan Record Awards.

The song later made its appearance on Amuro's commercial for the sportswear brand Minami in the same year.

== Release ==
"Memories (Ashita no Tame ni)" is a translation from Norma Sheffield's "Memories".

The song later appeared on two of Amuro's compilations Original Tracks Vol.1 and 181920. A new mix with the extended version of the song appeared on Amuro's first studio album Dance Tracks Vol. 1 (1995).

The single reached #8 on the weekly Oricon charts and charted for 25 weeks. It sold 732,950 copies, becoming the #45 single of 1995.

== Track listing ==
No.	Title	Length
1.	"Try Me (Watashi wo Shinjite)"	3:59
2.	"Memories (Ashita no tame ni)"	4:04
3.	"Try Me (Watashi wo Shinjite)" (Original Karaoke)	4:00
4.	"Memories (Ashita no tame ni)" (Original Karaoke)	4:00
