= Hisako Arakaki =

Japanese singer (born 1977)

- Born: 1977 (age 48–49); Okinawa, Japan
- Occupation: Singer

Hisako Arakaki (新垣 寿子, Arakaki Hisako; born 8 August 1977) is a J-pop singer from Okinawa, Japan, and an original member of the group Super Monkey's. She left at the end of 1993, and later worked as a dance instructor at the Okinawa Actors School.
