= Ritsuko Matsuda =

Japanese singer (born 1977)

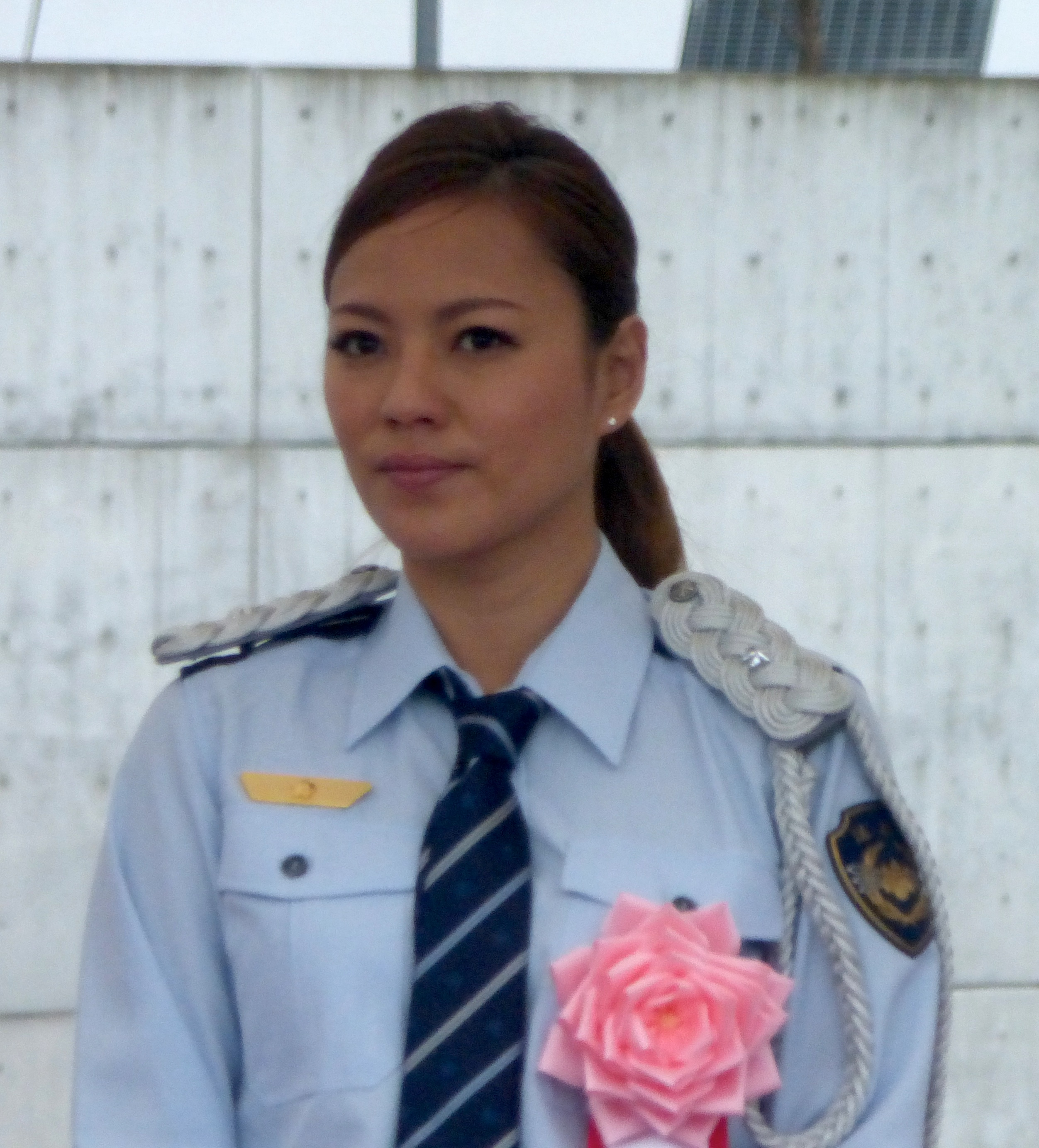
Ritsuko Matsuda in 2016

Ritsuko Matsuda (松田 律子, Matsuda Ritsuko; born 26 February 1977) is the birth name of LINA, a J-pop singer from Okinawa, Japan, and a member of the group Super Monkey's from 1995. After the group disbanded, she formed the group MAX with other Super Monkey's vocalists.

== See also ==
- Super Monkey's
- MAX
