= Anna Makino =

Anna Makino 牧野 アンナ
- Born: 4 December 1971 (age 54); Okinawa, Japan
- Occupation: Dance choreographer
- Relatives: Masahiro Makino (grandfather); Yukiko Todoroki (grandmother)
- Musical career

Anna Makino (牧野アンナ, Makino Anna; born 4 December 1971) is a Japanese singer, and an original member of the group Super Monkey's. She was born in Okinawa, Japan and is the granddaughter of film director Masahiro Makino. She made her debut as a solo J-pop singer on 22 January 1987, aged 15. Her first song "Love Song Sagashite" was adopted for the promotion song of a video game Dragon Quest II, having a NES/Famicom synth version on the load screen. She released another single, "Hitomi ha genkina Sky Blue". She stayed in Tokyo, going to dance school and appearing in musicals for a year before returning to Okinawa to teach at the Okinawa Actors' School, where her father, founder Masayuki Makino was president.

At 20, Anna decided to try her luck in show business again, becoming the oldest member of the group Super Monkey's. She left in 1992 (being replaced by Rino Nakasone), to become the chief dance instructor at Okinawa Actor's, where she worked until 2002, when she left to start her own dance school, 'Love Junx', for children with Down syndrome.

== See also ==
- Super Monkey's
