= Super Monkey's =

Japanese girl group

Super Monkeys
- Origin: Okinawa, Japan
- Genres: Pop; Eurobeat
- Years active: 1991–1996
- Label: Toshiba EMI
- Spinoffs: MAX
- Past members: Namie Amuro (1991–1995); Nanako Takushi (1991–1996); Minako Ameku (1991–1996); Anna Makino (1991-1992, 1993); Hisako Arakaki (1991–1994); Rino Nakasone (1992–1993); Reina Miyauchi (1994–1996); Ritsuko Matsuda (1994–1996)

Super Monkey's (スーパー・モンキーズ, Sūpā Monkīzu) was a Japanese pop-singing and dancing group that spawned the careers of Namie Amuro and some members of the girl group MAX. The group was active from 1991 to 1996.

== History ==
=== Pre-debut ===
The group was originally part of a larger 15-member group Club Heart including the future lead singer of Super Monkey's, Namie Amuro. Their name was changed to Super Monkey's before their debut on September 16, 1992. In a magazine interview, Amuro revealed that the Super Monkey's were supposed to debut as a co-ed group with 5 female members and two male members. The concept was changed and the Super Monkey's made their debut as a five-piece all-girl group with members Namie Amuro, Anna Makino, Hisako Arakaki, Nanako Takushi, and Minako Ameku.

=== Super Monkey's (1992–93) ===
The Super Monkey's officially debuted on September 16, 1992, with the double A-side single, "Koi no Cute Beat / Mister U.S.A." on the Toshiba EMI label. The group was promoted as a teen idol group with an American pop music sensibility. Their debut single was a moderate hit debuting within the top 30 of the Oricon charts. Makino, who was considered their leader, left the group in December of that year. She was replaced by Rino Nakasone, who was announced as a new member of the group in magazine promotions, and was scheduled to perform publicly with the group at the Sapporo Snow Festival in February 1993, but couldn't due to appendicitis. Nakasone left the group without recording any material and was not replaced following her departure.

=== Super Monkey's 4 (1993-94) ===
The group released their second single, "Dancing Junk" in May 1993 under a new name, Super Monkey's 4. It was not as successful as their first release. Following the release of the single, the group took part in an ensemble singing unit, PJG, for NHK music show, Pop Jam, with several other teen idols. A third single, "Aishite Muscat" was released in November that year and peaked in the top 70. The group's former leader Anna Makino briefly returned to the group, making an appearance in a Lotte Muscat Chewing Gum commercial.

=== Namie Amuro with Super Monkey's (1994–96) ===
As Amuro began to gain notoriety from acting and modeling gigs, the group name was changed again to Namie Amuro with Super Monkey's. The group became regulars of the karaoke television program, Yoru mo Hippare in April 1994. They released their fourth single, "Paradise Train" in July 1994. The single was the group's worst performing single, failing to reach the top 100. The single has no official ranking as Oricon only monitored the top 100 releases at the time. Hisako Arakaki left the group shortly after the release of the single and was replaced by two new members. Reina Miyauchi and Ritsuko Matsuda joined the group in late October 1994 and made their official debut with the group on January 25, 1995, with the release of their fifth single, "Try Me ~Watashi o Shinjite~." The song, a Japanese language cover of Lolita's "Try Me", was a major hit, peaking within the top 10 and selling over 700,000 copies. It was the first of three singles produced by Max Matsuura.

After the success of the single, Matsuura suggested that Amuro could become a solo act while the other members of the Super Monkey's formed a new girl group. In April, the single "Taiyou no Season" was released and accredited solely to Amuro although the background vocals were performed by the other members of Super Monkey's. Those other members, Nanako, Minako, Reina, and Ritsuko formed the group MAX, named after Matsuura, and signed to fledgling dance label, Avex Trax. They released their debut single, "Koi Suru Velfarre Dance ~Saturday night~" in May. Super Monkey's released their final single together, "Stop the Music" in July. As MAX, they released their debut album, Dance Tracks Vol.1 in October. Days following the release of their debut album, Amuro released her first single under the helm of producer, Tetsuya Komuro, "Body Feels Exit".

=== Post-disbandment ===
Following the disbandment of the group, lead vocalist Namie Amuro began a solo career, joining former band members MAX at Avex Trax. Paired with producer Tetsuya Komuro, Amuro went on to become one of the most successful Japanese musical acts in history. Her status as a fashion icon was solidified after the emergence of the Amura boom made her a cultural phenomenon. Following the success of her breakthrough album, Sweet 19 Blues (1996), the Super Monkey's former label, Toshiba EMI, released a greatest hits compilation, Original Tracks Vol.1 (1996). MAX continued to release their own material after the official disbandment of the Super Monkey's. However, they continued to perform with Amuro under the Super Monkey's name for her first two singles with Avex, "Body Feels Exit" and "Chase the Chance". MAX retired the Super Monkey's name and completely parted ways with Amuro after her 1996 show at Chiba Marine Stadium. MAX eventually came into their own success that same year with the release of their third single, "Tora Tora Tora". The group would go on to surpass the success of the Super Monkey's selling several million albums and attaining a number one single with "Give me a Shake" released in 1997. Both Amuro and MAX have continued to be active recording artists over a decade following the group's break up.

Original member Anna Makino returned to Okinawa Actors School following her departure from the group. She became chief dance instructor at the school before leaving her position in 2002 to open another dance school for children diagnosed with Down syndrome called Love Junx. Hisako Arakaki who left the group in 1994 also returned to Okinawa to become an instructor at the school. She would join and become the leader of B.B. Waves, the school's own dance unit that fostered the talents of future school graduates, Speed, Rina Chinen, Da Pump, D&D, Yu Yamada and Meisa Kuroki.

In 2006, Amuro, Makino, Arakaki and Ameku came together for an original Super Monkey's reunion piece in a pamphlet for Amuro's "Live Style 2006" tour. Takushi did not participate.

== Discography ==
=== Albums ===
• Dance Tracks Vol.1 (1995)

• Original Tracks Vol.1 (1996)

Singles

• September 16, 1992 : Koi no Cute Beat/Mister U.S.A

• May 26, 1993 : Dancing Junk

• November 5, 1993 : Aishite Muscat

• July 20, 1994 : Paradise Train

• January 25, 1995 : Try me (Watashi o Shinjite)

== See also ==
- Namie Amuro
- MAX
