= Nanako Takushi =

Japanese J-pop singer

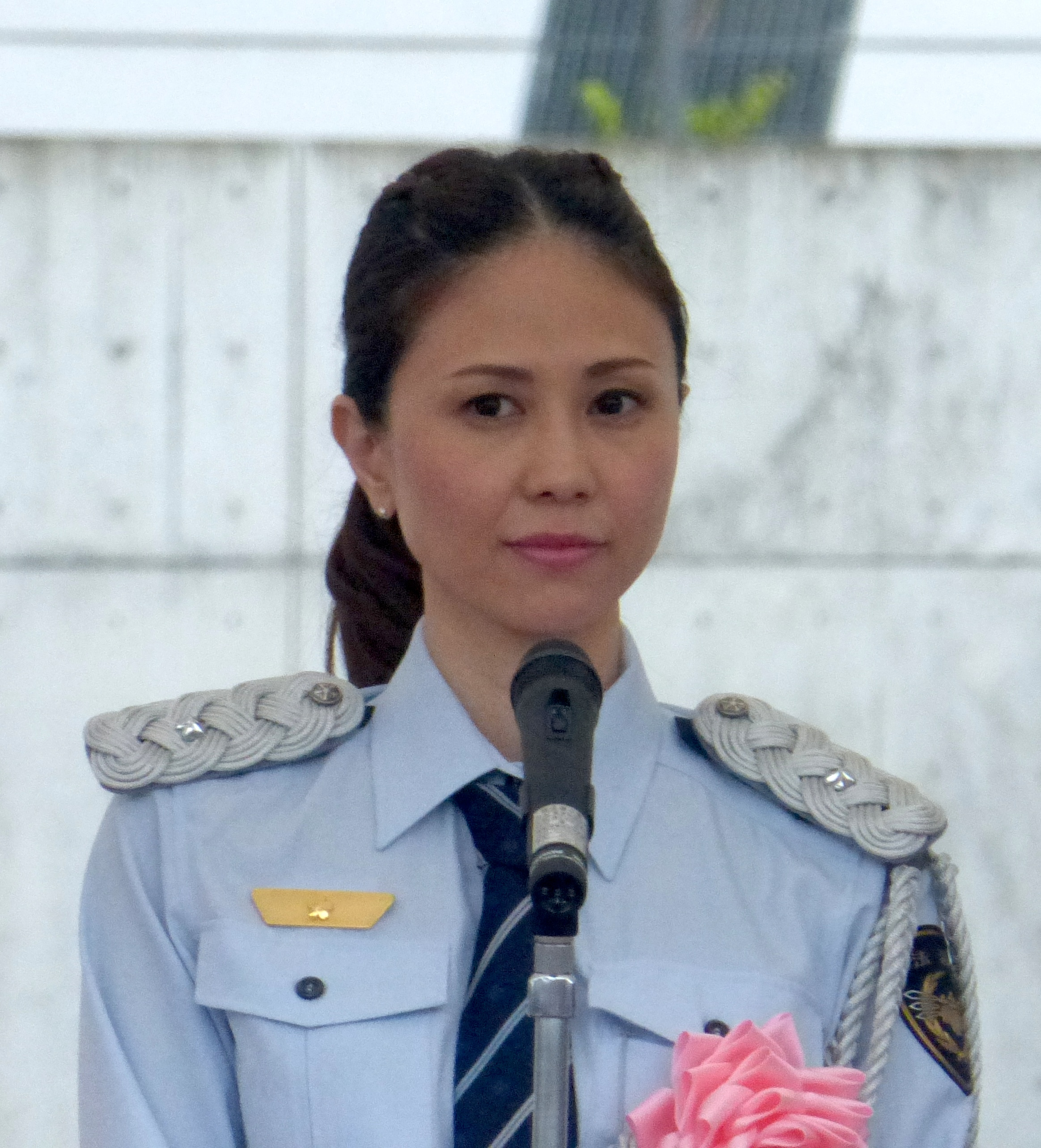
Nanako Takushi (2016)

Nanako Takushi (澤岻 奈々子, Takushi Nanako; born 25 March 1976) is a Japanese pop singer from Okinawa, Japan, and an original member of the group Super Monkey's. After the group disbanded, she formed the group MAX with other Super Monkey's vocalists.

== See also ==
- Super Monkey's
- MAX
