= Namie Amuro discography =

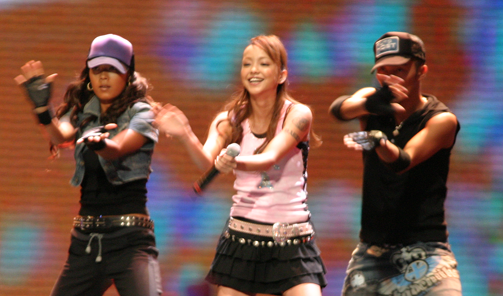
- Amuro performing at the MTV Asia Aid 2005
- Studio albums: 12
- Live albums: 10
- Compilation albums: 7
- Singles: 47
- Video albums: 14
- Music videos: 102
- Promotional singles: 20

The discography of Japanese recording artist Namie Amuro contains 12 studio albums, 7 compilation albums, 47 singles, 10 live albums, 14 video albums and 102 music videos. Amuro has also collaborated with Verbal of M-Flo and Ryōsuke Imai for her Suite Chic project.

Namie Amuro made her musical debut as the lead vocalist of Super Monkey's in 1992 under the label Toshiba EMI. In 1995, she released her first single as a solo artist, "Taiyou no Season", under the same label. That same year, she released her first studio album Dance Tracks Vol.1, which topped the Oricon weekly chart and charted for forty-four weeks and has sold over 2,000,000 copies. Only nine days after its release, Amuro released "Body Feels Exit", her first single under her new label Avex Trax.

In 1996, Amuro released her first album under Avex Trax titled Sweet 19 Blues, which reached number one on the Oricon Album Chart with 1,921,850 copies sold in its opening week, selling over 3 million units in Japan during its original chart run. Her 1997 single "Can You Celebrate?" sold over 2.2 million, making it Japan's best selling single by a solo female artist and the best selling single of that year. The single was followed by the highly successful album Concentration 20. Her first greatest hits album 181920 was released prior to her hiatus in 1998.

After a leave of absence, Amuro returned to the music scene with the 2000 album Genius 2000. In 2005, she released her sixth studio album, Queen of Hip-Pop, went on the 2nd place the Oricon weekly charta, and almost doubled the sale of her previous albums. It also topped the charts in Taiwan.

Her seventh studio album, Play (2007), debuted at the top of the charts, outselling her previous album. It and was followed by 60s 70s 80s (2008), which reached number one on the Oricon weekly and the monthly chart. On July 30, 2008, Amuro released her third greatest hits album, Best Fiction. It spent six consecutive weeks at the number one position on the Oricon weekly charts. Selling over 1,840,088 copies, it won Best Album of the Year at the 50th Japan Record Awards.

== Albums ==
=== Studio albums ===
List of albums, with selected chart positions
Title	Album details	Peak positions					Sales (Note: Sales provided by Oricon database and are rounded to the nearest thousand copies.)	Certifications
Title	Album details	JPN	KOR (Note: The Gaon Albums Chart was established in 2010.)	KOR Intl. (Note: Week references for Gaon: Past < Future, Checkmate!, Uncontrolled, Feel, Ballada.)	TWN (Note: Week references for G-Music: Queen of Hip-Pop 2005 week 28, Play 2007 week 27, Best Fiction 2008 week 31, Past < Future 2009 week 51, Checkmate! 2011 week 18, Uncontrolled 2012 week 26, Feel 2013 week 28, Ballada 2014 week 25, Genic, Finally.)	TWN East Asia	Sales	Certifications
Dance Tracks Vol. 1	Release: October 16, 1995; Label: Toshiba-EMI; Formats: CD	1	—	—	—	—	JPN: 1,865,000	RIAJ: 2× Million
Sweet 19 Blues	Release: July 22, 1996; Label: Avex Trax; Formats: CD, digital download, Playbutton	1	—	—	—	—	JPN: 3,700,000	RIAJ: 3× Million
Concentration 20	Release: July 24, 1997; Label: Avex Trax; Formats: CD, digital download, Playbutton	1	—	—	4	—	JPN: 1,930,000	RIAJ: 2× Million
Genius 2000	Release: January 26, 2000; Label: Avex Trax; Formats: CD, LP, digital download, Playbutton	1	—	—	—	—	JPN: 803,000	RIAJ: 3× Platinum (Note: Received a 2× Platinum certification for 800,000 copies, however the 2× Platinum threshold was redefined as 500,000 copies in 2003.)
Break the Rules	Release: December 20, 2000; Label: Avex Trax; Formats: CD, digital download, Playbutton	2	—	—	—	—	JPN: 335,000	RIAJ: Platinum
Style	Release: December 10, 2003; Label: Avex Trax; Formats: CD, digital download, Playbutton	4	—	—	—	—	JPN: 250,000; KOR: 5,500	RIAJ: Platinum
Queen of Hip-Pop	Release: July 13, 2005; Label: Avex Trax; Formats: CD, digital download, Playbutton	2	—	—	2	1	JPN: 494,000; KOR: 3,700	RIAJ: 2× Platinum
Play	Release: June 27, 2007; Label: Avex Trax; Formats: CD, CD/DVD, digital download, Playbutton	1	—	—	2	1	JPN: 541,000	RIAJ: 2× Platinum
Past < Future	Release: December 16, 2009; Label: Avex Trax; Formats: CD, CD/DVD, digital download, Playbutton	1	1	82 (Note: Released prior to the establishment of the Gaon chart.)	1	1	JPN: 600,000	RIAJ: 2× Platinum
Uncontrolled	Release: June 27, 2012; Label: Avex Trax; Formats: CD, CD/DVD, CD/Blu-ray, digital download, Playbutton	1	36	8	5	2	JPN: 541,000	RIAJ: 2× Platinum
Feel	Release: July 10, 2013; Label: Dimension Point; Formats: CD, CD/DVD, CD/Blu-ray, digital download	1	25	5	6	1	JPN: 393,000	RIAJ: Platinum
Genic	Release: June 10, 2015; Label: Avex Trax; Formats: CD, CD/DVD, CD/Blu-ray, digital download	1	—	—	—	1	JPN: 253,000	RIAJ: Platinum
"—" denotes items which were released before the creation of the G-Music or Gaon Charts, or items that did not chart.

=== Compilation albums ===
List of albums, with selected chart positions
Title	Album details	Peak positions					Sales	Certifications
Title	Album details	JPN	KOR	KOR Intl.	TWN	TWN East Asia	Sales	Certifications
Original Tracks Vol.1	As Namie Amuro with Super Monkey's; Released: September 30, 1996; Label: Toshiba-EMI; Formats: CD	3	—	—	—	—	JPN: 419,000	RIAJ: Platinum
181920	Released: January 28, 1998; Label: Avex Trax; Formats: CD, CD/DVD, digital download, Playbutton	1	—	—	—	—	JPN: 2,000,000	RIAJ: 2× Million
Love Enhanced Single Collection	Released: March 13, 2002; Label: Avex Trax; Formats: CD, DVD-Audio, digital download, Playbutton	3	—	—	—	—	JPN: 305,000	RIAJ: Platinum
Best Fiction	Released: July 30, 2008; Label: Avex Trax; Formats: CD, CD/DVD, digital download, Playbutton	1	—	—	2	1	JPN: 1,590,000	RIAJ: Million
Checkmate!	Collaborations compilation album; Released: April 27, 2011; Label: Avex Trax; Formats: CD, CD/DVD, digital download, Playbutton	1	29	5	6	1	JPN: 500,000	RIAJ: 2× Platinum
Ballada	Ballad compilation album; Released: June 4, 2014; Label: Dimension Point; Formats: CD, CD/DVD, CD/Blu-ray, digital download	1	35	6	6	1	JPN: 500,000	RIAJ: 2× Platinum
Finally	Compilation album with songs from her whole career and 7 new songs.; Released: November 8, 2017; Label: Dimension Point; Formats: CD, CD/DVD, CD/Blu-ray, digital download	1	51	—	—	1	JPN: 2,451,651	RIAJ: 2× Million
"—" denotes items which were released before the creation of the G-Music or Gaon Charts, or items that did not chart.

=== Live albums ===
List of albums
Title	Album details
Namie Amuro 5 Major Domes Tour 2012: 20th Anniversary Best	Released: March 27, 2013; Label: Avex Trax; Formats: rental CD
Namie Amuro Feel Tour 2013	Released: March 26, 2014; Label: Avex Trax; Formats: rental CD
Live Style 2014	Released: February 11, 2015; Label: Avex Trax; Formats: rental CD
Live Style 2014: Live Ballada	Released: March 11, 2015; Label: Avex Trax; Formats: rental CD
Namie Amuro Final Tour 2018 〜Finally〜 at Tokyo Dome 2018.6.3	Released: June 16, 2019; Label: Stella 88; Formats: digital download
Namie Amuro 25th Anniversary Live in Okinawa at Ginowan Kaihin Koen Yagai Tokusetsu Kaijo 2017.9.16	Released: June 16, 2019; Label: Stella 88; Formats: digital download

== Singles ==
=== As lead artist ===
==== 1990s ====
List of singles, with selected chart positions
Title	Year	Peak chart positions			Sales (JPN)	Certifications	Album
Title	Year	JPN	JPN Hot (Note: Sources for chart positions are as follows: "Sweet 19 Blues", "Can You Celebrate? featuring Taro Hakase".)	KOR Intl. (Note: Week references for Gaon: "Put 'Em Up", "Can You Celebrate?")	Sales (JPN)	Certifications	Album
"Taiyou no Season" (太陽のSeason; "Season of the Sun") (Note: Performed with the Super Monkey's, however billed as the solo performer.)	1995	5	—	—	611,000	RIAJ (physical): Platinum	Dance Tracks Vol. 1
"Stop the Music"	1995	4	—	—	528,000	RIAJ (physical): Platinum	Dance Tracks Vol. 1
"Body Feels Exit"	1995	3	92	—	882,000	RIAJ (physical): Platinum	Sweet 19 Blues
"Chase the Chance"	1995	1	96	—	1,362,000	RIAJ (physical): Million (Note: Later certified 3× Platinum, which before June 2003 indicated 1,200,000 copies shipped.)	Sweet 19 Blues
"Don't Wanna Cry"	1996	1	27	—	1,390,000	RIAJ (physical): Million; RIAJ (download): Gold	Sweet 19 Blues
"You're My Sunshine"	1996	1	—	—	1,099,000	RIAJ (physical): Million	Sweet 19 Blues
"Sweet 19 Blues"	1996	2	54	—	453,000	RIAJ (physical): Platinum	Sweet 19 Blues
"A Walk in the Park"	1996	1	97	—	1,067,000	RIAJ (physical): Million	Concentration 20
"Can You Celebrate?"	1997	1	14	49 (Note: Charted in 2011.)	2,750,000	RIAJ (physical, 8 cm): 2× Million; RIAJ (physical, 12 cm): Platinum; RIAJ (download): Platinum	Concentration 20
"How to Be a Girl"	1997	1	—	—	772,000	RIAJ (physical): Million	Concentration 20
"Dreaming I Was Dreaming"	1997	1	—	—	559,000	RIAJ (physical): 3× Platinum	181920
"I Have Never Seen"	1998	1	—	—	657,000	RIAJ (physical): 3× Platinum	Genius 2000
"Respect the Power of Love"	1999	2	—	—	492,000	RIAJ (physical): Platinum	Genius 2000
"Toi et Moi"	1999	3	—	—	272,000	RIAJ (physical): Gold	non-album single
"Something 'bout the Kiss"	1999	3 (Note: 12cm edition position.)	—	—	369,000	RIAJ (physical, 8 cm): Gold; RIAJ (physical, 12 cm): Gold	Genius 2000
"—" denotes items which were released before the creation of the Billboard Hot 100 or G-Music charts, or items that did not chart.

==== 2000s ====
List of singles, with selected chart positions
Title	Year	Peak chart positions					Sales (JPN)	Certifications	Album
Title	Year	JPN	JPN Hot (Note: Sources for chart positions are as follows: "Wild", "Dr.".)	KOR Intl.	TWN	TWN East Asia (Note: Week references for G-Music: "Wild/Dr." 2009 week 12, "Break It/Get Myself Back" 2010 week 31, "Naked/Fight Together/Tempest" 2011 week 31, "Sit! Stay! Wait! Down!/Love Story" 2011 week 50, "Go Round/Yeah-Oh!" 2012 week 12, "Big Boys Cry/Beautiful" 2013 week 11, "Tsuki" 2014 week 5 and 2014 week 6, "Grotesque" 2014 week 15 for "Brighter Day", "Revolution", "Red Carpet".)	Sales (JPN)	Certifications	Album
"Love 2000" (Note: Officially released on January 1, 2000, however was available for purchase in December 1999 due to businesses closing for new years holidays. The sales amount and ranking indicated for the first week of the single are combined from two weeks of sales as Oricon does not rank single during the New Years week.)	2000	4	—	—	—	—	228,000	RIAJ (physical): Platinum	Genius 2000
"Never End"	2000	2	71	—	—	—	640,000	RIAJ (physical): 3× Platinum	Break the Rules
"Please Smile Again"	2000	2	—	—	—	—	217,000	RIAJ (physical): Gold	Break the Rules
"Think of Me"	2001	7	—	—	—	—	113,000		Break the Rules
"No More Tears"	2001	7	—	—	—	—	113,000		Break the Rules
"Say the Word"	2001	3	—	—	—	—	184,000	RIAJ (physical): Gold; RIAJ (download): Gold	Love Enhanced Single Collection
"I Will"	2002	7	—	—	—	—	95,000		Love Enhanced Single Collection
"Wishing on the Same Star"	2002	2	—	—	—	—	97,000	RIAJ (download): Gold	Style
"Shine More"	2003	8	—	—	—	—	52,000	RIAJ (physical): Gold	Style
"Put 'Em Up"	2003	7	—	77	—	—	41,000		Style
"So Crazy"	2003	8	—	—	—	—	49,000		Style
"Come"	2003	8	—	—	—	—	49,000		Style
"Alarm"	2004	11	60	—	—	—	58,000		Queen of Hip-Pop
"All for You"	2004	6	—	—	—	—	113,000	RIAJ (physical): Gold; RIAJ (download): Gold	Queen of Hip-Pop
"Girl Talk"	2004	2	—	—	—	—	107,000	RIAJ (physical): Gold; RIAJ (download): Gold	Queen of Hip-Pop
"The Speed Star"	2004	2	—	—	—	—	107,000	RIAJ (physical): Gold	non-album track
"Want Me, Want Me"	2005	2	—	—	—	—	103,000	RIAJ (physical): Gold	Queen of Hip-Pop
"White Light"	2005	7	—	—	—	—	73,000	RIAJ (physical): Gold; RIAJ (download): Gold	Best Fiction
"Violet Sauce"	2005	7	—	—	—	—	73,000	RIAJ (physical): Gold	Play
"Can't Sleep, Can't Eat, I'm Sick"	2006	2	—	—	—	—	80,000	RIAJ (physical): Gold	Play
"Ningyo" (人魚; Mermaid)	2006	2	—	—	—	—	80,000	RIAJ (physical): Gold	non-album track
"Baby Don't Cry"	2007	3	26	—	—	—	144,000	RIAJ (ringtone): Million; RIAJ (download): 3× Platinum; RIAJ (physical): Gold	Play
"Funky Town"	2007	3	—	—	—	—	54,000	RIAJ (ringtone): 2× Platinum; RIAJ (download): Gold; RIAJ (physical): Gold	Play
"New Look" (Note: Triple A-side single, titled '60s 70s 80s', including "New Look", "Rock Steady" and "What a Feeling".)	2008	1	1	—	—	—	293,000	RIAJ (physical): Platinum; RIAJ (ringtone): 3× Platinum; RIAJ (download): 2× Platinum	Best Fiction
"Rock Steady"	2008	1	—	—	—	—		RIAJ (download): Gold	Best Fiction
"What a Feeling"	2008	1	28	—	—	—		RIAJ (download): Platinum	Best Fiction
"Wild"	2009	1	1	—	5	3	119,000	RIAJ (physical): Gold; RIAJ (cellphone): Gold	Past < Future
"Dr."	2009	1	39	—	5	3	119,000	RIAJ (physical): Gold; RIAJ (cellphone): Gold	Past < Future
"—" denotes items which were released before the creation of the G-Music Chart or the Billboard Japan Hot 100.

==== 2010s ====
List of singles, with selected chart positions
Title	Year	Peak chart positions				Sales (JPN)	Certifications	Album
Title	Year	JPN	JPN Hot (Note: Sources for chart positions are as follows: "Break It", "Get Myself Back", "Naked", "Fight Together", "Sit! Stay! Wait! Down!", "Love Story", "Go Round", "Yeah-Oh!", "Damage", "Big Boys Cry", "Contrail", "Tsuki", "Brighter Day", "Red Carpet".)	TWN	TWN East Asia	Sales (JPN)	Certifications	Album
"Break It"	2010	3	16	11	3	85,000	RIAJ (physical): Gold; RIAJ (download): Gold	Uncontrolled
"Get Myself Back"	2010	3	2	11	3	85,000	RIAJ (physical): Gold; RIAJ (cellphone): Gold	Uncontrolled
"Naked"	2011	2	2	11	2	101,000	RIAJ (physical): Gold; RIAJ (download): Gold	Uncontrolled
"Fight Together"	2011	2	16	11	2	101,000	RIAJ (physical): Gold; RIAJ (download): 2× Platinum	Uncontrolled
"Tempest"	2011	2	—	11	2	101,000	RIAJ (physical): Gold	Uncontrolled
"Sit! Stay! Wait! Down!"	2011	3	3	11	3	162,000	RIAJ (download): Platinum; RIAJ (physical): Gold	Uncontrolled
"Love Story"	2011	3	2	11	3	162,000	RIAJ (ringtone): Million; RIAJ (download): Million; RIAJ (physical): Gold; RIAJ (streaming): Gold	Uncontrolled
"Go Round"	2012	4	2	5	3	65,000	RIAJ (physical): Gold; RIAJ (download): Gold	Uncontrolled
"Yeah-Oh!"	2012	4	34	5	3	65,000	RIAJ (physical): Gold	Uncontrolled
"Damage" (Note: Released digitally, so ineligible to chart on Oricon or G-Music.)	2012	—	4	—	—		RIAJ (download): Gold	non-album track
"Big Boys Cry"	2013	4	4	13	2	32,000		Feel
"Beautiful"	2013	4	—	13	2	32,000		non-album track
"Contrail"	2013	—	8	—	—		RIAJ (download): Platinum	Feel
"Tsuki"	2014	3	3	12	1	67,000	RIAJ (download): Platinum	Ballada
"Brighter Day"	2014	8	3	5	1	53,000	RIAJ (download): Platinum	non-album track
"Red Carpet"	2015	2	5	—	5	36,000		Finally
"Mint"	2016	4	2	—	6	46,000	RIAJ (download): Platinum	Finally
"Hero"	2016	6	1	1	1	85,000	RIAJ (download): 3× Platinum; RIAJ (physical): Gold; RIAJ (streaming): Gold	Finally
"Dear Diary"	2016	3	7	—	—	64,000	RIAJ (download): Gold	Finally
"Fighter"	2016	3	15	—	—	64,000		Finally
"Just You and I"	2017	6	2	—	1	35,000	RIAJ (download): Gold	Finally
"—" denotes items did not chart or were not released in that region.

=== As featured artist ===
List of singles, with selected chart positions
Title	Year	Peak chart positions				Sales (JPN)	Certifications	Album
Title	Year	JPN	JPN Hot (Note: Sources for chart positions are as follows: "Black Diamond", "Rock U", "Fake", "Waterfalls", "Grotesque", "Revolution".)	TWN	TWN East Asia	Sales (JPN)	Certifications	Album
"Issun Momo Kintarō" (一寸桃金太郎) (among Sister Rabbits)	1995	100	—	—	—	3,000		non-album single
"You Are the One" (among TK Presents Konetto)	1997	1	—	—	—	1,225,000		non-album single
"Lovin' It" (with Verbal)	2001	8	—	—	—	72,000	RIAJ (physical): Gold	Song Nation
"Do What U Gotta Do" (Zeebra featuring Ai, Namie Amuro and Mummy-D)	2006	—	—	—	—		RIAJ (download): Gold	The New Beginning
"Black Diamond" (Double and Namie Amuro)	2008	—	30	—	—		RIAJ (ringtone): 2× Platinum; RIAJ (cellphone): Gold	The Best Collaborations
"Rock U" (Ravex featuring Namie Amuro)	2009	—	61	—	—			Trax
"Fake" (Ai featuring Namie Amuro)	2010	8	5	—	—	16,000	RIAJ (cellphone): Gold	The Last Ai
"Waterfalls (20th Anniversary Edition)" (TLC featuring Namie Amuro)	2013	—	12	—	—			TLC 20: 20th Anniversary Hits
"Grotesque" (グロテスク) (Ken Hirai featuring Namie Amuro)	2014	4	4	17	3	51,000	RIAJ (download): Platinum	non-album single
"Revolution" (Crystal Kay featuring Namie Amuro)	2015	6	8	—N/a	4	19,000		Shine
"—" denotes items which were released before the creation of the G-Music Chart or the Billboard Japan Hot 100, did not chart or were not released in that region.

=== Promotional singles ===
List of promotional singles, with selected chart positions
Title	Year	Peak chart positions	Certifications	Album
Title	Year	JPN Hot (Note: Sources for chart positions are as follows: "New Look", "What a Feeling", "Do Me More", "Fast Car", "My Love", "Wonder Woman", "Make It Happen", "Only You", "In the Spotlight (Tokyo)", "Hands on Me", "Heaven", "La La La", "Birthday",)	Certifications	Album
"WoWa"	2005	—		Queen of Hip-Pop
"Hide and Seek"	2007	—	RIAJ (ringtone): 2× Platinum; RIAJ (download): Gold	Play
"Do Me More"	2008	14	RIAJ (ringtone): 2× Platinum; RIAJ (download): Platinum	Best Fiction
"Sexy Girl"	2008	—	RIAJ (download): Gold	Best Fiction
"My Love"	2009	42		Past<Future
"Fast Car"	2009	5		Past<Future
"The Meaning of Us"	2010	—	RIAJ (cellphone): Gold	Past<Future
"Wonder Woman" (featuring Ai and Anna Tsuchiya)	2011	5	RIAJ (download): Platinum	Checkmate!
"Make It Happen" (featuring After School)	2011	73	RIAJ (download): Gold	Checkmate!
"Only You"	2012	7	RIAJ (download): Gold	Uncontrolled
"In the Spotlight (Tokyo)"	2012	46	RIAJ (download): Gold	Uncontrolled
"Hands on Me"	2013	19		Feel
"Heaven"	2013	26		Feel
"La La La"	2013	53		Feel
"Birthday"	2015	36		Genic
"Golden Touch"	2015	— (Note: Charted at number 43 on the Billboard Radio Songs Chart.)		Genic
"Finally"	2017	30		Finally
"Hope"	2018	16	RIAJ (download): Gold	Finally
"—" denotes items that were released before the creation of the Japan Hot 100.

== Other charted songs ==
List of promotional singles, with selected chart positions
Title	Year	Peak chart positions
Title	Year	JPN Hot (Note: Sources for chart positions are as follows: "Neon Light Lipstick", "Ballerina", "Sweet Kisses", "Still Lovin' You". "Black Make Up".)
"Neonlight Lipstick"	2013	16
"Ballerina"	2013	25
"Sweet Kisses"	2014	56
"Still Lovin' You"	2014	49
"Black Make Up"	2015	96

== Other appearances ==
List of non-studio album or guest appearances that feature Namie Amuro that were not singles or promotional singles
Title	Year	Album
"Joy" (m.c.A.T featuring Namie Amuro)	1996	Crossover
"After Party" (Zeebra featuring Namie Amuro)	2003	Tokyo's Finest
"After Party" (Live) (Zeebra featuring Namie Amuro)	2005	The Live Animal 03 Japan Tour Tokyo's Finest
"Do or Die" (Jhett aka Yakko for Aquarius featuring Namie Amuro)	2005	Jhett aka Yakko for Aquarius
"Do or Die (Bach Logic Remix featuring Norisham-X)" (Jhett aka Yakko for Aquarius featuring Namie Amuro)	2005	Jhett Black Edition
"Luvotomy" (M-Flo loves Namie Amuro)	2007	Cosmicolor
"Do What U Gotta Do" (Live) (Zeebra featuring Ai, Namie Amuro and Mummy-D)	2007	Zeebra Japan Tour Final: The Live Animal '06
"Luvotomy (Camp Three-o-three Remix)" (M-Flo loves Namie Amuro)	2007	Electricolor: Complete Remix
"Luvotomy" (Live) (M-Flo loves Namie Amuro)	2007	M-Flo Tour 2007 Cosmicolor @ Yokohama Arena
"Black Diamond" (Live) (Double and Namie Amuro)	2008	Double Best Live We R&B
"What a Feeling (Shinichi Osawa Remix) (Teppan-Yaki Edit)"	2009	Teppan-yaki: A Collection of Remixes
"Black Out" (Verbal featuring Lil Wayne and Namie Amuro)	2011	Visionair
"Black Diamond (TinyVoice Electr!ck Remix)" (Double and Namie Amuro)	2011	Woman
"I'm Not Yours" (Jolin Tsai featuring Namie Amuro)	2014	Play
"What I Did for Love" (David Guetta featuring Namie Amuro)	2014	Listen Again

== Videography ==
=== Video albums ===
==== Music video albums ====
List of media, with selected chart positions
Title	Album details	Peak positions		Certifications
Title	Album details	JPN	TWN (Note: Week references for G-Music: Filmography 2001-2005 2005 week 50, Space of Hip-Pop 2006 week 12, Live Style 2006 2007 week 10, Play Tour 2008 week 15, Best Fiction Tour 2009 week 38, Past Future Tour 2010 week 51, Live Style 2011 2012 week 1, 5 Major Domes Tour 2012 2013 week 11, Feel Tour 2013 2014 week 11.)	Certifications
181920 Films	Released: July 1, 1998; Length: 42 minutes; Label: Avex Trax; Formats: VHS, DVD, VCD	99 (Note: 2002 position, as a part of the combined 181920 Films+Filmography set.)	—	
Filmography	Released: March 7, 2001; Length: 43 minutes; Label: Avex Trax; Formats: VHS, DVD, VCD	18	—	
Filmography 2001–2005	Released: December 7, 2005; Length: 56 minutes; Label: Avex Trax; Formats: DVD, VCD	1	3	RIAJ: Gold
"—" denotes items which were released before the creation of the G-Music Chart.

==== Concert albums ====
List of media, with selected chart positions
Title	Album details	Peak positions			Sales	Certifications
Title	Album details	JPN DVD	JPN Blu-ray	TWN	Sales	Certifications
Amuro Namie First Anniversary Live in Marine Stadium	Special guests: M.c.A.T, MAX, Sam, Sheila E., Tetsuya Komuro; Recorded live at the Chiba Marine Stadium, Chiba Prefecture, Japan in 1996.; Released: December 4, 1996; Label: Avex Trax; Length: 111 minutes; Formats: VHS, DVD, VCD	8	—	—	JPN: 5,575	
Namie Amuro Concentration 20 Live in Tokyo Dome	Recorded live at the Tokyo Dome during her Mistio Presents Namie Amuro Summer Stage '97 Concentration 20 tour.; Released: December 3, 1997; Label: Avex Trax; Length: 111 minutes; Formats: VHS, DVD, VCD	17	—	—	JPN: 2,916	
Namie Amuro Tour "Genius 2000"	11,435: Recorded live at the Osaka Jo Hall, Osaka in 2000.; Released: August 18, 2000; Label: Avex Trax; Length: 110 minutes; Formats: VHS, DVD, VCD	2	—	—	JPN: 9,856	
Namie Amuro Tour 2001 "Break the Rules"	Recorded live at the Yoyogi Stadium, Tokyo in 2001.; Released: November 19, 2003; Label: Avex Trax; Length: 106 minutes; Formats: VHS, DVD, VCD	14	—	—	JPN: 6,979	
Namie Amuro So Crazy Tour featuring Best Singles 2003–2004	Recorded live at the Tokyo International Forum Hall A, Tokyo in 2004.; Released: September 23, 2004; Label: Avex Trax; Length: 126 minutes; Formats: DVD, VCD	2	—		JPN: 71,101	
Space of Hip-Pop: Namie Amuro Tour 2005	Recorded live at the Tokyo International Forum Hall A, Tokyo in 2005.; Released: March 15, 2006; Label: Avex Trax; Length: 108 minutes; Formats: DVD, VCD, Blu-ray	2	52 (Note: Charted in 2012.)	1	JPN: 83,007	RIAJ: Gold
Namie Amuro Best Tour "Live Style 2006"	Recorded live at the Yoyogi National Gymnasium.; Released: February 21, 2007; Label: Avex Trax; Length: 112 minutes; Formats: DVD, VCD, Blu-ray	1	49	2	JPN: 92,393	RIAJ: Gold
Namie Amuro "Play" Tour 2007-2008	Recorded live at the Tokyo International Forum Hall A, Tokyo in 2007.; Released: February 27, 2008; Label: Avex Trax; Length: 115 minutes; Formats: DVD, VCD, Blu-ray	2	55	1	JPN: 135,010	RIAJ: Gold
Namie Amuro Best Fiction Tour 2008–2009	Recorded live at the Taipei Arena in Taipei, Taiwan on June 20 and 21, 2009.; Released: September 9, 2009; Label: Avex Trax; Length: 115 minutes; Formats: DVD, Blu-ray	1	57	1	JPN: 282,155 (DVD); JPN: 14,000 (Blu-ray)	RIAJ: Platinum
Namie Amuro Past < Future Tour 2010	Released: December 15, 2010; Label: Avex Trax; Length: 117 minutes; Formats: DVD, Blu-ray	1	72	1	JPN: 176,114 (DVD); JPN: 25,878 (Blu-ray)	RIAJ: Gold
Namie Amuro Live Style 2011	Released: December 21, 2011; Label: Avex Trax; Formats: DVD, Blu-ray	1	3	1	JPN: 144,522 (DVD); JPN: 32,377 (Blu-ray)	RIAJ: Gold
Namie Amuro 5 Major Domes Tour 2012: 20th Anniversary Best	Released: February 27, 2013; Label: Avex Trax; Formats: DVD, Blu-ray	1	1	2	JPN: 270,650 (DVD); JPN: 84,887 (Blu-ray)	RIAJ: Platinum
Namie Amuro Feel Tour 2013	Released: February 26, 2014; Label: Dimension Point; Formats: DVD, Blu-ray	1	1	1	JPN: 131,568 (DVD); JPN: 44,960 (Blu-ray)	RIAJ: Gold
Namie Amuro Live Style 2014	Released: February 11, 2015; Label: Dimension Point; Formats: DVD, Blu-ray	1	1	—	JPN: 143,820 (DVD); JPN: 51,501 (Blu-ray)	RIAJ: Gold
Namie Amuro Livegenic 2015-2016	Released: March 2, 2016; Label: Dimension Point; Formats: DVD, Blu-ray	1	1	—	JPN: 117,977 (DVD); JPN: 46,126 (Blu-ray)	RIAJ: Gold
Namie Amuro Live Style 2016-2017	Released: May 3, 2017; Label: Dimension Point; Formats: DVD, Blu-ray	1	1	—	JPN: 140,622 (DVD); JPN: 47,828 (Blu-ray)	RIAJ: Gold
Namie Amuro Final Tour 2018: Finally	Released: August 29, 2018; Label: Dimension Point; Formats: DVD, Blu-ray	1	1	—	JPN: 931,000 (DVD); JPN: 806,000 (Blu-ray)	RIAJ: Million
"—" denotes items which were released before the creation of the G-Music or Gaon Charts, or items that did not chart.

==== Other video albums ====
List of media
Title	Album details
DJ Groove	With Brother Tom; Released: September 1, 1995; Label: NTV; Format: VHS

=== Music videos ===
==== As a lead artist ====
#	Title	Year	Director
1	"Mr. USA"	1992	Unknown
2	"Try Me ~Watashi o Shinjite~"	1995	Unknown
3	"Taiyō no Season"	1995	Unknown
4	"Stop the Music"	1995	Unknown
5	"Body Feels Exit"	1995	Masashi Mutō
6	"Chase the Chance"	1995	Norihiro Akita
7	"Don't Wanna Cry"	1996	Norihiro Akita
8	"You're My Sunshine"	1996	Shuichi Tan
9	"Sweet 19 Blues"	1996	Wataru Takeishi
10	"A Walk in the Park"	1996	Masashi Mutō
11	"Can You Celebrate?"	1997	Wataru Takeishi
12	"How to Be a Girl"	1997	Masashi Mutō
13	"Dreaming I Was Dreaming"	1997	Masashi Mutō
14	"I Have Never Seen"	1998	Masashi Mutō
15	"Respect the Power of Love"	1999	Masashi Mutō
16	"Something 'bout the Kiss"	1999	Masashi Mutō
17	"Love 2000"	2000	Masashi Mutō
18	"Never End"	2000	Masashi Mutō
19	"Please Smile Again"	2000	Masashi Mutō
20	"Think of Me"	2001	Masashi Mutō
21	"Say the Word"	2001	Masashi Mutō
22	"I Will"	2002	Masashi Mutō
23	"Wishing on the Same Star"	2002	Masashi Mutō
24	"Did U"	2002	Kim Chan
25	"Shine More"	2003	Ugichin
26	"Put 'Em Up"	2003	Ugichin
27	"So Crazy"	2003	Masashi Mutō
28	"Alarm"	2004	Ugichin
29	"All for You"	2004	Masashi Mutō
30	"Girl Talk"	2004	Ugichin
31	"The Speed Star"	2004	Ugichin
32	"Want Me, Want Me"	2005	Masashi Mutō
33	"WoWa"	2005	Masashi Mutō
34	"White Light"	2005	Masashi Mutō
35	"Can't Sleep, Can't Eat, I'm Sick"	2006	Masashi Mutō
36	"Ningyo"	2006	Masashi Mutō
37	"Baby Don't Cry"	2007	Masashi Mutō
38	"Funky Town"	2007	Uchino Masaaki
39	"Hide and Seek"	2007	Kensuke Kawamura
40	"Hello"	2007	Kensuke Kawamura
41	"New Look"	2008	Yūichi Kodama and Hidekazu Satō
42	"Rock Steady"	2008	Yūsuke Tanaka and Hidekazu Satō
43	"What a Feeling"	2008	Takeshi Nakamura and Hidekazu Satō
44	"Do Me More"	2008	Yūsuke Tanaka and Hidekazu Satō
45	"Sexy Girl"	2008	Kensuke Kawamura
46	"Wild"	2009	Caviar
47	"Dr."	2009	Junpei Mizusaki, Hidekazu Satō, and Yasuhiko Shimizu
48	"The Meaning of Us"	2009	Shigeaki Kubo
49	"Fast Car"	2009	Shigeaki Kubo
50	"Love Game"	2009	Shigeaki Kubo
51	"Defend Love"	2009	Tanakazoo
52	"Break It"	2010	Shigeaki Kubo
53	"Get Myself Back"	2010	Shigeaki Kubo
54	"Wonder Woman" (featuring Ai and Anna Tsuchiya)	2011	Hideaki Sunaga
55	"Make It Happen" (featuring After School)	2011	Shigeaki Kubo
56	"Unusual" (featuring Tomohisa Yamashita)	2011	Shigeaki Kubo
57	"#1" (featuring Kaname Kawabata)	2011	Kensuke Kawamura
58	"Naked"	2011	Kōsai Sekine
59	"Tempest"	2011	Kōsai Sekine
60	"Love Story"	2011	Kensuke Kawamura
61	"Go Round"	2012	Shigeaki Kubo
62	"Yeah-Oh!"	2012	Masaki Takehisa
63	"Only You"	2012	Thomas Kloss
64	"Hot Girls"	2012	Kazuaki Seki and Yuni Yoshida
65	"Let's Go"	2012	Kensuke Kawamura
66	"In the Spotlight (Tokyo)"	2012	Shigeaki Kubo
67	"Damage"	2012	Shigeaki Kubo
68	"Big Boys Cry"	2013	Nino
69	"Contrail"	2013	Nino
70	"Hands on Me"	2013	Nino
71	"Heaven"	2013	Nino
72	"Let Me Let You Go"	2013	Nino
73	"Alive"	2013	IKIOI
74	"Ballerina"	2013	YKBX
75	"Neonlight Lipstick"	2013	Naokazu Mitsuishi
76	"Tsuki"	2014	Naokazu Mitsuishi
77	"Four Seasons"	2014	YKBX
78	"Himawari"	2014	YKBX
79	"Can You Celebrate?" (featuring Taro Hakase)	2014	Kensuke Kawamura
80	"Sweet 19 Blues"	2014	Kanji Suto
81	"Brighter Day"	2014	Uchino Masaaki
82	"Sweet Kisses"	2014	Kanji Suto
83	"Birthday"	2015	Haruka Furuya
84	"Stranger"	2015	Daichi Yasuda
85	"Anything"	2015	Wataru Saito
86	"Fashionista"	2015	Daichi Yasuda
87	"Golden Touch"	2015	Masashi Kawamura
88	"B Who I Want 2 B" (featuring Hatsune Miku)	2015	YKBX
89	"Red Carpet"	2015	Hisashi Kikuchi
90	"Mint"	2016	Naokazu Mitsuishi
91	"Hero"	2016	YKBX
92	"Hero (NHK version)"	2016	Ryouhei Shingu
93	"Show Me What You've Got"	2016	Kanji Suto
94	"Dear Diary"	2016	Ryouhei Shingu
95	"Fighter"	2016	Hiroaki Higashi
96	"Just You and I"	2017	Satoshi Kuroda
97	"Showtime"	2017	YKBX
98	"Do It For Love"	2017	Takeshi Maruyama
99	"Christmas Wish"	2017	Kanji Suto
100	"How do you feel now?"	2017	Akihiro Tamura
101	"In Two"	2017	Hiroki Yokoyama
102	"Finally"	2017	Hiroki Yokoyama

==== As a collaborating artist ====
#	Title	Year	Director
1	"Lovin' It" (with Verbal)	2001	Masashi Mutō
2	"Do What U Gotta Do" (Zeebra featuring Ai, Namie Amuro, and Mummy-D)	2006	Kenji Sonoda
3	"Black Diamond" (with Double)	2008	Shigeaki Kubo
4	"Fake" (Ai featuring Namie Amuro)	2010	Ugichin
5	"Grotesque" (Ken Hirai featuring Namie Amuro)	2014	Nino
6	"I'm Not Yours" (Jolin Tsai featuring Namie Amuro)	2015	Muh Chen
7	"Revolution" (Crystal Kay featuring Namie Amuro)	2015	Suzuki Toshiyuki

=== Video games ===
List of video games
Title	Platform(s)	Game details
Digital Dance Mix Vol. 1 Namie Amuro	Sega Saturn	Released: 10 January 1997; Publisher: Sega; Players direct music videos for "Chase the Chance" or "You're My Sunshine" using a high-resolution digitized polygonal model of Namie Amuro and other graphic assets.
