= So Crazy Tour =

2003–2004 concert tour by Namie Amuro

- Tour by Namie Amuro
- Promotional poster for the Seoul concert.
- Location: Asia
- Associated album: Style
- Start date: November 29, 2003
- End date: May 15, 2004
- No. of shows: 34 in Japan; 2 in Taiwan; 3 in South Korea; 39 total

Namie Amuro concert chronology
- Break the Rules Tour (2001); So Crazy Tour (2003–2004); Space of Hip-Pop (2005)

The So Crazy Tour (officially the So Crazy Tour featuring Best Singles 2003-2004) was the fifth concert tour by Japanese recording artist Namie Amuro, in support of her sixth studio album Style (2003). The tour began on November 29, 2003 at the Nagarakawa International Convention Center in Gifu, Japan, and ended on May 15, 2004, at the Olympic Gymnastics Arena in Seoul, South Korea. While Amuro had previously held a one-off concert in Hawaii during the Genius 2000 Tour, the So Crazy Tour marked her first proper international tour, and several of her following tours would include shows in Asia. This was also her first and only time to tour South Korea.

== Background ==
Amuro's popularity and record sales plunged in 2002. After being told by her staff that an arena tour would not be viable, she decided to "climb back up from scratch" and perform in concert halls. In October 2003, alongside the release of her double A-side single "So Crazy/Come", the So Crazy Tour was announced to begin the following month. Media outlets reported that all of the concerts in Japan were sold-out immediately, therefore additional concerts were added.

The tour was billed as a "best singles" tour, and it included all of Amuro's solo singles up to that point, as well as one of the Suite Chic tracks. Due to this, only the singles from Style were performed during the show. In August 2004, Amuro would embark on a fan club tour entitled Fan Space '04 during which she performed album tracks from Style.

== International performances ==
In addition to 34 dates in Japan, she made her first-ever solo tour dates in Taiwan, which became a regular stop for her later international tours, and South Korea, in her only visit to the country. The Taipei concerts were promoted as So Crazy in Taipei and the Seoul concerts were promoted as So Crazy Tour in Seoul 2004. The international concerts were broadcast in their respective countries on national television, in which Amuro closed out her concerts with "Never End" partially sung in their local languages.

Amuro's performances in Seoul coincided with the lift of the import ban on Japanese pop culture products in South Korea in 2004. Her concerts were highly anticipated and received enthusiastic comments from local media. On the last date of the concert on May 15, Rain and F-iV joined Amuro as her opening acts. Part of the concert's profits were donated to the Korea National Council on Social Welfare, a foundation dedicated to saving children with pediatric cancer and leukemia. She was also recognized by the Asia Cultural Industry Exchange Foundation for her contributions to Japan-Korea cultural exchange.

== Set list ==
1. "Put 'Em Up" (includes excerpt from "Namie's Style")
2. "Shine More"
3. "Respect the Power of Love"
4. "I Have Never Seen"
5. Medley: "Something 'Bout the Kiss" / "No More Tears" / "Dreaming I Was Dreaming"
6. "Please Smile Again"
7. "I Will"
8. "Uh Uh,,,,,,"
9. "Toi et Moi"
10. "Wishing on the Same Star"
11. Medley: "Love 2000" / "How to Be a Girl" / "Chase the Chance"
12. "Think of Me"
13. "Sweet 19 Blues"
14. "So Crazy"
15. Band Introduction
16. "Body Feels Exit"
17. Dancer Introduction
18. "You're My Sunshine"
19. "A Walk in the Park"
20. "Say the Word"

Encore

21. "Can You Celebrate?"
22. "Don't Wanna Cry"
23. "Never End"

Notes

- Starting with the Maebashi concert on March 19, "Alarm" was added to the setlist.

== Tour dates ==
Tour dates
Date	City	Country	Venue	Attendance
November 29, 2003	Gifu	Japan	Nagaragawa Convention Center	120,000
November 30, 2003	Mie	Japan	Mie Cultural Hall	120,000
December 7, 2003	Utsunomiya	Japan	Utsunomiya Cultural Hall	120,000
December 11, 2003	Tokyo	Japan	Tokyo International Forum	120,000
December 12, 2003	Tokyo	Japan	Tokyo International Forum	120,000
December 14, 2003	Sendai	Japan	Sendai Sun Plaza	120,000
December 19, 2003	Nagano	Japan	Nagano Civic Cultural Hall	120,000
January 9, 2004	Nagoya	Japan	Nagoya Century Hall	120,000
January 10, 2004	Nagoya	Japan	Nagoya Century Hall	120,000
January 12, 2004	Hamamatsu	Japan	Act City Hamamatsu	120,000
January 15, 2004	Tokyo	Japan	Tokyo International Forum	120,000
January 16, 2004	Tokyo	Japan	Tokyo International Forum	120,000
January 24, 2004	Kobe	Japan	Kobe International Hall	120,000
January 25, 2004	Kobe	Japan	Kobe International Hall	120,000
January 30, 2004	Akita	Japan	Akita City Culture Hall	120,000
February 1, 2004	Morioka	Japan	Morioka Civic Cultural Hall	120,000
February 8, 2004	Ishikawa	Japan	Ishikawa Welfare Pension Hall	120,000
February 13, 2004	Kamakura	Japan	Kamakura Civic Hall	120,000
February 14, 2004	Hiroshima	Japan	Hiroshima Welfare Pension Hall	120,000
February 22, 2004	Sapporo	Japan	Hokkaido Welfare Pension Hall	120,000
February 27, 2004	Kagoshima	Japan	Kagoshima Civic Cultural Hall	120,000
February 29, 2004	Nagasaki	Japan	Nagasaki Brick Hall	120,000
March 4, 2004	Osaka	Japan	Grand Cube Osaka	120,000
March 5, 2004	Osaka	Japan	Grand Cube Osaka	120,000
March 7, 2004	Nagoya	Japan	Aichi Prefectural Art Theater	120,000
March 13, 2004	Niigata	Japan	Niigata Civic Hall	120,000
March 19, 2004	Maebashi	Japan	Gunma Civic Hall	120,000
March 21, 2004	Sendai	Japan	Sendai Sun Plaza	120,000
March 24, 2004	Kumamoto	Japan	Kumamoto Civic Hall	120,000
March 26, 2004	Fukuoka	Japan	Fukuoka Sun Palace	120,000
March 27, 2004	Fukuoka	Japan	Fukuoka Sun Palace	120,000
April 3, 2004	Osaka	Japan	Osaka Festival Hall	—
April 4, 2004	Osaka	Japan	Osaka Festival Hall	—
April 11, 2004	Tokyo	Japan	Tokyo International Forum	—
May 1, 2004	New Taipei City	Taiwan	Xinzhuang Gymnasium	12,000
May 2, 2004	New Taipei City	Taiwan	Xinzhuang Gymnasium	12,000
May 13, 2004	Seoul	South Korea	Olympic Gymnastics Arena	25,000
May 14, 2004	Seoul	South Korea	Olympic Gymnastics Arena	25,000
May 15, 2004	Seoul	South Korea	Olympic Gymnastics Arena	25,000
Total				157,000

== Live recordings and broadcast ==
So Crazy Tour Featuring Best Singles 2003–2004

Video by Namie Amuro
- Released: September 23, 2004
- Recorded: January 15-16, 2004
- Venue: Tokyo International Forum, Hall A
- Genre: Pop; R&B
- Label: Avex Trax
- Director: Ugichin

Namie Amuro chronology
Namie Amuro Tour 2001 Break The Rules (2003)	So Crazy Tour Featuring Best Singles 2003–2004 (2004)	Filmography 2001-2005 (2005)

The concert video, titled So Crazy Tour featuring Best Singles 2003–2004, was released on DVD on September 23, 2004. It peaked at number ten on the Oricon DVD chart, remaining on the chart for 66 weeks and selling 71,000 copies. In addition to the Taiwan and Korean broadcasts, a 2-hour special chronicling her January 16 concert at the Tokyo International Forum was aired by NHK BS2 on May 17, 2004.

=== Personnel ===
- Performer
  - Namie Amuro
- Choreographer
  - Warner
- Band
  - Ken Kawamura (keyboards)
  - Ken Kimura (guitar)
  - Kenji Sano (bass)
  - Mitsuru Kurauchi (drums)
- Dancers
  - Mayumi
  - Megumi
  - Nazuki
  - Rika
  - Ryo
  - Shige
  - Subaru
  - Tetsuharu

=== Charts ===
Chart	Peak position
Japan Weekly DVD Chart (Oricon)	10
