= Genius 2000 Tour =

2000 concert tour by Namie Amuro

- Tour by Namie Amuro
- Promotional poster for the Hawaii concert.
- Location: Japan; United States
- Associated album: Genius 2000
- Start date: March 20, 2000
- End date: May 14, 2000
- Legs: 2
- No. of shows: 19

Namie Amuro concert chronology
- Concentration 20 Tour (1997); Genius 2000 Tour (2000); Break the Rules Tour (2001)

The Genius 2000 Tour was the third concert tour by Japanese recording artist Namie Amuro, in support of her fourth studio album Genius 2000 (2000). The tour began on March 20, 2000 at the Makuhari Messe Event Hall in Chiba, Japan, and concluded on May 14, 2000 at the Waikiki Shell in Honolulu, Hawaii. This was Amuro's first tour in three years since the Concentration 20 Tour in 1997, and marked her return to touring after her maternity leave hiatus. The Hawaii concert, billed as Big Wave Honolulu, marked Amuro's first and only live performance outside of Asia.

== Background ==
Following her maternity leave hiatus, Amuro returned to the music industry in December 1998, with the release of her number-one single "I Have Never Seen" and her comeback appearance at the 49th NHK Kōhaku Uta Gassen in which she performed "Can You Celebrate?" and achieved the highest audience rating for a singer in the show's history. Following a series of personal struggles, including the death of her mother in 1999, Amuro finally released her fourth studio album Genius 2000 in January 2000. The album debuted at number one on the Oricon Albums Chart and was certified Platinum by the Recording Industry Association of Japan (RIAJ). To promote the album, Amuro toured arenas in Japan during the spring of 2000, beginning in Chiba on March 20 and ending with two concerts in Osaka on May 6 and 7.

=== Big Wave Honolulu ===
To commemorate the 100th anniversary of Okinawans moving to Hawaii, Amuro held a one-off concert at the Waikiki Shell in Honolulu, Hawaii, billed as Big Wave Honolulu, on May 14, 2000. The concert was promoted with posters of Amuro on shopping malls and hotels in Waikiki and in local newspapers. Part of the concert's profit was donated to the Hawaii United Okinawa Association. A day before the concert, Amuro held an event at the Okinawa Hawaii Center in Oʻahu, during which she donated a check to the organization and interacted with members of her fan club, "AmR". 250 members of the fan club were flown from Japan for the concert and were given prizes after participating in a trivia quiz about the singer.

== Set list ==
1. "Toi et Moi"
2. "How to Be a Girl"
3. "I Have Never Seen"
4. "Next to You"
5. "Still in Love"
6. "Respect the Power of Love"
7. "Sweet 19 Blues"
8. "Something 'Bout the Kiss"
9. "Leavin' for Las Vegas"
10. "Mi Corazon (Te' Amour)"
11. "You're My Sunshine"
12. "Body Feels Exit"
13. "Chase the Chance"
14. "Love 2000"

Encore

15. "Can You Celebrate?"
16. "A Walk in the Park"
17. "Don't Wanna Cry"
18. "You Are the One"

Notes

- During the Honolulu concert, Amuro performed "Taiyou no Season" during the encore.

== Tour dates ==
Tour dates
Date (2000)	City	Country	Venue	Attendance
March 20	Chiba	Japan	Makuhari Messe Event Hall	—
March 28	Sapporo	Japan	Tsukisamu Green Dome	—
March 29	Sapporo	Japan	Tsukisamu Green Dome	—
April 1	Nagoya	Japan	Nagoya Rainbow Hall	—
April 2	Nagoya	Japan	Nagoya Rainbow Hall	—
April 5	Hiroshima	Japan	Hiroshima Sun Plaza	—
April 6	Hiroshima	Japan	Hiroshima Sun Plaza	—
April 9	Nagano	Japan	M-Wave	—
April 15	Fukuoka	Japan	Marine Messe Fukuoka	—
April 16	Fukuoka	Japan	Marine Messe Fukuoka	—
April 22	Sendai	Japan	Kamei Arena Sendai	—
April 23	Sendai	Japan	Kamei Arena Sendai	—
April 28	Tokyo	Japan	Yoyogi National Stadium First Gymnasium	—
April 29	Tokyo	Japan	Yoyogi National Stadium First Gymnasium	—
May 2	Tokyo	Japan	Yoyogi National Stadium First Gymnasium	—
May 3	Tokyo	Japan	Yoyogi National Stadium First Gymnasium	—
May 6	Osaka	Japan	Osaka-jō Hall	30,000
May 7	Osaka	Japan	Osaka-jō Hall	30,000
May 14	Honolulu	United States	Waikiki Shell	6,000

== Live recordings ==
Namie Amuro Tour "Genius 2000"

Video by Namie Amuro
- Released: August 18, 2000
- Recorded: May 6-7, 2000
- Venue: Osaka-jō Hall
- Genre: Pop; R&B
- Label: Avex Trax

Namie Amuro chronology
181920 Films (1998)	Namie Amuro Tour "Genius 2000" (2000)	Filmography (2001)

The concert video, titled Namie Amuro Tour "Genius 2000", was released on DVD and VHS formats on August 18, 2000. This was Amuro's last concert tour to be commercially released on VHS. The DVD version was originally released in a jewel case, but was re-released in a snap case along with the videos for Amuro's first two concerts tours on March 24, 2005 at a reduced price. Namie Amuro Tour "Genius 2000" peaked at number 9 on the Oricon DVD chart and remained on the charts for 21 weeks.

=== Personnel ===
- Performer
  - Namie Amuro
- Music director
  - Kenji Sano
- Backing vocals
  - Lynn Mabry
  - Sheila E.
  - Will Wheaton Jr.
- Live band
  - Carlos Rios (guitar)
  - Jetro da Silva (keyboard)
  - Kiki Ebsen (keyboard)
  - Michael Paulo (saxophone)
  - Kenji Sano (bass)
- Music producer
  - Dallas Austin
  - Tetsuya Komuro
- Executive producer
  - Max Matsuura
  - Jonny Taira
  - Shinji Hayashi
  - Takashi Kasuga
  - Tom Yoda

=== Charts ===
Chart (2000)	Peak position
Japan Weekly DVD Chart (Oricon)	9
