= Break the Rules (album) =

- Regular digital cover

Studio album by Namie Amuro
- Released: December 20, 2000
- Recorded: 2000
- Studio: Record One (Los Angeles); TK's Malibu Studio (Los Angeles); TK Disc Studio Hawaii (Honolulu); DARP Studios (Atlanta); Enterprise Studios (Los Angeles); Baybridge Studio (Tokyo); The Record Plant (Los Angeles); Larrabee Sound Studios (Los Angeles); TK Disc Studio Japan; Skip Saylor Recording (Los Angeles); On Air Azabu Studio; The Hit Factory (New York City); Studio Guillaume Tell (Paris); Stanley House (London); Woodland Studios (Nashville)
- Genre: Pop
- Length: 63:03
- Label: Avex Trax
- Producer: Dallas Austin; Ricciano Lumpkins; Tetsuya Komuro

Namie Amuro chronology
Genius 2000 (2000)	Break the Rules (2000)	Love Enhanced Single Collection (2002)

Alternative cover
- Alternative cover

Singles from Break the Rules
- 1. "Never End" Released: July 12, 2000; 2. "Please Smile Again" Released: October 4, 2000; 3. "Think of Me / No More Tears" Released: January 24, 2001

Break the Rules is the fifth studio album by Japanese recording artist Namie Amuro, released on December 20, 2000, through Avex Trax. It was released only eleven months after her previous album Genius 2000 (2000). It is her final album working with her long-time producer Tetsuya Komuro, and features American producer Dallas Austin (who first worked on her previous record). The music style on Break the Rules is still based on American R&B, but the tunes are more lively than its predecessor.

Upon release, Break the Rules received positive reviews from music critics, who praised the production and Amuro's vocals throughout. The album was not a commercial success and failed to win first place on the weekly charts for the first time in her career. Break the Rules debuted at number two on the Oricon Albums Chart with first-week sales of over 157,000 copies. In doing so, it became Amuro's lowest-peaking and lowest-selling record in Japan to that point. Only around 335,000 copies were sold by the end of its chart run, less than half of her previous album. Despite this, Break the Rules was certified platinum by the Recording Industry Association of Japan (RIAJ).

"Never End" was released as the album's lead single on July 12, 2000, and served as the image song for the 26th G8 summit. The single became a success, peaking at number two on the Oricon Singles Chart and being certified double platinum by the RIAJ. "Please Smile Again" was released as the album's second single on October 4, 2000; it peaked at number two and was certified gold. "Think of Me / No More Tears" was released as a double A-side single on January 24, 2001; it only peaked at number seven on the chart. Amuro promoted Break the Rules by embarking on the Namie Amuro Tour 2001 Break the Rules concert tour from March to May 2001.

== Background and production ==
During the recording sessions for Genius 2000 (2000), Tetsuya Komuro approached American producer Dallas Austin about collaborating with him and Amuro's team on new music. He accepted the invitation and submitted demo recordings to Komuro. Amuro was excited about the opportunity to work with Austin because she had admired his work with the American girl group TLC, which had inspired her at the time. After the success of Genius 2000, Amuro decided to work with Austin again on its follow-up.

Break the Rules is her second album to feature songs written and produced by American music producer Dallas Austin. His role in this album, however, is much smaller than the last; for Genius 2000, Austin produced half of the album; with this album he only produced four songs. The majority of the tracks features compositions from Amuro's main producer, Tetsuya Komuro. The album was recorded at multiple studios across Japan, Europe and North America throughout 2000, and was mastered by Chris Bellman at Bernie Grundman Mastering.

== Composition ==
Komuro added “Rule 8AM” and “Rule 8PM” to show that a single day is filled with countless rules and structures we all live inside. By placing these “rule” tracks at the start and end of the album, he wanted to frame the whole project around the idea of daily constraints — and then show Amuro breaking out of them through the music. "Rule 8AM" is an opening skit suggesting a conversation taking place while shopping somewhere in a foreign country. "No More Tears" is built around a smooth, mid‑tempo Jpop/R&B arrangement with soft synths, steady rhythmic pulses, and layered harmonies. "Better Days" is a psychedelic pop song. The album's title track kicks off with a hard, bassy rhythm in the intro. Looking for You" is a disco song sung entirely in English. "Please Smile Again" is an energetic dance rock number. "Never Shoulda" is a classic R&B number with a deep, resonant beat.

"Cross Over" blends a light, mid‑tempo pop‑R&B groove with airy synths, a steady beat, and smooth layered vocals that give the track a sleek, modern feel within the album’s American‑influenced sound; the song also contains a rap verse from Poppa LQ. "Girlfriend" is a laid-back dance tune that has been favorably compared to the works of Jennifer Lopez. "Never End" is a grandiose pop ballad that takes influences from Okinawan music. "Think of Me" is a slow, R&B‑styled ballad built on soft keys, a steady beat, and layered harmonies, giving Amuro space to stretch into higher, more melismatic vocal lines. "Rule 8PM" is an interlude that features a conversation overheard while shopping, serving as a counterpart to the album's opening track. "Himawari" is a bright, mid‑tempo pop track built around warm synths, a gentle rhythmic pulse, and a melodic, uplifting vocal line that gives the song a light, sunlit atmosphere. The album is capped off by a disco remix "No More Tears" by Junior Vasquez.

== Title and artwork ==
"‘Break the Rules’ doesn’t mean something delinquent or rebellious. That’s not the image at all. When you look at the path Namie has walked, it’s something almost no one else has experienced — she’s a completely unique type of artist. That’s why, when she sings something like ‘You don’t have to follow the rules,’ it has real persuasive power."

— Komuro on why the album is named Break the Rules.

The album is called Break the Rules because Tetsuya Komuro felt Amuro had lived a completely unique career path, so when she sings about not being bound by rules, it carries real authority. He also wanted to show that people live surrounded by countless “rules” every day, and this album expresses her breaking out of fixed expectations — especially the idea that she should only make one kind of music.

Shoji Uchida shot the album artwork and photoshoot; the album cover is a close-up of Amuro set against a twilight sky with palm‑tree silhouettes. The booklet was presented as a foldout poster featuring Amuro looking out of an airplane window. It also came with a foldout card of photos depicting Namie in different locations around America, mostly New York City and Los Angeles. The album was housed in a transparent slip case with the phrase "break the rules" in pink running diagonally across the front and back of it.

== Promotion ==
=== Singles ===
Three singles were released to support Break the Rules. The album's lead single, "Never End," was released on July 12, 2000. The song was made specifically for the 26th G8 summit that took place in Amuro's home prefecture Okinawa during July of that year. The single was a commercial success, peaking at the second position on the Oricon Singles Chart and being certified double platinum by the Recording Industry Association of Japan (RIAJ) for nationwide sales of over 600,000 copies. The music video for "Never End," which was directed by Masashi Mutō, was filmed at Lake Nukabira and Tawa Breeding Farm in Shibecha, Hokkaido.

"Please Smile Again" was released as the album's second single on October 4, 2000. The song was used in commercials for Meiji Fran products. The B-side "Cross Over" was used as the Tu-Ka Phone commercial song. "Please Smile Again" was another commercial success for Amuro, peaking at number two and being certified gold for 200,000 copies shipped to stores. The song's music video was directed by Masashi Mutō.

The songs "Think of Me" and "No More Tears" were released as a double A-side single shortly after the release of the album. "Think of Me" was used as the Meiji Confectionary Fran commercial song while "No More Tears" was used as Kosé Cosmetics Luminous commercial song. A video directed by Masashi Mutō was made for "Think of Me" in New York during photo sessions for the album artwork. No video was made for "No More Tears." The single peaked at number seven on the Oricon Singles Chart, making it her lowest charting single at that point.

=== Live appearances and tours ===
Break the Rules Tour
- Tour by Namie Amuro
- Associated album: Break the Rules
- Start date: March 18, 2001
- End date: May 27, 2001
- No. of shows: 17

Namie Amuro concert chronology
- Genius 2000 Tour (2000); Break the Rules Tour (2001); So Crazy Tour (2003-2004)

On January 1, 2001, Amuro performed at the Rendez-Vous in Space concert in Okinawa, which was a concert organized by Jean-Michel Jarre and Tetsuya Komuro as a tribute to science fiction author Arthur C. Clarke. Amuro performed 4 songs, including "No More Tears" and "Never End" from the album. The performance of "No More Tears" was broadcast on TV. In July, Amuro performed at the Music Fest Peace of Ryukyu, which was a music festival held in Okinawa in commemoration of the anniversary of the 26th G8 summit and as a means to promote tourism to the region.

In March 2001, Amuro embarked on her fourth concert tour in support of the album. The Break the Rules Tour spanned 17 dates and 8 cities and venues, beginning on March 18 at the Makuhari Messe in Chiba and concluding with four concerts in Tokyo, at the Yoyogi National Stadium First Gymnasium, with the last show held on May 27, 2001. This would be Amuro's last arena tour until Live Style 2006, 5 years later.

The final Tokyo concert was recorded and released as a DVD, entitled Namie Amuro Tour 2001 Break the Rules, on November 19, 2003. A fan club limited edition of the DVD was released a year earlier in 2002, which included the performances of the "Try Me (Watashi o Shinjite)"/"Taiyou no Season" medley and "HimAWArI" that were omitted from the standard edition, as well as two bonus music videos. The release peaked at number 41 on the Oricon charts, and charted for 15 weeks.

Additionally, from October to November 2001, Amuro performed a series of concerts at nightclubs in Japan which were only open to members of her fan club. Named the "AmR" Tour '01, after her fan club "AmR" (Amuro Music Ring), it featured performances of songs from Break the Rules and her previous album, Genius 2000, as well as other lesser-known songs from her catalog and cover songs from different artists.

Break the Rules Tour set list
1. "Break the Rules"
2. "Love 2000"
3. "Never Shoulda"
4. "Better Days"
5. "Looking for You"
6. "Something 'Bout the Kiss"
7. "Can You Celebrate?"
8. Medley: "Try Me (Watashi o Shinjite)"/"Taiyou no Season"
9. "You're My Sunshine"
10. Band Introduction
11. "No More Tears"
12. "Respect the Power of Love"
13. "Cross Over"
14. "Please Smile Again"
15. "Don't Wanna Cry"
16. "Think of Me"

Encore

17. "Body Feels Exit" (Latin House Mix)
18. "Chase the Chance"
19. "Never End"
20. "No More Tears" (Junior Vasquez Mix)
21. "HimAWArI" (Tokyo dates only)
"AmR" Tour '01 set list
1. "Let's Do the Motion"
2. "I Have Never Seen"
3. "Let's Not Fight"
4. "I to You"
5. "Say the Word"
6. "Come Back to Me" (M-Flo cover)
7. "Kettobase!" (Hikaru Utada cover)
8. "Is This Love" (Earth cover)
9. "Asking Why" (Acoustic version)
10. "Things I Collected" (Acoustic version)
11. "Respect the Power of Love" (Funk version)
12. "Next to You"
13. "Better Days" (2-Step version)

Encore

14. "I'll Jump" (House Mix)
15. "Say the Word" (Breeze House Mix)

== Reception ==
Professional ratings
Review scores
Source	Rating
AllMusic	3.5/5 stars
MTVChinese.com	3.5/5 stars

Break the Rules received positive reviews from music critics. Ted Mills from AllMusic gave the album a score of three and a half stars out of five, calling Break the Rules a surprisingly strong pop album that benefits from lowered expectations and gives Namie Amuro room to evolve. He praises Dallas Austin’s R&B‑styled production for fitting her voice well without forcing it, aside from one misstep. Several tracks stand out to him as highlights, including “Better Days,” “Never Shoulda,” and “No More Tears,” though he concludes that the album still feels like an early test run for a larger international push.

Afternoon Tea from MTVChinese.com also gave the album a score of three and a hald stars, stating Break the Rules continues Amuro’s American‑leaning sound and shows clear vocal growth, especially on tracks like “No More Tears.” Despite strong performances and solid production from both Komuro and Dallas Austin, the album sold far worse than expected, partly because its hit single “Never End” didn’t match the album’s overall style. Musically, though, the reviewer considers it a worthwhile listen that reveals several different sides of Amuro. In 2000, the album track “Never End” received the **Millennium Special Award** at the 33rd All Japan Cable Broadcasting Awards and the **Special Award** at the 42nd Japan Record Awards.

Break the Rules debuted at number two on the Oricon Albums Chart by selling 157,850 copies in its first week. This was only a fraction of its predecessor Genius 2000, which sold 536,940 copies in its opening week earlier in the year in January. It became Amuro's lowest sales and chart debut for a studio set, until it was surpassed by her 2003 album Style. In its second week on the chart, Break the Rules fell to number ten, selling 113,850 copies. Break the Rules stayed in the top ten for only two weeks and in the top 300 chart for nine weeks. It was named the 69th best-selling album of 2001, with 334,520 copies sold by the end of the year. The album was certified platinum by the Recording Industry Association of Japan (RIAJ) in February 2001. According to Oricon Style, Break the Rules is Amuro's sixteenth best-selling album overall.

== Track listing ==
No.	Title	Lyrics	Music	Arranger(s)	Length
1.	"Rule 8AM"			Tetsuya Komuro	0:30
2.	"No More Tears"	Tetsuya Komuro	Tetsuya Komuro	Tetsuya Komuro	5:45
3.	"Better Days"	Gary White	Dallas Austin, Ricciano Lumpkins	Dallas Austin, Ricciano Lumpkins	4:22
4.	"Break the Rules"	Tetsuya Komuro	Tetsuya Komuro	Tetsuya Komuro	4:01
5.	"Looking for You"	Tetsuya Komuro	Tetsuya Komuro	Tetsuya Komuro	4:37
6.	"Please Smile Again"	Tetsuya Komuro	Tetsuya Komuro	Tetsuya Komuro	4:43
7.	"Never Shoulda"	Dallas Austin, Jasper Cameron	Dallas Austin	Dallas Austin	4:21
8.	"Cross Over (feat. Poppa LQ)"	Tetsuya Komuro	Tetsuya Komuro	Tetsuya Komuro	5:02
9.	"Girlfriend"	Dallas Austin, Debra Killings	Dallas Austin	Dallas Austin	4:13
10.	"Never End"	Tetsuya Komuro	Tetsuya Komuro	Tetsuya Komuro	6:26
11.	"Think of Me"	Dallas Austin	Dallas Austin	Dallas Austin	4:46
12.	"Rule 8PM"			Tetsuya Komuro	0:33
13.	"HimAWArI"	Tetsuya Komuro	Tetsuya Komuro	Tetsuya Komuro	4:45
14.	"No More Tears (Remix)"	Tetsuya Komuro	Tetsuya Komuro	Dave Darlington, Junior Vasquez, Gomi	8:59

== Personnel ==
- Namie Amuro – vocals, background vocals
- Poppa L.Q. – vocals
- Terry Bradford – background vocals
- Alex Brown – background vocals
- Andy Caine – background vocals
- Jennifer Carr – background vocals
- Debra Killings – background vocals
- Maxayn Lewis – background vocals
- Oleatha "Butta" Richie – background vocals
- Juliet Roberts – background vocals
- Will Wheaton Jr. – background vocals
- Ken Kimura – guitar
- Tetsuya Komuro – acoustic piano, keyboards, synthesizer
- Kazuhiro Matsuo – acoustic guitar

Production

- Producers – Dallas Austin, Ricciano Lumpkins, Tetsuya Komuro
- Arrangement – Dallas Austin, Tetsuya Komuro
- Mixing – Dave Darlington, Kevin "KD" Davis, Chris Puram, Alvin Seights
- Midi & Sound Design – Rick Sheppard
- Vocal Direction – Kenji Sano
- Remixing – Junior Vasquez (No More Tears Remix)
- Photography – Shoji Uchida
- Art Direction – Tycoon Graphics

== Charts ==
=== Weekly charts ===
Chart (2000–2001)	Peak position
Japanese Albums (Oricon)	2

=== Monthly charts ===
Chart (2001)	Peak position
Japanese Albums (Oricon)	7

=== Year-end charts ===
Chart (2001)	Position
Japanese Albums (Oricon)	69

== Sales and certifications ==
Region	Certification	Certified units/sales
Japan (RIAJ)	Platinum	334,520
