= Love Enhanced Single Collection =

Greatest hits album by Namie Amuro
- Released: March 13, 2002
- Recorded: 1999–2002
- Genre: Pop; dance
- Length: 62:11
- Label: Avex Trax
- Producer: Dallas Austin; Tetsuya Komuro; Thomas Johansson; Ronald Malmberg

Namie Amuro chronology
Break the Rules (2000)	Love Enhanced Single Collection (2002)	Style (2003)

Singles from Love Enhanced Single Collection
- 1. "Say the Word" Released: August 8, 2001; 2. "I Will" Released: February 14, 2002

Love Enhanced Single Collection (stylized as LOVE ENHANCED ♥ single collection) is the second greatest hits album by Japanese singer Namie Amuro. It was released on March 13, 2002, through Avex Trax. This was Amuro's first greatest hits album in about four years, since 181920. It was also her first greatest hits album since her return to the music scene. Although the album is labeled as a "singles collection," nearly all of the songs on the album have been re-recorded, re-mixed, or re-arranged, all of which remain exclusive to this album's release. In addition, only "Lovin' It" was recorded as a single take. The album also contains the last of the work she created with her longtime creative partner Tetsuya Komuro.

Commercially, Love Enhanced Single Collection was only moderately successful. The album peaked at number three on the Oricon Albums Chart and sold over 300,000 copies nationwide, receiving a platinum certification from the Recording Industry Association of Japan (RIAJ). However, its sales were only a fraction of its predecessor 181920, which went on to sell more than two million copies nationwide. Amuro ultimately decided to not embark on a concert tour to promote the album.

== Background ==
"I was consulting with all the staff and we were looking for a word with the nuance of "more" or "power up"; I found the word "ENHANCED." However, that alone felt too stiff, so I wanted a title that felt broader and softer, and that's why I added "LOVE."

—Amuro explaining the origin of the title Love Enhanced Single Collection.

Amuro's second compilation is different from her first in that the majority of the album features new versions of previous singles. Amuro and her staff had originally talked about releasing an original album around this time. However, they wanted to take a little more time to create an original album, and Amuro's first greatest hits album was just a collection of singles, so her staff thought it would be good to rework the singles and make them into a past album. The only song that wasn't reworked is the track "Lovin' It (Namie Amuro & Verbal)." The initial track list of the album included the song "Put 'Em Up feat. Chili from TLC". However, the song was scrapped from the album and was ultimately released as its own single in 2003. "HimAWArI" is the only song on the album to be included that was not a single. Amuro explained that during the original recording of the song for the Break the Rules album she was sick, so she wanted to record a new version since it had become a fan favorite.

The album also contains the last of the work she created with Tetsuya Komuro; the producer who wrote all her previous material. Love Enhanced Single Collection in itself is a turning point for Amuro. After this album she retooled her image, took creative control of her career and made strides to be accepted as an R&B vocalist. On January 28, 2004, a DVD-Audio version of the album was released.

== Singles ==
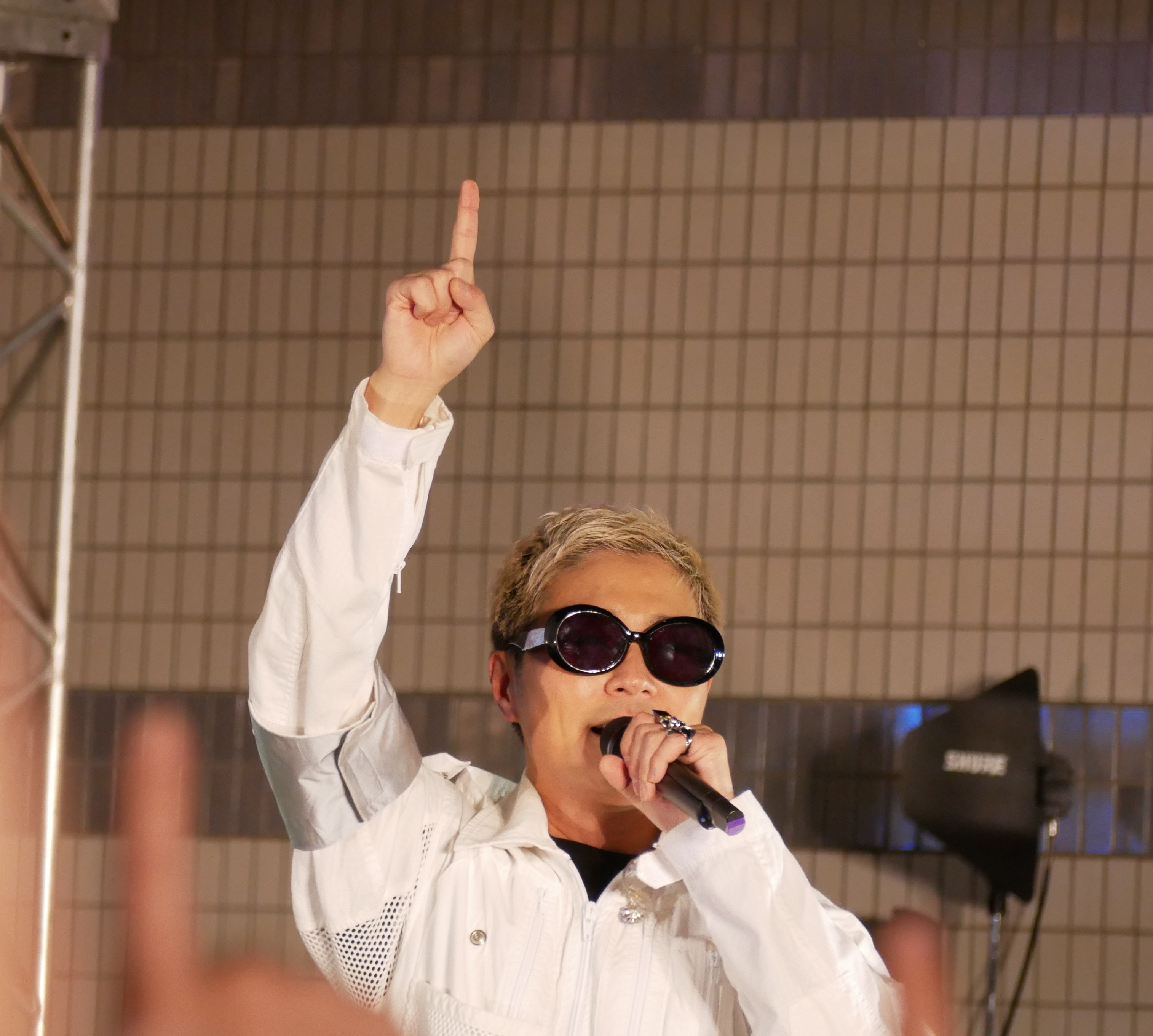
The charity single "Lovin' It" was a collaboration with rapper Verbal (pictured) from M-Flo

Three singles were released to promote Love Enhanced Single Collection. The first was "Say the Word" in August 2001. The single was a great success, peaking in the top three of the Oricon Singles Chart, and has since been certified gold by the Recording Industry Association of Japan (RIAJ) for shipments of over 100,000 copies. This was Amuro's first single to be released since severing ties with her former long-time producer Tetsuya Komuro in January 2001 after the release of "Think of Me/No More Tears." During the promoting for the single it was highlighted that this was Amuro's first single to have self written lyrics, with the lyrics being dedicated to her son, Haruto. However, Malmberg and Johansson previously sold the track to Danish artist Jeanett Debb and it was included on her album Virtualize, which was released in January 2001. Even though the lyrics are credited solely to Amuro, it shares English lines from Debb's version of the song. Amuro went on to perform "Say the Word" at the 52nd NHK Kohaku Uta Gassen as a part of the Red team, marking her seventh consecutive appearance at the prestigious event.

Four months later in December 2001 she released the collaboration single "Lovin' It" with rapper Verbal. It is the third single from the charity project "song+nation" (described as "songnation" in some places) launched by Tetsuya Komuro and Max Matsuura in response to the September 11 attacks in the United States. Despite splitting from Komuro earlier in the year, Amuro decided to work with Komuro for one last time on the song. "Lovin' It" peaked at number eight on the Oricon Singles Chart, and was certified gold by the RIAJ.

The last single off the album, "I Will," was released on Valentine's Day 2002. The single became Amuro's first solo single to sell less than 100,000 copies, failing to receive a certification from the RIAJ. "I Will" peaked at number seven on the Oricon Singles Chart. The lyrics are written by Amuro herself, as with her previous solo single, and the song is a message to her fans.

== Commercial performance ==
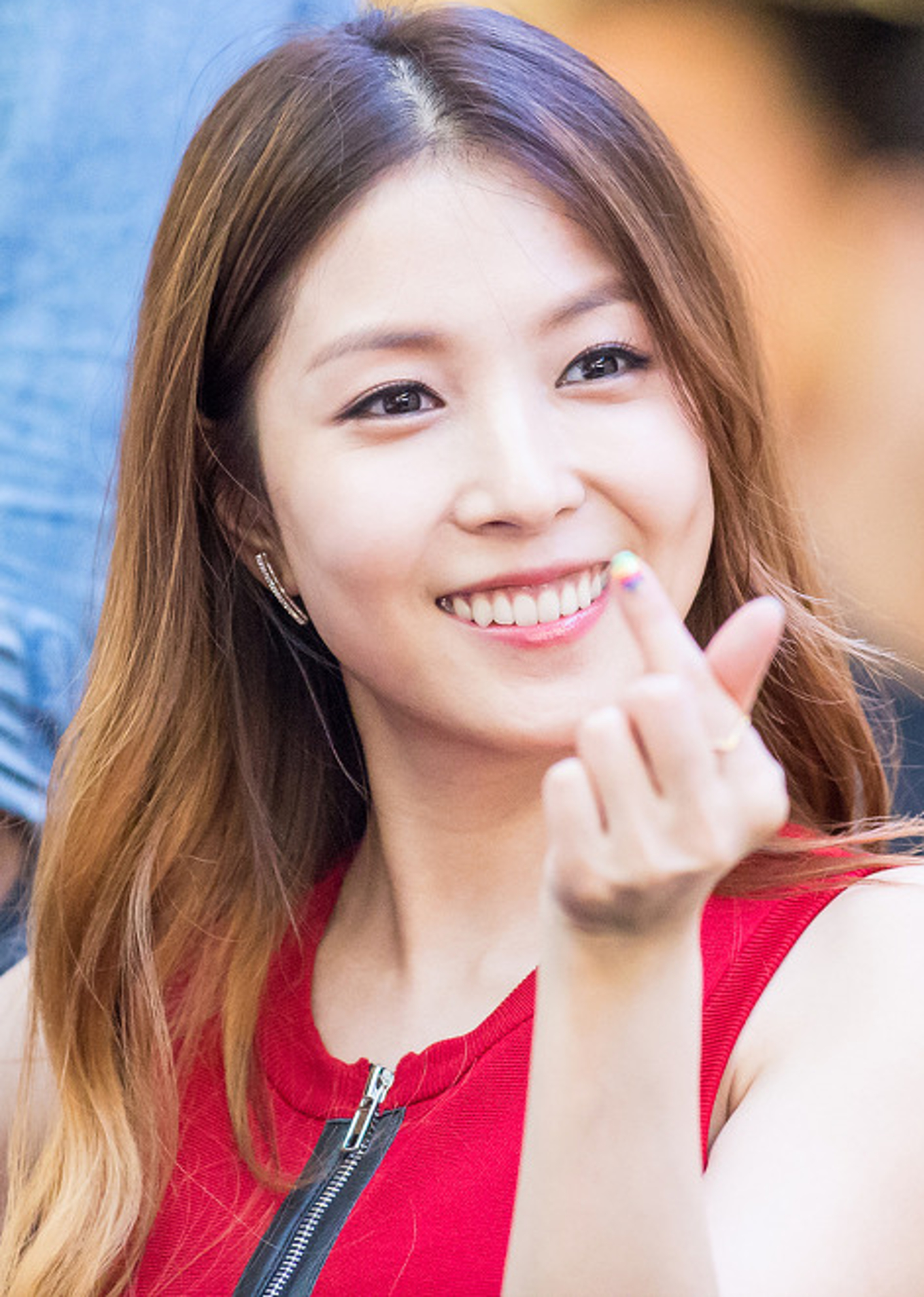
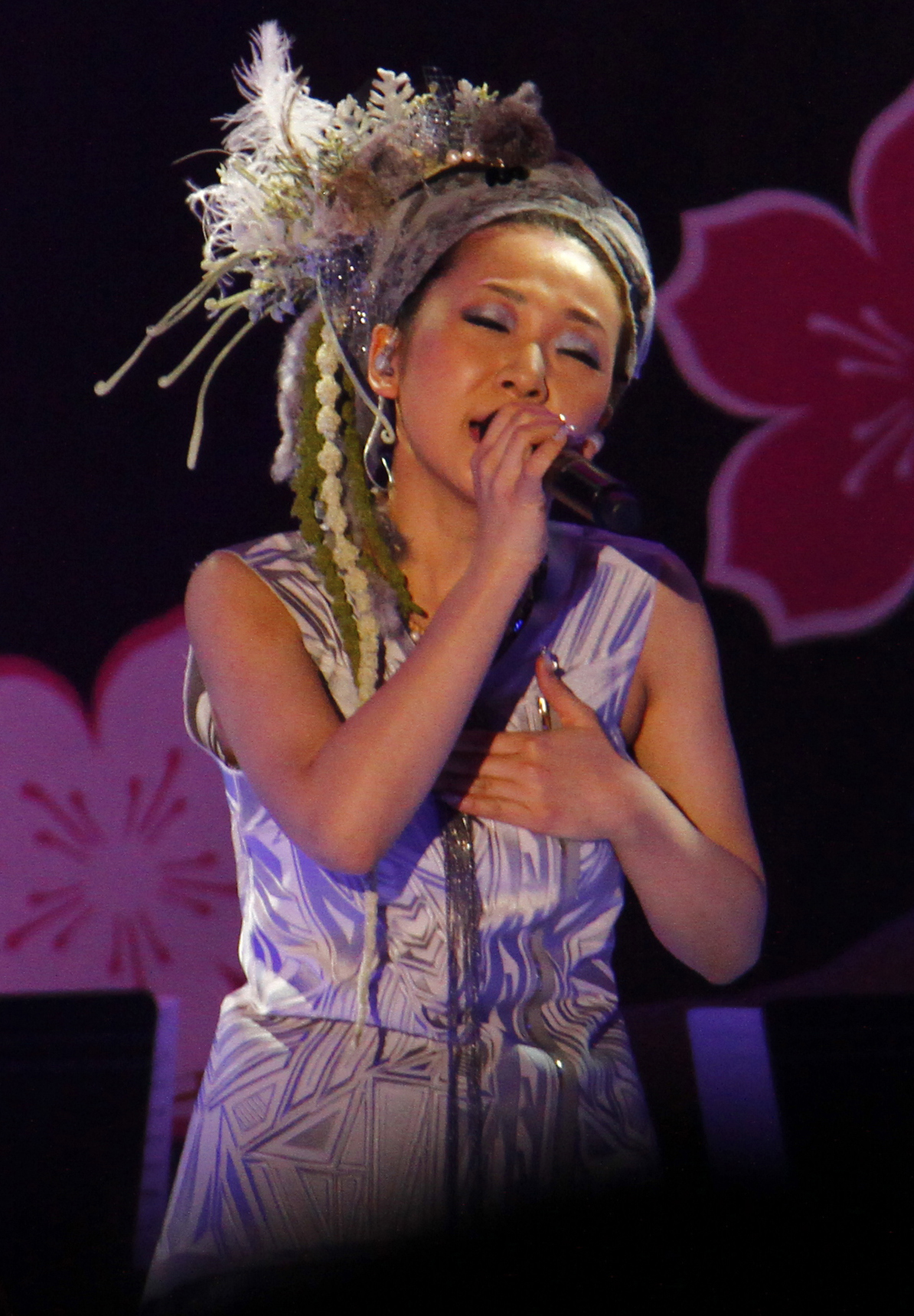
Love Enhanced Single Collection was blocked from reaching the number one spot on the Oricon Albums Chart by BoA's Listen to My Heart (left) and Misia's Misia Greatest Hits (right).

In Japan, Love Enhanced Single Collection debuted at number three on the Oricon Albums Chart with 158,680 copies sold in its first week, being blocked from the top spot by BoA's Listen to My Heart and Misia's Misia Greatest Hits. The opening week sales for Love Enhanced Single Collection were only a pittance of its predecessor 181920, which sold 857,100 copies in its opening week back in 1998. Love Enhanced Single Collection descended to number seven on the albums chart on its second week of availability, shifting 61,910 units. On its third week, the album plummeted to number fifteen on the chart, shifting 34,390 units. The album then slid to number eighteen on the chart, selling 17,840 units, before dropping out of the top twenty entirely the following week.

The underwhelming performance of the album's inaugural sales was attributed to Amuro's popularity and personal life at the time being in freefall, which caused her to be hounded by the media. At this time, Amuro was dealing with declining popularity among the rise of other Japanese singers, such as Hikaru Utada and labelmate Ayumi Hamasaki, and her much-publicized personal troubles, such as her recent divorce from professional dancer Masaharu "Sam" Maruyama and losing custody of her son. In all, Love Enhanced Single Collection stayed in the top 300 chart for a total of ten weeks. It sold 305,040 copies by the end of the fiscal year, becoming the 62nd best-selling album of 2002 in Japan. The album was certified platinum by the Recording Industry Association of Japan (RIAJ) in March 2002. According to Oricon Style, Love Enhanced Single Collection is Amuro's seventeenth best-selling album overall.

== Track listing ==
No.	Title	Lyrics	Music	Arrangement	Length
1.	"Say the word (new arrangement)"	Namie Amuro	Ronald Malmberg; Thomas Johansson	Kazuhiro Hara; Keiichi Ueno	3:52
2.	"RESPECT the POWER OF LOVE (new mix)"	Tetsuya Komuro	Tetsuya Komuro	Tetsuya Komuro	5:12
3.	"NEVER END (new vocal)"	Tetsuya Komuro	Tetsuya Komuro	Tetsuya Komuro	6:05
4.	"LOVE 2000 (new mix)"	Tetsuya Komuro; Sheila E.; Lynn Mabry; Takahiro Maeda	Tetsuya Komuro; Sheila E.; Lynn Mabry	Tetsuya Komuro; Sheila E.; Lynn Mabry	5:01
5.	"PLEASE SMILE AGAIN (new mix)"	Tetsuya Komuro	Tetsuya Komuro	Keiichi Ueno	4:43
6.	"think of me (new vocal)"	Dallas Austin	Dallas Austin	Dallas Austin	4:25
7.	"SOMETHING 'BOUT THE KISS (new vocal)"	Dallas Austin; Lysette Titi; Chan Hai	Dallas Austin	Dallas Austin	4:44
8.	"lovin' it"	Tetsuya Komuro, Verbal	Tetsuya Komuro	Tetsuya Komuro	5:00
9.	"I HAVE NEVER SEEN (new vocal & arrangement)"	Tetsuya Komuro	Tetsuya Komuro	Keiichi Ueno	5:37
10.	"HimAWArI (new vocal)"	Tetsuya Komuro	Tetsuya Komuro	Tetsuya Komuro	4:45
11.	"no more tears (new mix)"	Tetsuya Komuro	Tetsuya Komuro	Tetsuya Komuro	5:45
12.	"I WILL (new mix)"	Namie Amuro	Takusuke Hayama	Takusuke Hayama	6:41
Total length:					62:11

== Personnel ==
Performers and musicians

- Namie Amuro – vocals, background vocals
- Verbal – vocals
- Terry Bradford – background vocals
- Andy Caine – background vocals
- Jennifer Carr – background vocals
- Sheila E. – background vocals, percussion, drums
- Debra Killings – background vocals
- Ken Kimura – guitar
- Tetsuya Komuro – acoustic piano, keyboard, synthesizer
- Lynn Mabry – background vocals
- Maruyama Strings Group – strings
- Kazuhiro Matsuo – acoustic guitar
- Renato Neto – keyboard
- Juliet Roberts – background vocals
- Michael Thompson – guitar
- Will Wheaton Jr. – background vocals

Technical

- Producers - Dallas Austin, Tetsuya Komuro, Ronald Melmberg, Thomas Johansson
- Vocal Direction - Yuko Kawai, Kenji Sano
- Remixing - Kevin "KD" Davis, Eddie Delena, Dave Ford, Jon Gass, Eiji Isomura, Manny Maloquin, Chris Puram
- Midi & Sound Design - Rick Sheppard
- Photography - Shoji Uchida
- Art Direction: TYG

== Charts ==
=== Weekly charts ===
Chart (2002)	Peak position
Japanese Albums (Oricon)	3

=== Year-end charts ===
Chart (2002)	Position
Japanese Albums (Oricon)	62

== Sales and certifications ==
Region	Certification	Certified units/sales
Japan (RIAJ)	Platinum	305,284
