= I Will (Namie Amuro song) =

Single by Namie Amuro

from the album Love Enhanced Single Collection
- Released: February 14, 2002
- Length: 26:14
- Label: Avex Trax
- Songwriter(s): Namie Amuro, Hiroaki Hayama
- Producer(s): Hiroaki Hayama

Namie Amuro singles chronology
"Say the Word" (2001)	"I Will" (2002)	"Wishing on the Same Star" (2002)

"I Will" is Namie Amuro's 20th solo single under the Avex Trax label and is her second lyrical composition. Atypical of Amuro, "I Will" is an orchestral ballad. Released on Valentine's Day, it is her first single as a solo artist to not sell at least 100,000 copies.

== Track listing ==
1. "I Will" (Namie Amuro, Hiroaki Hayama) – 6:43
2. "I Will in L.A." (Namie Amuro, Hiroaki Hayama) – 6:43
3. "I Will with piano" (Namie Amuro, Hiroaki Hayama) – 6:07
4. "I Will not sing" (Hiroaki Hayama) – 6:41

== Personnel ==
- Namie Amuro – vocals, background vocals
- Will Wheaton – Chorus
- Terry Bradford – Chorus
- Maxayn Lews – Chorus
- Alex Brown – Chorus
- Bill Cantos – Piano
- Maruyama Strings Group – Strings

== Production ==
- Producers – Hiroaki Hayama
- Arrangement – Hiroaki Hayama
- Chorus Arrangement – Kenji Sano
- Strings Arrangement – Tatsuya Murayama
- Mixing – Dave Ford, Jon Gass
- Vocal Direction – Kenji Sano
- Music Video Director – Masashi Muto

== TV performances ==
- February 15, 2002 – Music Station
- February 16, 2002 – Pop Jam
- February 18, 2002 – Hey! Hey! Hey! Music Champ Special
- February 19, 2002 – AX Music Factory
- February 24, 2002 – CDTV
- April 1, 2002 – Hey! Hey! Hey! Music Champ Music Awards VI
- April 5, 2002 – Music Station Special

== Charts ==
Oricon Sales Chart (Japan)

Release	Chart	Peak position	Sales total
September 11, 2003	Oricon Weekly Singles Chart	7	95,120
