= Genius 2000 =

- Standard cover. The original cover features a blue background.

Studio album by Namie Amuro
- Released: January 26, 2000
- Recorded: 1998–1999
- Studios: Audio Resource; Baybridge Studio; Darp Studios; The Hit Factory; Larrabee West; Record One; Record Plant Studios; Sony Music Studios; True Kiss Disc; TK's Malibu Studio; Transcontinental Studios; Village Recorders; Yamaha Epicurus Studio
- Genres: Pop; electronica; R&B
- Length: 66:00
- Label: Avex Trax
- Producers: Dallas Austin; Tetsuya Komuro

Namie Amuro chronology
181920 (1998)	Genius 2000 (2000)	Break the Rules (2000)

Singles from Genius 2000
- 1. "I Have Never Seen" Released: December 23, 1998; 2. "Respect the Power of Love" Released: March 17, 1999; 3. "Something 'Bout the Kiss" Released: September 1, 1999; 4. "Love 2000" Released: January 1, 2000

Genius 2000 is the fourth studio album by Japanese recording artist Namie Amuro, released on January 26, 2000, through Avex Trax. The album was released three years after her last album, Concentration 20 (1997), and was produced by Tetsuya Komuro and Dallas Austin, marking her first collaboration with an American producer, the album spawned four singles: "I Have Never Seen", "Respect the Power of Love", "Something 'Bout the Kiss" and "Love 2000".

Upon its release, Genius 2000 debuted at number one on the Oricon Weekly Albums Chart with 536,000 copies sold. It became her fourth studio album and fifth overall to top the chart, but had the lowest first week sales of her career at the time. The album has sold over 800,000 copies and has been certified 2× Platinum by the RIAJ in February 2000. Only 11 months after the album's release, Amuro released her fifth studio album, Break the Rules.

== Singles and tie-ins ==
"People say, 'Wow,' but at first I had no idea who he was. So when they told me, I was like, 'Oh, I see.' Mr. Komuro did his best to build a bridge between us. But I gradually realized that he is an amazing person who has produced my favorite artists like TLC, Madonna, Michael Jackson, Monica, and many others. ......"

— Amuro talking about working with Dallas Austin.

The album's first single, "I Have Never Seen", was released 13 months before the album, on December 23, 1998. The single marked her return to the entertainment industry following her maternity leave and was her last number one single until 60s 70s 80s almost 10 years later. The second single, "Respect the Power of Love", was released on the same day that Amuro's mother was murdered, causing the singer to cancel promotion for the single. "Something 'Bout the Kiss", produced by Dallas Austin, was released in September and was Amuro's first single to be produced by Austin. The final single, "Love 2000", was released on New Year's Day in 2000, preceding the album by three weeks.

The album contains the songs which Komuro produced with American musicians, and the songs which Dallas Austin produced. Musically, it shows that Amuro's interest shifted towards hip-hop and R&B. It also features a duet with American boy band Imajin, titled "You Are the One". The song "Things I Collected" would be covered by Tamia for the soundtrack of Diary of a Mad Black Woman. Tamia's version of the song omits the acoustic guitar solo, but otherwise is identical to Namie's version.

== Promotion and live performances ==
Amuro embarked on the Genius 2000 Tour in promotion of the album, which began in Chiba, Japan on March 20, 2000, and ended in Honolulu, Hawaii on May 14, 2000. The Honolulu concert was attended by 6,000 people. The penultimate dates in Osaka on May 6 and 7, 2000, were attended by 30,000.

== Track listing ==
Genius 2000 track listing
No.	Title	Lyrics	Music	Arranger(s)	Length
1.	"Make the Connection Complete"		Tetsuya Komuro	Tetsuya Komuro	1:06
2.	"Love 2000"	Tetsuya Komuro, Takahiro Maeda, Sheila E., Lynn Mabry	Tetsuya Komuro, Sheila E, Lynn Mabry	Tetsuya Komuro, Sheila E, Lynn Mabry	5:12
3.	"Respect the Power of Love"	Tetsuya Komuro	Tetsuya Komuro	Tetsuya Komuro	5:26
4.	"Leavin' for Las Vegas"	Dallas Austin	Dallas Austin	Dallas Austin	4:39
5.	"Something 'Bout the Kiss"	Dallas Austin, Lysette, Titi, Chang Hai	Dallas Austin	Dallas Austin	4:25
6.	"I Have Never Seen"	Tetsuya Komuro	Tetsuya Komuro	Tetsuya Komuro	4:36
7.	"Still in Love"	Dallas Austin	Dallas Austin	Dallas Austin	4:17
8.	"Mi Corazon (Te' Amour)"	Tetsuya Komuro, Takahiro Maeda, Sheila E., Lynn Mabry	Tetsuya Komuro, Sheila E., Lynn Mabry, Renato Neto	Tetsuya Komuro, Sheila E., Lynn Mabry, Renato Neto	4:48
9.	"You Are the One" (featuring Imajin)	Tetsuya Komuro	Tetsuya Komuro	Tetsuya Komuro	5:48
10.	"Kiss-And-Ride"	Takahiro Maeda	Tetsuya Komuro, Cozy Kubo	Tetsuya Komuro, Cozy Kubo	3:48
11.	"Things I Collected"	Dallas Austin, Debra Killings	Dallas Austin, Debra Killings	Dallas Austin	6:18
12.	"Next to You"	Dallas Austin, Jasper Cameron	Dallas Austin, Jasper Cameron	Dallas Austin	4:15
13.	"Asking Why"	Nico (Namie Amuro)	Tetsuya Komuro	Tetsuya Komuro, Cozy Kubo	5:07
14.	"Give It a Try"	Tetsuya Komuro, Takahiro Maeda, Sheila E, Lynn Mabry	Tetsuya Komuro, Sheila E, Lynn Mabry	Tetsuya Komuro, Sheila E, Lynn Mabry	4:24
15.	"Log Off"		Tetsuya Komuro	Tetsuya Komuro	1:51

== Credits and personnel ==
=== Personnel ===
- Namie Amuro – vocals, background vocals
- Imajin – vocals, background vocals
- Terry Bradford – background vocals
- Alex Brown – background vocals
- Sheila E. – background vocals, drums, percussion
- Kiyoshi Hiyama – background vocals
- Yuko Kawai – background vocals
- Debra Killings – background vocals, bass guitar
- David Lawson – background vocals
- Maxayn Lewis – background vocals
- Lynn Mabry – background vocals
- Minako Obata – background vocals
- Takeo Saito – background vocals
- Kenji Sano – background vocals
- Naoki Takao – background vocals
- Will Wheaton Jr. – background vocals
- Tetsuya Komuro – acoustic piano, keyboard, synthesizer
- Tomi Martin – guitar
- Kazuhiro Matsuo – bass, guitar
- Chiharu Mikuzuki – bass
- Renato Neto – keyboard
- Ramon Stagnaro – guitar
- Michael Thompson – guitar

=== Production ===
- Producers – Dallas Austin, Tetsuya Komuro
- Mixing – Mike Butler, Alvin Speights
- Mixing assistant – Skye A.K. Correa
- Midi and sound design – Rick Sheppard
- Vocal direction – Kenji Sano
- Photography – Itaru Hirama
- Art direction – Tycoon Graphics

== Charts ==
=== Weekly charts ===
Chart (2000)	Peak position
Japanese Albums (Oricon)	1

=== Year-end charts ===
Chart (2000)	Position
Japanese Albums (Oricon)	28

== Sales and certifications ==
Region	Certification	Certified units/sales
Japan (RIAJ)	2× Platinum	802,740
