= I Have Never Seen =

- CD and streaming cover

Single by Namie Amuro

from the album Genius 2000
- Released: December 23, 1998
- Recorded: 1998
- Studio: True Kiss Disc; The Hit Factory; Audio Resource
- Genre: Pop
- Length: 4:46
- Label: Avex Trax
- Songwriter(s): Tetsuya Komuro
- Producer(s): Tetsuya Komuro

Namie Amuro singles chronology
"Dreaming I Was Dreaming" (1997)	"I Have Never Seen" (1998)	"Respect the Power of Love" (1999)

"I Have Never Seen" is the twelfth single by Japanese singer Namie Amuro. It was released by Avex Trax on December 23, 1998, as the lead single to her fourth studio album Genius 2000 (2000). The song was written and composed solely by Tetsuya Komuro. It was the first single released after Amuro's return from her yearlong maternity leave, and was released approximately one week before her well-publicized official comeback at the 49th NHK Kohaku Uta Gassen. "I Have Never Seen" is a melancholic power ballad, the lyrics of which describe experiencing things regular people have never experienced.

Music critics gave the song favorable reviews, praising Amuro's mellow vocals with some praising the single as one of Amuro's best works. "I Have Never Seen" was a commercial success, becoming her ninth number one single on the Oricon Singles Chart, and was her last until 2008's "60s 70s 80s." It earned a double platinum certification by the Recording Industry Association of Japan (RIAJ) for shipping over 800,000 copies nationwide.

Masashi Mutō directed the music video for the single, which appeared on her video albums Filmography (2001) and Best Clips (2002). The song also served as the theme song of the dorama Yonige-ya Honpo, which aired on the channel Nippon TV. The song has been reworked and re-recorded for Amuro's second greatest hits album, Love Enhanced Single Collection, released in 2002, as well as her final greatest hits album, Finally (2017).

== Background and composition ==
On October 22, 1997, Amuro announced that she had married Masaharu "Sam" Maruyama, a member of the group TRF, and was three months pregnant. She also said she planned to take a one-year hiatus in order to focus on starting a family. In the meantime, two releases were made: a re-issue of her "Can You Celebrate?" single, and her first greatest hits album, entitled 181920. On May 19, 1998, her son was born at Maruyama Memorial General Hospital in Saitama.

"I Have Never Seen"
A 24-second sample of "I Have Never Seen" (Single Mix)

In September 1998, Komuro received an order to produce a song, and at first he had in mind a flashy and glamorous song, but he took into account both Amuro's positions as "a private wife and mother" and "Amuro as a singer." Because she was expected to express "huge love as a mother," she was the first to express sad themes such as "broken heart," and as Komuro said, the production was as difficult as "putting her through the eye of a needle." He spent the next three months struggling with the concept, and at one point thought about running away. He spent two weeks in Hawaii working on it so that the sound would not lean toward the Japanese market. The song's lyrics were written on the plane to Narita. Komuro said, "The title includes the meaning of 'experiencing things that ordinary people have never experienced'" and "it has the feeling of a journey." Musically, it is a mellow power ballad track with a melancholic melody that speaks about experiencing things that ordinary people have never experienced. "I Have Never Seen" was released one week before her comeback at the 49th NHK Kohaku Uta Gassen.

== Release and promotion ==
A scene from the music video for "I Have Never Seen" features Namie Amuro singing in a dressing room.

Avex Trax released "I Have Never Seen" on December 23, 1998, as the lead single from Genius 2000. It was released as a mini CD single with a remix by Urban Soul. The standard CD was released in Hong Kong and Taiwan.

Masashi Mutō directed a music video showcasing Amuro preparing herself in a dressing room with several people. "I Have Never Seen" was used as the ending theme to the Nippon TV dorama, Yonige-ya Honpo (KIKU translation given as Flight By Night when it aired in Hawaii.) Maki Goto sang this song for an audition before becoming a part of Morning Musume. Since its release, "I Have Never Seen" has appeared on two of Amuro's concert tours and subsequent live releases: her Genius 2000 Tour and So Crazy Tour. "I Have Never Seen" was further re-worked and re-recorded for Amuro's second greatest hits album, Love Enhanced Single Collection (2002). Nineteen years after its release, Amuro re-recorded the track for her final compilation album, Finally (2017).

== Reception ==
Music critics gave "I Have Never Seen" positive reviews. AllMusic cited the song as a standout from Amuro's discography. Animefringe writer Diana Kou ousted the song as one of the album's highlights, comparing it to Tomomi Kahara and praising Amuro's soft vocals. The song's inclusion in Love Enhanced Single Collection was praised for its subdued, whispering vocals, accompanied by a shimmering sound.

Commercially, the single was a success in Japan. "I Have Never Seen" debuted at number one on the Oricon Singles Chart, with 333,210 copies sold in its first week, making it Amuro's ninth chart-topper. The single slid to number three the following week, selling 77,930 copies. On its third week it dropped to number four on the chart, selling 85,570 copies. "I Have Never Seen" ranked in the top ten for five weeks and ranked in the top 100 of the chart for thirteen weeks, selling a reported total of 772,130 copies. "I Have Never Seen" ranked at number 29 on the year-end Oricon Singles Chart for 1999, with 657,250 copies sold throughout the fiscal year. The single was certified double platinum by the Recording Industry Association of Japan (RIAJ) in January 1999 for 800,000 copies shipped to stores.

== Track listing ==
1. "I Have Never Seen (Single Mix)" (Tetsuya Komuro) – 4:46
2. "I Have Never Seen (With Her Soul Mix)" (Remixed by Urban Soul) – 5:34
3. "I Have Never Seen (Instrumental)" (Tetsuya Komuro) – 4:43

== Personnel ==
- Namie Amuro – vocals
- Kazuhiro Matsuo – guitar
- Yuko Kawai – background vocals
- David Lawson – background vocals
- Minako Obata – background vocals
- Kenji Sano – background vocals

== Production ==
- Producer – Tetsuya Komuro
- Arrangement – Tetsuya Komuro
- Mixing – Ken Kessie
- Remixing – Urban Soul

== Charts ==
=== Weekly charts ===
Chart (1999)	Peak position
Japan Singles (Oricon)	1
Taiwan Singles (IFPI Taiwan)	1

=== Monthly charts ===
Chart (1999)	Peak position
Japan Singles (Oricon)	2

=== Year-end charts ===
Chart (1999)	Position
Japan Singles (Oricon)	29

== Certification and sales ==
Region	Certification	Certified units/sales
Japan (RIAJ)	2× Platinum	772,130
