= Comeback (publicity) =

Return of a person of public interest after a long-term hiatus

A comeback, in terms of publicity, refers to a well-known person who returns to the activity that made them famous. A comeback can occur in any walk of life; notably in the entertainment industry, sports, and politics.

A comeback may occur after a public figure has been forced to withdraw from the public eye due to a real or perceived 'scandal'. It can also be said occur where an incident or release of information to the public has caused someone reputational harm, but upon returning to their previous activities, public opinion towards them becomes more favourable. This is notable in recent years, with the rise of so called 'cancel culture'. Where a person's reputation has been severely damaged due to their behaviour or publicly stated opinions, the individual is said to have experienced a 'comeback' in repairing and their public image.

== Entertainment ==
An entertainer may make a comeback after having been absent from their area of entertainment for a time.

In South Korea, talent agencies stage-manage the debut of new acts in order to create anticipation for the new act, which will often officially debut live on one of the main television music programs with a "debut stage". For the debut single, acts will have an overall "concept", a marketing hook, which influences the name of the act, clothes, choreography, catch phrases and how they are presented; within bands individual members will have a personal concept, this being a role that they will play within the band, e.g. leader, visual, maknae, rapper etc. Once a rookie act's debut cycle has ended they enter their second promotional cycle with a "comeback", called as such even when the musician or group in question did not go on hiatus. Each promotional cycle will be presented with its own concept.

== Sports ==
In sports, a comeback occurs where an athlete or a team returns to success after a period of poor performance or inactivity. "The comeback may be the most compelling phenomenon in sports. ... Comebacks in individual sports like tennis, boxing, or golf occur more commonly than in team sports, as athletes in these games have more control over their destiny".

== Politics ==
A politician may make a comeback after having left public life, either voluntarily or through loss of an election.
