= Toi et Moi (Namie Amuro song) =

Single by Namie Amuro
- Released: July 7, 1999
- Genre: Pop; electronic; R&B
- Label: Avex Trax
- Songwriters: Marc, Tetsuya Komuro
- Producer: Tetsuya Komuro

Namie Amuro singles chronology
"Respect the Power of Love" (1999)	"Toi et Moi" (1999)	"Something 'bout the Kiss" (1999)

"Toi et Moi" (トイ・エット・ムワー, Toi etto muwā), lit. "You and Me" in French, is Namie Amuro's 13th single under the Avex Trax label, released on July 7, 1999.

== Overview ==
"Toi et moi" is French for You and Me. The song was used as the ending theme to the Japanese version of the second Pokémon movie, Pokémon: The Movie 2000. Although she had already experimented with urban music in the past, this single is considered as her first real attempt at it. Despite that, this is her first single to have a more urban sound, and her step-away from dance-pop to urban-pop.

== Charts ==
"Toi et Moi" debuted at No. 3 with 121,970 copies sold in its first week, selling 272,110 copies in total. It charted for 11 weeks. "Toi et Moi" was the 85th best-selling single of 1999. It was certified gold for 200,000 copies shipped.

== Track listing ==
1. Toi et Moi – Straight Run (4:17)
2. Toi et Moi – A&S NY Bounce Remix (5:17)
3. Toi et Moi – TV Mix (4:15)

== Production ==
- Producer – Tetsuya Komuro
- Additional Production – Anthony ACID & DJ Scribble
- Arrangement – Tetsuya Komuro
- Writers – MARC & TK
- Mixing – Eddie Delena
- Remixing – Anthony ACID & DJ Scribble
