= Say the Word (Namie Amuro song) =

Single by Namie Amuro

from the album Love Enhanced Single Collection
- B-side: "Let's Not Fight"
- Released: August 8, 2001
- Recorded: 2001
- Length: 22:09
- Label: Avex Trax (CD); Rhythm Republic (vinyl)
- Songwriters: Namie Amuro; Ronald Malmberg; Thomas Johansson
- Producers: Ronald Malmberg; Thomas Johansson

Namie Amuro singles chronology
"Think of Me / No More Tears" (2001)	"Say the Word" (2001)	"I Will" (2002)

"Say the Word" is a song by Japanese recording artist Namie Amuro, and her 7th vinyl record. The CD single was released on August 8, 2001, by Avex Trax. The vinyl edition was released on September 12, 2001, by Rhythm Republic. This is Amuro's first single since severing ties with her former long-time producer Tetsuya Komuro. The song is not found on any of her studio records, but was later placed on her second best album Love Enhanced Single Collection, which was released five months later. It was produced by Swedish producers Ronald Malmberg and Thomas Johansson who are best known for their work with Swedish pop group A-Teens.

== Background and production ==
Amuro left Komuro's production after the release of "think of me/no more tears" in January 2001. She was 23 years old at the time. "I was very anxious," she recalled. "At first, I wondered what I was going to do," she said, looking back on that epoch. At that time, the person in charge of the record company at the time told Amuro, "You should start producing yourself," and Amuro pondered, "I just thought about what I could do for my son at that time and wrote down my honest thoughts in words," she revealed.

During the promoting for the single it was highlighted that this was Amuro's first single to have self written lyrics, with the lyrics being dedicated to her son, Haruto. However, Malmberg and Johansson previously sold the track to Danish artist Jeanett Debb and it was included on her album Virtualize, which was released in January 2001. Even though the lyrics are credited solely to Amuro, it shares English lines from Debb's version of the song. The version used in the commercial is different from the one found on the single, with it being closer to Jeanett's original version. This is one of two singles to feature lyrics which Amuro has written, with the other one being 2002's "I Will."

== Release and promotion ==
"Say the Word" was originally scheduled for release in July 2001, but was delayed a month for release in August 2001. Early promotion for the single touted it as her first as a singer-songwriter. A vinyl single issued through Rhythm Republic was released in September 2001. An exclusive remix of the title track, "Say the World (Clappy Mix)" was included on the a-side of the disc. 1,500 copies of it were released before it went out of print.

During year-end promotions where artists typically perform their most popular songs of the year in Japan, Amuro premiered a dance version of "Say the Word" on Best Artist 30. This version would later be released on the greatest hits album, Love Enhanced Single Collection (2002). The original version of the song has remained exclusive to its single and has not yet been released on an album. She also sung the song at the 52nd NHK Kohaku Uta Gassen as a part of the Red team (her seventh consecutive appearance at the prestigious event).

== Commercial endorsements ==
"Say the Word" was used as the commercial song for Kosé Cosmetics Luminous line of lipstick. The version featured in the commercial is both musically and lyrically different from the version commercially released. The lyrics featured in the commercial are: "Say the Word and I will be there for you / Aruite yukesou / Say the Word and make my dreams come true".

The English portions of the lyrics featured in the commercial match those written in Jeanett Debb's version, but were changed in the released version of the song. In the commercial itself, Amuro advertises Kosé's new line of waterproof lipstick, Luminus. It features her underwater and breaking through to grab hold of the cosmetic. She puts it on underwater to demonstrate the lipsticks ability stay on even under the most damp situations.

== Music video ==
The music video for "Say the Word," which was directed by Masashi Muto, was filmed on location in Ibaraki Prefecture and revolves around three scenes. The video opens up with Amuro entering the Odakyu bus. The song begins when she sits down and puts on headphones. The main scene of the video is a performance scene with Amuro dancing with four female dancers and two male dancers. The final scene of the video involved Amuro driving in a gold cadillac on an open road. The end of video has Amuro getting off the bus. As it comes to a stop the doors open to reveal nothing but water. The video was included on the Filmography 2001-2005 DVD.

== Commercial performance ==
"Say the Word" debuted at number three on the Oricon Singles Chart, with 64,070 copies sold in its first week. It descended to number eight on the singles chart the following week, shifting 36,900 units. On its third week the single plummeted to number thirteen on the chart with 25,950 copies sold. The single stayed in the top twenty one last week during its fourth charting week, ranking at number eighteen and selling 19,320 copies, before dropping out of the top twenty entirely the following week. "Say the Word" ranked in the top 100 for a total of eleven weeks and was the 109th best-selling single in Japan of 2001. Debuting in the top three after an all-time low chart debut by its predecessor, "think of me/no more tears" (2001), "Say the Word" was Amuro's last single to sell over 100,000 copies until her 26th single, "All for You" (2004).

== Track listing ==
=== CD single ===
1. "Say the Word" (Namie Amuro, Ronald Malmberg, Thomas Johansson) – 3:58
2. "Let's Not Fight" (Rie Matsumoto, Ramona Lyons, Jay Lyons) – 4:14
3. "Say the Word (Breeze House Mix)" (Remixed by Keiichi Ueno, Hiroshi Futami, Yuji Kudo) – 5:46
4. "Say the Word (Instrumental)" (Ronald Malmberg, Thomas Johansson) – 6:41
5. "Let's Not Fight (Instrumental)" (Ramona Lyons, Jay Lyons) – 4:14

=== Digital download ===
1. "Say the Word" (Namie Amuro, Ronald Malmberg, Thomas Johansson) – 3:58
2. "Let's Not Fight" (Rie Matsumoto, Ramona Lyons, Jay Lyons) – 4:14
3. "Say the Word (Breeze House Mix)" (Remixed by Keiichi Ueno, Hiroshi Futami, Yuji Kudo) – 5:46

=== Side A ===
1. "Say the Word (Breeze House Mix)" (Remixed by Keiichi Ueno, Hiroshi Futami, Yuji Kudo)
2. "Say the Word (Clappy Mix)" (Remixed by Keiichi Ueno)

=== Side B ===
1. "Say the Word (Original Mix)" (Namie Amuro, Ronald Malmberg, Thomas Johansson)
2. "Let's Not Fight" (Rie Matsumoto, Ramona Lyons, Jay Lyons)

== Credits and personnel ==
=== Personnel ===
- Namie Amuro – vocals, background vocals
- Hiroko Ishikawa – dancer
- IYO-P – dancer
- Shinnosuke Motoyama – dancer
- Yumeko – dancer

=== Production ===
- Producers – Ronald Malmberg, Thomas Johansson
- Arrangement – Kazuhiro Hara, Keiichi Ueno, Cobra Endo
- Mixing – Eddie Delena
- Music Video Director – Masashi Muto

== TV performances ==
- August 6, 2001 – Hey! Hey! Hey! Music Champ
- August 7, 2001 – AX Music Factory
- August 10, 2001 – Music Station
- August 25, 2001 – Pop Jam Summer Special
- August 30, 2001 – Utaban
- December 6, 2001 – FNS Music Festival
- December 19, 2001 – Best Artist 30
- December 24, 2001 – Hey! Hey! Hey! Music Champ X'mas Special Live V
- December 28, 2001 – Music Station Special Super Love 2001
- December 31, 2001 – 52nd Kōhaku Uta Gassen
- January 1, 2002 – A happy music year
- May 25, 2002 – MTV Video Awards Japan 2002
- July 28, 2002 – Music Fest Peace of RyuKyu
- September 29, 2002 – Asia 2002 Music Festival
- December 21, 2002 – MTV cool X'mas
- January 1, 2003 – CDTV Special Live 2002–2003
- February 8, 2003 – Pop Jam Special

== Charts ==
=== Weekly charts ===
Chart (2001)	Peak position
Japan Singles (Oricon)	3

=== Year-end charts ===
Chart (2001)	Position
Japan Singles (Oricon)	109

== Certifications ==
Region	Certification	Certified units/sales
Japan (RIAJ) Physical	Gold	183,840
Japan (RIAJ) Digital	Gold	100,000^{*}
^{*} Sales figures based on certification alone.
