= Love 2000 =

2000 single by Namie Amuro

- Single digital cover

Single by Namie Amuro

from the album Genius 2000
- B-side: "Asking Why"
- Released: January 1, 2000 (CD); February 16, 2000 (vinyl)
- Recorded: True Kiss Disc; Record Plant Studios; Record One; TK's Malibu Studio; Transcontinental Studios
- Length: 28:33 (limited); 20:46 (regular); 18:16 (vinyl)
- Label: Avex Trax
- Songwriter(s): Tetsuya Komuro; Sheila E.; Lynn Mabry; Takahiro Maeda
- Producer(s): Tetsuya Komuro

Namie Amuro singles chronology
"Something 'bout the Kiss" (1999)	"Love 2000" (2000)	"Never End" (2000)

"Love 2000" is Namie Amuro's 15th single on the Avex Trax label. First pressing privileges came with a bonus remix of the title track. The same remix was later included on a vinyl single released two months after the CD version, as their fourth and final single Genius 2000, Released in Japan on New Year's Day, the single debuted at #4 becoming her 15th consecutive top 10 solo single. The single was certified platinum for 400,000 copies shipped.

== Commercial tie-in ==
"Love 2000" was used in Kose cosmetics commercials for the Visee line.

== Track listing ==
Limited edition CD single

1. "Love 2000 (Straight Run)" (Tetsuya Komuro, Sheila E., Lynn Mabry, Takahiro Maeda) – 5:15
2. "Love 2000 (System Breakdown Mix)" (Remixed by Mike Butler) – 7:47
3. "Asking Why" (Nico, Tetsuya Komuro) – 5:10
4. "Love 2000 (Instrumental)" (Tetsuya Komuro, Sheila E., Lynn Mabry) – 5:14
5. "Asking Why" (Tetsuya Komuro) – 5:07

Regular CD single

1. "Love 2000 (Straight Run)" (Tetsuya Komuro, Sheila E., Lynn Mabry, Takahiro Maeda) – 5:15
2. "Asking Why" (Nico, Tetsuya Komuro) – 5:10
3. "Love 2000 (Instrumental)" (Tetsuya Komuro, Sheila E., Lynn Mabry) – 5:14
4. "Asking Why" (Tetsuya Komuro) – 5:07

Vinyl single
Side A

1. "Love 2000 (Straight Run)" (Tetsuya Komuro, Sheila E., Lynn Mabry, Takahiro Maeda) – 5:15

Side B

1. "Love 2000 (System Breakdown Mix)" (Remixed by Mike Butler) – 7:47
2. "Love 2000 (Instrumental)" (Tetsuya Komuro, Sheila E., Lynn Mabry) – 5:14

== Personnel ==
- Namie Amuro – vocals
- Sheila E. – background vocals, percussion, drums
- Lynn Mabry – background vocals
- Will Wheaton, Jr. – background vocals
- Terry Bradford – background vocals
- Mazayne Lewis – background vocals
- Alex Brown – background vocals
- Renato Neto – keyboards
- Kazuhiro Matsuo – guitar
- Chiharu Mikuzuki – bass guitar

== Production ==
- Producer – Tetsuya Komuro
- Arranger – Tetsuya Komuro, Sheila E., Lynn Mabry, Cozy Kubo
- Mixing – Mike Butler
- Remixing – Mike Butler
- Synthesizer programming – Akihisa Murakami, Toshihide Iwasa
- Art direction and design – Tycoon Graphics
- Photography – Itaru Hirama
- Styling – Sonya S. Park
- Hair and make-up – Akemi Nakano

== Charts ==
Oricon Sales Chart (Japan)

Release	Chart	Peak position	First week sales	Sales total
January 1, 2000	Oricon Weekly Singles Chart	4	165,940	228,120

== TV performances ==
- December 24, 1999 – Music Station
- January 1, 2000 – Music Station
- January 14, 2000 – Music Station
- January 31, 2000 – Hey! Hey! Hey! Music Champ
- February 4, 2000 – Music Station
- March 31, 2000 – Music Station
- April 3, 2000 – Hey! Hey! Hey! Music Champ Awards (performed "Asking Why")
- July 28, 2002 – Music Fest Peace of Ryukyu
- September 29, 2002 – ASIA 2002 Music Festival
