= Something 'Bout the Kiss =

- Standard CD cover

Single by Namie Amuro

from the album Genius 2000
- Released: September 1, 1999
- Recorded: July 1999
- Studio: Darp (Atlanta); True Kiss Disc (Tokyo); Yamaha Epicurus (Tokyo)
- Genre: R&B; J-pop
- Length: 4:25
- Label: Avex Trax
- Songwriters: Dallas Austin; Lysette Titi; Chan Hai; Jasper Cameron
- Producer: Austin

Namie Amuro singles chronology
"Toi et Moi" (1999)	"Something 'Bout the Kiss" (1999)	"Love 2000" (2000)

Alternative cover
- Mini disc cover

"Something ‘Bout the Kiss" is a song by Japanese singer Namie Amuro. It was released on September 1, 1999, by Avex Trax, and serves as the third single from her fourth studio album Genius 2000 (2000). Furthermore, all physical and digital formats included an additional B-side called "You Are the One", which appears on the parent album. "Something 'Bout the Kiss" was written by Lysette Titi, Chan Hai, and its producer Dallas Austin. Musically, it is a midtempo contemporary R&B track with a melancholic melody.

Music critics praised "Something 'Bout the Kiss" for its production quality, describing it as an important moment in Amuro's transition to R&B music. Critics acknowledged the song as a career highlight, while winning the Yoshida Tadashi Award at the Japan Cable Broadcasting Awards. It was a commercial success in Japan, with two formats reaching the top ten on the Oricon Singles Chart and being certified gold twice by the Recording Industry Association of Japan (RIAJ) for more than 100,000 sales across both formats.

Masashi Mutō directed the music video for the single, which appeared on her video albums Filmography (2001) and Best Clips (2002). The song also served as the commercial theme for the Japanese cosmetics brand Kosé. It was also featured on the set lists of three Amuro concerts and subsequent live releases. "Something 'Bout the Kiss" has been reworked and re-recorded for Amuro's second greatest hits album, Love Enhanced Single Collection, released in 2002.

== Development and composition ==
"SOMETHING 'BOUT THE KISS"
"Something 'Bout The Kiss" is a melancholic contemporary R&B track

After the success of her third studio album Concentration 20 (1997), Amuro began working with producer Tetsuya Komuro to create new music. During the sessions, Komuro approached American producer Dallas Austin about collaborating with him and Amuro's team on new music. He accepted the invitation and submitted demo recordings to Komuro. Amuro was excited about the opportunity to work with Austin because she had admired his work with the American girl group TLC, which had inspired her at the time.

The collaboration resulted in the songs "Something 'Bout the Kiss", "Leavin' for Las Vegas", "Still in Love", and "Things I Collected", which all appeared on the parent album Genius 2000 (2000). Lysette Titi, Chan Hai, and Austin wrote "Something 'Bout the Kiss", with Junko Kudo translating some of the lyrics into Japanese; the chorus section and rap during the bridge used English lyrics. Musically, it is a midtempo contemporary R&B track with a melancholic melody and it has been described as Amuro's attempt to incorporate Western elements into her music. The B-side song "You Are The One" was originally released on New Year's Day 1997 under the name TK PRESENTS, and was re-recorded as a duet version by Amuro and IMAJIN, an R&B group. This version was performed in 2000 during the "NAMIE AMURO TOUR "GENIUS 2000"", her first national tour since returning to the music scene.

== Release and promotion ==
Avex Trax released "Something 'Bout the Kiss" on September 1, 1999, as the third single from Genius 2000. It was released as a standard CD with four additional tracks, including the B-side "You Are The One" featuring Imajin. The mini CD contains three songs without the All Out mix from the previous format and has a different cover art. The standard CD was released in Hong Kong in October of that year. On November 19, Rhythm Republic released a vinyl with four additional tracks, Amuro's first single on the format.

Masashi Mutō directed a music video showcasing Amuro in minimalist rooms with minimal furnishings. In one scene, Amuro is seen performing in a long gown with two backup dancers. (Note: Video description taken from footage on both Filmography and Best Clips.) The video later appeared on her video albums Filmography (2001) and Best Clips (2002). The song also served as the commercial theme for Kosè, a Japanese cosmetics company which included Amuro. "Something 'Bout the Kiss" was later added to Amuro's setlist for three different tours: Genius 2000, Break the Rules, and So Crazy. "Something 'Bout the Kiss" was further re-worked and re-recorded for Amuro's second greatest hits album, Love Enhanced Single Collection (2002).

== Reception ==
Music critics gave "Something 'Bout the Kiss" positive reviews. AllMusic cited the song as a standout from Amuro's discography. Animefringe writer Diana Kou praised Amuro's delivery and overall sound, naming it one of her favourite songs from Genius 2000. Japanese magazine CDJournal gave the song a mixed review, questioning Amuro's execution but highlighting Austin's contributions. However, its inclusion in the Love Enhanced Singles Collection was praised for its R&B sound as well as its "melancholic" and "authentic" vibe. Furthermore, "Something' Bout the Kiss" received the Yoshida Tadashi Award at the Japan Cable Broadcasting Awards in 1999.

Commercially, it was a success in Japan. The CD version of the single debuted at number three on the Oricon Singles Chart, selling 130,510 units, while the mini CD debuted at number seven, selling 49,160 in its first week. Both formats spent eight weeks on the chart, with the CD version finishing as the 87th best-selling single of the year, selling over 253,000 copies in the region. The Recording Industry Association of Japan (RIAJ) certified both formats gold for sales exceeding 100,000 copies.

== Formats and track listing ==
CD / digital / streaming formats

1. "Something 'Bout the Kiss" – 4:26
2. "You Are The One" – 5:31
3. "Something 'Bout the Kiss" (The All Out Mix) – 5:52
4. "Something 'Bout the Kiss" (Instrumental) – 4:26

Mini CD

1. "Something 'Bout the Kiss" – 4:26
2. "You Are The One" – 5:31
3. "Something 'Bout the Kiss" (Instrumental) – 4:26

== Credits and personnel ==
Credits adapted from the liner notes of Genius 2000.

Locations

- Recorded at Darp Studios in Atlanta, and True Kiss Disc Studios and Yamaha Epicurus Studio in Tokyo. Mixed at Darp Studios in Atlanta.

Personnel

- Namie Amuro - vocals
- Debra Killings - backing vocals
- Alvin Speights - audio mixer
- Vernon J. Mungo - audio mixing assistant
- Dallas Austin - arranger, composer, producer, songwriter
- Carlton Lynn - recorder
- Teruyuki Satake - recording assistant
- Rick Sheppard - sound designer
- Chan Hai - songwriter
- Lysette Titi - songwriter
- Jasper Cameron - songwriter
- Kimberly Smith - production coordinator

== Charts ==
=== Weekly charts ===
Chart (1999)	Peak position
Japan Singles (Oricon) (12 cm)	3
Japan Singles (Oricon) (8 cm)	7

=== Year-end charts ===
Chart (1999)	Position
Japan Singles (Oricon) (12 cm)	87

== Certifications ==
Region	Certification	Certified units/sales
Japan (RIAJ) 12cm	Gold	253,500
Japan (RIAJ) 8cm	Gold	110,600

== Release history ==
"Something 'Bout the Kiss" release history
Region	Date	Format	Label	Ref(s).
Japan	September 1, 1999	CD single; mini CD	Avex Trax	
Hong Kong	October 1999	CD single	Avex Trax	
Japan	November 1999	Vinyl	Rhythm Republic	
Various	N/A/	Digital download; streaming	Avex Trax	
