= Respect the Power of Love =

Single by Namie Amuro

from the album Genius 2000
- Released: March 17, 1999
- Recorded: January 1999
- Genre: Pop; dance
- Length: 12:39
- Label: Avex Trax
- Songwriter: Tetsuya Komuro
- Producer: Tetsuya Komuro

Namie Amuro singles chronology
"I Have Never Seen" (1998)	"Respect the Power of Love" (1999)	"Toi et Moi" (1999)

"Respect the Power of Love" (stylized as RESPECT the POWER OF LOVE) is the 13th single from Japanese recording artist Namie Amuro. The song was released on March 17, 1999, by Avex Trax. It is her second single to be released after her hiatus and taken from her fourth studio album Genius 2000 (2000). "Respect the Power of Love" was solely written composed and arranged by her long-time producer Tetsuya Komuro The pop-, R&B-, and dance-influenced track incorporates traces of gospel in its bridge and crescendo. Lyrically, the female protagonist sings about the sensibilities that she saw with her own eyes and within her reach.

Music critics praised "Respect the Power of Love" for its production quality, especially during its pre-chorus, and acknowledged the song as a career highlight. It was a commercial success in Japan, peaking at number two on the Oricon Singles Chart, and was certified platinum by the Recording Industry Association of Japan (RIAJ) for more than 400,000 copies shipped nationwide.

Masashi Mutō directed the music video for the single, which appeared on her video albums Filmography (2001) and Best Clips (2002). "Respect the Power of Love" also served as an advertising jingle for a KOSÉ "VISEE" commercial featuring Amuro herself. The single was released on the same day that Amuro's mother, Emiko Taira, was murdered. Following this news, Amuro immediately canceled the promotion for the single and returned home to her home prefecture Okinawa to identify her mother's body.

== Commercial tie-in ==
The song is an advertising jingle for a KOSÉ "VISEE" commercial featuring Amuro herself. The version featured on the "VISEE" commercial has a slightly different arrangement from the one on the CD.

== Commercial performance ==
"RESPECT the POWER OF LOVE" opened at number two on the Oricon Singles Chart with 200,610 copies sold in its first week (being out sold by "Dango 3 Kyodai", the fifth best-selling single of all time in Japan). It dropped to number five the next week, selling 82,260 copies. On its third week the single climbed up to number four on the chart, selling 81,880 copies. The single stayed in the top ten one last week, ranking at number six and selling 39,040 copies. "RESPECT the POWER OF LOVE" lasted 10 weeks in the top 100, along with becoming the 43rd best-selling single in Japan of 1999. It received a platinum certification by the RIAJ for selling more than 400,000 copies nationwide.

== Cancelled promotion ==
On March 17, 1999, the day the song was released, the murder of Namie Amuro's mother occurred. On the day of the song's release, a press conference for the "nice One" commercial in which she was scheduled to appear was abruptly canceled, and all promotional activities were temporarily halted as a result of the unfortunate incident. In January 2000, she announced on her official homepage, "At that time, I was seriously thinking of retiring. However, I was encouraged by the heartfelt words of my fandom, and I was finally able to get back on my feet." She later added, "I am so glad that the song I sang at that time was 'RESPECT the POWER OF LOVE.' I was able to cheer myself up when I sang it. If it had been any other song, I might have cried and not been able to sing...".

== Live performances ==
Amuro participated in the 50th NHK Kohaku Uta Gassen (for the fifth year in a row) and performed the song "RESPECT the POWER OF LOVE" with a gospel choir while wearing a dress made out of denim fabric.

== Track listing ==
1. "Respect the Power of Love - Straight Run" – 4:21
2. "Respect the Power of Love - NYC Uptown remix" – 4:01
3. "Respect the Power of Love - Instrumental" – 4:17

== Personnel ==
- Namie Amuro – vocals

== Production ==
- Producer – Tetsuya Komuro
- Additionally Production – Rob Arbittier & Gary Adante
- Mixing – Eddie Delena
- Remixing – Roland Clark

== TV performances ==
- March 12, 1999 – Music Station
- March 15, 1999 – Hey! Hey! Hey!
- March 23, 1999 – Utaban
- March 27, 1999 – Pop Jam
- March 29, 1999 – Hey! Hey! Hey! Music Awards III
- April 2, 1999 – Music Station Special
- December 27, 1999 – SMAPxSMAP
- December 31, 1999 – 50th Kōhaku Uta Gassen

== Charts ==
Chart (1999)	Peak position
Japan Weekly Singles (Oricon)	2
Japan Monthly Singles (Oricon)	3
Japan Yearly Singles (Oricon)	43

== Certification and sales ==
Region	Certification	Certified units/sales
Japan (RIAJ)	Platinum	491,920
