= MAX discography =

- Studio albums: 5
- Compilation albums: 5
- Tribute albums: 2
- Singles: 32
- B-sides: 31
- Music videos: 4
- Live concerts: 5
- Films: 2

Japanese female vocal/dance unit, MAX has released five studio albums, four compilations, seven remix albums, one cover album, and 41 singles. Three of their albums, Maximum (1996), Maximum Groove (1998), and Maximum Collection have topped the Oricon album charts. Four of their albums, including Maximum, Maximum II (1997), Maximum Groove, and Maximum Collection have been certified million selling albums by RIAJ. The group have 15 consecutive top ten singles, 16 overall. Their sixth single, "Give Me a Shake" (1997) is their best selling single and their only single to top the Oricon singles chart. Since their debut on May 10, 1995, the group has amassed sales of over 10 million albums and singles in Japan.

== Albums ==
=== Studio albums ===
Title	Album details	Oricon albums sales chart peak positions and sales				Certifications
Title	Album details	Weekly	Yearly	Debut	Overall	Certifications
Maximum	Released: December 11, 1996; Label: Avex; Formats: CD, digital download	1	15	449,510	1,288,260	RIAJ: Million
Maximum II	Released: December 25, 1997; Label: Avex; Formats: CD, digital download	2	23	707,730	1,074,530	RIAJ: Million
Maximum Groove	Released: December 2, 1998; Label: Avex; Formats: CD, digital download	1	27	322,300	824,370	RIAJ: Million
Emotional History	Released: March 14, 2001; Label: Avex; Formats: CD, digital download	8	–	63,220	107,950	RIAJ: Gold
Jewel of Jewels	Released: February 22, 2006; Label: Sonic Groove; Formats: CD, digital download	53	–		5,607	RIAJ:

=== Cover album ===
Title	Album detail	Oricon albums sales chart peak positions and sales				Certifications
Title	Album detail	Weekly	Yearly	Debut	Overall	Certifications
Be MAX	Released: September 8, 2010; Label: Sonic Groove; Formats: CD, digital download	19		2,162	10,683	RIAJ

=== Mini-album ===
Title	Album detail	Oricon albums sales chart peak positions and sales				Certifications
Title	Album detail	Weekly	Yearly	Debut	Overall	Certifications
Tora Tora Tora	Released: January 1, 2022; Label: Sonic Groove; Formats: digital download	–				

=== Compilation albums ===
Release	Title	Oricon albums sales chart peak positions and sales				Notes
Release	Title	Weekly	Yearly	Debut	Overall	Notes
September 29, 1999	Maximum Collection	1	32	456,070	805,360	Greatest hits package; Certified million seller
March 20, 2002	Precious Collection 1995–2002	10	–	51,400	93,260	Single collection
December 4, 2010	avex archives COMPLETE BEST MAX	–	–			
December 23, 2015	Maximum Perfect Best	18	–	1,099	8,288	3CD+DVD, 3CD+Blu-ray and CD only package; Including all A-side singles (excl. Prism of Eyes) with all songs as 3-piece unit; Contains 2 new songs

=== Remix albums ===
Release	Title	Oricon albums sales chart peak positions and sales				Notes
Release	Title	Weekly	Yearly	Debut	Overall	Notes
June 28, 2000	Super Eurobeat presents Hyper Euro Max	5	96	104,620	206,390	Eurobeat remix album
August 21, 2002	Maximum Trance	29	–	–	13,760	Trance remix album
December 10, 2008	New Edition ~Maximum Hits~	30	–	8,466	18,111	CD/CD+DVD release; Greatest hits remix package; Contains new vocals
January 27, 2016	MAX ALL SINGLES NON STOP MIX	–	–			Continuous Mix; Only digital release
July 31, 2019	New Edition II ~Maximum Hits~	20	–	2,588		CD+2DVD edition, CD+Blu-ray edition, or regular CD edition; Contains 3 new songs
November 2, 2022	MAX ga Tomaranai. NONSTOP vol.1	–	–			Continuous Mix; Only digital release
November 2, 2022	MAX ga Tomaranai. NONSTOP vol.2	–	–			Continuous Mix; Only digital release

=== Participation in tribute and cover albums ===
Release	Album	Tracks
July 24, 1997	Velfarre J-pop Night presents Dance With You	"Douni mo Tomaranai"; "Katte ni Shiyagare"; "S.O.S"; "Seishun Jidai"; "UFO"
12/03/2008	Vision Factory Compilation; ~Aku Yuu Sakka Seikatsu 40 Shuunen Kinen~	"Monday Mona Lisa"
08/09/2010	BE MAX	"CAT'S EYE"
02/03/2011	BEGIN 20th ANNIVERSARY SPECIAL TRIBUTE ALBUM	"Ai ga Hashiru"
15/11/2017	Aku Yu Tribute Special Songs ~Asahi no Youni~	"Monday Mona Lisa Club"; "S・O・S (Rearrange ver.)"; "Kuruwasetai no (Rearrange ver.)"; "Dou ni mo Tomoranai (Rearrange ver.)"; "UFO (Rearrange ver.)"; "Seishun Jidai"

=== Participation in other albums ===
Release	Album	Tracks
August 25, 1995	We Love Saturday Night!!	Di Di La La La ~Shigoto ga Koi no Jama wo Suru~
November 21, 2007	Christmas Harmony ~Vision Factory Presents~	"No.1 ~My Lady~"
February 13, 2008	Spring Harmony: Vision Factory Presents	"A Special Day"

== Singles ==
Release	Title	Oricon singles sales chart peak positions and sales				Album
Release	Title	Weekly	Yearly	Debut	Overall	Album
May 10, 1995	"Koi Suru Velfarre Dance ~Saturday night~"	91	—	3,550	3,550	Maximum
August 21, 1995	"Kiss Me Kiss Me, Baby"	63	—	5,380	10,920	Maximum
February 21, 1996	"Tora Tora Tora"	19	149	33,130	189,320	Maximum
July 17, 1996	"Seventies"	7	119	66,860	252,550	Maximum
October 9, 1996	"Get My Love!"	4	152	76,790	198,500	Maximum
April 9, 1997	"Give Me A Shake"	1	67	172,200	476,570	Maximum II
July 30, 1997	"Love Is Dreaming"	4	105	109,880	283,890	Maximum II
October 29, 1997	"Shinin'on-Shinin'love"	4	165	86,640	276,510	Maximum II
April 22, 1998	"Hikari no Veil"	5	93	118,270	261,450	Maximum Groove
July 23, 1998	"Ride On Time"	4	74	60,360	312,500	Maximum Groove
September 9, 1998	"Grace of My Heart"	2	99	110,810	243,260	Maximum Groove
March 3, 1999	"Love Impact"	8	124	84,050	176,370	Maximum Collection
May 26, 1999	"Ano Natsu Eto"	7	181	63,790	118,260	Maximum Collection
August 25, 1999	"Ginga no Chikai"	5	147	70,460	148,590	Maximum Collection
November 25, 1999	"Isshoni..."	8	80	73,160	341,700	Emotional History
February 16, 2000	"Never Gonna Stop It"	9	142	71,640	152,560	Emotional History
May 24, 2000	"Magic"	10	224	47,390	78,930	Emotional History
September 6, 2000	"Barairo no Hibi"	11	231	45,630	74,920	Emotional History
February 15, 2001	"Always Love"	12	274	32,760	49,790	Emotional History
May 16, 2001	"Perfect Love"	10	293	26,210	46,130	Precious Collection 1995–2002
September 27, 2001	"Moonlight"	13	—	17,240	27,540	Precious Collection 1995–2002
December 5, 2001	"Feel So Right"	17	—	16,070	24,030	Precious Collection 1995–2002
February 20, 2002	"Spring Rain"	28	—	13,690	19,530	Precious Collection 1995–2002
November 20, 2002	"Eternal White"	20	—	9,280	15,015	Jewel of Jewels
March 12, 2003	"Festa"	32	—	6,154	8,959	Jewel of Jewels
August 6, 2003	"Love Screw"	39	—	4,070	6,276	Jewel of Jewels
June 30, 2004	"Be With You"	34	—	3,895	5,104	Jewel of Jewels
July 6, 2005	"Nirai Kanai"	38	896	3,782	6,148	Jewel of Jewels
November 30, 2005	"Anata wo Omou Hodo"	53	—	2,348	2,834	Jewel of Jewels
August 2, 2006	"Splash Gold -Natsu no Kiseki- / Prism of Eyes"	60	—	2,202	2,760	Maximum Perfect Best
July 22, 2009	"Rough Cut Diamond"	28	967	3,342	4,426	Maximum Perfect Best
May 12, 2010	"Cat's Eye"	27	715	4,541	6,891	BE MAX
August 7, 2013	"Tacata'"	32		3,579	9,879	Maximum Perfect Best
September 10, 2014	"Jounetsu no ZUMBA"	42				Maximum Perfect Best
January 15, 2015	"Heartbreaker"	—				Maximum Perfect Best
July 22, 2015	"#SELFIE ~ONNA Now~"	40				Maximum Perfect Best
November 25, 2015	"Mi Mi Mi"	—				Maximum Perfect Best
June 26, 2019	"Parthenon"	39		1,706		New Edition II ~Maximum Hits~
December 9, 2020	"Issho ni... (Happiness 2020)"	—				TBA
July 28, 2021	"Do Shot"	25		2,050		TBA
November 13, 2024	"BOOM BOOM BOMB-BA-YEA"	27		1159		TBA

== B-sides ==
Year	Title	Featured release
1996	"So Much in Love"	"Tora Tora Tora"
1996	"Summer Time"	"Seventies"
1996	"Broken Heart"	"Get My Love"
1997	"Kiss to Kiss"	"Give Me a Shake"
1997	"Wonderland"	"Love is Dreaming"
1997	"I Will"	"Shinin'on-Shinin'love"
1998	"So Real"	"Hikari no Veil"
1998	"Don't You Love Me"	"Ride on Time"
1998	"Getting Over"	"Grace of my Heart"
1999	"How Much I Love You"	"Love Impact"
1999	"Natsu yo Saite"	"Ano Natsu Eto"
1999	"We'll Be Together"	"Ginga no Chikai"
1999	"Powder Shadow"	"Isshoni..."
2000	"So Special Love"	"Never Gonna Stop It"
2000	"Get Ready?"	"Never Gonna Stop It"
2000	"Unforgettable"	"Magic"
2000	"Whispers"	"Magic"
2000	"Wired"	"Barairono Hibi"
2001	"Just Wanna Lovin' You"	"Always Love"
2001	"Bible XX"	"Perfect Love"
2001	"Paradise Lost"	"Moonlight"
2001	"Manatsu no Eve"	"Feel so Right"
2002	"Party Tune"	"Spring Rain"
2002	"Another Truth"	"Eternal White"
2003	"Stay"	"Festa"
2003	"Don't Call Me"	"Love Screw"
2004	"Don't Lose Yourself"	"Be With You"
2005	"Someday"	"Nirai Kanai"
2005	"Tora Tora Tora 2005"	"Nirai Kanai"
2005	"Wonder Woman"	"Anata wo Omou Hodo"
2009	"The Power of Love"	"Rough Cut Diamond"
2010	"Arabesque"	"Cat's Eye"
2010	"Wonder Woman Returns"	"Cat's Eye"
2013	"Summer Dream"	"Tacata'"
2014	"Sweet Sweet Honey"	"Jounetsu no ZUMBA"
2014	"BOOM BOOM BOOM"	"Jounetsu no ZUMBA"
2015	"Ole! ~Happy Birthday~"	"#SELFIE ~ONNA Now~"
2019	"Dracula"	"Parthenon"
2021	"Viva la Mambo"	"Do Shot"
2021	"Issho ni... (Happiness 2020)"	"Do Shot"
2021	"SIMIUS SONG MAX Version."	"Do Shot"
2024	"Midnight Lover"	"BOOM BOOM BOMB-BA-YEA"
2024	"Revival Bubble"	"BOOM BOOM BOMB-BA-YEA"
2024	"Lovin' Me"	"BOOM BOOM BOMB-BA-YEA"

== Filmography ==
=== Films ===
Release	Title
March 15, 1996	Ladies MAX
March 15, 1997	Ladies MAX ~Give me a Shake~

=== Music videos ===
Release	Title
February 25, 1998	Maximum Clips
March 29, 2000	Maximum Clips II
March 20, 2002	Precious Clip Collection 1995–2002
12/11/2002	MAX Best Clips

=== Live concerts ===
Release	Title
10/08/1997	J-Pop Gig Tour 1997
11/10/1999	MAX Live Contact 1999 ~Sunny Holiday~
September 27, 2000	MAX Live Contact 2000 ~No Boundly~
October 24, 2001	MAX Live Contact 2001 ~Bitter 4 Sweet~
08/05/2009	MAX presents Live Contact 2009 "New Edition"
27/01/2016	MAX 20th Live Contact 2015 Back To The MAX Future

=== Other ===
Release	Title
October 25, 1995	Dance Matrix '95 Disco Week in Velfarre
12/04/1996	Namie Amuro Anniversary Live in Chiba Marine Stadium
