= New Edition: Maximum Hits =

New Edition ~Maximum Hits~

Remix album by MAX
- Released: December 10, 2008
- Genre: Pop, House
- Length: 1:02:31
- Label: Sonic Groove

MAX chronology
Jewel of Jewels (2006)	New Edition ~Maximum Hits~ (2008)	Be MAX (2010)

Alternative cover
- The cover for the CD+DVD edition

New Edition ~Maximum Hits~ is MAX's third remix compilation. The album was released to celebrate the return of the original line-up of MAX and includes 12 brand new remixes of some of their biggest hits. The album was released in a standalone CD format as well as a CD and DVD package on December 10, 2008. The CD and DVD package contains 12 original music videos and a behind-the-scenes look at the photography for the album. A new song, "Are You Ready?" was included as a bonus track.

== Track listing ==
=== CD - New mix ===
#	Title	Songwriters	Time
1.	"Ride On Time (Eighteen Degrees. Mix)"	Goro Matsui, Kiichi Yokoyama	4:42
2.	"Love Is Dreaming (Takashi Ikezawa Mix)"	Yuko Ebine, Joey Carbone, Jeff Carruthers	5:25
3.	"Shinin'on-Shinin'love (Takashi Ikezawa Mix)"	Hiromi Mori, Keiichi Ueno	4:50
4.	"Ginga no Chikai (Sada Mix)"	HIM	5:25
5.	"Love Impact (Pax Japonica Groove Mix)"	Hiromi Mori, Jun Abe	4:34
6.	"Isshoni... (Gira Mundo Mix)"	Pipeline Project	5:44
7.	"Seventies (Anthology Disc Studio Mix)"	Kazumi Suzuki, Groovesurfers	4:43
8.	"Get My Love! (Ryosuke Nakanishi aka Studio-R Mix)"	Yuko Ebine, Syrups	3:45
9.	"Tora Tora Tora (DJ Planet Mix)"	Kazumi Suzuki, Tiger Boys	3:54
10.	"Give Me a Shake (Wall5, SpiceMagic Mix)"	Yuko Ebine, Yasuhiko Hoshino	5:10
11.	"Grace of My Heart (Ryosuke Nakanishi aka Studio-R Mix)"	Yuko Ebine, Kenji Suzuki	4:59
12.	"Hikari no Veil (Clazziquai Project Remix)"	Goro Matsui, Kiichi Yokoyama	5:50
13.	"Are You Ready?"	Mona, Adam Baptiste, David Astrom, Patrik Berggren	3:39

=== DVD - Original video clips ===
#	Title
1.	"Tora Tora Tora"
2.	"Seventies"
3.	"Get My Love!"
4.	"Give me a Shake"
5.	"Love is Dreaming"
6.	"Shinin'on-Shinin'love"
7.	"Hikari no Veil"
8.	"Ride on time"
9.	"Grace of my heart"
10.	"Love impact"
11.	"Ginga no Chikai"
12.	"Isshoni..."
13.	"Making (2008 photo session)"

== Charts ==
Album - Oricon Sales Chart (Japan)

Release	Chart	Peak position	Sales total
December 10, 2008	Oricon Weekly Albums Chart	30	18,111
