= Precious Collection 1995–2002 =

Greatest hits album by MAX
- Released: March 20, 2002
- Recorded: 1995–2002
- Genre: Pop, dance, Eurobeat
- Label: Avex Trax
- Producer: Max Matsuura

MAX chronology
Emotional History (2001)	Precious Collection 1995–2002 (2002)	Maximum Trance (2002)

Singles from Precious Collection 1995-2002
- 1. "Perfect Love" Released: May 16, 2001; 2. "Moonlight" Released: September 27, 2001; 3. "Feel So Right" Released: December 5, 2001; 4. "Spring Rain" Released: February 20, 2002

Precious Collection 1995–2002 is a singles collection released by Japanese dance unit, MAX. It was released on March 20, 2002, on the avex trax label. The album compiled all of the group's first 23 singles on a two disc set. Due to lead vocalist Mina's pending hiatus because of pregnancy, the album replaced their original fifth studio album that was set for release at the time. First pressing of the album include a bonus track, "Spring Rain (M.H.JS Mix)" and a commemorative photo booklet. The album peaked at number 10 on Oricon Albums Chart.

== Track listing ==
Disc 1

1. Koi Suru Velfarre Dance: Saturday Night (恋するヴェルファーレダンス 〜Saturday Night〜)
2. Kiss Me Kiss Me, Baby
3. TORA TORA TORA
4. Seventies
5. GET MY LOVE!
6. Give Me a Shake
7. Love Is Dreaming
8. Shinin'on-Shinin'love
9. Hikari no Veil (閃光 -ひかり- のVEIL; Veil of Light)
10. Ride On Time
11. Grace of My Heart
12. Love Impact

Disc 2

1. Ano Natsu e to (あの夏へと; And to That Summer)
2. Ginga no Chikai (銀河の誓い; Vow of the Milky Way)
3. Issho ni... (一緒に・・・; Together)
4. Never Gonna Stop It
5. MAGIC
6. Barairo no Hibi (バラ色の日々; The Rose Colored Days)
7. always love
8. Perfect Love
9. Moonlight
10. Feel So Right
11. Spring Rain
12. Spring Rain (M.H.JS MIX)
