= Super Eurobeat presents Hyper Euro Max =

Remix album by MAX
- Released: June 28, 2000
- Genre: Eurobeat
- Label: Avex Trax

MAX chronology
| Maximum Collection (1999) | Super Eurobeat presents Hyper Euro Max (2000) | Emotional History (2001) |

Super Eurobeat presents Hyper Euro Max is the first remix album released by Japanese girlgroup MAX, featuring Eurobeat-style remixes of the group's songs. It was released on June 28, 2000, on the Avex Trax label, and reached number five on the Oricon weekly charts.

== Track listing ==
1. Ano Natsu e to (Time Go Go remix) (あの夏へと; And to That Summer)
2. Hikari no Veil (traditional mix) (閃光 -ひかり- のVEIL; Veil of Light)
3. Ginga no Chikai (Eurosenti remix) (銀河の誓い; Vow of the Milky Way)
4. Issho ni... (Sweet Mix) (一緒に・・・; Together)
5. Love Impact (melodic remix)
6. Love Is Dreaming (Eurobeat mix)
7. Shinin'on-Shinin'love (aggressive mix)
8. Give Me a Shake (Euro-Power mix)
9. HARMONY (Eurobeat Mix) (from the album Maximum II)
10. I will (Sentimental Mix) (from the single Shinin'on-Shinin'love)
11. Grace of My Heart (Maximum mix)
12. Ride On Time (Eurobeat mix)

== Charts ==
Album - Oricon Sales Chart (Japan)

| Release | Chart | Peak position | Sales total |
|---|---|---|---|
| June 28, 2000 | Oricon Weekly Albums Chart | 5 | 206,390 |
