= Perfect Love (disambiguation) =

"Perfect Love" is a song by Trisha Yearwood from her 1998 album (Songbook) A Collection of Hits

It may also refer to:

== Songs ==
- "Perfect Love" (MAX song), from their 2001 album Precious Collection 1995–2002
- "Perfect Love" (Simply Red song), song by Simply Red from their 2005 album Simplified
- "Perfect Love" (Loona song), song by South Korean group Loona from their 2018 EP + +

== Other uses ==
- Parfait amour! (Eng: Perfect Love), a 1996 film by Catherine Breillat
