= Jewel of Jewels =

Studio album by MAX
- Released: February 22, 2006
- Recorded: 2002–2006
- Genre: Pop, Okinawan Folk, Bossa Nova, Latin
- Length: 53:45
- Label: Sonic Groove
- Producer: MAX

MAX chronology
Maximum Trance (2002)	Jewel of Jewels (2006)	New Edition: Maximum Hits (2008)

Singles from Jewels of Jewels
- 1. "Eternal White" Released: November 20, 2002; 2. "Festa" Released: March 12, 2003; 3. "Love Screw" Released: August 6, 2003; 4. "Be With You" Released: June 30, 2004; 5. "Nirai Kanai" Released: July 6, 2005; 6. "Anata wo Omou Hodo" Released: November 30, 2005

Jewel of Jewels is MAX's fifth original studio album released five years after their last album, Emotional History (2001). It is their first and last album recorded with Aki who left the group in 2008. It contains six of the seven singles released with Aki and was the group's first album to be released in dual formats.

== Overview ==
MAX's fifth album was originally scheduled to be released on March 20, 2002, but it was scrapped when lead vocalist Mina left the group amid pregnancy. A singles collection was released in its place entitled, Precious Collection 1995–2002 (2002).

The album was a labor of love according to an interview given by the group in Beatfreak magazine prior to its release. They were completely hands-on with the album, from collaborating with songwriters to producing it themselves. MAX worked with Masaru Shimabukuro of the Ryukyuan group, Begin who produced and cowrote two of three Okinawan folk influenced songs featured on the album. MAX also recorded their first English language song, "It's Time to "Shine!"" which opens the album.

Although the group licensed "Melty Love" as an ending theme to the program, Rajikaru, to help promote the album, it failed to make an impact on the market. It is their only original studio album to not debut in the top 10.

== Track listing ==
=== CD ===
#	Title	Songwriters	Time
1.	"The Beginning of Jewel of Jewels"		0:40
2.	"It's Time to "Shine!""	Zooco, K-Muto	3:22
3.	"What's Going On"	Mavie, Miss Monday, Reo	4:44
4.	"Love Screw"	Takeshi Aida, Keiichi Ueno	3:43
5.	"Festa"	Kiichi Yokoyama	3:30
6.	"Aqua"		0:58
7.	"Mirage"	MAX,	5:11
8.	"Nirai Kanai (Kariyushi Remix)"	MAX, S. Castagna, C. Codenotti, E. Somenzi, Ace	4:39
9.	"Kira Kirari"	MAX, Saori Fueda, Masaru Shimabukuro	5:45
10.	"Be With You"	Keiko Yamamoto, Jeff Lynne	4:10
11.	"Eternal White"	Yuji Toriumi, Nana (MAX), Keiichi Ueno	4:34
12.	"Anata wo Omou Hodo"	Tetsuhiko	4:45
13.	"Naughty Boy"	Zooco, K-Muto	3:30
14.	"Melty Love"	Zooco, K-Muto	3:34
15.	"The Closing of Jewel of Jewels"		0:48

=== DVD ===
#	Title	Director	Time
1.	"Eternal White"	Chika Uemura	4:36
2.	"Festa"	Tetsuo Inoue	3:40
3.	"Love Screw"	Ippei Morita	3:56
4.	"Be With You"	Ippei Morita	4:19
5.	"Nirai Kanai"	Ippei Morita	5:10
6.	"Anata wo Omou Hodo"	Ippei Morita	4:50
7.	"Making (Recording & Member's Voice)"		7:56

== Personnel ==
- MAX - vocals, background vocals

== Charts ==
Album - Oricon sales chart (Japan)

Release	Chart	Peak position	Sales total
22 February 2006	Oricon Weekly Albums Chart	53	5,607

Singles - Oricon sales chart (Japan)

Release	Single	Chart	Peak position
20 November 2002	"eternal white"	Oricon Weekly Singles Chart	20
12 March 2003	"Festa"	Oricon Weekly Singles Chart	32
6 August 2003	"LOVE SCREW"	Oricon Weekly Singles Chart	39
30 June 2004	"Be with You"	Oricon Weekly Singles Chart	34
6 July 2005	"NIRAI KANAI"	Oricon Weekly Singles Chart	38
30 November 2005	"Anata wo Omou Hodo"	Oricon Weekly Singles Chart	53
