= Festa (song) =

Single by MAX

from the album Jewel of Jewels
- B-side: "Stay"
- Released: March 12, 2003
- Genre: Pop
- Length: 15:54
- Label: Avex Trax
- Songwriter: Kiichi Yokoyama

MAX singles chronology
"Eternal White" (2002)	"Festa" (2003)	"Love Screw" (2003)

"Festa" is MAX's 25th single on the Avex Trax label. It is their second single to be released in a copy-protected format. The title track was used as the commercial song for Ebara's line of salad dressing products, Goma Shiburi Kaori no Dressing. The group appeared in a series of commercials for the brand, although not all of them featured "Festa."

== Track list ==
#	Title	Songwriters	Time
1.	"Festa"	Kiichi Yokoyama	3:30
2.	"Stay"	Kiichi Yokoyama	4:30
3.	"Festa (Instrumental)"	KKiichi Yokoyama	3:30
4.	"Stay (Instrumental)"	Kiichi Yokoyama	4:28

== Production ==
=== Music ===
- Recording Director: Motohiko Kohno
- Mixing: Kohji Morimoto
- Recording: Shigeki Kashii, Takahiro Mikami, Junichi Hourin
- Mastering: Shigeo Miyamoto

=== Artwork ===
- Art direction: Shinichi Hara
- Design: Tomokazu Suzuki
- Photography: Zigen
- Styling: Akarumi Someya
- Hair & Make-up: Maki Tawa
- Costume support: Gals Ville, Lauren Hills, XOXO kiss kiss, Esperanza

== Charts ==
Oricon Sales Chart (Japan)

Release	Chart	Peak position
12 March 2003	Oricon Weekly Singles Chart	32
