= Be MAX =

Studio album by MAX
- Released: September 8, 2010
- Recorded: 2010
- Genres: J-pop; Eurobeat
- Length: 60:34
- Language: Japanese
- Label: Sonic Groove
- Producer: MAX

MAX chronology
| New Edition: Maximum Hits (2008) | Be MAX (2010) | avex archives COMPLETE BEST MAX (2010) |

Singles from Be MAX
- 1. "Cat's Eye" Released: May 12, 2010

Alternate cover
- CD+DVD cover

Be MAX is a cover album by Japanese vocal group MAX. Released on September 8, 2010, by Sonic Groove as part of the group's 15th anniversary celebration, the album was offered in two editions: CD only and CD with bonus DVD. It features the group's Eurobeat covers of 15 popular J-pop songs from the 1970s, 1980s, and 1990s. The CD only release includes the bonus track "Tora Tora Tora" (15th Anniversary Mix).

The album peaked at No. 19 on Oricon's weekly albums chart.

== Track listing ==
CD
| No. | Title | Lyrics | Music | Original artist | Length |
|---|---|---|---|---|---|
| 1. | "Samishii Nettaigyo" ((淋しい熱帯魚; "Lonely Tropical Fish")) | Neko Oikawa | Masaya Ozeki | Wink | 3:57 |
| 2. | "Asia no Junshin" (Ajia no Junshin (アジアの純真; "True Asia")) | Yōsui Inoue | Tamio Okuda | Puffy | 3:53 |
| 3. | "Ryūsei no Saddle" (Ryūsei no Sadoru (流星のサドル; "Shooting Star Saddle")) | Masumi Kawamura | Toshinobu Kubota | Toshinobu Kubota | 4:45 |
| 4. | "Itoshisa to Setsunasa to Kokoro Zuyosa to" ((恋しさとせつなさと心強さと; "Of the Beloved, of Sadness, of Responsibility")) | Tetsuya Komuro | Komuro | Ryōko Shinohara with t.komuro | 4:36 |
| 5. | "Donna Toki mo" ((どんなときも。; "Any Time.")) | Noriyuki Makihara | Makihara | Noriyuki Makihara | 4:07 |
| 6. | "Dancing Hero (Eat You Up)" (Danshingu Hīrō (ダンシング・ヒーロー(Eat You Up))) | Hitoshi Shinohara | Angelina Kyte; Anthony Baker | Yōko Oginome | 4:28 |
| 7. | "Cat's Eye" | Yoshiko Miura | Yūichirō Oda | Anri | 3:34 |
| 8. | "Touch" (Tatchi (タッチ)) | Chinfa Kan | Hiroaki Serizawa | Yoshimi Iwasaki | 4:07 |
| 9. | "Zankoku na Tenshi no Tēze" ((残酷な天使のテーゼ; "A Cruel Angel's Thesis")) | Oikawa | Hidetoshi Satō | Yoko Takahashi | 4:22 |
| 10. | "Natsu no Tobira" ((夏の扉; "Summer Door")) | Miura | Kazuo Zaitsu | Seiko Matsuda | 4:14 |
| 11. | "Friends" (Furenzu (フレンズ)) | Nokko | Akio Dobashi | Rebecca | 4:18 |
| 12. | "Desire (Jōnetsu)" ((DESIRE -情熱-)) | Yoko Aki | Kisaburō Suzuki | Akina Nakamori | 4:32 |
| 13. | "Cha-Cha-Cha" | Yūji Konno; B. Graziella | B. Reitano; B. Rosellini; F. Baldoni; F. Reitano | Akemi Ishii | 3:11 |
| 14. | "Waku Waku Sasete" ((WAKU WAKUさせて; "Excite Me More")) | Takashi Matsumoto | Kyōhei Tsutsumi | Miho Nakayama | 3:30 |
| 15. | "Gakuen Tengoku" ((学園天国; "School Heaven")) | Yū Aku | Daisuke Inoue | Finger 5 | 3:43 |
| Total length: | | | | | 60:34 |

CD only bonus track
| No. | Title | Lyrics | Music | Original artist | Length |
|---|---|---|---|---|---|
| 16. | "Tora Tora Tora" (15th Anniversary Mix) | Kazumi Suzuki | Bratt Sinclaire; Tiger Boys | MAX | 5:43 |

DVD
| No. | Title | Length |
|---|---|---|
| 1. | "Donna Toki mo" (Music Clip) |
| 2. | "Donna Toki mo" (Music Clip Making) |
| 3. | "Cat's Eye Live Introduction" |

== Charts ==
| Chart (2010) | Peak position |
|---|---|
| Japanese Albums (Oricon) | 19 |
