= Moonlight (MAX song) =

Single by MAX

from the album Precious Collection 1995–2002
- B-side: "Paradise Lost"
- Released: September 27, 2001
- Genre: Pop
- Length: 3:04
- Label: Avex Trax
- Songwriters: Shungo., Matt Bronleewe, Keri Kimel
- Producer: Max Matsuura

MAX singles chronology
"Perfect Love" (2001)	"Moonlight" (2001)	"Feel So Right" (2001)

"Moonlight" is MAX's 21st single on the Avex Trax label and was released on September 27, 2001. The title track was used as the ending theme to the variety program, Sukiyaki London Boots. Its b-side "Paradise Lost," was used as the theme song to the anime series, Kuru Kuru Amy.

== Track listing ==
#	Title	Songwriters	Time
1.	"Moonlight"	Shungo., Matt Brownleewe, Keri Kimel	3:40
2.	"Paradise Lost"	Shungo., Pete Kirtley, Tim Hawes, Liz Winstanley	4:12
3.	"Moonight (Instrumental)"	Brownleewe, Kimel	3:40
4.	"Paradise Lost (Instrumental)"	Kirtley, Hawes, Winstanley	4:10

== Charts ==
Oricon sales chart (Japan)

Release	Chart	Peak position	Sales total
September 27, 2001	Oricon Weekly Singles Chart	13	27,540
