= Love Screw =

Single by MAX

from the album Jewel of Jewels
- B-side: "Don't Call Me"
- Released: August 6, 2003
- Genre: Pop
- Length: 13:42
- Label: Avex Trax
- Songwriters: Takeshi Aida, Keiichi Ueno

MAX singles chronology
"Festa" (2003)	"Love Screw" (2003)	"Be with You" (2004)

"Love Screw" is MAX's 26th single on the Avex Trax label.

== Track listing ==
#	Title	Songwriters	Time
1.	"Love Screw"	Takeshi Aida, Keiichi Ueno	3:45
2.	"Don't Call Me"	DJ Pine, Yasushi Sasamoto	3:09
3.	"Love Screw (Instrumental)"	Keiichi Ueno	3:45
4.	"Don't Call Me (Instrumental)"	Yasushi Sasamoto	3:06

== Charts ==
Oricon sales chart (Japan)

Release	Chart	Peak position	Sales total
August 6, 2003	Oricon Weekly Singles Chart	39	6,276
