= Larger than Life (Backstreet Boys song) =

1999 single by Backstreet Boys

Single by Backstreet Boys

from the album Millennium
- B-side: "If You Knew What I Knew"
- Released: September 7, 1999
- Recorded: November 1998
- Studio: Cheiron (Stockholm, Sweden)
- Genre: Dance-pop; pop rock
- Length: 3:52
- Label: Jive
- Songwriters: Brian Littrell; Kristian Lundin; Max Martin
- Producers: Kristian Lundin; Max Martin; Rami

Backstreet Boys singles chronology
"I Want It That Way" (1999)	"Larger than Life" (1999)	"Show Me the Meaning of Being Lonely" (1999)

Music video
- "Larger than Life" on YouTube

"Larger than Life" is a song by American boy band Backstreet Boys from their third studio album, Millennium (1999). It was released on September 7, 1999, as the second single from the album. It was written by band member Brian Littrell with Max Martin and Kristian Lundin, who also produced the song along with Rami Yacoub. The song is a "thank you" for their fans' encouragement and devotion. Music critics praised its memorable melody, singalong lyrics, and the band's vocal performance. It was also on Blender's list of the 500 Greatest Songs Since You Were Born.

Commercially, the song became a top-10 hit in over 14 countries. The song became the band's eighth consecutive top-five single in the United Kingdom, peaking at number five in October 1999. The music video, directed by Joseph Kahn, is the 18th-most-expensive music video as of 2024, with estimated production costs of over $2,100,000 (equivalent to $4,058,630 in 2025). It also broke the record for longest-running number one on MTV's Total Request Live.

== Background ==
"Larger than Life" was written and composed sometime in 1998 by group member Brian Littrell. When the group traveled to Sweden in early November 1998 to record at Cheiron Studios, alterations and additions were later made to the lyrics by the producers Max Martin and Kristian Lundin. "Larger than Life" was initially registered and copyrighted in December 1998 as an unfinished demo, not being released on Millennium preview snippets.

Before February 1999, to traditionally follow up the template of releasing upbeat numbers as lead singles (i.e., "We've Got It Goin' On," "Everybody (Backstreet's Back)"), "Larger than Life" was intended as the first single from the upcoming album. However, the decision changed upon hearing the completed version of "I Want It That Way" in a meeting with Max Martin and Andreas Carlsson in February 1999. Thus, plans were canceled, and "Larger than Life" was later released as the second single.

== Composition and lyrics ==
"Larger than Life" was written by band member Brian Littrell, with additional lyrics by Max Martin and Kristian Lundin. Lundin also produced the song, while Martin and Rami Yacoub produced its "Video Mix" version. The song opens with a boisterous talkbox and AJ McLean’s maniacal "yeah," setting an exhilarated tone. Brian Littrell and Nick Carter start singing, "I may run and hide/When you're screamin’ my name alright/But let me tell ya now there are prices to fame alright." In the chorus, they sing about how having legions of fans have changed their lives, "All you people, can't ya see, can't ya see/How your love's affecting our reality/Every time we're down/You can make it right/And that makes you larger than life." "Larger than Life" is in the key of C minor and its very closely relative key, C Dorian (for the verses).

== Critical reception ==
Stephen Thomas Erlewine of AllMusic, during his review for Millennium, picked the song as a highlight from the album, while in its review for The Hits: Chapter One, he wrote that "it may be more tied to its era, but "Larger than Life" is infectious pop nonetheless." Jim Farber of Entertainment Weekly wrote that the song casts "fans as the superhuman force in the exchange between listener and star."

Emily Exton of VH1 listed the song at number 16 on The 20 Best Backstreet Boys Songs list, writing: "Such an introspective look at 'the prices of fame' surely deserves a second chapter dedicated to the social media era. Now that we’re older, can Nick please reveal the 'other' way he wishes he could thank us?." Danielle Sweeney of The Celebrity Cafe listed the song at number 5 on the Top 10 Backstreet Boys Songs list, writing that, "This song was BSB’s dedication to all their loyal (and admittedly crazy) fans. Also, it contained the lyric, 'Looking at the crowd and I see your body sway, c'mon / Wishin' I could thank you in a different way, c’mon' which gave fans everywhere the tiniest glimmer of hope."

== Commercial performance ==
"Larger than Life" was successful in most countries it charted in. In Australia, the song debuted at number 3, becoming their highest debut on the ARIA Charts, until "Incomplete", which debuted at number one in 2005. In its second week, the song fell to number 7 until it reached number 3, its peak position, again, in its third week. It was certified platinum by the Australian Recording Industry Association, for selling over 70,000 copies. In Finland, "Larger than Life" was Backstreet Boys' highest-charting single, debuting and peaking at number 2. The song became the band's eighth consecutive top-five single in the United Kingdom, peaking at number 5 on October 30, 1999.

In New Zealand, the song peaked at number 11, while in Austria, the song peaked at number 15. In France, the song reached number 58. In the United States, the song peaked at number 25 on the Billboard Hot 100 chart. However, the song peaked at number 6 on the Top 40 Mainstream chart. It also reached number 5 in Canada.

== Music video ==
=== Background ===
The video was shot in Universal Studios during August 1999, in Orlando, Florida. The music video for "Larger than Life" was a big-budget production directed by Joseph Kahn, who also directed "Everybody (Backstreet's Back)" video in June 1997. The video takes place in a futuristic space setting and includes elaborate special effects and animation, as well as a breakdown with a dance number. It was inspired by some sci-fi movies such as Alien, Blade Runner and the Star Wars saga.

=== Synopsis ===
The video opens with a long pass of a spaceship over the top of the camera as several of the band's past singles cycle through as if on a radio dial. At the same time, a clock turns to the year 3000. A robot, whose face is portrayed by Antonio Fargas, who played the driver in the "Everybody" video, awakens the band members from their sleep in pods on the ship. Each of the band members is subsequently featured in their separate vignettes (Carter is with the robots, Kevin Richardson is the space fighter, Howie Dorough is with the dancers, Littrell is fighting with a virus, and McLean is retrieving boxes of information) while being shown together on a large stage doing a dance routine with backing dancers. A breakdown was added to the remix version of the song before the final choruses for the extended dance sequence that continues to the end of the song. The vignettes are intercut with the dance sequence following the breakdown.

=== Reception ===
John Hamilton of Idolator listed the video at number 3 on their 10 Best Music Videos from the TRL Era list, writing that, "Showing that they hadn’t lost the funk after all those slow-to-mid-tempo jams, the BSBs busted out this uplifting tribute to their fans, which served as the second single off 1999′s Millennium. Predictably, they scored another TRL chart-topper and sparked an international panty-melting situation."

== Track listings ==
US 2×12-inch vinyl

A1. "Larger than Life" (Keith Litman club mix) – 6:03
A2. "Larger than Life" (Jazzy Jim Bonus Beats) – 3:44
B1. "Larger than Life" (extended video mix) – 4:14
B2. "Larger than Life" (Keith Litman dub) – 9:16
C1. "Larger than Life" (Jazzy Jim Streetshow Mix) – 4:05
C2. "Larger than Life" (Jack D. Elliot club mix) – 5:48
C3. "Larger than Life" (album version) – 3:52
D1. "Larger than Life" (Eclipse's New Life Mix) – 8:47
D2. "Larger than Life" (Madgroove Progressive Mix) – 8:36

UK CD1

1. "Larger than Life" (The Video Mix) – 3:56
2. "Larger than Life" (Eclipse New Life Mix) – 8:42
3. "If You Knew What I Knew" – 5:03

UK CD2

1. "Larger than Life" (The Video Mix) – 3:56
2. "Larger than Life" (The Video Mix instrumental) – 3:56 (misprint, the track is the regular instrumental)
3. "If You Knew What I Knew" – 5:03

== Charts ==
=== Weekly charts ===
Chart (1999–2000)	Peak position
Australia (ARIA)	3
Austria (Ö3 Austria Top 40)	15
Belgium (Ultratop 50 Flanders)	12
Belgium (Ultratop 50 Wallonia)	12
Canada (Nielsen Soundscan)	5
Canada Top Singles (RPM)	5
Canada Adult Contemporary (RPM)	7
Canada Dance/Urban (RPM)	21
Canada CHR (Nielsen BDS)	1
Croatia (HRT)	6
Estonia (Eesti Top 20)	5
Europe (Eurochart Hot 100)	5
Europe (European Hit Radio)	6
Finland (Suomen virallinen lista)	2
Finland Airplay (Radiosoittolista)	17
France (SNEP)	58
Germany (GfK)	5
Hungary (Mahasz)	1
Iceland (Íslenski Listinn Topp 40)	19
Ireland (IRMA)	9
Italy (FIMI)	5
Italy (Musica e dischi)	6
Japan (Oricon)	41
Netherlands (Dutch Top 40)	5
Netherlands (Single Top 100)	6
New Zealand (Recorded Music NZ)	11
Norway (VG-lista)	5
Scottish Singles Sales (Official Charts)	8
Spain (Promusicae)	6
Spain Airplay (Top 40 Radio)	3
Sweden (Sverigetopplistan)	4
Switzerland (Schweizer Hitparade)	10
UK Singles (Official Charts)	5
UK Airplay (Music Week)	26
UK Indie (Official Charts)	2
US Billboard Hot 100	25
US Adult Pop Airplay (Billboard)	35
US Pop Airplay (Billboard)	6
US Rhythmic Airplay (Billboard)	17
US Top 40 Tracks (Billboard)	12

=== Year-end charts ===
Chart (1999)	Position
Australia (ARIA)	26
Belgium (Ultratop 50 Wallonia)	91
Canada Top Singles (RPM)	39
Canada Adult Contemporary(RPM)	88
Europe (Eurochart Hot 100)	49
Europe (European Hit Radio)	49
Germany (Media Control)	75
Italy (Musica e dischi)	62
Netherlands (Dutch Top 40)	14
New Zealand (RIANZ)	23
Romania (Romanian Top 100)	37
Sweden (Hitlistan)	48
UK Singles (OCC)	116
US Mainstream Top 40 (Billboard)	48
US Rhythmic Top 40 (Billboard)	76

Chart (2000)	Position
US Mainstream Top 40 (Billboard)	89

== Certifications ==
Region	Certification	Certified units/sales
Australia (ARIA)	2× Platinum	140,000^{‡}
Canada (Music Canada)	Platinum	80,000^{‡}
Denmark (IFPI Danmark)	Gold	45,000^{‡}
New Zealand (RMNZ)	Gold	15,000^{‡}
Sweden (GLF)	Gold	15,000^{^}
United Kingdom (BPI)	Gold	400,000^{‡}
^{^} Shipments figures based on certification alone.^{‡} Sales+streaming figures based on certification alone.

== Release history ==
Region	Date	Format(s)	Label(s)	Ref.
United States	September 7, 1999	Rhythmic contemporary; contemporary hit radio	Jive	
Japan	September 29, 1999	CD	Jive	
United Kingdom	October 18, 1999	CD; cassette	Jive	

== MAX version ==
"Barairo no Hibi"

Single by MAX

from the album Emotional History
- B-side: "Wired"
- Released: 2000
- Genre: Pop
- Length: 3:54
- Label: Avex Trax
- Songwriters: Yuko Ebine, Max Martin, Kristian Lundin, Brian Littrell
- Producer: Max Matsuura

MAX singles chronology
"Magic" (2000)	"Barairo no Hibi" (2000)	"Always Love" (2001)

"Barairo no Hibi" (バラ色の日々) is a Japanese-language cover of "Larger than Life" by Japanese girl group MAX. The song is their 18th single and fourth from their album Emotional History (2001). It features an additional writing credit from Yuko Ebine, who wrote completely new lyrics for the song. Upon release it peaked at number 11 breaking MAX's string of consecutive top 10 singles beginning with "Seventies" in 1996.

First press copies of the single came with a bonus track: "Barairo no Hibi (Bless Beat Mix)".

=== Track listing ===
No.	Title	Writer(s)	Length
1.	"Barairo no Hibi"	Yuko Ebine, Max Martin, Kristian Lundin, Brian Littrell	3:54
2.	"Wired"	Akira	4:49
3.	"Barairo no Hibi" (Instrumental)	Martin, Lundin, Litrell	3:53
4.	"Wired" (Instrumental)	Akira	4:47

=== Charts ===
Oricon Weekly Singles Chart
Peak	First week	Total	Chart run
11	45,630	74,920	5

=== Personnel ===
- Executive producer: Johnny Taira
- Produced by Max Matsuura
- Co-produced by Junichi "Randy" Tsuchiya
- Chief director: Vanity Maekawa
- Director: Toshio Fujiwara
- Assistant director: Kenichiro Kimura
- Mixed and recorded by Shinichi Usui
- Recorded by Yasushi Shiota
- Mastered by Yuka Koizumi
- Promotion: Takashi Kasuga, Yukio Takemura, Akira Kobayashi, Seiji Fukugawa

=== Art direction and design ===
- Art direction and design: Katsuhito Tadokoro
- Photography: Sunao Ohmori
- Stylist: Akarumi Someya
- Hair & make-up: Maki Tawa
- Creative coordinator: Hayato Mori

== Covers, parodies, and usage in media ==
The song is featured in the 2004 comedy film Napoleon Dynamite.

It also appears in the 2019 Max Martin jukebox musical & Juliet. The song appears as the first song of Act 1 performed by William Shakespeare and the company. It also plays in the teaser trailer for the Disney/Pixar movie, Turning Red.
