= Feel So Right =

Single by MAX

from the album Precious Collection 1995–2002
- B-side: "Manatsu no Eve"
- Released: December 5, 2001
- Recorded: Folio Studio, Studio Fine
- Genre: Pop
- Length: 15:08
- Label: Avex Trax
- Songwriters: Yuko Ebine, Charlie King, Ari Lehtonen, George Cole
- Producer: Max Matsuura

MAX singles chronology
"Moonlight" (2001)	"Feel So Right" (2001)	"Spring Rain" (2002)

"Feel So Right" is MAX's 22nd single on the Avex Trax label and was released on December 5, 2001. The title track was used as the first ending theme to anime series, Captain Tsubasa: Road to 2002. MAX performed the song on their fifth appearance on NHK singing contest, Kōhaku Uta Gassen.

== Track listing ==
#	Title	Songwriters	Time
1.	"Feel So Right"	Yuko Ebine, Charlie King, Ari Lehtonen, George Cole	3:59
2.	"Manatsu no Eve"	Shungo., Lee Bennett, Chris Ballard, Andrew Murray	3:36
3.	"Feel So Right (Instrumental)"	Charlie King, Ari Lehtonen, George Cole	3:59
4.	"Manatsu no Eve (Instrumental)"	Lee Bennett, Chris Ballard, Andrew Murray	3:36

== Production ==
=== Music ===
- Executive producer - Johnny Taira
- Producer - Max Matsuura
- Co-producer - Junichi "Randy" Tsuchiya
- Mixing - Hiroto Kobayashi
- Mastering - Shigeo Miyamoto

Feel So Right

- Arrangement - Cobra Endo
- Programming - David Huff, Cobra Endo
- Guitars - Dave Cleveland
- Chorus - Yumi Kawamura

Manatsu no Eve

- Arrangement - Takehiro Kawabe
- Programming - Takehiro Kawabe
- Guitars - Takehiro Kawabe
- Chorus - Yumi Kawamura

=== Art direction & design ===
- Art direction & design - Katsuhiro Tadokoro
- Photography - Zigen
- Stylist - Akarumi Someya
- Hair & make-up - Keiichi
- Coordinator - Naoki Ueda

== Charts ==
Oricon sales chart (Japan)

Release	Chart	Peak position	Sales total
February 20, 2002	Oricon Weekly Singles Chart	17	24,030
