= Emotional History =

Studio album by MAX
- Released: March 14, 2001
- Recorded: 1999–2001
- Genre: Pop, R&B
- Length: 58:49
- Label: Avex Trax
- Producer: MAX

MAX chronology
Super Eurobeat presents Hyper Euro Max (2000)	Emotional History (2001)	Precious Collection 1995–2002 (2002)

Singles from Emotional History
- 1. "Isshoni..." Released: November 25, 1999; 2. "Never Gonna Stop It" Released: February 16, 2000; 3. "Magic" Released: May 24, 2000; 4. "Barairo no Hibi" Released: September 6, 2000; 5. "Always Love" Released: February 15, 2001

Emotional History is MAX's fourth original studio album on original label, Avex Trax. The album comes three years after the release of their last studio album, Maximum Groove in 1998. It is their first album to contain songs written by the group themselves. The first track of the album, "But My Love" is a cover of a song by Key of Life and is credited to M&I. M&I is a collaboration between MAX and Issa of the group Da Pump who raps on the song. First press copies of the album came with a bonus track, "Always Love (Groove That Soul Mix)" remixed by GTS.

== Track listing ==
#	Title	Songwriters	Time
1.	"But My Love" / M&I	Yusuke Sakamoto, Gaku	5:46
2.	"Always Love""	Hiromi Mori, T2ya	4:36
3.	"Lovin' All Night"	Kentaro Akutsu	4:04
4.	"Crazy In My Love"	Kentaro Akutsu	3:30
5.	"Never Gonna Stop It"	MAX, Chino, Katsu, Yasushi Sasamoto	4:42
6.	"Whispers"	Chihiro Close, Akira	4:04
7.	"Necessary"	Kazuhiro Hara, Kentaro Akutsu	4:38
8.	"Barairo no Hibi"	Yuko Ebine, Max Martin, Kristian Lundin, Brian Litrell	3:52
9.	"Isshoni..."	Pipeline Project	5:16
10.	"Get Ready?"	Hiromi Mori, Yasushi Sasamoto	4:23
11.	"So Tight"	Chihiro Close, Rod Antoon	5:06
12.	"Magic"	Rie Matsumoto, Yasushi Sasamoto	3:46
13.	"Mum"	MAX, Chihiro Close, Yasushi Sasamoto	5:15

== Charts ==
Album – Oricon sales chart (Japan)

Release	Chart	Peak position	Sales total
March 14, 2001	Oricon Weekly Albums Chart	8	107,950

== Personnel ==
- Minako Inoue – vocals
- Ritsuko Matsuda – vocals
- Nanako Takushi - vocals
- Reina Miyauchi - vocals
