= Get My Love! =

Single by MAX

from the album Maximum
- B-side: "Broken Heart"
- Released: October 9, 1996
- Genre: Eurobeat
- Length: 3:45
- Label: Avex Trax
- Songwriter(s): Yuko Ebine, Syrups
- Producer(s): Max Matsuura

MAX singles chronology
"Seventies" (1996)	"Get My Love!" (1996)	"Give me a Shake" (1997)

"Get My Love!" is a song by Japanese dance unit, MAX. It is a Japanese cover of "Take My Gum" by Italo disco artist, Dolly Pop. It was composed by Syrups with Japanese lyrics written by Yuko Ebine and was released as the fifth and final single from their debut album, Maximum (1996). Upon release the song debuted and peaked at #4, becoming the group's first top 5 single.

Until 2005's "Nirai Kanai," the song was the last Eurobeat song by the group to be released as a single.

== Track listing ==
#	Title	Songwriters	Time
1.	"Get My Love!"	Yuko Ebine, Syrups	3:45
2.	"Broken Heart"	Suzuki, Groove Surfers	3:46
3.	"Get My Love!" (Original Karaoke)	Syrups	3:45
4.	"Broken Heart" (Original Karaoke)	Groove Surfers	3:44
