= Spring Rain (MAX song) =

Single by MAX

from the album Precious Collection 1995–2002
- B-side: "Party Tune"
- Released: February 20, 2002
- Recorded: Folio Studio, Studio Fine
- Genre: Pop
- Length: 20:01
- Label: Avex Trax
- Songwriters: Yuka Matsumoto, Kentarou Akutsu

MAX singles chronology
"Feel So Right" (2001)	"Spring Rain" (2002)	"Eternal White" (2002)

"Spring Rain" is MAX's 23rd single on the Avex Trax label and their second ballad single. It was released on February 20, 2002, after the announcement of lead singer Mina's pregnancy and marriage. It was Mina's last single with the group before she was replaced by Aki on their next single, "Eternal White."

== Music video ==
A music video for the single was filmed before the cancellation of MAX's originally-planned fifth studio album. The music video intersperses the four members of MAX singing the song in a white room, with scenes of MAX walking throughout Tokyo, and scenes of Japanese schoolchildren sitting under a cherry blossom tree. The video ends with MAX witnessing a school graduation ceremony, and then fades to black. When the video fades back in after a few seconds, the track list of MAX's second greatest hits album, Precious Collection 1995–2002, rolls in the style of the closing credits of a feature film, accompanying an instrumental piano version of the song, this time with a much slower tempo than the original version.

== Track list ==
#	Title	Songwriters	Time
1.	"Spring Rain"	Yuka Matsumoto, Kentarou Akutsu	5:01
2.	"Party Tune"	Yuka Matsumoto, Masato Hiraide	5:01
3.	"Spring Rain (Instrumental)"	Kentarou Akutsu	5:01
4.	"Party Tune (Instrumental)"	Masato Hiraide	4:59

== Production ==
=== Music ===
Spring Rain

- Arrangement - H-Wonder
- Guitars - Nozomi Fukukawa
- Background vocals - Yuko Ohtani
- Recording - Kenichi Nakamura, Masayuki Nakano
- Mixing - Kenichi Nakamura

Party Tune

- Arrangement - Masato Hiraide
- Bass - Kitaro Nakamura
- Background vocals - Yuko Ohtani
- Recording - Kenichi Nakamura, Masayuki Nakano
- Mixing - Masayuki Nakano

=== Art direction & design ===
- Art direction & design - Yoshitaka Sato
- Photography - Ryu Tamagawa
- Stylish - Yasuhiro Watanabe
- Hair - Taku
- Make-up - Masaki Tanishige
- Coordinator - Taizou Yasumoto

== Charts ==
Oricon sales chart (Japan)

Release	Chart	Peak position	Sales total
February 20, 2002	Oricon Weekly Singles Chart	28	19,530
