= Always Love =

Single by MAX

from the album Emotional History
- B-side: "Just Wanna Lovin' You"
- Released: February 15, 2001
- Genre: Pop
- Length: 4:35
- Label: Avex Trax
- Songwriters: Hiromi Mori, T2ya
- Producer: Max Matsuura

MAX singles chronology
"Barairo no Hibi" (2000)	"Always Love" (2001)	"Perfect Love" (2001)

"Always Love" is a song by Japanese pop group, MAX. It was released as their 19th single and was used as the ending theme to the NTV program, Sports Max. It is the last of five singles leading up to their fourth original studio album, Emotional History (2001). The song was written by Hiromi Mori who has worked with MAX on their singles, "Shinin'on-Shinin'love and "Love Impact." It was composed by T2ya and is his first production with the group.

== Music video ==
The music video was filmed on January 23, 2001 at Aoyama no Bou Studio. It focused almost entirely on the group's dance choreography with solo scenes of each member in various costumes.

== Track listing ==
#	Title	Songwriters	Time
1.	"Always Love"	Hiromi Mori, T2ya	4:35
2.	"Just Wanna Lovin' You"	T2ya	5:07
3.	"Always Love (Instrumental)"	T2ya	4:35
4.	"Just Wanna Lovin' You (Instrumental)"	T2ya	5:05

== Charts ==
Chart	Peak position	First week sales	Total sales
Oricon Weekly Singles Chart	12	32,760	49,790

== Personnel ==
- Executive producer: Johnny Taira
- Produced by Max Matsuura
- Co-produced by Junichi "Randy" Tsuchiya
- Director: Yukihito Sakakibara
- A&R chief: Vanity Maekawa
- A&R: Toshikazu Sakawa
- Mixed by Naoki Yamada
- Mixed at Planet Kingdom Studio
- Recording engineers: Hiroto Kobayashi
- Computer programmer: T2ya
- Mastered by Toshiya Horiuchi
- Promotion: Takashi Kasuga, Yukio Takemura, Akira Kobayashi, Seij Fukagawa

== Art direction and design ==
- Art direction and design: Katsuhito Tadokoro
- Photography: Sunao Ohmori
- Stylist: Akarumi Someya
- Hair & make-up: Maki Tawa
- Creative coordinator: Naoki Ueda
