= Splash Gold (Natsu no Kiseki)/Prism of Eyes =

"Splash Gold －夏の奇跡－" "Prism of Eyes"

Single by MAX
- Released: August 2, 2006
- Genre: Pop
- Length: 16:50
- Label: Sonic Groove
- Songwriters: Splash Gold - Natsu no Kiseki, Natsumi Watanabe, K-Muto, Zooco; Prism of Eyes - Tatsuji Ueda, Takamitsu Shimazaki

MAX singles chronology
"Anata wo Omou Hodo" (2005)	"Splash Gold －夏の奇跡－" "Prism of Eyes" (2006)	"Rough Cut Diamond" (2009)

Alternative cover
- The cover for the CD edition

"Splash Gold —Natsu no Kiseki— / Prism of Eyes" is MAX's 30th single under the Sonic Groove label. It was released on August 2, 2006, and was their first single to be released as a CD single and CD+DVD single. "Splash Gold -Natsu no Kiseki-" is a mid-tempo pop song with Okinawan folk influences. "Prism of Eyes" was used as the ending theme to Tokusatsu series Madan Senki Ryukendo for episodes 30–39 and is in the style of music used regularly in such programming. It is the last single to feature vocals from former member Aki, before she left the group on August 31, 2008.

== Tentative track listing ==
=== CD ===
#	Title	Songwriters	Time
1.	"Splash Gold -Natsu no Kiseki-"	Natsumi Watanabe, K-Muto, Zooco	4:11
2.	"Prism of Eyes"	Tatsuji Ueda, Takamitsu Shimazaki	4:17
3.	"Splash Gold -Natsu no Kiseki- (Instrumental)"	K-Muto, Zooco	4:11
4.	"Prism of Eyes (Instrumental)"	Takamitsu Shimazaki	4:13

=== DVD ===
#	Title
1.	"Splash Gold -Natsu no Kiseki-" (Music Clip)
2.	"Splash Gold -Natsu no Kiseki-" (Making)

== Charts ==
Oricon sales chart (Japan)

Release	Chart	Peak position	Sales total
30 November 2005	Oricon Weekly Singles Chart	60	2,760
