= Cat's Eye (song) =

1983 single by Anri, covered by MAX in 2010

- Reverse side cover

Single by Anri

from the album Timely!! and Cat's Eye (soundtrack)
- B-side: "Dancing with the Sunshine"
- Released: August 5, 1983
- Length: 3:20
- Label: For Life
- Songwriter: Yoshiko Miura
- Composer: Yuichiro Oda
- Producer: Toshiki Kadomatsu

Anri singles chronology
"Lady Sunshine" (1983)	"Cat's Eye" (1983)	"Kanashimi ga Tomaranai" (1983)

"Cat's Eye" is a song by Japanese pop singer-songwriter Anri. It served as the opening for the anime series of the same name, with the reverse side also featuring the show's ending theme "Dancing with the sunshine". A new version of the song titled "Cat's Eye (New Take)" was included on Anri's studio album Timely!!, released on December 5, 1983. Since then, it has become the theme song for the entire franchise, being included in other adaptations such as the 1997 Cat's Eye film, Lupin the 3rd vs. Cat's Eye and was also used as a leitmotif for the titular trio in City Hunter: Shinjuku Private Eyes and City Hunter: Angel Dust.

Cat's Eye was also notably one of the songs that competed in the 34th edition of the NHK Kōhaku Uta Gassen in 1983, becoming the first theme song from an animated television series to be performed at the event.

== Track listing ==
All lyrics were written by Yoshiko Miura.

7" single
No.	Title	Length
1.	"Cat's Eye"	3:20
2.	"Dancing with the sunshine"	3:30

== Other versions ==
"Cat's Eye -2000-"

Single by Anri

from the album TWIN SOUL
- B-side: "Kiss"
- Released: August 21, 1997
- Length: 4:40
- Label: For Life

Anri singles chronology
"Mō hitotsu no Birthday" (1996)	"Cat's Eye -2000-" (1997)	"Future for You" (1997)

Music video
- "Cat's Eye -2000-" on YouTube

"Cat's Eye 2023"

Single by Anri

from the album Lupin the 3rd vs. Cat's Eye ORIGINAL SOUNDTRACK
- Released: January 27, 2023
- Length: 2:50
- Label: VAP

Anri would re-record the song in 1997 for that year's live-action Cat's Eye film. Anri again would re-record the song in 2023, for Lupin the 3rd vs. Cat's Eye which was released on the same day that the film released.

=== MAX cover ===
"Cat's Eye"

Single by MAX

from the album Be MAX
- Language: Japanese
- B-side: "Arabesque"; "Wonder Woman Returns"
- Released: May 12, 2010
- Recorded: 2010
- Genre: J-pop; Eurobeat
- Label: Sonic Groove
- Composer: Yūichirō Oda
- Lyricist: Yoshiko Miura

MAX singles chronology
"Rough Cut Diamond" (2009)	"Cat's Eye" (2010)	"Tacata" (2013)

"Cat's Eye" is the sole single from Japanese pop group, MAX's album Be MAX. It was released on May 12, 2010, through Avex subsidiary, Sonic Groove. Their version of the song has been given a Eurobeat arrangement, a nod to the group's initial claim to fame. The single is released in two editions, a CD+DVD and an Enhanced CD. The latter includes a digest of a concert filmed on February 27, 2010.

==== Release and promotion ====
Beginning in January, MAX launched a one-night monthly genre themed concert series entitled MAX Monthly Live VIP at Akasaka BLITZ in Tokyo. Media coverage from the event announced that the group was in the midst of recording material for a release in May to coincide with the group's 15th anniversary. In February, the group held a Eurobeat themed concert where they performed "Cat's Eye" for the first time. Online store listings for a new single followed shortly after, but confirmation of "Cat's Eye" as the actually a-side was not confirmed until April 7 by their management company, Vision Factory.

==== Music video ====
A music video for "Cat's Eye" began production on March 23, 2010, over two days in an undisclosed location.

==== Track listing ====
CD single
No.	Title	Length
1.	"Cat's Eye"
2.	"Arabesque (Arabeseque 〜アラベスク〜)"
3.	"Wonder Woman Returns"
4.	"Cat's Eye" (instrumental)
5.	"Arabesque" (instrumental)
6.	"Wonder Woman Returns" (instrumental)

DVD single
No.	Title	Length
1.	"Cat's Eye" (music clip)
2.	"Cat's Eye" (music clip making)

== See also ==
- 1983 in Japanese music
