= Maximum (MAX album) =

Studio album by MAX
- Released: December 11, 1996
- Recorded: 1995–1996
- Genre: Eurobeat
- Length: 50:27
- Label: Avex Trax
- Producer: Max Matsuura

MAX chronology
Maximum (1996)	Maximum II (1996)

Singles from Maximum
- 1. "Koisuru Velfarre Dance ~Saturday night~" Released: May 10, 1995; 2. "Kiss Me Kiss Me, Baby" Released: August 21, 1995; 3. "Tora Tora Tora" Released: February 21, 1996; 4. "Seventies" Released: July 17, 1996; 5. "Get My Love!" Released: October 9, 1996

Maximum is MAX's debut studio album released under Avex Trax. The album consists entirely of Japanese language covers of Eurobeat songs. The album sold more than 1.2 million copies becoming the group's most successful release. It spent 4 non-consecutive weeks at #1. It is also the 15th best-selling album of 1997.

== Track listing ==
#	Title	Songwriters	Time
1.	"Love Love Fire"	Yuko Ebine, Groovesurfers, Giancarlo Pasquini	4:24
2.	"Extasy"	Alberto Contini, Y. Ebine, Groovesurfers	3:37
3.	"Tora Tora Tora"	Andrea Leonardi, Kazumi Suzuki, Tiger Boys	3:49
4.	"So Much In Love"	G. Pasquini, K. Suzuki, Tiger Boys	4:03
5.	"Broken Heart"	A. Contini, G. Pasquini, K. Suzuki, Groovesurfers	3:45
6.	"Because I Need You ~Ai wa Mada Ikiteru Noni~"	A. Contini, Y. Ebine, G. Pasquini, Groovesurfers	3:45
7.	"Reality"	A. Contini, Y. Ebine, G. Pasquini, Groovesurfers	3:26
8.	"Kiss Me Kiss Me, Baby"	G. Pasquini, K. Suzuki, Hinoky Team	3:21
9.	"Summer Time"	G. Pasquini, K. Suzuki, Groovesurfers	3:57
10.	"Koisuru Velfarre Dance ~Saturday night~ (Hyper J-Euro Mix)"	Yasushi Akimoto, Alfredo Pignagnoli, Davide Riva	4:59
11.	"Seventies"	G. Pasquini, K. Suzuki, Groovesurfers	3:50
12.	"Get My Love!"	Y. Ebine, Syrups	3:43
13.	"Stranger in the Night"	Y. Ebine, Groovesurfers	3:48

== Charts ==
Album - Oricon Sales Chart (Japan)

Release	Chart	Peak Position	Sales Total	Chart Run
December 11, 1996	Oricon Weekly Albums Chart	1	1,288,260	27 weeks
December 11, 1996	Oricon Yearly Albums Chart	15	1,288,260	
