= Rough Cut Diamond =

Single by MAX
- B-side: "The Power of Love"
- Released: July 22, 2009
- Genre: Pop
- Length: 5:02
- Label: Sonic Groove
- Songwriters: tetsuhiko; Tomoji Sogawa

MAX singles chronology
"Splash Gold (Natsu no Kiseki)/Prism of Eyes" (2006)	"Rough Cut Diamond" (2009)	"Cat's Eye" (2010)

"Rough Cut Diamond" (ラフカット ダイアモンド, Rafukutto Daiamondo) is MAX's 31st single under the Sonic Groove label. It was released on July 22, 2009 and was MAX's first single in three years. It was also the first single to be released since the departure of Aki and comeback of original lead singer, Mina. The title track was used as the theme song for TV Tokyo drama, Kariyushi Sensei Chibaru.

== Release and promotion ==
The group mentioned plans for a new single in an interview with news publication, Chunichi on December 10, 2008. The single was confirmed on April 25, 2009 by their management company's official website. Media reports announcing a tie-in between MAX and the drama series Kariyushi Sensei Chibaru revealed the title of one of the songs included on the single to be "Rough Cut Diamond". Initial descriptions from online stores stated it would contain four tracks based on two original songs.

During a concert stop in Fukuoka on May 5, the group debuted a new song titled, "The Power of Love". Reina confirmed the inclusion of the new song in the single on her personal blog. On May 30, 2009, the group performed "Rough Cut Diamond" for the first time at the final date of their tour at Kanagawa Kenmin Hall.

The group held several promotional events for the single in Chiba and Osaka where fans could come and watch a free mini concert. Handshake events were held after the mini-concerts and required the purchase of the single for participation.

== Music video ==
The video began production on May 21, 2009 and filmed for two days in an undisclosed studio. The dance routine in the video was choreographed by Fuyuko Kubota. The video was directed by Ippei Morita.

== Track listing ==
=== CD ===
#	Title	Songwriters	Time
1.	"Rough Cut Diamond"	Tetsuhiko, Tomoji Sogawa	5:02
2.	"The Power of Love"	K-Muto, Zooco	4:14
3.	"Rough Cut Diamond (Instrumental)"	Tetsuhiko, Sogawa	5:02
4.	"The Power of Love (Instrumental)"	K-Muto, Zooco	4:09

=== DVD ===
#	Title
1.	Rough Cut Diamond (Music Clip)
2.	Rough Cut Diamond (Music Clip Making)

== Charts ==
Oricon sales chart (Japan)

Release	Daily	Weekly	Sales total
July 22, 2009	13	28	3,342

== Personnel ==
- Art direction: Shinichi Hara, Hirotomi Suzumoto
- Design: Hirotomi Suzumoto
- Photographer: Sunao Ohmori (Secession)
- Stylish: Akemi Mutoh
- Hair: Azuma (Super Sonic)
- Make-up: Mio (Juice)
