= Koisuru Velfarre Dance (Saturday Night) =

"Koisuru Velfarre Dance ~Saturday night~"

Single by MAX

from the album Maximum
- B-side: "Koi Suru Velfarre Dance ~Saturday night~ (Nite Mix)"
- Released: May 10, 1995
- Genre: Eurobeat
- Length: 15:21
- Label: Avex Trax
- Songwriters: Yasushi Akimoto, Alfredo Pignagnoli, Davide Riva
- Producer: Max Matsuura

MAX singles chronology
"Koisuru Velfarre Dance ~Saturday night~" (1995)	"Kiss Me Kiss Me, Baby" (1995)

"Koisuru Velfarre Dance ~Saturday night~" is MAX's debut single released under Avex Trax. It is a Japanese language cover of the song "Saturday Night" released in 1994 by Whigfield. As the song was originally recorded for the opening of Avex's Velfarre club, it was meant to be MAX's only release as the group was created solely for promoting the club. However, following the official demise of their original group Super Monkey's, the group released another single "Kiss Me Kiss Me, Baby" beginning their reign as one of Japan's most successful and enduring girl groups.

== Overview ==
MAX's version of "Saturday Night" although a cover, is not a direct translation of the original Whigfield version. Besides new lyrics, MAX's version contains an entirely new comedic spoken word verse. The "Nite Mix" version that appears as a b-side on the single is closer to the original Whigfield version, although it is sped up. A music video for the song was filmed in the Velfarre night club and features MAX and club-goers performing the same dance routine popularized by Whigfield.

== Track listing ==
#	Title	Songwriters	Time
1.	"Koisuru Velfarre Dance ~Saturday night~ (Raveman Mix)"	Yasushi Akimoto, Alfredo Pignagnoli, Davide Riva	4:58
2.	"Koisuru Velfarre Dance ~Saturday night~ (Nite mix)"	Yasushi Akimoto, Alfredo Pignagnoli, Davide Riva	5:27
3.	"Koisuru Velfarre Dance ~Saturday night~ (Karaoke)"	Alfredo Pignagnoli, Davide Riva	4:57

== Charts ==
Oricon sales chart (Japan)

Release	Chart	Peak position	Sales total
May 10, 1995	Oricon Weekly Singles Chart	91	3,550
