= Perfect Love (MAX song) =

"Moonlight"

Single by MAX

from the album Precious Collection 1995–2002
- B-side: "Paradise Lost"
- Released: May 16, 2001
- Genre: Pop
- Length: 3:04
- Label: Avex Trax
- Songwriter: T2ya
- Producer: Max Matsuura

MAX singles chronology
"Always Love" (2001)	"Moonlight" (2001)	"Moonlight" (2001)

"Perfect Love" is MAX's 20th single on the Avex Trax label and was released on May 16, 2001. The title track was the "Kacchao" commercial song. The song debuted and peaked at #10 on the Oricon charts and is currently their last top 10 single.

"Perfect Love" was to serve as the lead single from their then-upcoming fifth studio album, originally to be released on March 20, 2002. However, due to lead singer Mina's marriage and pregnancy, the album was shelved and replaced with a second greatest hits album, Precious Collection 1995–2002.

== Track listing ==
#	Title	Songwriters	Time
1.	"Perfect Love"	T2ya	4:38
2.	"Bible XX"	T2ya	4:23
3.	"Perfect Love (Instrumental)"	T2ya	4:38
4.	"Bible XX (Instrumental)"	T2ya	4:20

== Production ==
=== Music ===
- Executive producer: Johnny Taira
- Producer: Max Matsuura
- Co-producer: Junichi "Randy" Tsuchiya
- Recording director: Yukihito Sakakibara
- Mixed by Naoki Yamada, Hiroto Kobayashi
- Mixed at Planet Kingdom Studio
- Recording Engineers: Hiroto Kobayashi, Eiji Kameda
- Computer programmer: T2ya
- Mastered by Shigeo Miyamoto

=== Art direction & design ===
- Art direction & design: Katsuhito Tadokoro
- Photography: Kazuyoshi Shimomura
- Stylist: Akarumi Someya
- Hair & Make-up: Maki Tawa
- Coordinated by Shunsuke Emaru, Naoki Ueda

== Charts ==
Oricon sales chart (Japan)

Release	Chart	Peak position	Sales total
May 16, 2001	Oricon Weekly Singles Chart	10	46,130
