= Eternal White =

Single by MAX

from the album Jewel of Jewels
- B-side: "Another Truth"
- Released: 20 November 2002
- Genre: Pop
- Length: 4:35
- Label: Avex Trax
- Songwriters: Yusuke Toriumi, Nana, Keiichi Ueno

MAX singles chronology
"Spring Rain" (2002)	"Eternal White" (2002)	"Festa" (2003)

"Eternal White" is MAX's 24th single on the Avex Trax label. The single was their first after a brief hiatus following the departure of lead singer, Mina in March, 2002. It was also their first single with Aki who joined the group in July, 2002. The title track is a bossa nova influenced winter love song. It features a rap section performed by members Lina and Nana, who also wrote the lyrics. It was their first single to be released in a copy-protected format.

== Track listing ==
#	Title	Songwriters	Time
1.	"Eternal White"	Yusuke Toriumi, Nana, Keiichi Ueno	4:35
2.	"Another Truth"	Mizue, Miki Watabe	3:48
3.	"Eternal White (Instrumental)"	Keiichi Ueno	4:34
4.	"Another Truth (Instrumental)"	Miki Watabe	3:45

== Production ==
=== Music ===
- Recording Director: Kenichi Sakagami, Motohiko Kohno
- Mixing: Kohji Morimoto, Kenichi Nakamura
- Recording: Kenichi Nakamura
- Mastering: Tetsuya Yamamoto

=== Artwork ===
- Art direction: Shinichi Hara
- Design: Tomokazu Suzuki
- Photography: Minoru Ogishima
- Styling: Akemi Muto
- Hair & Make-up: Maki Tawa

== Charts ==
Oricon sales chart (Japan)

Release	Chart	Peak position
20 November 2002	Oricon Weekly Singles Chart	20
