= Tora Tora Tora (song) =

1994 single by Domino

Single by Domino
- Released: 1994
- Genre: Eurobeat
- Length: 6:44
- Label: A-Beat C
- Songwriter: Bratt Sinclaire

Domino singles chronology
"Behind You" (1993)	"Tora Tora Tora" (1994)	"Beat Beat Freak" (1995)

"Tora Tora Tora" is a song by Italian singer Domino, released as a single in 1994. The music was written by Bratt Sinclaire.

Domino recorded a new version in 2020, titled "Tora Tora Tora (Mix 2.0)", produced by Dave Rodgers.

== MAX version ==
"Tora Tora Tora"

Single by MAX

from the album Maximum
- B-side: "So Much In Love"
- Released: February 21, 1996
- Length: 3:46
- Label: Avex Trax
- Songwriters: Kazumi Suzuki, Tiger Boys
- Producer: Max Matsuura

MAX singles chronology
"Kiss Me Kiss Me, Baby" (1995)	"Tora Tora Tora" (1996)	"Seventies" (1996)

The Japanese female vocal group MAX released a Japanese cover on their debut album, Maximum. It was composed by Tiger Boys with Japanese lyrics written by Kazumi Suzuki. It was released as their third single and the original version of the song appears on the albums Maximum Collection (1999), and Precious Collection 1995–2002 (2002). The song is responsible for launching MAX into mainstream stardom, garnering the group their first top 20 single.

In 2005, the group rerecorded the song and released it on their single "Nirai Kanai" as "Tora Tora Tora 2005" to commemorate their tenth anniversary.

In 2022, the group released a digital mini-album "Tora Tora Tora", with all six versions of the song previously released by them, to commemorate the Year Of The Tiger.

=== Track listing ===
#	Title	Songwriters	Time
1.	"Tora Tora Tora"	Kazumi Suzuki, Tiger Boys	3:46
2.	"So Much in Love"	Suzuki, Tiger Boys	4:07
3.	"Tora Tora Tora (Original Karaoke)"	Tiger Boys	3:46
4.	"So Much in Love (Original Karaoke)"	Tiger Boys	4:03

== Other versions ==
- A cover version was made by Cherry, Niko, and The Prophet under the name "Tora Tora Tora 2005". This version was produced by Bratt Sinclaire.
