= Grace of My Heart (song) =

Single by MAX

from the album Maximum Groove
- B-side: "Getting Over"
- Released: September 9, 1998
- Genre: Pop
- Length: 20:47
- Label: Avex Trax
- Songwriters: Yuko Ebine, Kenji Suzuki
- Producer: Max Matsuura

MAX singles chronology
"Ride On Time" (1998)	"Grace of My Heart" (1998)	"Love Impact" (1999)

"Grace of My Heart" is MAX's 11th single released under Avex Trax. The title track was used in commercials for Communicase Gum. Its B-side, "Getting Over" was used in a series of commercials for DyDo Mistio soft drinks including one commercial featuring Namie Amuro. Upon release the single debuted at No. 2, becoming their second highest ranking single behind "Give Me a Shake" which debuted at No. 1.

== Track listing ==
#	Title	Songwriters	Time
1.	"Grace of My Heart"	Yuko Ebine, Kenji Suzuki	5:25
2.	"Getting Over"	Goro Matsui, Kiichi Yokoyama	5:01
3.	"Grace of My Heart (Original Karaoke)"	Kenji Suzuki	5:25
4.	"Getting Over (Original Karaoke)"	Kiichi Yokoyama	4:57

== Charts ==
Oricon sales chart (Japan)

Release	Chart	Peak position	Sales total
September 9, 1998	Oricon Weekly Singles Chart	2	243,260
September 9, 1998	Oricon Yearly Singles Chart	99	
