= Maximum II =

Studio album by MAX
- Released: December 25, 1997
- Recorded: 1997
- Studio: On Air Azabu Studios, Paradise Studios Komazawa, Planet Kingdom, Sunrise Towerside Studio, Studios Sound Dali, Cats Studio, Prime Sound Studio
- Genre: Pop, Dance, R&B
- Length: 1:02:46
- Label: Avex Trax
- Producer: Max Matsuura

MAX chronology
Maximum (1996)	Maximum II (1997)	Maximum Groove (1998)

Singles from Maximum II
- 1. "Give Me a Shake" Released: April 9, 1997; 2. "Love Is Dreaming" Released: July 30, 1997; 3. "Shinin'on-Shinin'love" Released: October 29, 1997

Maximum II is Japanese dance unit, MAX's second album. It was released on December 25, 1997, by record label, avex trax. The album is a departure from their debut effort completely void of the Eurobeat sound that made the group popular instead filled with slick R&B influenced pop numbers and ballads. The album peaked at #2 on the Oricon Albums Chart, but had their best opening sales number with over 700,000 units sold. First pressings of the album included a slipcase and six month calendar.

== Track list ==
#	Title	Songwriters	Time
1.	"Easy Easy"		4:36
2.	"Give me a Shake"		5:31
3.	"Harmony"		4:03
4.	"I will"		5:22
5.	"Really Love Me"		5:00
6.	"Love is Dreaming"		4:49
7.	"Endless Love"		4:46
8.	"I'll Be with You"		5:48
9.	"Nobody else"		4:04
10.	"Shinin'on-Shinin'love"		4:38
11.	"Wonderland"		4:24
12.	"Forever Song"		5:03
13.	"Give me a Shake (Deep Club Mix)"		4:50
