= Maximum Groove =

Studio album by MAX
- Released: December 2, 1998
- Recorded: 1998
- Genre: Pop, dance, R&B
- Length: 1:06:28
- Label: Avex Trax
- Producer: Max Matsuura

MAX chronology
Maximum II (1997)	Maximum Groove (1998)	Maximum Collection (1999)

Singles from Maximum Groove
- 1. "Hikari no Veil" Released: April 22, 1998; 2. "Ride On Time" Released: July 23, 1998; 3. "Grace of My Heart" Released: September 9, 1998

Maximum Groove is the third studio album by Japanese dance unit MAX. It was released on December 2, 1998, by avex trax. It is their second album to peak at the #1 position on the Oricon Weekly Album Charts and has since been certified a million seller by the Recording Industry Association of Japan. It is one of two albums by the group to chart in Oricon's 1999 Year-End album chart along with their first greatest hits compilation, Maximum Collection (1999). It charted at #27. The album was supported by their MAX Live Contact 1999 ~Sunny Holiday~ concert tour.

== Track list ==
#	Title	Songwriters	Time
1.	"Only One"	Yuko Ebine, Hideaki Kuwabara	4:29
2.	"Hikari no Veil"	Goro Matsui, Kiichi Yokoyama	5:01
3.	"I'm In Love"	Hiromi Mori, Masataka Sasamoto	4:24
4.	"Getting Over"	Matsui, Yokoyama	5:00
5.	"Sunny Holiday"	David Toball, Sandro Cajander, TH Olsen, Masato Ota, Jonas Eriksson, Mattias Eliasson	3:42
6.	"Not Alone"	Matsui, Kuwabara	5:12
7.	"Active For The Love"	Matsui, Yasushi Sasamoto	4:43
8.	"Private Crime"	Mori, M. Sasamoto	4:58
9.	"Reborn"	Mori, M. Sasamoto	4:41
10.	"Person I Need"	Mori, M. Sasamoto	5:41
11.	"Grace Of My Heart"	Ebine, Kenji Suzuki	5:24
12.	"Ride On Time"	Matsui, Yokoyama	4:27
13.	"Don't You Love Me"	Kazumi Suzuki, Groove Surfers	4:56
14.	"Love Desire"	Yuko Ebine, Time Machine	3:54

== Chart performance ==
Oricon Weekly Albums Chart
Peak	First week	Total	Chart run
1	322,300	824,370	12

== Certification ==
"Maximum Groove" has been certified million for shipments of over 1,000,000 by the Recording Industry Association of Japan.

== Accolades ==
- Pop Album of the Year - Japan Gold Disc Awards
