= Ride on Time (MAX song) =

Single by MAX

from the album Maximum Groove
- B-side: "Don't You Love Me"
- Released: July 23, 1998
- Genre: Pop, Latin
- Length: 18:21
- Label: Avex Trax
- Songwriters: Gorō Matsui, Kiichi Yokoyama
- Producer: Max Matsuura

MAX singles chronology
"Hikari no Veil" (1998)	"Ride on Time" (1998)	"Grace of My Heart" (1998)

"Ride on Time" is MAX's 10th single released under Avex Trax. The title track and its b-side were used as the opening and ending theme songs to the drama "Sweet Devil" which starred the members of MAX as a group of college women who become cursed after using forbidden magic after getting involved in the case of a serial killer. The single debuted in the top 5 of the Oricon chart upon release and is the group's third best selling single.

== Track listing ==
#	Title	Songwriters	Time
1.	"Ride on Time"	Goro Matsui, Kiichi Yokoyama	4:28
2.	"Don't You Love Me"	Kazumi Suzuki, Groovesurfers	4:44
3.	"Ride on Time (Original Karaoke)"	Kiichi Yokoyama	4:28
4.	"Don't You Love Me (Original Karaoke)"	Groovesurfers	4:41

== Charts ==
Oricon sales chart (Japan)

Release	Chart	Peak position	Sales total
July 23, 1998	Oricon Weekly Singles Chart	4	312,500
July 23, 1998	Oricon Yearly Singles Chart	74	
