= Love Is Dreaming =

Single by MAX

from the album Maximum II
- B-side: "Wonderland"
- Released: July 30, 1997
- Genre: Pop
- Length: 18:29
- Label: Avex Trax
- Songwriter(s): Yuko Ebine, Joey Carbone, Jeff Carruthers, Motsu
- Producer(s): Max Matsuura

MAX singles chronology
"Give Me a Shake" (1997)	"Love Is Dreaming" (1997)	"Shinin'on-Shinin'love" (1997)

"Love Is Dreaming" is MAX's 7th single released under Avex Trax. Both the title song and b-side were originally English songs written by Joey Carbone and Jeff Carruthers entitled, "First Kiss" and "Be Good To Me." They were recorded and released in Japan in 1991 by Singaporean singer, Maizurah. With the help of the original songwriters, a Japanese version of "First Kiss" was rewritten and recorded as "Love Is Dreaming" and "Be Good To Me" was rewritten as "Wonderland." The single debuted and peaked at #4.

== Track listing ==
#	Title	Songwriters	Time
1.	"Love Is Dreaming"	Yuko Ebine, Joey Carbone, Jeff Carruthers, Motsu	4:52
2.	"Wonderland"	Yuko Ebine, Funky Brothers	4:26
3.	"Love Is Dreaming" (Original Karaoke)	Joey Carbone, Jeff Carruthers	4:50
4.	"Wonderland" (Original Karaoke)	Funky Brothers	4:22

== Charts ==
Oricon Sales Chart (Japan)

Release	Chart	Peak position	Sales total
July 30, 1997	Oricon Weekly Singles Chart	4	283,890
