= Nirai Kanai (MAX song) =

"Nirai Kanai" "ニライカナイ"

Single by MAX

from the album Jewel of Jewels
- Released: July 6, 2005
- Genre: Eurobeat
- Length: 25:47
- Label: Sonic Groove
- Songwriters: MAX, S. Castagna, C. Codenotti, E. Somenzi, Ace

MAX singles chronology
| "Be with You" (2004) | "Nirai Kanai" "ニライカナイ" (2005) | "あなたを思うほど" (2005) |

"Nirai Kanai" "(ニライカナイ)" is MAX's 28th single and first under the Sonic Groove label. The single serves as a commemoration of their 10th anniversary and saw the group return to the style that originally made them popular.

== Overview ==
Nirai Kanai, is an Okinawan myth about a magical island off the coast of Okinawa where the gods live. In Okinawa, they believe that the gods come from this island every year to bless their people. This is where MAX drew inspiration for their very own song named after the island. It's a cover of eurobeat vocalist Christine's song "Rain" from the album "Super Eurobeat 168".

MAX announced the release of the single during their 10th anniversary tour in May 2005. Harking back to their beginnings, all the songs selected for the single were based on the Eurobeat style of music. Eurobeat is a style of dance music that originates in Italy. They coined a new term, "Okinawan-Euro" to describe "Nirai Kanai" that takes Eurobeat and combines it with traditional Okinawan flavors. MAX took a major role in the production of this song including writing its lyrics and performing some of the music. Unique to this song is the fact that several lines of the song are not in Japanese, but in their native Okinawan dialect.

The single also includes two b-sides. The first b-side to appear on the single, "Someday" is a cover of eurobeat vocalist Nuage's song "Sunday." The second b-side "Tora Tora Tora 2005" is a self-cover of their first breakout hit. MAX stated that they wanted to rerecord the song because the song had become popular again under a new wave of Para Para dancing. Unlike the original version, each member has solo lines.

== Commercial endorsements ==
The title track was used as the commercial song for Orion Southern Star, a beer beverage. MAX also appeared as spokespersons for the company appearing in commercials and performing in special live events in Okinawa, Japan. MAX and the company enjoyed boosts in popularity during the campaign on the island.

== Music video ==
A video for "Nirai Kanai" was shot on location in Okinawa, Japan. The video involves three scenes. The first scene involves the members of MAX performing on a rock platform built into the ocean. The second scene is just individual shots of the members singing in front of a colored background. The final scene of video, follows MAX as they greet locals on the island.

In an unusual move, the music video was released shortly after the release of the single to major video outlets. Promotion and the general popularity of the song could have been stunted because of this.

== Track listing ==
| # | Title | Songwriters | Time |
|---|---|---|---|
| 1. | "NIRAI KANAI" | MAX, S. Castagna, C. Codenotti, E. Somenzi, Ace | 5:03 |
| 2. | "Someday" | MAX, G. Pasquini, F. Rizzolo, S. Oliva, Dave Rodgers | 4:07 |
| 3. | "TORA TORA TORA 2005 | Kazumi Suzuki, Tiger Boys | 3:46 |
| 4. | "NIRAI KANAI (Instrumental)" | S. Castagna, C. Codenotti, E. Somenzi | 5:03 |
| 5. | "Someday (Instrumental)" | G. Pasquini, F. Rizzolo, S. Oliva | 4:05 |
| 6. | "TORA TORA TORA 2005 (Instrumental)" | Tiger Boys | 3:43 |

== Personnel ==
- MAX - vocals, background vocals

== Production ==
- Art Direction - Shinichi Hara
- Design: Tomokazu Suzuki
- Photography - Satoshi Miyazawa
- Stylist - KOKA
- Hair - YAS
- Make Up - YOSHI.T for MONDO
- Clothing - Emanuel Ungaro

== Charts ==
Oricon sales chart (Japan)

| Release | Chart | Peak position | Sales total |
|---|---|---|---|
| 6 July 2005 | Oricon Weekly Singles Chart | 38 | 6,148 |
