= Seventies (song) =

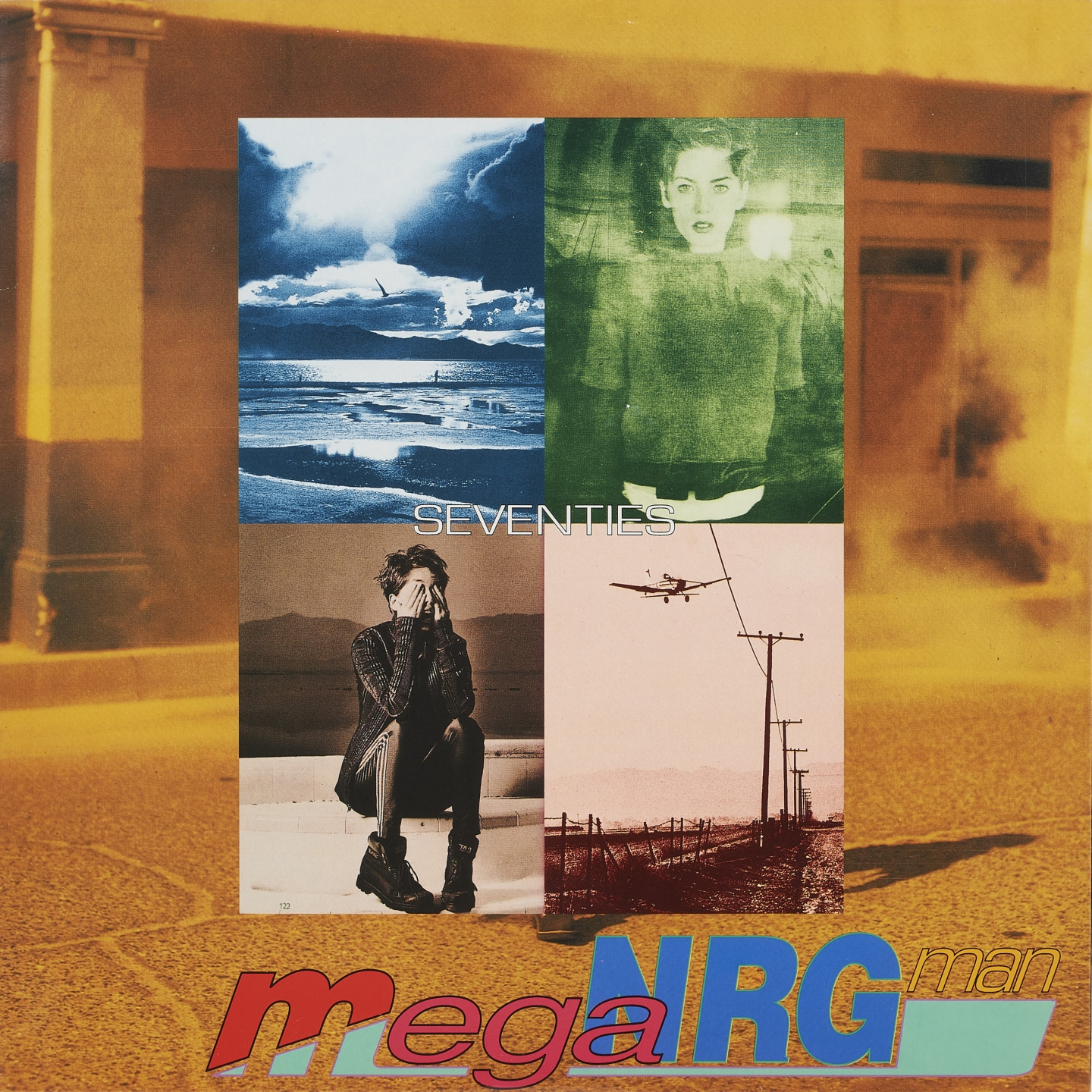

Single by Mega NRG Man

from the album Maharaja Night - Hi-NRG Revolution Vol. 9
- Released: 1993 (Promotional Japanese Vinyl); February 16, 1994 (Italian Single)
- Recorded: 1993
- Studio: Rodgers Studios
- Genre: Eurobeat
- Length: 6:21
- Label: A-Beat-C
- Songwriter: Giancarlo Pasquini
- Composer: Giancarlo Pasquini
- Producer: Dave Rodgers

Mega NRG Man singles chronology
"Fire" (1993)	"Seventies" (1993)	"Flame On The Fire" (1995)

"Seventies" is a 1993 Eurobeat song performed by Tomas Marin under his alias Mega NRG Man. It was written, composed and produced by Giancarlo Pasquini. It was initially released in a promotional vinyl by Avex Trax in 1993, in Japan; and then in a vinyl maxi-single by A-Beat-C, in Italy, on February 16, 1994. It was later included in the compilation album Maharaja Night - Hi-NRG Revolution Vol. 9 and on Mega NRG Man's first studio album, also titled Seventies (1996).

Seventies was covered several times along the years. Dionisious and Steve Tee in 1994, MAX and King & Queen in 1996, Dave Rodgers in 1997 and 2019, and Chris and the Space Girls also in 2019.

== Track listing ==
Side	Title	Time
A.	"Seventies (Extended Mix)"	5:50*
B1.	"Seventies (Bonus Track)"	1:10
B2.	"Seventies (FM Version)"	2:40
B3.	"Seventies (Instrumental)"	2:40
B4.	"Seventies (Last Mix)"	1:10

- It is likely that the length of the extended version was misprinted on the vinyl, since in the digital rip (released in 2021) this one is 6:21.

== MAX version ==
"Seventies"
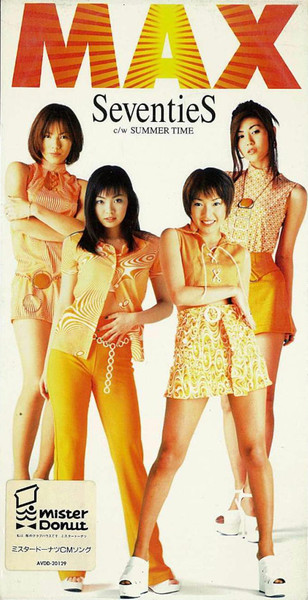

Single by MAX

from the album Maximum
- B-side: "Summer Time"
- Released: July 17, 1996
- Recorded: 1996
- Genre: Eurobeat
- Length: 3:46
- Label: Avex Trax
- Songwriters: Giancarlo Pasquini, Kazumi Suzuki, Groove Surfers
- Producer: Max Matsuura

MAX singles chronology
"Tora Tora Tora" (1996)	"Seventies" (1996)	"Get My Love!" (1996)

"Seventies" is a song by Japanese dance unit, MAX. It is a Japanese cover of Eurobeat artist Mega NRG Man's song of the same name. It was composed by Groove Surfers with Japanese lyrics written by Kazumi Suzuki. It was released as their fourth single and the original version of the song appears on the albums, Maximum (1996), Maximum Collection (1999) and Precious Collection 1995–2002 (2002). It was used in commercials for Japanese brand donuts Mister Donut. It was also the group's first top ten single debuting and peaking at No. 7.

== Track listing ==
Side	Title	Songwriters	Time
1.	"Seventies"	Giancarlo Pasquini, Kazumi Suzuki, Groove Surfers	3:50
2.	"Summer Time"	Pasquini, Suzuki, Groover Surfers	3:58
3.	"Seventies (Original Karaoke)"	Groove Surfers	3:48
4.	"Summer Time (Original Karaoke)"	Groove Surfers	3:56

== Dave Rodgers version ==
"Seventies"

Song by Dave Rodgers

from the album Take Me Higher
- Released: April 23, 1997
- Recorded: 1997
- Studio: Rodgers Studios
- Genre: Eurobeat
- Length: 5:09
- Label: A-Beat-C
- Songwriter: Giancarlo Pasquini
- Composer: Giancarlo Pasquini
- Producer: Dave Rodgers

In 1997, Dave Rodgers made his own version of "Seventies", released on Rodgers' fourth studio album Take Me Higher (1997) on April 23, 1997.

Later in 2019, Rodgers covered the song again, released for his fifth studio album Deja Vu (2019) on December 5, 2019.
