= Give Me a Shake =

"Give Me A Shake"

Single by MAX

from the album Maximum II
- B-side: "Kiss To Kiss"
- Released: April 9, 1997
- Genre: Pop
- Length: 18:40
- Label: Avex Trax
- Songwriters: Yuko Ebine, Yasuhiko Hoshino
- Producer: Max Matsuura

MAX singles chronology
"Get My Love!" (1996)	"Give Me A Shake" (1997)	"Love Is Dreaming" (1997)

"Give Me A Shake" is MAX's 6th single released under Avex Trax. Until the release of this single, all of MAX's music was covers of Italian Eurobeat songs, "Give Me A Shake" is their first original Japanese language song. Upon its release the song debuted at #1 on Oricon weekly charts, becoming their first and only top charting single. The song brought the group their first Japan Record Award grand prix nomination and allowed them to make their first appearance on Kōhaku Uta Gassen.

== Track listing ==
#	Title	Songwriters	Time
1.	"Give Me a Shake"	Yuko Ebine, Yasuhiko Hoshino	5:31
2.	"Kiss to Kiss"	Yuko Ebine, Funky Brothers	3:51
3.	"Give Me a Shake" (Original Karaoke)	Yasuhiko Hoshino	5:31
4.	"Kiss to Kiss" (Original Karaoke)	Funky Brothers	3:47

== Charts ==
Oricon sales chart (Japan)

Release	Chart	Peak position	Sales total
April 9, 1997	Oricon Weekly Singles Chart	1	476,570
April 9, 1997	Oricon Yearly Singles Chart	67	
