= MAX (group) =

Japanese female vocal group

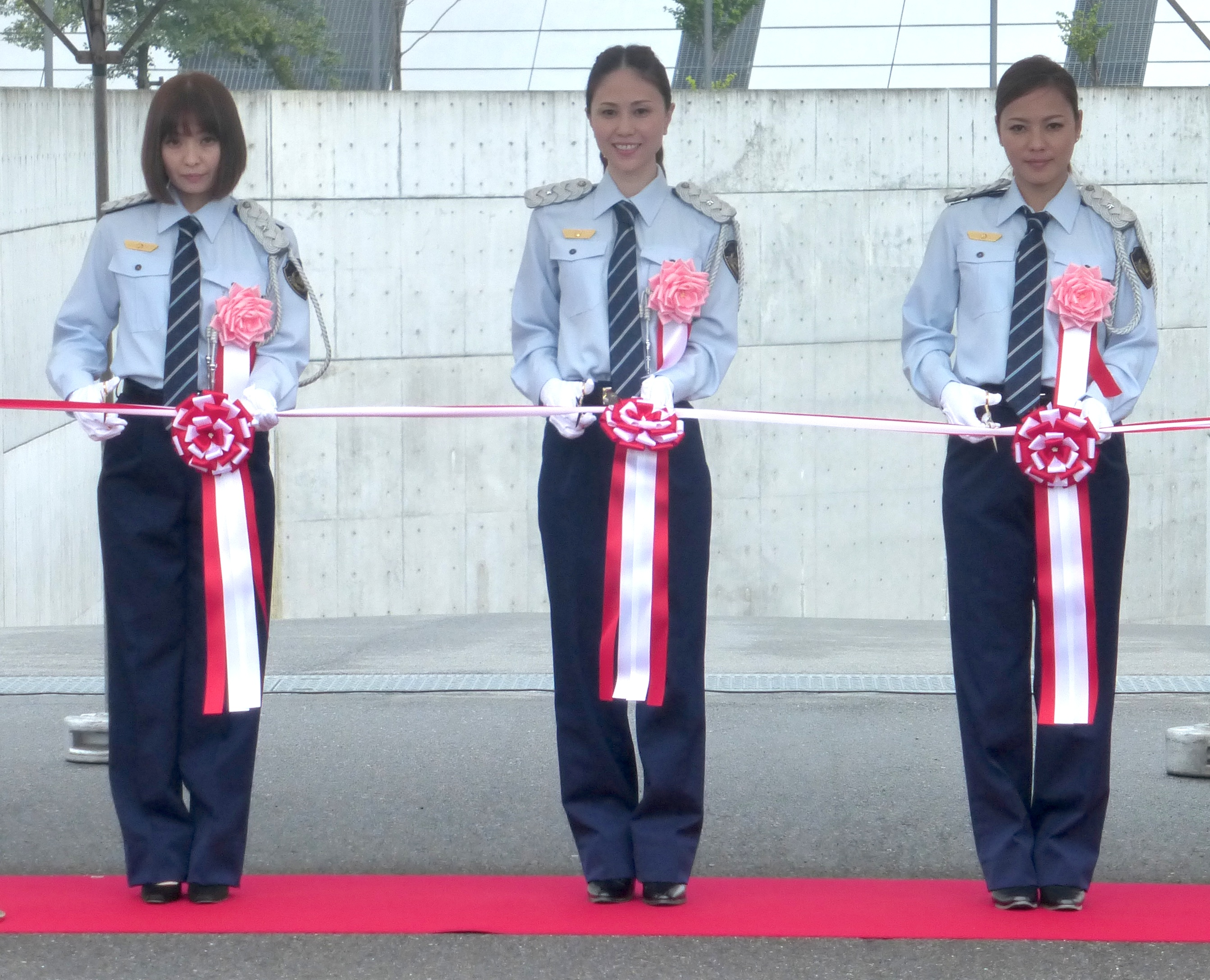
- At Tokyo Detention House, 2016. From left to right: Mina, Nana, Lina.

Background information
- Origin: Okinawa, Japan
- Genres: J-pop; Eurobeat; Dance
- Years active: 1995–present
- Labels: Avex Trax (1995–2005); Sonic Groove (2005–present)
- Spinoff of: Super Monkey's
- Members: Nana (1995–present); Lina (1995–present); Reina (1995–present); Mina (1995–2002); (2008–present)
- Past members: Aki (2002–2008)
- Website: avex.jp/max/

MAX is a Japanese female vocal group. The name is an acronym for "musical active experience". The original members of MAX made their musical debut as members of the Super Monkey's along with lead vocalist Namie Amuro. They branched out on their own in 1995, becoming stars in their own right with selling several million albums and a string of consecutive top 20 singles from 1996 to 2000. Their lead singer, Mina, left the group in 2002 due to pregnancy and was replaced by Aki Maeda who assumed the stage name Aki. Aki left the group in August 2008 to pursue a solo career. Original member Mina returned to the group on October 28, 2008, ushering in the group's comeback after a two-year hiatus.

Since their debut MAX has sold over 10 million records. They are behind only Morning Musume for female group with the most consecutive top 10 singles, tying with Wink at 15.

== Members ==
When the group debuted all members used their real names. Once they became popular they used stage names each possessing the suffix "na." Lina (Ritsuko) used to go by "Rina". However, because of the similarity to "Reina" and the fact that her nickname more closely matched "Lina" anyway, this became her name around the time of their first CD. During informal footage such as backstage of their concerts, Mina and Nana are referred to by their full names, Minako and Nanako. The only member not to take on a stage name with the suffix is former member, Aki.

All members of the group hail from Okinawa Prefecture including their latest member.

=== Current members ===
- Minako Inoue (井上美奈子), known as Mina (b. 29 December 1977)
- Nanako Takushi (沢詩奈々子), known as Nana (b. 25 March 1976)
- Reina Miyauchi (宮内玲奈), known as Reina (b. 6 January 1978)
- Ritsuko Matsuda (松田律子), known as Lina (b. 26 February 1977)

=== Former members ===
- Aki Maeda (前田亜紀), known as AKI (b. 22 October 1980). Before joining MAX, she had made her professional music debut in the short lived group, Hipp's.

== History ==
=== The beginning ===
MAX started off as just a project that was never meant to take off. The group's concept was simple. They were presented as a singing and dancing pop group who performed catchy dance music. In 1995, they released their first single to very little success. Their second single was released to the same fate. The group continued to perform with Namie Amuro under the name, Super Monkey's, until the group officially disbanded in the summer of that year. Even though the Super Monkey's were over, MAX performed as dancers for Namie Amuro throughout the early stages of her solo career until March 1996. The foursome's dual identity as SuperMonkeys and MAX is captured in the video, Amuro Namie First Anniversary Live at Marine Stadium where they performed as Namie's backup singers and dancers, then Namie announces and congratulates them as MAX.

That month, the girls released their first movie, Ladie's MAX and their third single, "Tora Tora Tora", which debuted at #19 giving them their first hit and ending their days as glorified backup dancers.

=== Stardom ===
MAX followed the success of "Tora Tora Tora" with "Seventies" which brought the girls their first top 10 hit. In December 1996, they released their debut album Maximum. The album debuted at #1 and went on to sell over one million copies. Following the success of their album, MAX went back to the big screen in the sequel to their first movie, Ladie's MAX. The theme song to the movie entitled Give me a Shake was the first original song they performed. Before this song, all of MAX's hits were covers of Italian dance music. When the eponymous theme song "Give me a Shake" was released as a single it debuted at #1 garnering the group their first and only #1 hit.

In the fall of 1997, MAX went on their first national tour dubbed J-Pop Gig Tour. Spanning only two months, the group played sold-out halls including the Nippon Budokan. They released their second album, Maximum II on Christmas Day. That album also went on to sell over a million copies. MAX appearing for the first time on Kouhaku Utagassen at the end of 1997 and continued their reign at the top of the music scene throughout 1998. In 1999, MAX released their first greatest hits collection entitled Maximum Collection which also topped the charts. The girls scored a major hit at the end of the year with their first ballad single entitled, "Issho ni." Although the single had charted in the lower half of the top 10, it stayed on the charts for four months selling over 300,000 copies. It would be their second best selling single.

=== Turning Point ===
2000 proved to be a time of change for MAX. For their first single of the new millennium, the girls decided to take control of their music by writing and producing for the first time. Their result, "Never Gonna Stop It", an R&B influence pop number debuted at #8 on the charts. However, the single fell short of sales of 100,000 copies. Since 1999, the group's sales were gradually declining but this was the first time since their third single that any of their singles did not surpass the hundred thousand mark. Their next self-produced effort, "Magic" would debut at #10 but sold less than the previous single. The next few years were more of the same.

The group came to a dramatic standstill when in January 2002, the group's lead singer, Mina, announced her quickie marriage and pregnancy in a press conference at their record label, Avex Trax's main office. At the press conference, the group also announced that Mina would take a hiatus from the group to have her baby. They released their second ballad single, "Spring Rain" the following month to disastrous results. The single charted a lowly #28 breaking their string of 19 consecutive top 20 singles. An original album, their fifth, due for release in March was shelved and instead a second greatest hits collection was released in its place. MAX went into hiatus.

=== Muted Comeback ===
The next few months remained quiet for MAX, until late June when news started circulating around fan websites that flyers announcing a new MAX member were seen. The three remaining members (Nana, Lina and Reina) had previously announced that they would either: 1) continue as a three-member group or 2) remain in hiatus until Mina returned. In either case, they were adamant that no one would replace Mina.

Soon after came the news of an official fanclub meeting in July. On the day of the meeting, a three-member MAX came out to a crowded club performing their #1 smash, "Give me a Shake." Shortly following the performance, MAX confirmed rumors by introducing their new member, Aki Maeda. Aki's position in the band was initially uncertain, rumors were that she was either just a temporary member until Mina's return or upon Mina's return MAX would become a five-member group.

A new single and album were scheduled for release the next month along with TV appearances on some of the biggest music shows in the country. However, the single would be cancelled. The album, Maximum Trance containing trance remixes of old material would be released as scheduled. Their new television appearances were cancelled as well.

In November, MAX finally made their comeback with the bossa nova influenced single, "Eternal White". The single debuted at #20 and quickly fell off the charts. Subsequent releases continued to come with larger distances in time. The group released two singles in 2003 both failing to reach the top 30. In 2004, the group released a cover of Atomic Kitten's "Be with You". The single debuted at #34 after a promising but ultimately disappointing promotional push. In August, the group performed in the United States for the first time at Texas' AnimeFest held at the Hyatt Hotel in Dallas. Following the event, MAX took time out to participate in solo activities including modeling and acting.

=== 10th Anniversary ===
In 2005, the group celebrated their 10th anniversary. Although the group had not released any new material after the release of "Be With You," they embarked on a hotel tour to commemorate the anniversary. The "MAX Love Trip 2005" spanned four shows in May. During the hotel tour, the group confirmed a new single entitled "Nirai Kanai" for release in July. The single would be a return to their roots incorporating Eurodance beats with traditional Okinawan elements. MAX also had a greater input in this single, not only picking the song but also writing the lyrics and even performing a bit of the instrumental. The group coined the term "Okinawan Euro" to describe the song. In an interview with "Barks.co.jp," the group explained that the long wait for the single was due to their search for the perfect song. They also stated that unlike in the past where they would release singles in a certain time span, that they would now concentrate on only releasing "good" music regardless of how long it takes. Upon release, the single was only able to capture a few thousand sales on the mainland. However, the song proved to be a runaway hit in Okinawa allowing the group to have several live events on the island. They followed up "Nirai Kanai" with another single in November and released their first album with new member, Aki in February 2006, entitled, "Jewel of Jewels." Another single entitled "Splash Gold (Natsu no Kiseki)/Prism of Eyes," the group's first double a-side single was released in August of that year. It became the group's final release with new member, Aki.

=== 2008–2011: Original line-up reformation and 15th anniversary ===
On August 12, 2008, it was announced Aki would be leaving the group to pursue a career as a singer-songwriter. The group made their last public appearance with Aki at the Japanese premiere of the "Sex and the City" film. In October, Lina and Reina told fans that they had been in meetings with their record label. They did not discuss the details of the meeting, however, claimed that all would be revealed soon. On October 28, a press release was issued announcing the return of original member, Mina, and an official comeback. They made their first public appearance on Tokudane and a reunion concert and new remix album were announced. The reunion concert was held on January 31, 2009, as a one-night only event at C.C. Lemon Hall in Shibuya, Tokyo. Its success led to announcement of six additional shows turning the concert event into a nationwide tour. On the first night of the tour, their first comeback single, "Rough Cut Diamond" was announced. It was released on July 22, 2009.

In late 2009, the group announced a one-night monthly concerts series, "MAX Monthly Live: VIP" to celebrate the group's 15th anniversary in 2010. The first concert of the series was held on January 24 at Akazaka Blitz in Tokyo. On May 12, a Eurobeat cover of Anri's "Cat's Eye" was released. It was followed by the release of a Eurobeat cover album composed of 80s and 90s classics and anime songs. "BE MAX" was released on September 8. The album debuted at #19 on the Oricon Weekly Album Chart becoming their first top 20 release since 2002's "eternal white." On September 17, the group appeared on the variety program Nakai Masahiro no Kinyoubi no Smatachi e. The program revealed that they had been in turmoil following Mina's pregnancy. Although the group had shown solidarity following the announcement, it was a farce. The other three members stated that they had felt betrayed by Mina's actions because she did not confide her pregnancy to them herself but through management. The incident created a major rift between the original members and although Aki had been announced as a temporary member while Mina would take maternity leave, Mina had actually already exited the group. The program later revealed that after Aki left the group to pursue a solo career, Nana suggested to the remaining members that they invite Mina to rejoin them. At the conclusion of the program, Mina formally apologized to the group.

On May 21, 2011, the group's management announced that Reina was five months pregnant and would take maternity leave immediately. The announcement also affirmed that MAX would continue activities while Reina remained on hiatus. The group made their final appearance as a four-member group on Hey! Hey! Hey! Music Champ in late July where the remaining members performed for the first time as a three-piece unit.

=== 2012–present: Hare, Tokidoki Farm! and MAX is back ===
As part of NHK's BS Premium's programming block catered to women, the network announced the weekly variety show, Hare, Tokidoki Farm! starring MAX. On the program, the members would hone horticulture and craftsmanship skills with local farmers and guest celebrities. The program premiered in April 2012 and featured MAX's first recording as a three-piece, "Check Me!" as its theme song. On April 17, MAX was announced as spokespersons for Sapporo Beer's wheat and lemon line of beverages. Another original song, "Sun Sun," was used in a commercial campaign aired exclusively in Okinawa.

In October 2012, Reina revealed to fans that she had given birth to her first child, a boy, in November 2011 and that she was six months pregnant with her second child. In February 2013, she announced the birth of her second child, a girl, and confirmed that she would be continuing her maternity leave until further notice. At the end of February, MAX wrapped their tenure on Hare, Tokidoki Farm! and shortly afterwards, Lina informed fans through her blog that MAX had entered into meetings for a planned single release. In late July, a new single was formally announced touting "MAX is back." "Tacata'" released on August 7, is a cover of Tacabro' song of the same name and is their first single as a three-member unit. In 2015, the trio released their cover of the song by The Chainsmokers, "#SELFIE"; now titled "#SELFIE ~ONNA Now~". The song was released to celebrate MAX's 20th anniversary. That year, Reina also had her third child, a boy.

In 2019, another MAX single, "Parthenon", was released to celebrate Reina's return to the group.

== Discography ==
=== Studio albums ===
- 1996: Maximum
- 1997: Maximum II
- 1998: Maximum Groove
- 2001: Emotional History
- 2006: Jewel of Jewels

=== Other albums ===
- 1999: Maximum Collection
- 2000: Super Eurobeat presents Hyper Euro Max
- 2002: Precious Collection 1995–2002
- 2002: Maximum Trance
- 2008: New Edition: Maximum Hits
- 2010: Be MAX

=== Number-one singles ===
- 1997: "Give Me a Shake"

== Tours ==
- August 17, 1997 - September 22, 1997:J-Pop Gig Tour '97 (12 Shows)
- March 24, 1998 - May 31, 1998: MAX Live Contact 1998: MAX Up Your Life (30 Shows)
- March 6, 1999 - August 19, 1999: MAX Live Contact 1999: Sunny Holiday (54 Shows)
- May 1, 2000 - July 2, 2000: MAX Live Contact 2000: No Boundly (17 Shows)
- July 7, 2001 - September 2, 2001: MAX Live Contact 2001: Bitter 4 Sweet (17 Shows)
- January 31, 2009; April 25, 2009 - May 30, 2009: MAX Live Contact 2009: New Edition (7 Shows)

== Filmography ==
- 1995 Yoru mo Hippare (TV Series)
- 1996 Ladie's MAX
- 1997 Ladie's MAX: Give me a Shake
- 1998 Sweet Devil (TV Series)
- 2005 Starlight (TV Series)
- 2006 Churusan 3 (TV Series)
- 2009 Omoikirri Don! (TV Series)
- 2009 Kariyushi Sensei Chibaru (TV Series)
